= List of lakes of Nordwestmecklenburg =

Lakes in the Nordwestmecklenburg district, Mecklenburg-Vorpommern, Germany are:

Lake Name	Elevation	Surface Area
Barner Stücker See	39.9 m (131 ft)	0.102 km^{2} (0.039 mi^{2})
Bibowsee	20.1 m (66 ft)	0.79 km^{2} (0.31 mi^{2})
Cambser See	30.9 m (101 ft)	2.85 km^{2} (1.10 mi^{2})
Cramoner See	43.1 m (141 ft)	0.53 km^{2} (0.20 mi^{2})
Dümmer See	45.5 m (149 ft)	1.59 km^{2} (0.61 mi^{2})
Fischteich	6.8 m (22 ft)	0.266 km^{2} (0.103 mi^{2})
Glammsee	18.4 m (60 ft)	0.66 km^{2} (0.25 mi^{2})
Goldensee	36.1 m (118 ft)	0.94 km^{2} (0.36 mi^{2})
Groß Labenzer See	24.6 m (81 ft)	2.3 km^{2} (0.89 mi^{2})
Großer Dambecker See	52.4 m (172 ft)	0.94 km^{2} (0.36 mi^{2})
Großer Wariner See	21.1 m (69 ft)	2.6 km^{2} (1.0 mi^{2})
Heidensee	37.8 m (124 ft)	0.24 km^{2} (0.093 mi^{2})
Hofsee	49.2 m (161 ft)	0.1 km^{2} (0.039 mi^{2})
Kirch Stücker See	40 m (130 ft)	0.37 km^{2} (0.14 mi^{2})
Kleiner Dambecker See	52.4 m (172 ft)	0.42 km^{2} (0.16 mi^{2})
Lankower See	42.5 m (139 ft)	0.916 km^{2} (0.354 mi^{2})
Mechower See	31.5 m (103 ft)	1.64 km^{2} (0.63 mi^{2})
Neuhofer See	18.1 m (59 ft)	0.79 km^{2} (0.31 mi^{2})
Neuklostersee	25.2 m (83 ft)	2.69 km^{2} (1.04 mi^{2})
Ostorfer See	39.5 m (130 ft)	2.089 km^{2} (0.807 mi^{2})
Ploggensee	32.9 m (108 ft)	0.15 km^{2} (0.058 mi^{2})
Reinstorfer See	46.9 m (154 ft)	0.074 km^{2} (0.029 mi^{2})
Röggeliner See	37.2 m (122 ft)	1.77 km^{2} (0.68 mi^{2})
Santower See	36 m (118 ft)	1.03 km^{2} (0.40 mi^{2})
See Döpe	38 m (125 ft)	0.77 km^{2} (0.30 mi^{2})
Tempziner See	17.6 m (58 ft)	1.6 km^{2} (0.62 mi^{2})
Tramser See	31.9 m (105 ft)	0.26 km^{2} (0.10 mi^{2})
Ziegelsee	37.8 m (124 ft)	3 km^{2} (1.2 mi^{2})

== See also ==
- List of lakes in Mecklenburg-Vorpommern
