= Sternberg Lake District Nature Park =

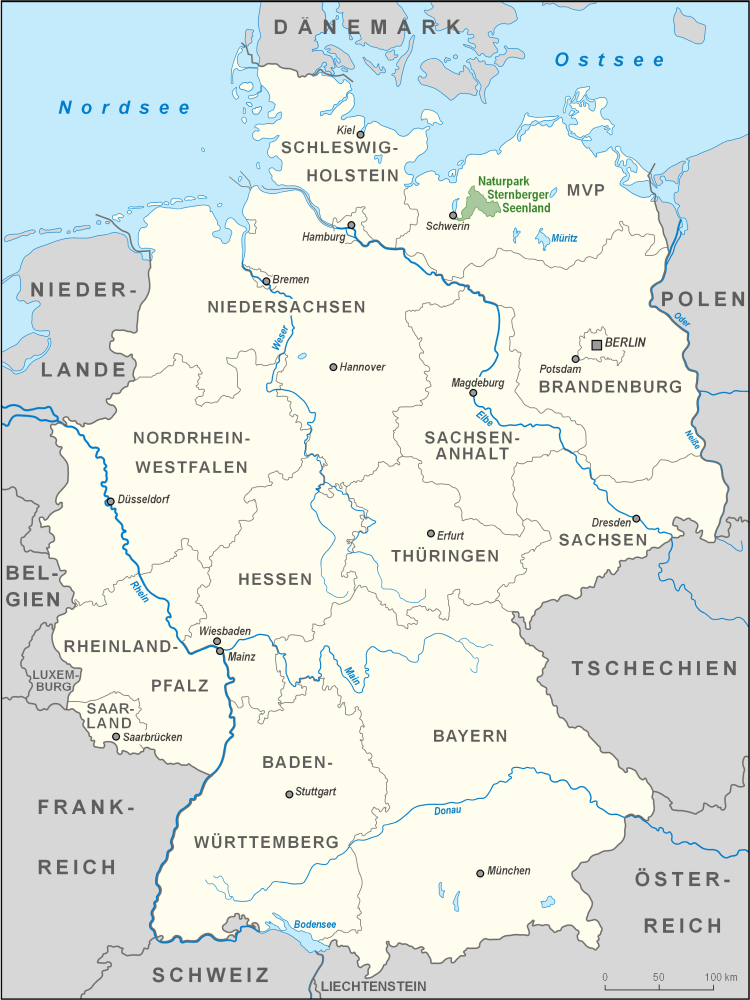
Location

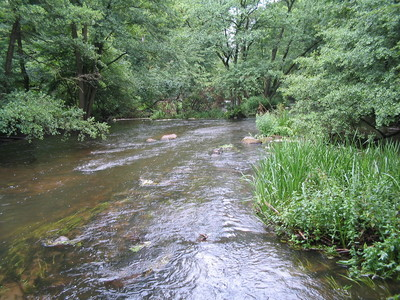
The Warnow in the nature park

The Sternberg Lake District Nature Park (German: Naturpark Sternberger Seenland) lies in the lake regions of Warin-Neukloster, the Sternberg Lake District and the central Warnow valley in the districts of Ludwigslust-Parchim and Nordwestmecklenburg in the German state of Mecklenburg-Vorpommern. It lies east of Lake Schwerin in the region of Sternberg, Brüel, Güstrow, Bützow, Warin and Neukloster.

It was founded on 1 January 2005 as the most recent of the nature parks in Mecklenburg-Vorpommern and is one of the 13 nature parks in Germany that has been awarded the Qualitätsnaturpark seal of quality.

The total area of the nature park is 540 km², of which 41% is farmland, 28% woodland, 17% pasture with some agricultural use, 7% rivers and lakes, and 4% settlements and transport infrastructure.

The nature park contains forested sandar, the glacial meltwater valleys - so-called Urstromtäler - of the rivers Warnow and Mildenitz, meltwater lakes and terminal moraines. The nature park has a large number of lakes, the largest of which are the Großer Wariner See, Groß Labenzer See, Großer Sternberger See and Neuklostersee.

== See also ==
- Giant sequoias near Kölpin
- List of nature parks in Germany
