= Stepenitz (Trave) =

River in Germany

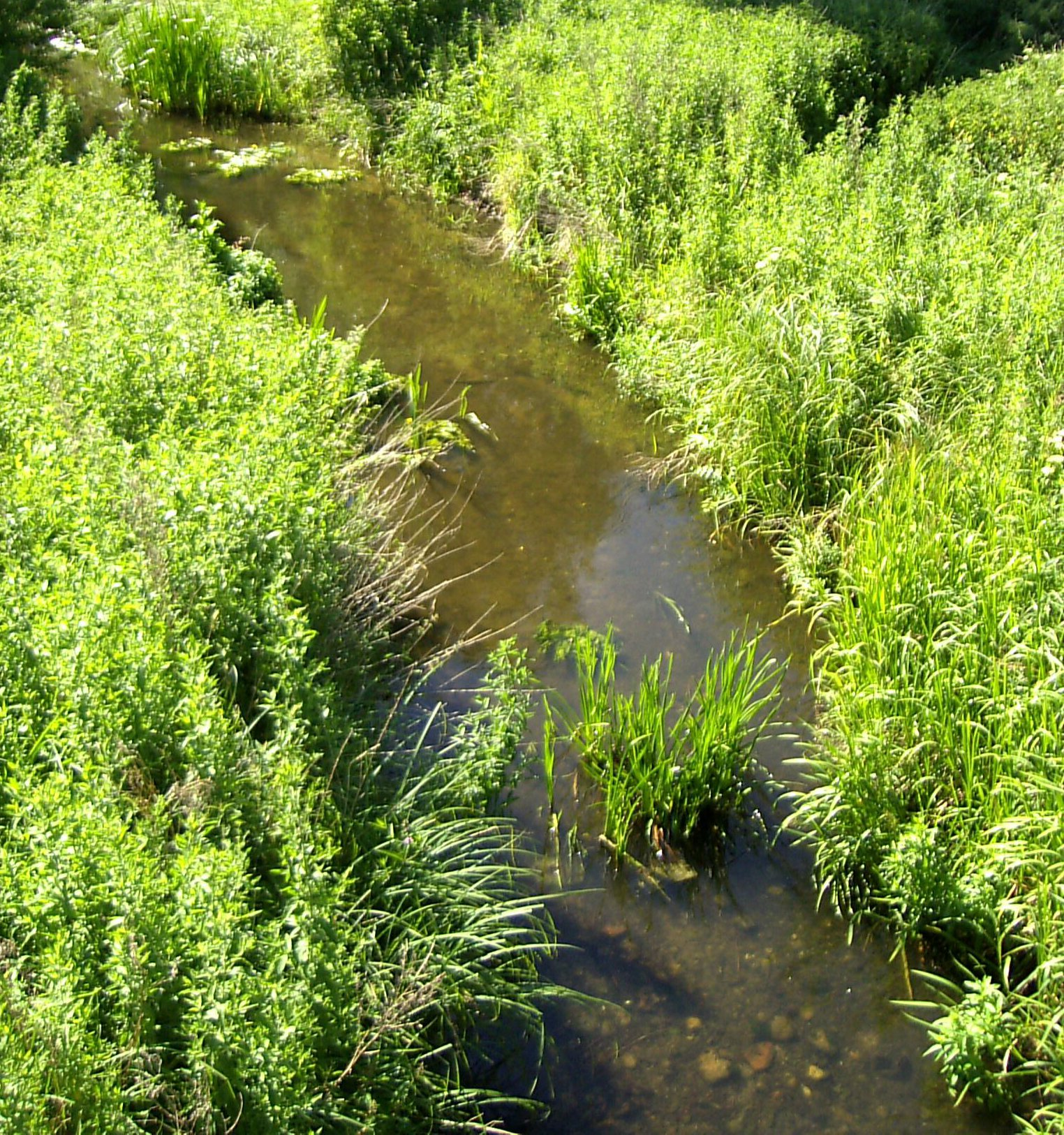
- The Stepenitz between Mühlen Eichsen and Rüting

Location
- Country: Germany
- States: Mecklenburg-Vorpommern, Schleswig-Holstein
- Reference no.: DE: 9628

Physical characteristics
- Source
  - location: Northwest of Schwerin and the Neumühler See
  - coordinates: 53°39′55″N 11°16′49″E
  - elevation: ca. 49 m above sea level (NHN)
- Mouth
  - location: Into the Pötenitzer Wiek
  - coordinates: 53°54′25″N 10°58′00″E
- Length: 52 km (32 mi)
- Basin size: 701 km^{2} (271 sq mi)

Basin features
- Progression: Trave→ Baltic Sea
- Landmarks: Cities: Lübeck; Small towns: Dassow; Villages: Brüsewitz, Cramonshagen, Dalberg-Wendelstorf, Mühlen Eichsen, Rüting, Stepenitztal
- Tributaries
  - left: Radegast, Maurine
  - right: Poischower Mühlenbach
- Waterbodies: Lakes: Rehmsee, Cramoner See, Dalbergkuhle, Wendelstorfer See, Großeichsener See, Dassower See; Reservoirs: Speicher Faulmühle

The Stepenitz (German pronunciation: [ˈʃteːpənɪts]) is a right-bank tributary of the Trave in the northwest of the German state of Mecklenburg-Vorpommern and within the borough of Lübeck in the state of Schleswig-Holstein.

== Course ==
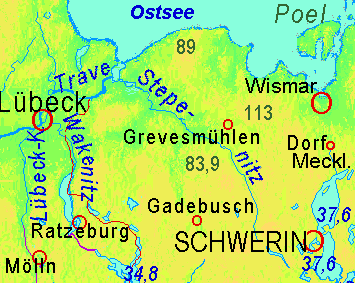
Course of the Stepenitz

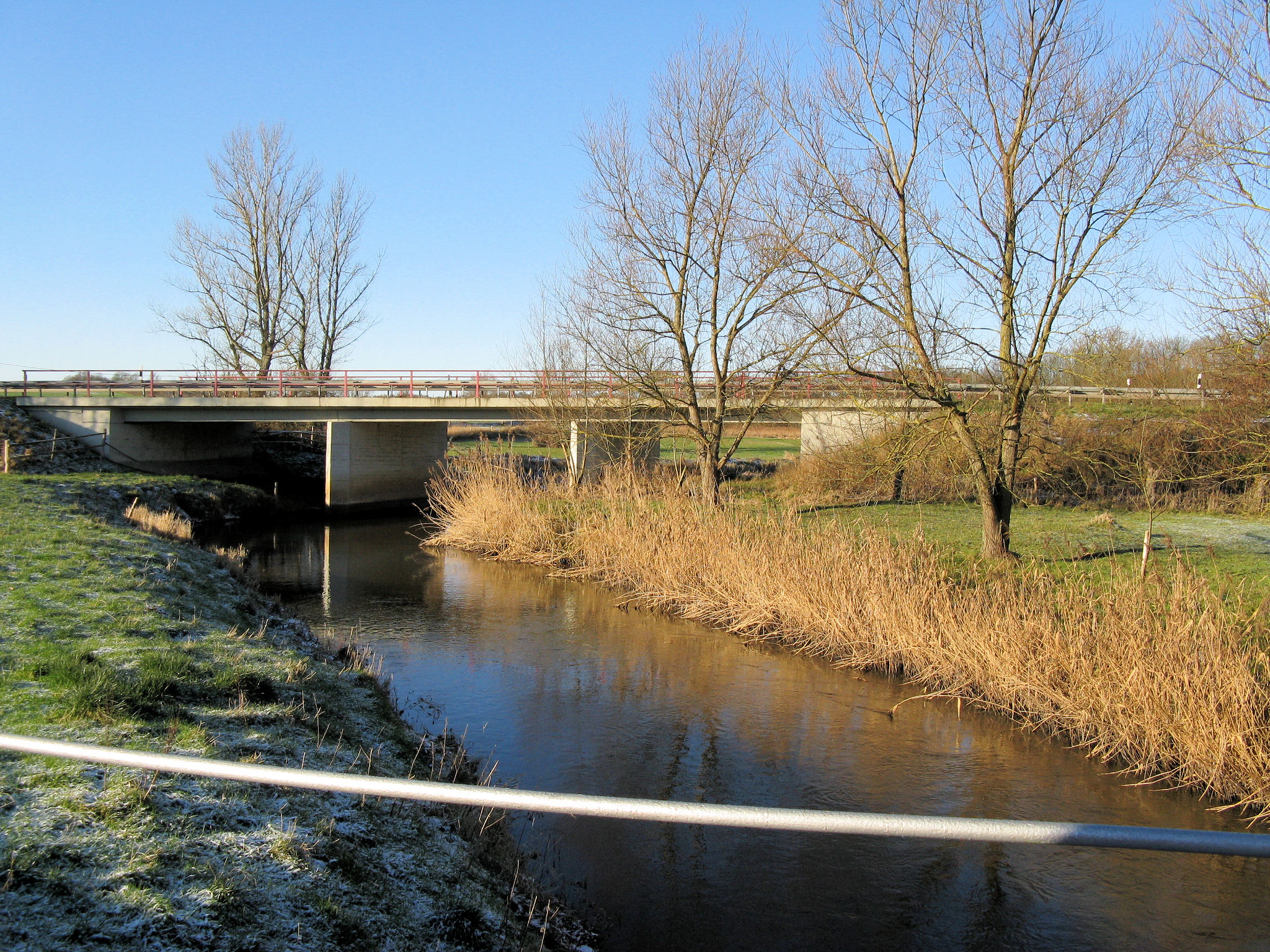
The Stepenitz near Kirch Mummendorf

The river rises northwest of city of Schwerin and the lake of Neumühler See near the Brüsewitz settlement of Eulenkrug and north of a hill ridge at a height of about 49 m above sea level (NHN). From there it first flows through the lake Rehmsee and then a succession of other lakes, including the Reservoir Faulmühle, the Cramoner See, the Wendelstorfer See and the Großeichsener See. Continuing to head northwest, it collects the River Radegast in Börzow and the Maurine four kilometres (2.5 mi) before Dassow. The river section from Rüting to Dassow has numerous meanders.

Just behind the Dassow Bridge in Lübeck the Stepenitz empties into the Dassower See. Through this lake its waters reach the Pötenitzer Wiek, a bay of the Trave river, the Priwall Peninsula and Mecklenburg, where the Stepenitz discharges into the Trave at sea level. A few hundred metres further north, by Travemünde, the Trave reaches the Baltic. The length of the river from source to its mouth on the Dassower See is 52 kilometres (32 mi). Its catchment covers an area of 701 km^{2} (271 sq mi).

=== Watersheds ===
The source region of the Stepenitz lies on the North Sea-Baltic Sea Watershed. While the Stepenitz flows in a northwesterly direction via the Trave to the Baltic, the waters of the Sude, which rises just a few kilometres further southwest and heads in a southwesterly direction, run via the River Elbe to the North Sea.

== Gallery ==
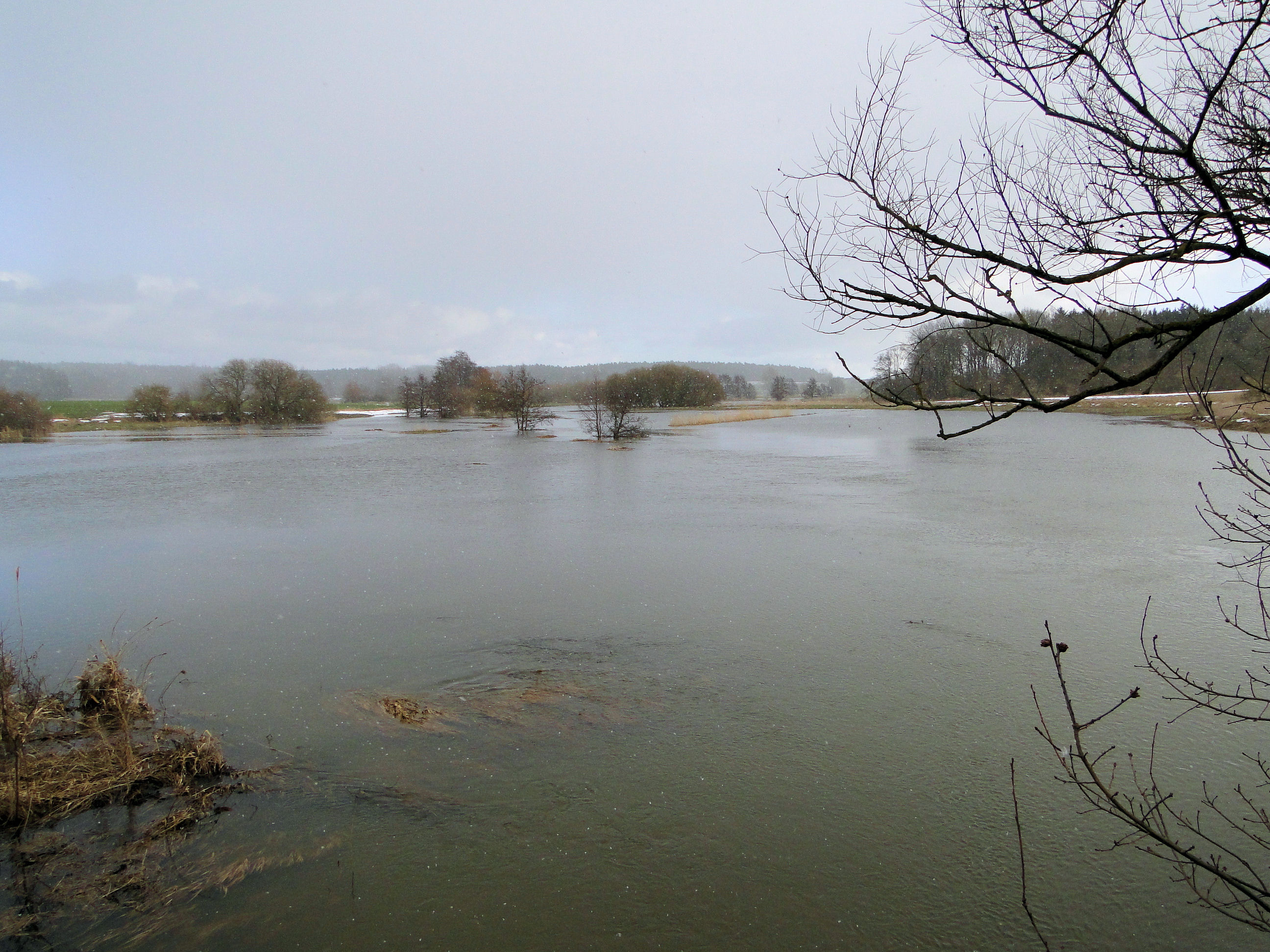
High water at the confluence of the Stepenitz and Radegast in March 2010

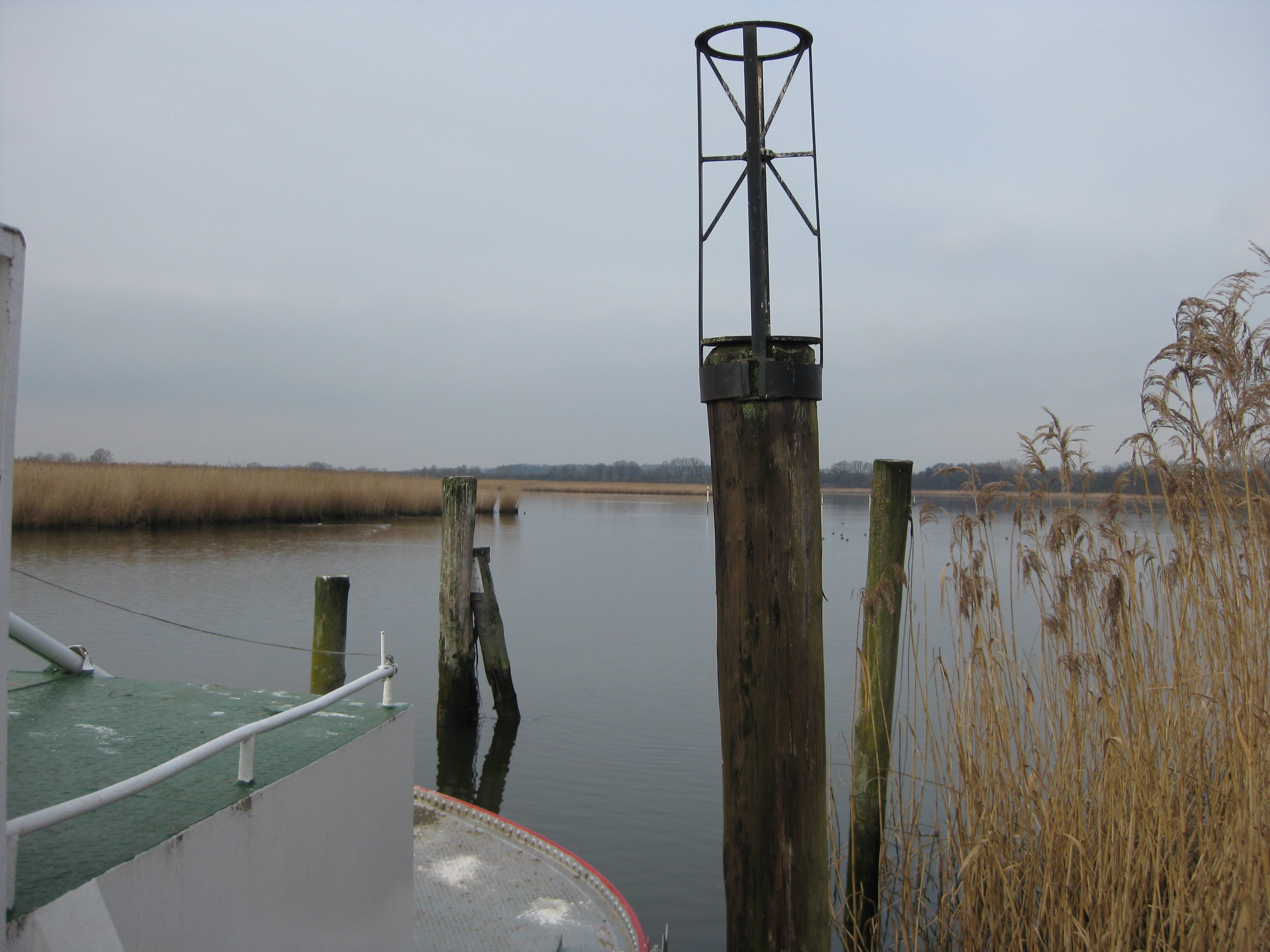
Mouth of the Stepenitz on the Dassower See

== See also ==
- List of rivers of Mecklenburg-Vorpommern
- List of rivers of Schleswig-Holstein
