= Tiene =

Tiene may refer to:

- Tiene (container), a container for transporting wine and fruit, used until shortly after the First World War in northern Germany.
- Tiene (Radegast), a river of Mecklenburg-Vorpommern, Germany, tributary of the Radegast
- Tiene language, a Bantu language of the Democratic Republic of Congo

People

- Carla Tiene (born 1981), Brazilian tennis player
- Izalene Tiene (born 1943), Brazilian social worker and politician
- Schwenck (Cléber Schwenck Tiene; born 1979), Brazilian footballer
- Siaka Tiéné (born 1982), Ivorian footballer
