= Tiene (Radegast) =

River in Germany

Location
- Country: Germany
- State: Mecklenburg-Vorpommern

Physical characteristics
- Mouth
  - location: Radegast
  - coordinates: 53.7919°N 11.0517°E

Basin features
- Progression: Radegast→ Stepenitz→ Trave→ Baltic Sea

Tiene is a river of Mecklenburg-Vorpommern, Germany. It is a right tributary of the Radegast.

== See also ==
- List of rivers of Mecklenburg-Vorpommern
