= Schildberg =

Schildberg is the former German name of several cities now outside Germany:

- Ostrzeszów, Poland
- Štíty, Czech Republic

Schildberg is also the name of several Ortsteile (roughly, districts) of larger municipalities:

- Schildberg, Gemeinde Böheimkirchen, Austria
- Schildberg, Gemeinde Sankt Paul im Lavanttal, Austria
- Schildberg, Gemeinde Rüting, Germany
