= Seehof =

Seehof may refer to:

- Seehof, Germany
- Seehof, Switzerland
