= Alt Meteln =

- Municipality
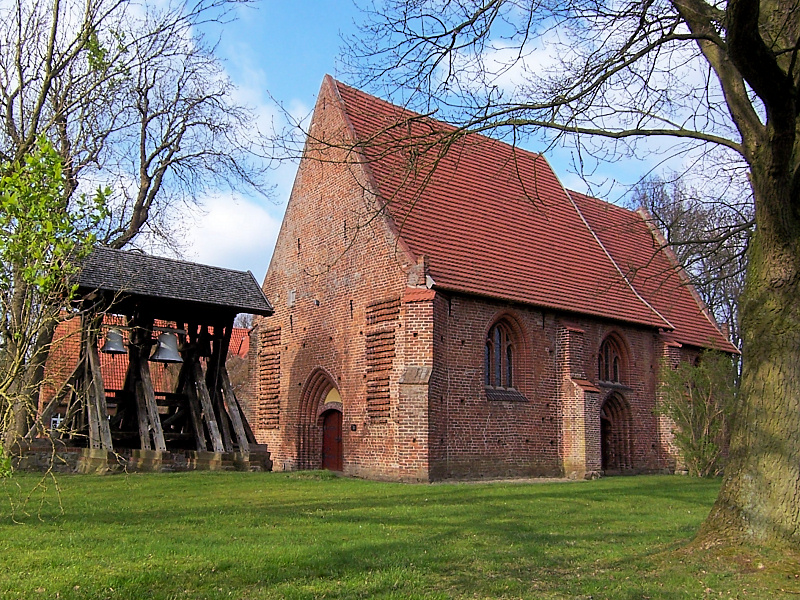
- Church

- Location of Alt Meteln within Nordwestmecklenburg district
- Interactive map of Alt Meteln
- Location within Germany Location within Mecklenburg-Vorpommern
- Coordinates: 53°45′N 11°20′E
- Country: Germany
- State: Mecklenburg-Vorpommern
- District: Nordwestmecklenburg
- Municipal assoc.: Lützow-Lübstorf

Government
  - Mayor: Dieter Franz

Area
  - Total: 23.07 km^{2} (8.91 sq mi)
- Elevation: 49 m (161 ft)

Population (2025-12-31)
  - Total: 1,170
  - Density: 50.7/km^{2} (131/sq mi)
- Time zone: UTC+01:00 (CET)
  - Summer (DST): UTC+02:00 (CEST)
- Postal codes: 19069
- Dialling codes: 03867
- Vehicle registration: NWM
- Website: www.amt-luetzow.de

Alt Meteln is a municipality in the Nordwestmecklenburg district, in Mecklenburg-Vorpommern, Germany.

== Geography ==
The municipality lies 15 kilometers north of Schwerin. The local landscape is glacial carved and the Schweriner See and the Stepenitz are located east and west of Alt Meteln respectively. The Auchbach flows by the municipality towards Schwerin.

== History ==
The first mention of the municipality dates back to 1284 when it was mentioned as a small village. A Gothic brick church located in the municipality dates back to the 13th century.
