= Lützow, Germany =

Lützow
- Municipality
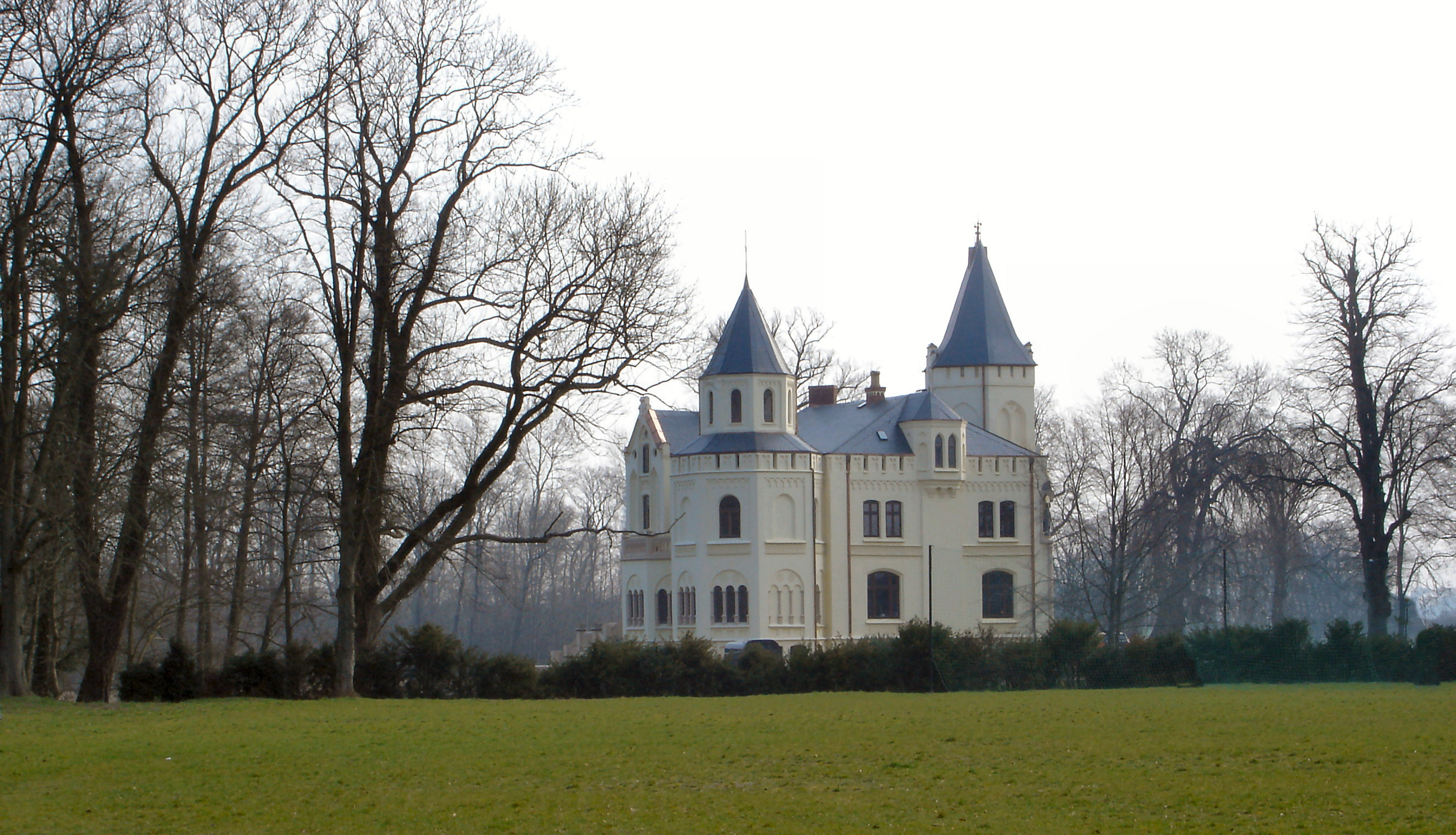
- Schloss Lützow in Lützow

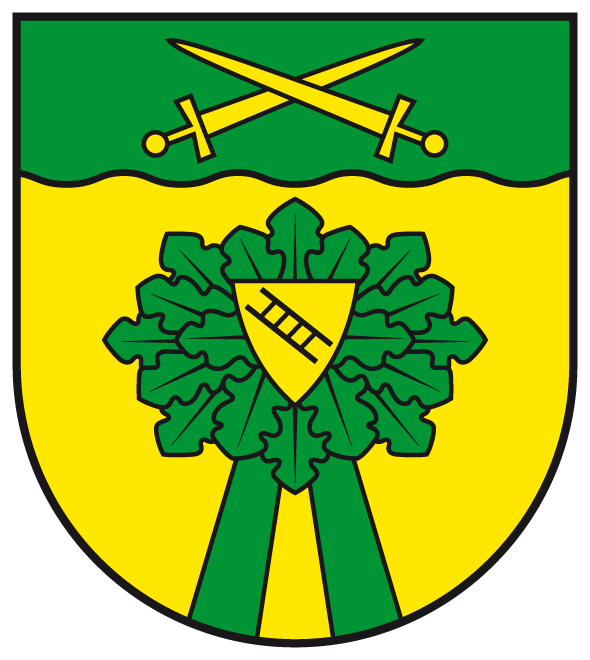
- Coat of arms

- Location of Lützow within Nordwestmecklenburg district
- Interactive map of Lützow
- Location within Germany Location within Mecklenburg-Vorpommern
- Coordinates: 53°38′N 11°10′E
- Country: Germany
- State: Mecklenburg-Vorpommern
- District: Nordwestmecklenburg
- Municipal assoc.: Lützow-Lübstorf

Government
  - Mayor: Gerd Pusch

Area
  - Total: 24.83 km^{2} (9.59 sq mi)
- Elevation: 62 m (203 ft)

Population (2025-12-31)
  - Total: 1,542
  - Density: 62.10/km^{2} (160.8/sq mi)
- Time zone: UTC+01:00 (CET)
  - Summer (DST): UTC+02:00 (CEST)
- Postal codes: 19209
- Dialling codes: 038874
- Vehicle registration: NWM

Lützow is a municipality in the Nordwestmecklenburg district, in Mecklenburg-Vorpommern, Germany.

It is close to the cities of Lübeck, Wismar and Schwerin and is part of the Hamburg Metropolitan Region.
