= Glammsee =

Lake in Warin, Mecklenburg-Vorpommern, Germany

- Location within Mecklenburg-Vorpommern
- Location: Nordwestmecklenburg, Mecklenburg-Vorpommern
- Coordinates: 53.795°N 11.705°E
- Primary inflows: Mühlengraben (Brüeler Bach)
- Primary outflows: Tönnisbach (Brüeler Bach)
- Basin countries: Germany
- Surface area: 0.66 km^{2} (0.25 sq mi)
- Surface elevation: 18.4 m (60 ft)
- Settlements: Warin

Glammsee is a lake in the Nordwestmecklenburg district in Mecklenburg-Vorpommern, Germany. At an elevation of 18.4 m, its surface area is 0.66 km².
