= Cramoner See =

Lake in Mecklenburg-Vorpommern, Germany

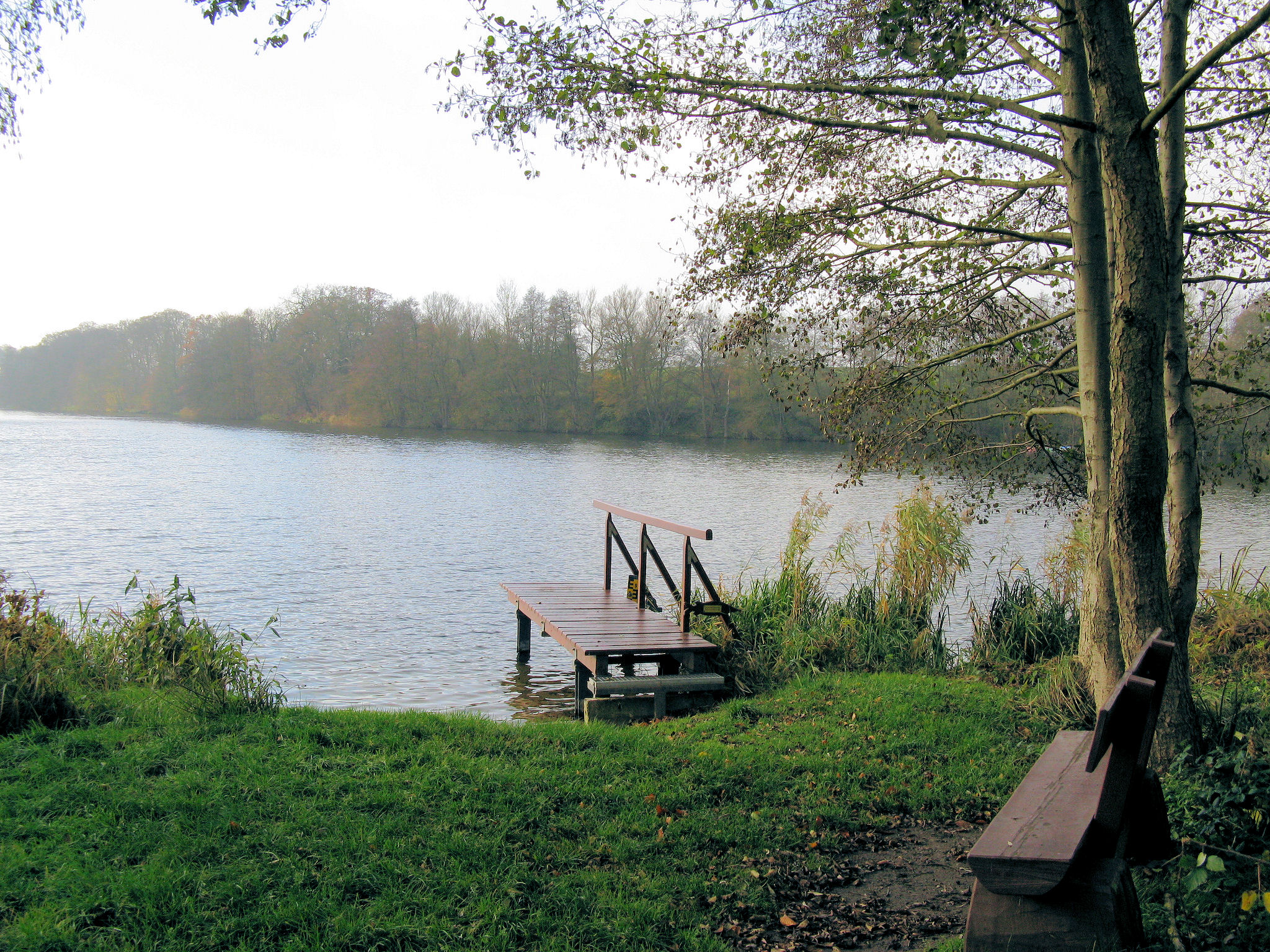

- Location within Mecklenburg-Vorpommern
- Location: Nordwestmecklenburg, Mecklenburg-Vorpommern
- Coordinates: 53.70494°N 11.27248°E
- Primary inflows: Stepenitz
- Primary outflows: Stepenitz
- Basin countries: Germany
- Max. length: 2.4 km (1.5 mi)
- Max. width: 0.35 km (0.22 mi)
- Surface area: 0.53 km^{2} (0.20 sq mi)
- Average depth: 4 m (13 ft)
- Max. depth: 8 m (26 ft)
- Surface elevation: 43.1 m (141 ft)

Cramoner See is a lake in the Nordwestmecklenburg district in Mecklenburg-Vorpommern, Germany. At an elevation of 43.1 m, its surface area is 0.58 km^{2}. Through this lake the Stepenitz flows in the municipality of Cramonshagen in the Nordwestmecklenburg district.
