= Neumühler See =

Lake in Mecklenburg-Vorpommern, Germany

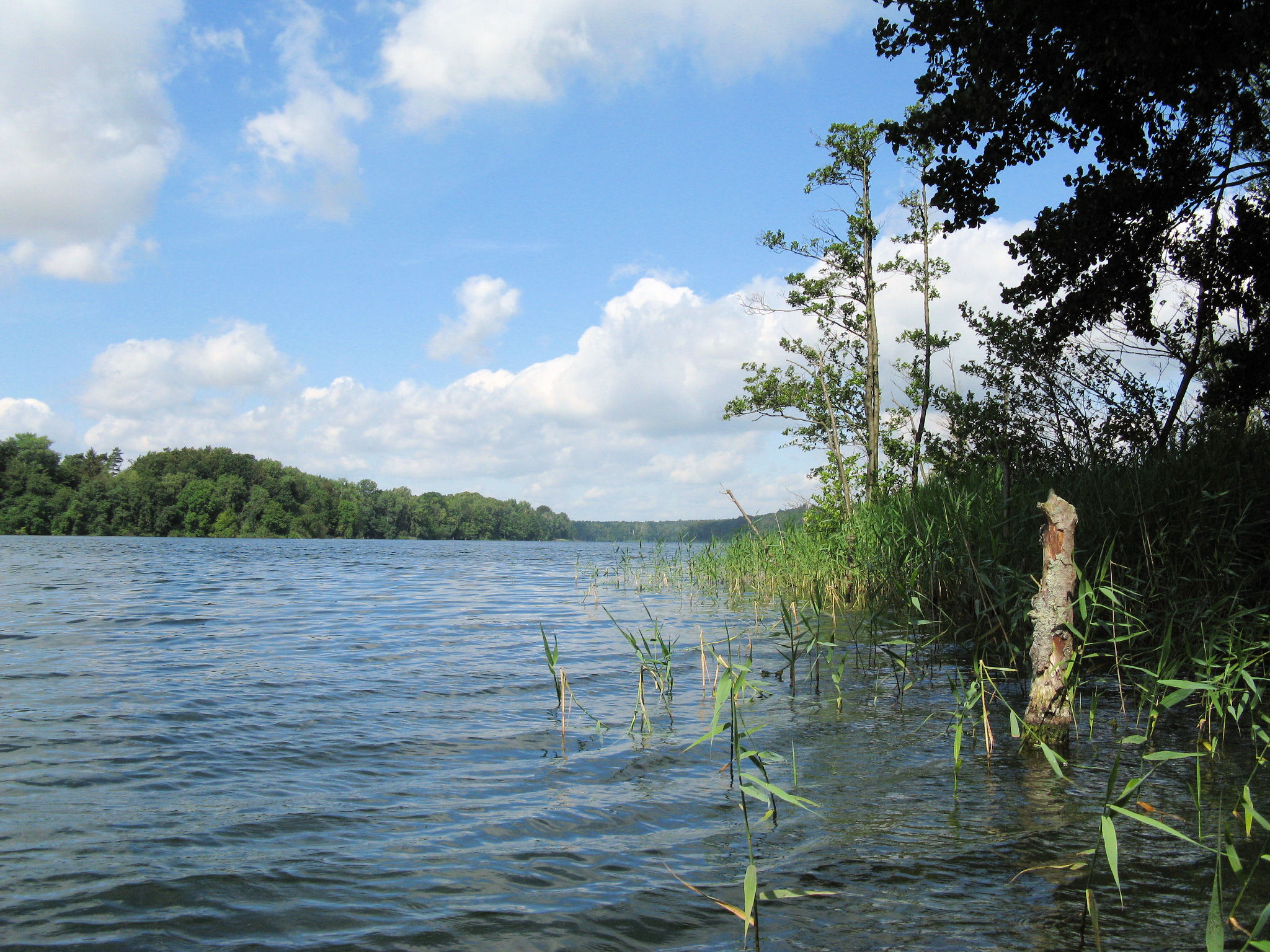

- Location within Mecklenburg-Vorpommern
- Location: Mecklenburg-Vorpommern
- Coordinates: 53°38′37″N 11°20′14″E
- Primary outflows: Nuddelbach
- Basin countries: Germany
- Surface area: 1.715 km^{2} (0.662 sq mi)
- Average depth: 7.9 m (26 ft)
- Max. depth: 17.1 m (56 ft)
- Water volume: 13,550,000 m^{3} (479,000,000 cu ft)
- Surface elevation: 44 m (144 ft)
- Settlements: Schwerin

Neumühler See is a lake in Mecklenburg-Vorpommern, Germany. At an elevation of 44 m, its surface area is 1.715 km².

The lake's only outflow is the Nuttelbach, which flows into the small lake Ostorfer See.
