= Giant sequoias near Kölpin =

Coordinates: 53.63508°N 11.65453°E

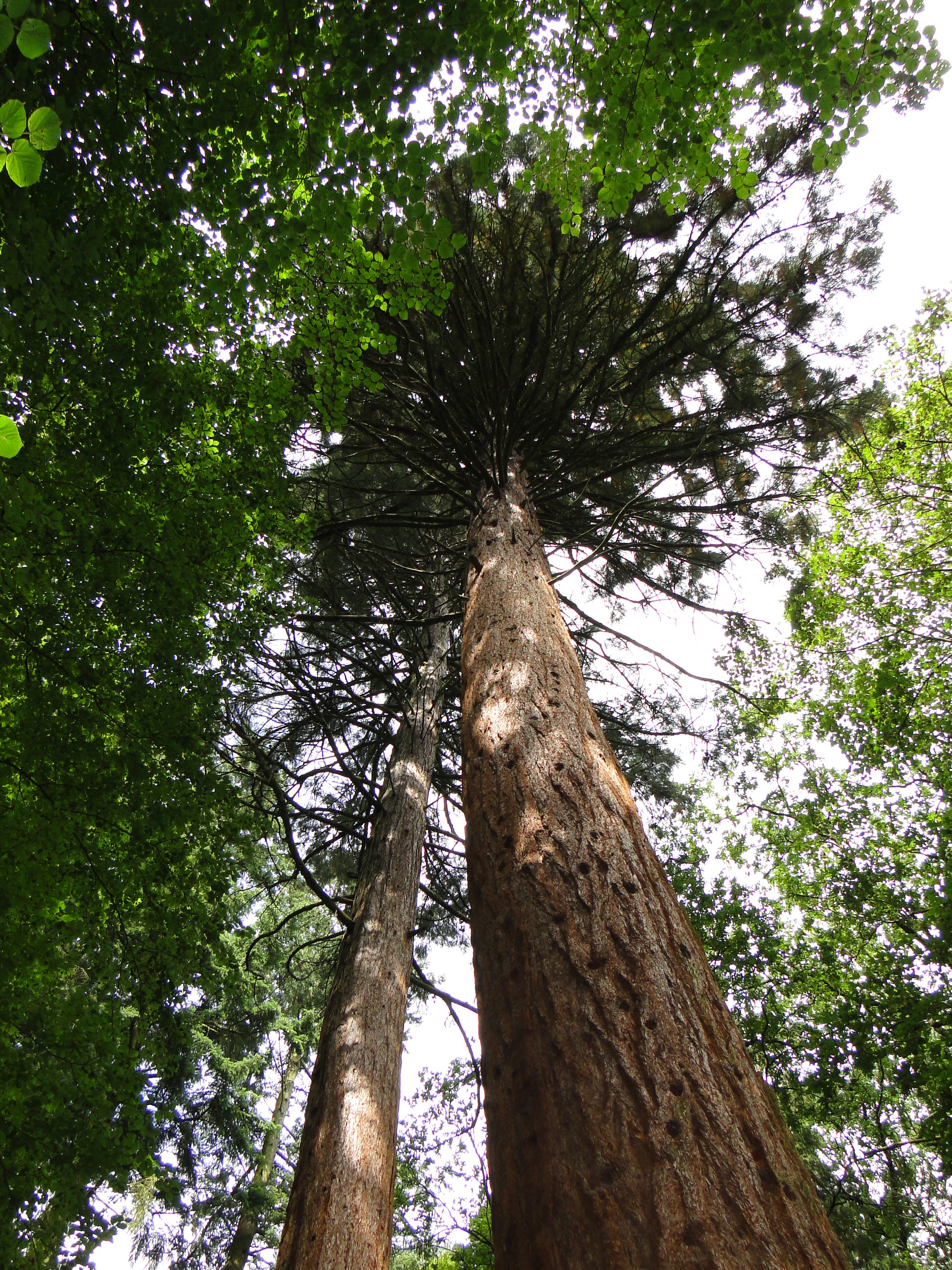
Giant trees near Kölpin

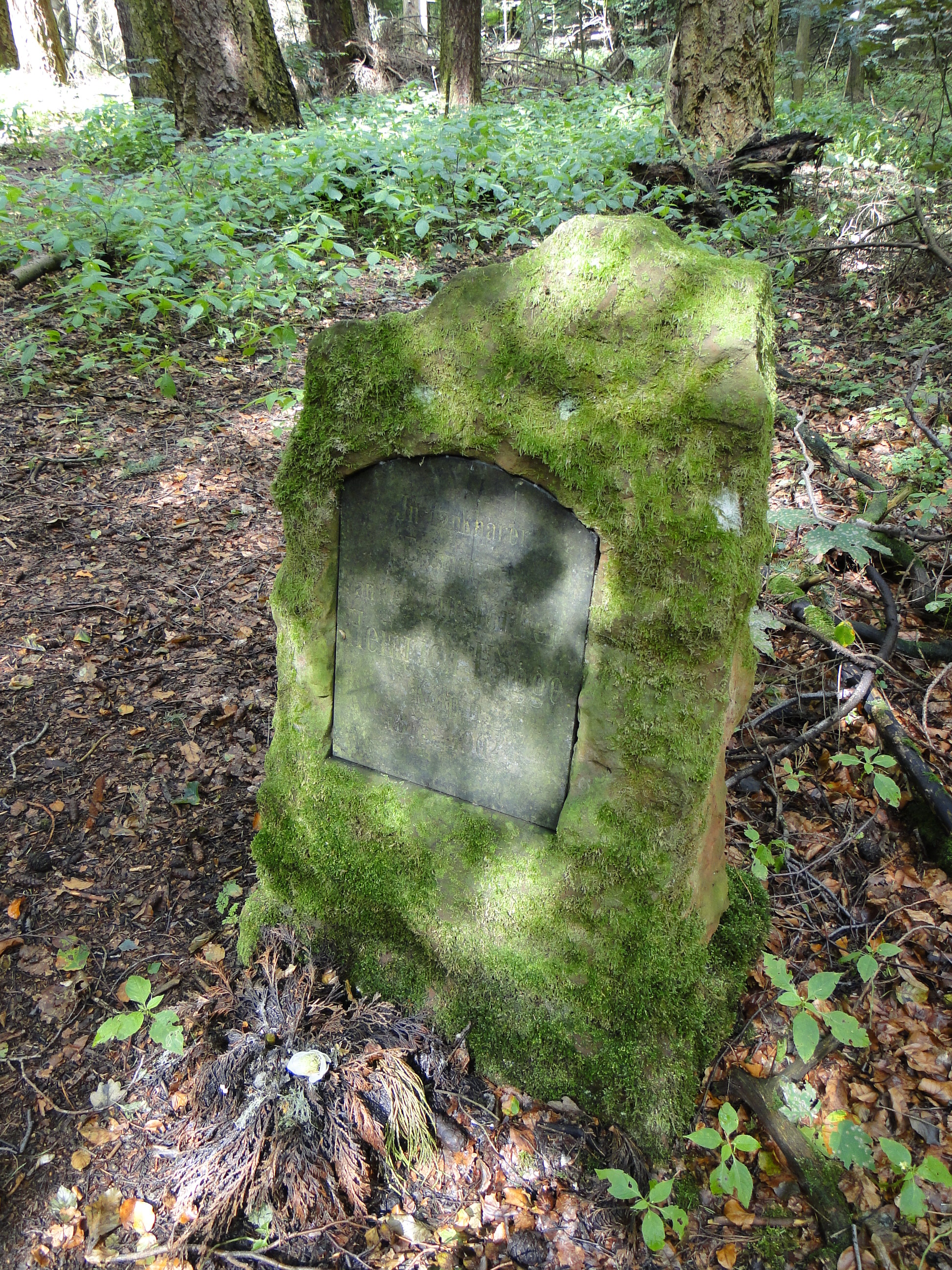
Memorial to estate forester, Heinrich Hagge

The two giant sequoias near Kölpin in the parish of Demen in the district of Ludwigslust-Parchim in the German state of Mecklenburg-Vorpommern, are a natural monument. They belong to the species commonly known as giant sequoia, but also Wellingtonia and Sierra redwood (Sequoiadendron giganteum).

The two trees lie in a forested area in the Sternberg Lake District Nature Park between the villages of Kölpin in the municipality of Demen and Basthorst in the municipality of Crivitz. They may be reached on foot on a path, 350 metres west of the L 9 state road. Wooden signposts point the way to the natural monument. Near the giant trees are two small ponds. The larger one is called the Schapwäsch (Low German for "sheep wash").

The thicker of the over 40 metre high giant sequoias has a trunk diameter of over 2 metres at a height of one metre above the ground. Under estate owner, Julius Hüniken, and his estate forester, Heinrich Hagge, the estates were afforested in the 1870s. Hüniken was a member of the Mecklenburg Society of Foresters (Verein Mecklenburgischer Forstwirte). As a result of his interest in dendrology, rare trees were also planted, such as these giant sequoias, otherwise native in North America on the western slopes of the Sierra Nevada in California.

At the foot of the trees stands a memorial to Heinrich Hagge, who worked in this forest estate from 1875 to 1904.

Inscription: "In dankbarer Erinnerung an den Gutsförſter Heinrich Hagge Kölpin 1875–1904" ("In grateful memory of estate forester Heinrich Hagge Kölpin 1875–1904")
