= Tempziner See =

Lake in Germany

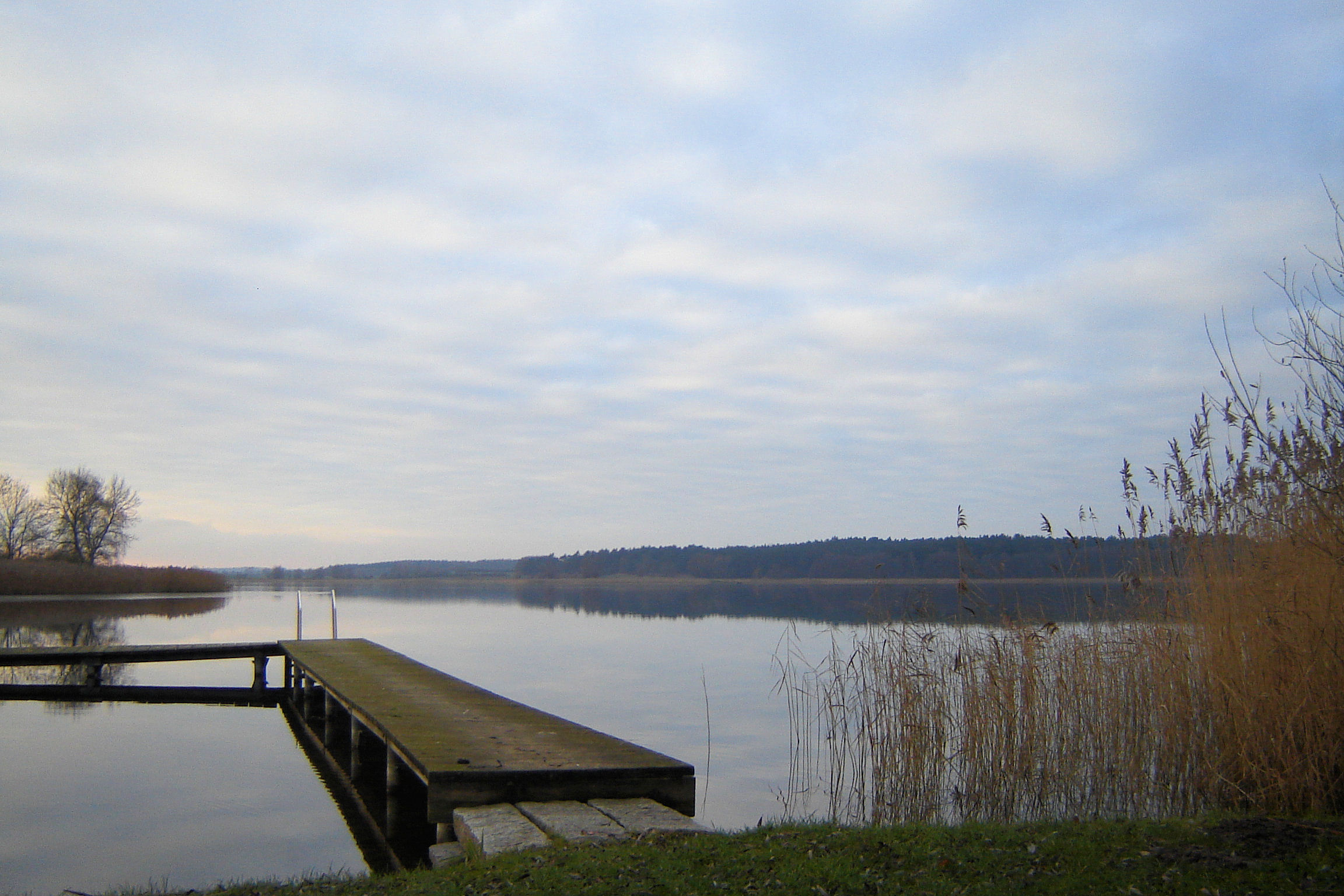

- Location within Mecklenburg-Vorpommern
- Location: Nordwestmecklenburg, Mecklenburg-Vorpommern
- Coordinates: 53°45′58″N 11°42′6″E
- Primary inflows: Tönniesbach
- Primary outflows: Brüeler Bach
- Basin countries: Germany
- Surface area: 1.6 km^{2} (0.62 sq mi)
- Average depth: 4.5 m (15 ft)
- Max. depth: 15.1 m (50 ft)
- Surface elevation: 17.6 m (58 ft)

Tempziner See is a lake in the Nordwestmecklenburg district in Mecklenburg-Vorpommern, Germany. At an elevation of 17.6 m, its surface area is 1.6 km².
