= Lützow-Lübstorf =

Amt in Mecklenburg-Vorpommern, Germany

- Amt
- Map of Nordwestmecklenburg highlighting Lützow-Lübstorf
- Interactive map of Lützow-Lübstorf
- Location within Germany Location within Mecklenburg-Vorpommern
- Coordinates: 53°40′N 11°15′E
- Country: Germany
- State: Mecklenburg-Vorpommern
- District: Nordwestmecklenburg
- Seat: Lützow
- Subdivisions: 15 municipalities

Area
  - Total: 276.54 km^{2} (106.77 sq mi)

Population (2025-12-31)
  - Total: 13,513
  - Density: 48.865/km^{2} (126.56/sq mi)
- Time zone: UTC+01:00 (CET)
  - Summer (DST): UTC+02:00 (CEST)
- Website: www.luetzow-luebstorf.de

Lützow-Lübstorf is an Amt in the district of Nordwestmecklenburg, in Mecklenburg-Vorpommern, Germany. The seat of the Amt is in Lützow.

The Amt Lützow-Lübstorf consists of the following municipalities:

1. Alt Meteln
2. Brüsewitz
3. Cramonshagen
4. Dalberg-Wendelstorf
5. Gottesgabe
6. Grambow
7. Klein Trebbow
8. Lübstorf
9. Lützow
10. Perlin
11. Pingelshagen
12. Pokrent
13. Schildetal
14. Seehof
15. Zickhusen
