= Pingelshagen =

- Municipality
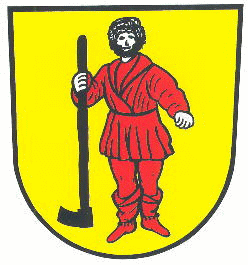
- Coat of arms

- Location of Pingelshagen within Nordwestmecklenburg district
- Interactive map of Pingelshagen
- Location within Germany Location within Mecklenburg-Vorpommern
- Coordinates: 53°40′N 11°20′E
- Country: Germany
- State: Mecklenburg-Vorpommern
- District: Nordwestmecklenburg
- Municipal assoc.: Lützow-Lübstorf

Government
  - Mayor: Maike Frey

Area
  - Total: 2.07 km^{2} (0.80 sq mi)
- Elevation: 54 m (177 ft)

Population (2025-12-31)
  - Total: 549
  - Density: 265/km^{2} (687/sq mi)
- Time zone: UTC+01:00 (CET)
  - Summer (DST): UTC+02:00 (CEST)
- Postal codes: 19069
- Dialling codes: 0385
- Vehicle registration: NWM
- Website: www.pingelshagen.de

Pingelshagen is a municipality in the Nordwestmecklenburg district, in Mecklenburg-Vorpommern, Germany.
