= Demen =

- Municipality
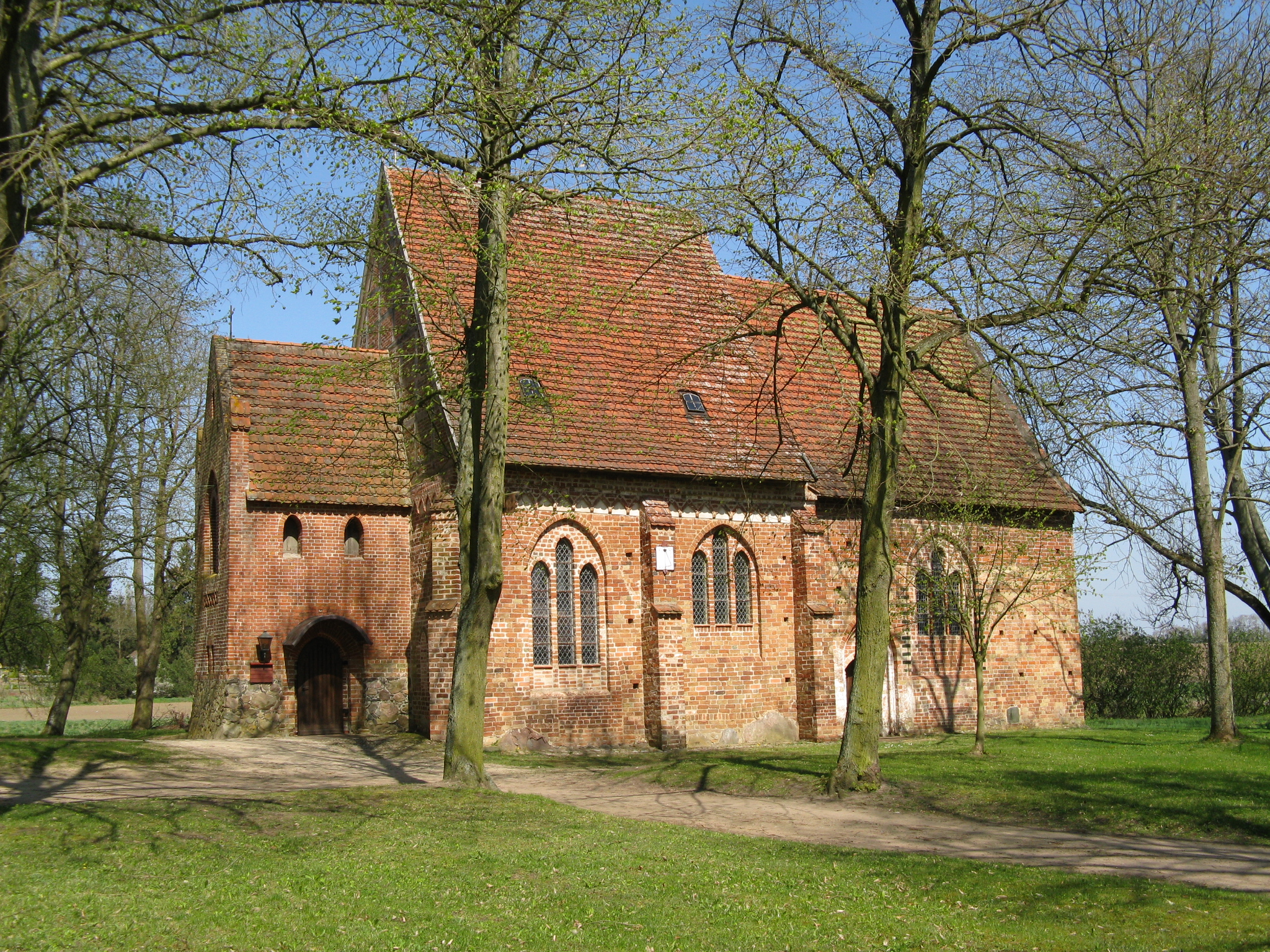
- Medieval village church in Demen

- Coat of arms

- Location of Demen within Ludwigslust-Parchim district
- Interactive map of Demen
- Location within Germany Location within Mecklenburg-Vorpommern
- Coordinates: 53°38′N 11°46′E
- Country: Germany
- State: Mecklenburg-Vorpommern
- District: Ludwigslust-Parchim
- Municipal assoc.: Crivitz
- Subdivisions: 4

Government
  - Mayor: Thomas Schwarz

Area
  - Total: 46.81 km^{2} (18.07 sq mi)
- Elevation: 45 m (148 ft)

Population (2025-12-31)
  - Total: 1,127
  - Density: 24.08/km^{2} (62.36/sq mi)
- Time zone: UTC+01:00 (CET)
  - Summer (DST): UTC+02:00 (CEST)
- Postal codes: 19089
- Dialling codes: 038488
- Vehicle registration: PCH
- Website: www.gemeinde-demen.de

Demen (German pronunciation: [ˈdeːmən]) is a municipality in the Ludwigslust-Parchim district, in Mecklenburg-Vorpommern, Germany.

== Localities ==
- Giant sequoias near Kölpin
