= Maurine (stream) =

River in Germany

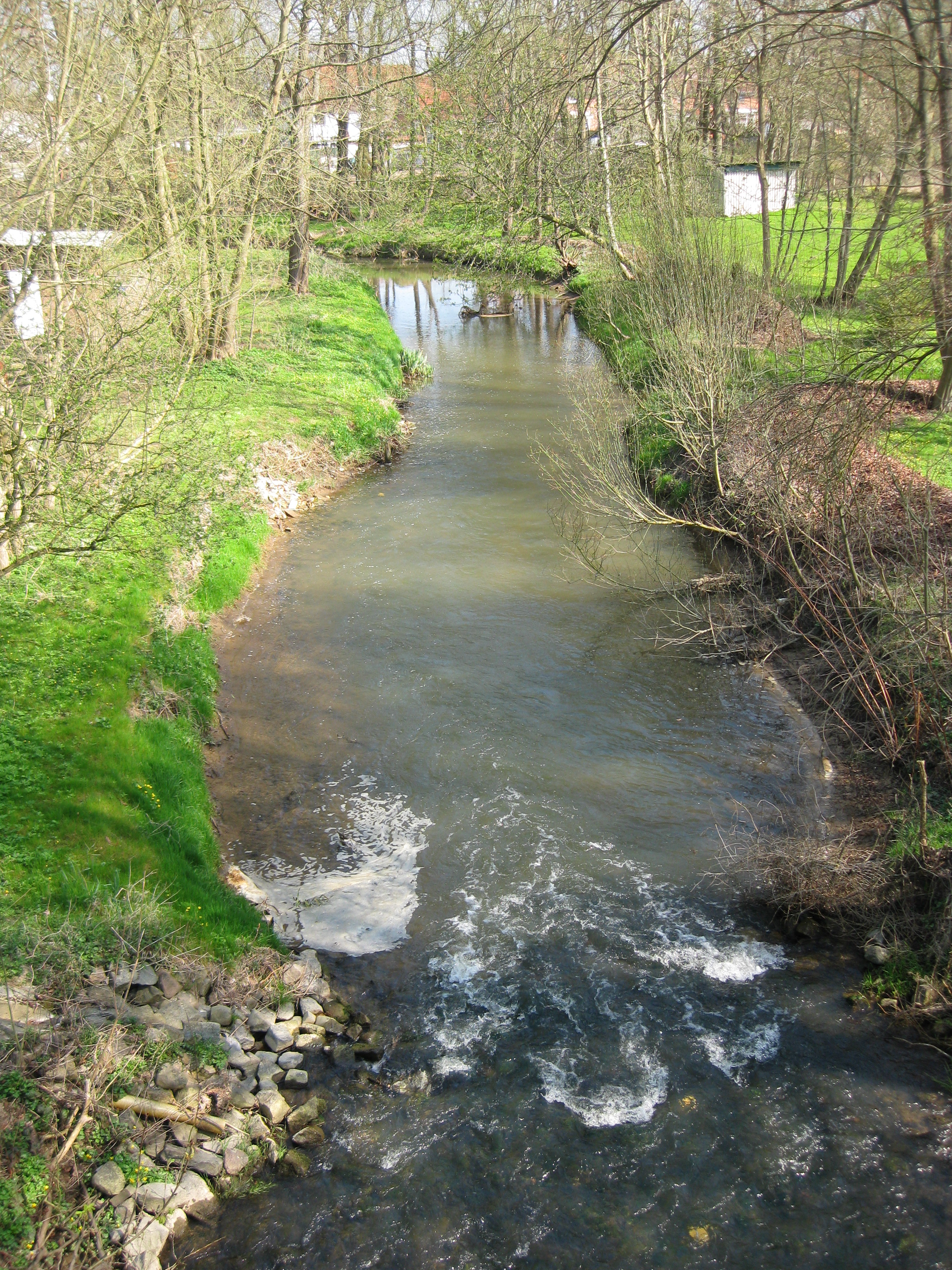

Location
- Country: Germany
- State: Mecklenburg-Vorpommern

Physical characteristics
- Mouth
  - location: Stepenitz
  - coordinates: 53.8777°N 10.9739°E

Basin features
- Progression: Stepenitz→ Trave→ Baltic Sea

The Maurine is a 20-kilometre-long (12 mi) tributary of the Stepenitz in the extreme northwest corner of Mecklenburg-Vorpommern, Germany. The Maurine drains an area of 167 km².

== Course of the river ==
The Maurine originates between Carlow and Groß Rünz in the southwest of the district Nordwestmecklenburg in a forest and meadow area 45 m above mean sea level.

The difference in height from the source to the delta is approximately 45 m.
