= Perlin, Germany =

Perlin
- Municipality
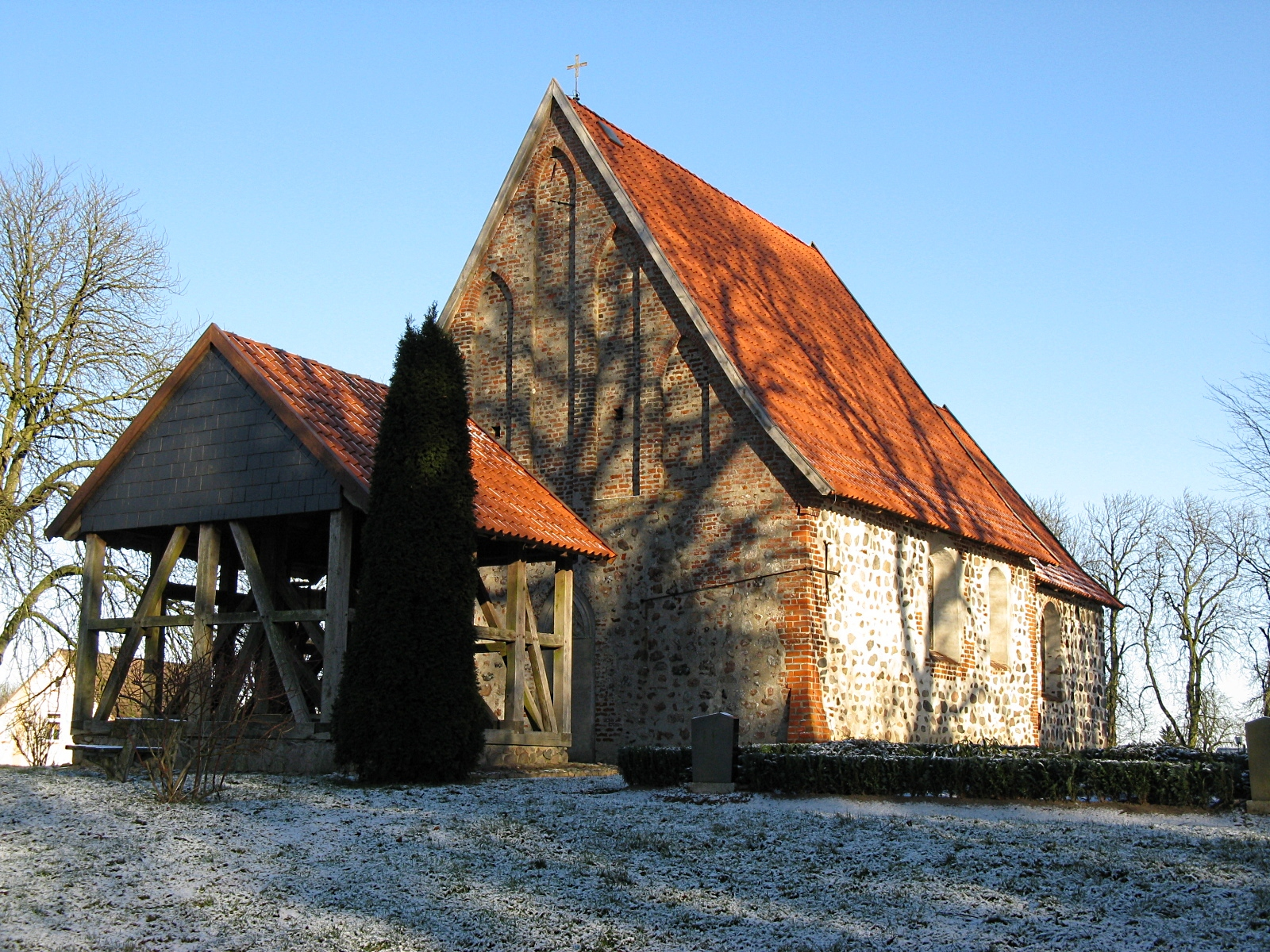
- Perlin Church

- Location of Perlin within Nordwestmecklenburg district
- Interactive map of Perlin
- Location within Germany Location within Mecklenburg-Vorpommern
- Coordinates: 53°34′N 11°10′E
- Country: Germany
- State: Mecklenburg-Vorpommern
- District: Nordwestmecklenburg
- Municipal assoc.: Lützow-Lübstorf

Government
  - Mayor: Heinz-Dietrich Frank

Area
  - Total: 13.44 km^{2} (5.19 sq mi)
- Elevation: 45 m (148 ft)

Population (2025-12-31)
  - Total: 375
  - Density: 27.9/km^{2} (72.3/sq mi)
- Time zone: UTC+01:00 (CET)
  - Summer (DST): UTC+02:00 (CEST)
- Postal codes: 19209
- Dialling codes: 03869
- Vehicle registration: NWM
- Website: www.amt-luetzow.de

Perlin is a municipality in the Nordwestmecklenburg district, in Mecklenburg-Vorpommern, Germany.
