= Gottesgabe =

- Municipality
- Location of Gottesgabe within Nordwestmecklenburg district
- Interactive map of Gottesgabe
- Location within Germany Location within Mecklenburg-Vorpommern
- Coordinates: 53°37′N 11°15′E
- Country: Germany
- State: Mecklenburg-Vorpommern
- District: Nordwestmecklenburg
- Municipal assoc.: Lützow-Lübstorf

Government
  - Mayor: Christina Schmeichel

Area
  - Total: 22.25 km^{2} (8.59 sq mi)
- Elevation: 58 m (190 ft)

Population (2025-12-31)
  - Total: 768
  - Density: 34.5/km^{2} (89.4/sq mi)
- Time zone: UTC+01:00 (CET)
  - Summer (DST): UTC+02:00 (CEST)
- Postal codes: 19209
- Dialling codes: 038874
- Vehicle registration: NWM

Gottesgabe is a municipality in the Nordwestmecklenburg district, in Mecklenburg-Vorpommern, Germany.
