= Radegast (Stepenitz) =

River in Germany

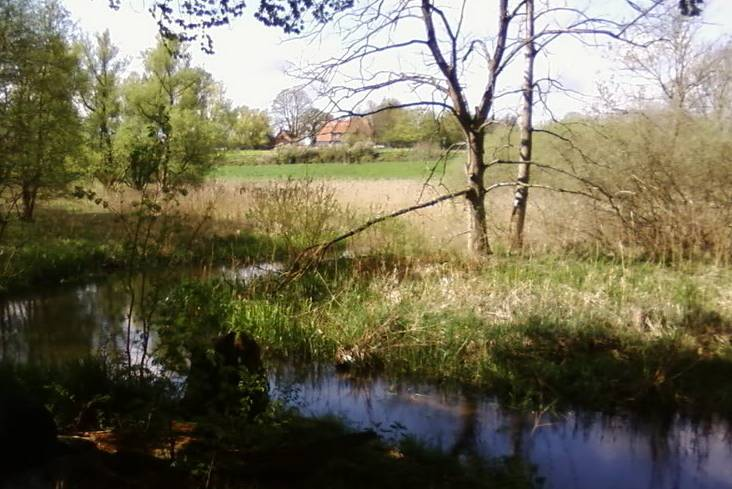

Location
- Country: Germany
- States: Mecklenburg-Vorpommern

Physical characteristics
- Mouth
  - location: Stepenitz
  - coordinates: 53.8547°N 11.1180°E

Basin features
- Progression: Stepenitz→ Trave→ Baltic Sea

The Radegast is a river of Mecklenburg-Vorpommern, Germany. It is a left tributary of the Stepenitz. The Radegast rises in the Nordwestmecklenburg district. It has a length of approximately 34 km. The river drains an area of approximately 190 km².

== See also ==
- List of rivers of Mecklenburg-Vorpommern
