= Goldensee =

Lake in Mecklenburg-Vorpommern, Germany

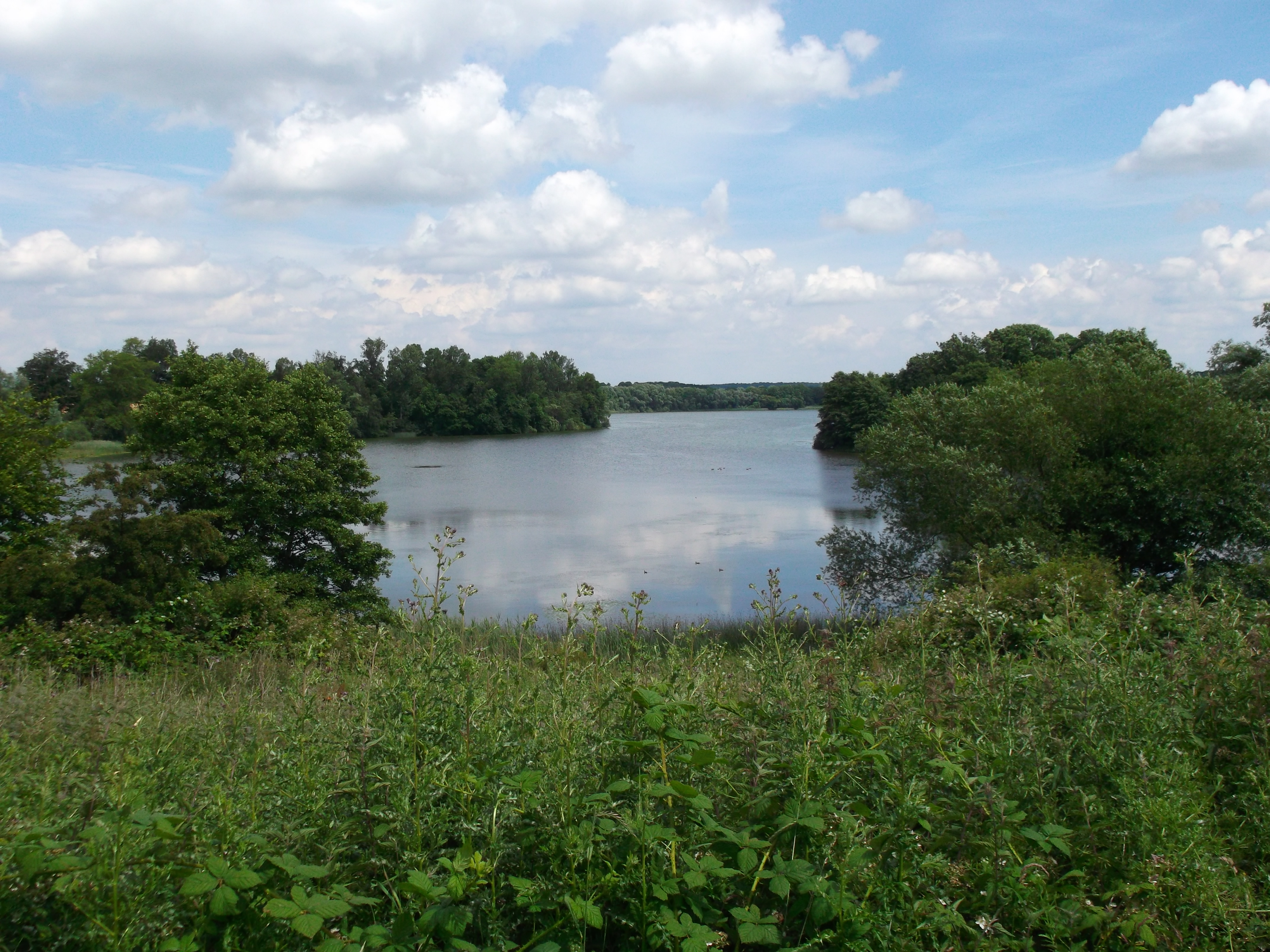
- The lake lies on the border between the Duchy of Lauenburg and Northwest Mecklenburg

- Location within Mecklenburg-Vorpommern
- Location: Nordwestmecklenburg, Mecklenburg-Vorpommern
- Coordinates: 53°41′25″N 10°56′5″E
- Primary inflows: Groß Thurower Bach, Daugner Graben
- Basin countries: Germany
- Surface area: 94 ha (230 acres)
- Average depth: 3–4 m (9.8–13.1 ft)
- Max. depth: 12 m (39 ft)
- Surface elevation: 36.1 m (118 ft)

Goldensee is a lake in the Nordwestmecklenburg district in Mecklenburg-Vorpommern, Germany. At an elevation of 36.1 m (118 ft), its surface area is 0.94 km^{2} (0.36 sq mi).

During the division of Germany, the lake was entirely located in East Germany, but the south/western coast was in West Germany. On January 31, 1951 (before the erection of Inner German border), a 10-year old boy, Harry Krause was shot dead when ice-skating on the frozen lake with friends, when he strayed too close to the Western coast. Officially, ice-skating on the lake was forbidden due to proximity to the border, but it was tolerated by the Grenztruppen. However, on that day, a new border guard, 18-year old Hauptwachtmeister Otto R. had been on duty, and upon spotting Krause, ran off, while unlocking his carbine to fire a warning shot. However, while running, he accidentally fired at waist height, hitting Krause. The border police observed him collapse on the ice, "making tearful noises", and continued their patrol, thinking "border crosser" had been a teenager and it was unlikely that the bullet could have hit him. Krause was pulled to the western bank, where people tried to revive him, but to no avail. Krause's parents only learned about his death through his friends, and his father brought his corpse back across the lake two days later on a sledge.

The doctor of homicide squad investigating the shooting suddenly determined that Krause had died of a heart attack. An autopsy and a reconstruction of the crime were not carried out. Otto R. was given a disciplinary punishment of ten days' arrest and then transferred, but interventions were made as far as the Ministry of Justice and the Secretary of State in order to avert criminal proceedings against him (as shooting at children was actually forbidden at the time). Krause was buried in the Roggendorf cemetery. The incident caused mood swings in the Groß Thurow village. On November 17, 1951, Stasi met with Krause's parents and offered them hush money, but they refused, with his father accusing the Grenztruppen and the public prosecutor of covering up his son's death. Next year, the Krauses were forcibly relocated from Groß Thurow.
