= Großer Wariner See =

Lake in Mecklenburg-Vorpommern, Germany

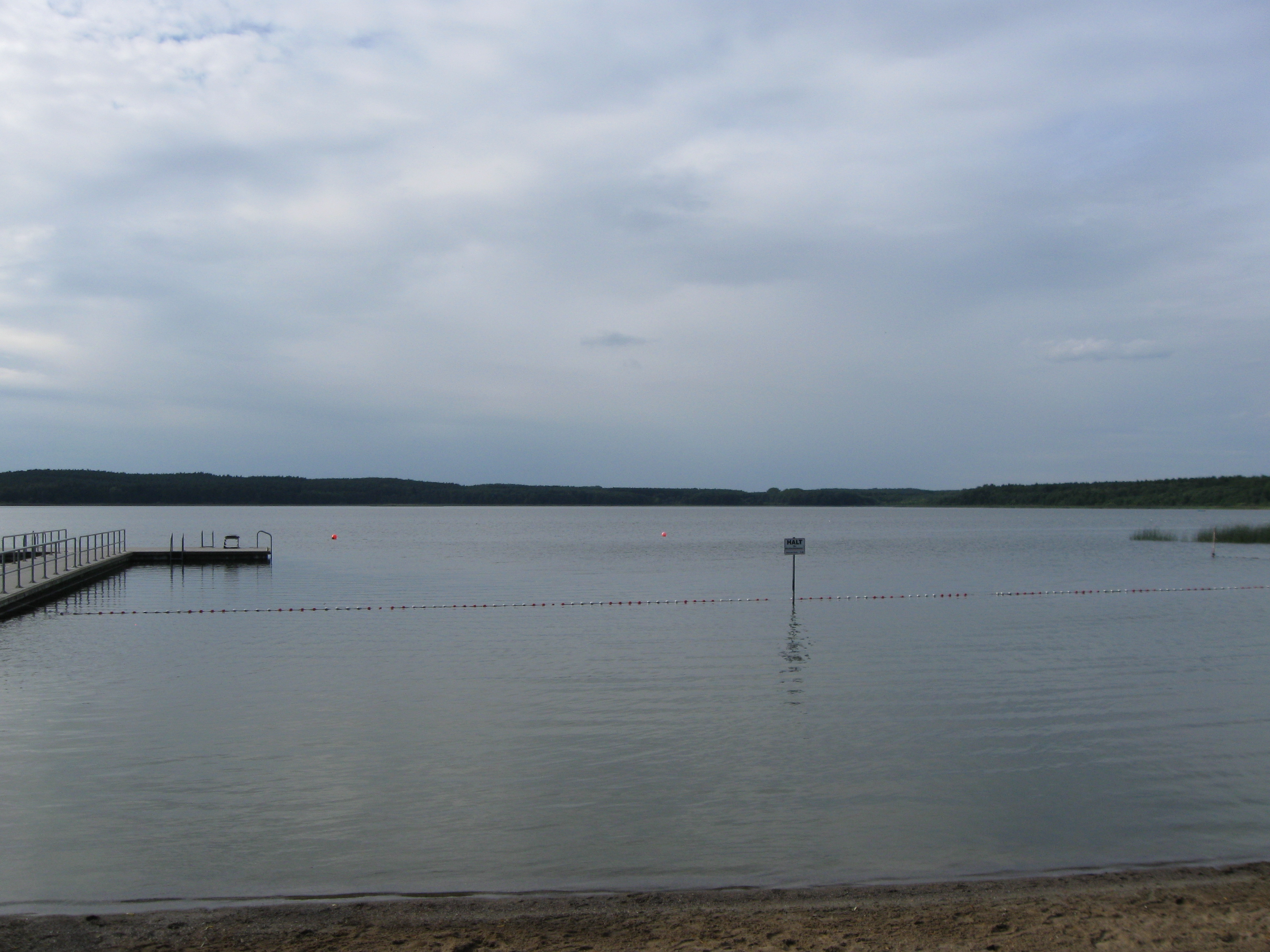
- 2010 Großer Wariner See Wariner Seite

- Location within Mecklenburg-Vorpommern
- Location: Nordwestmecklenburg, Mecklenburg-Vorpommern
- Coordinates: 53°48′46″N 11°41′32″E
- Primary inflows: Teppnitzbach
- Primary outflows: Mühlenbach
- Basin countries: Germany
- Surface area: 2.6 km^{2} (1.0 sq mi)
- Average depth: 4.5 m (15 ft)
- Max. depth: 9.5 m (31 ft)
- Surface elevation: 21.1 m (69 ft)
- Settlements: Warin

Großer Wariner See is a lake in the Nordwestmecklenburg district in Mecklenburg-Vorpommern, Germany. At an elevation of 21.1 m, its surface area is 2.6 km^{2}.
