= Seehof, Germany =

Seehof
- Municipality
- Location of Seehof within Nordwestmecklenburg district
- Interactive map of Seehof
- Location within Germany Location within Mecklenburg-Vorpommern
- Coordinates: 53°42′N 11°25′E
- Country: Germany
- State: Mecklenburg-Vorpommern
- District: Nordwestmecklenburg
- Municipal assoc.: Lützow-Lübstorf

Government
  - Mayor: Christiane Schwonbeck

Area
  - Total: 4.33 km^{2} (1.67 sq mi)
- Elevation: 39 m (128 ft)

Population (2025-12-31)
  - Total: 934
  - Density: 216/km^{2} (559/sq mi)
- Time zone: UTC+01:00 (CET)
  - Summer (DST): UTC+02:00 (CEST)
- Postal codes: 19069
- Dialling codes: 0385
- Vehicle registration: NWM
- Website: www.amt-luetzow.de

Seehof is a municipality in the Nordwestmecklenburg district, in Mecklenburg-Vorpommern, Germany.
