= Fischteich =

Lake in Mecklenburg-Vorpommern, Germany

- Location within Mecklenburg-Vorpommern
- Location: Nordwestmecklenburg, Mecklenburg-Vorpommern
- Coordinates: 53.869°N 11.46961°E
- Basin countries: Germany
- Surface area: 0.266 km^{2} (0.103 sq mi)
- Surface elevation: 6.8 m (22 ft)

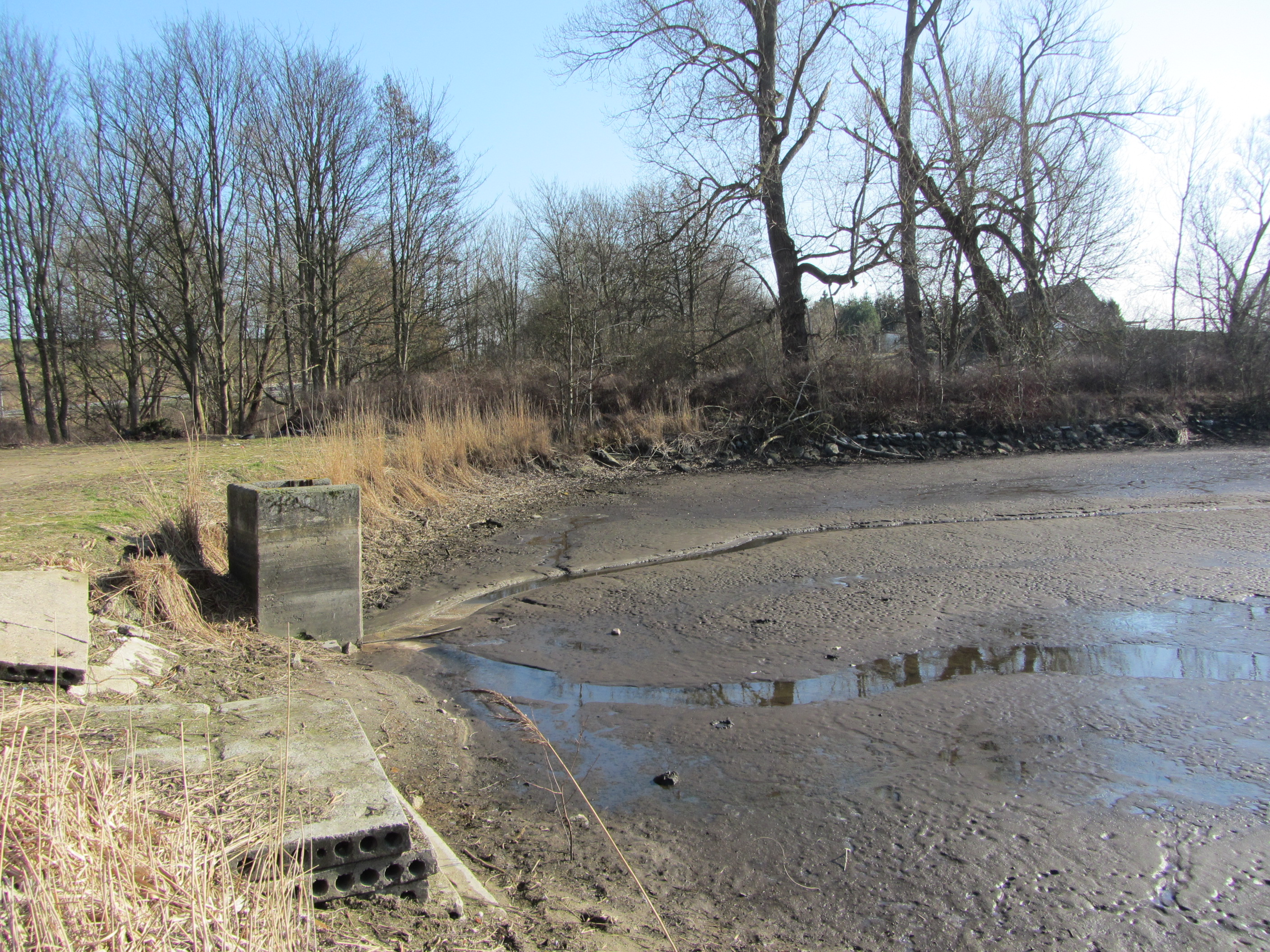

Fischteich is a lake in the Nordwestmecklenburg district in Mecklenburg-Vorpommern, Germany. At an elevation of 6.8 m, its surface area is 0.266 km².
