= Ziegelsee =

Lake in Mecklenburg-Vorpommern, Germany

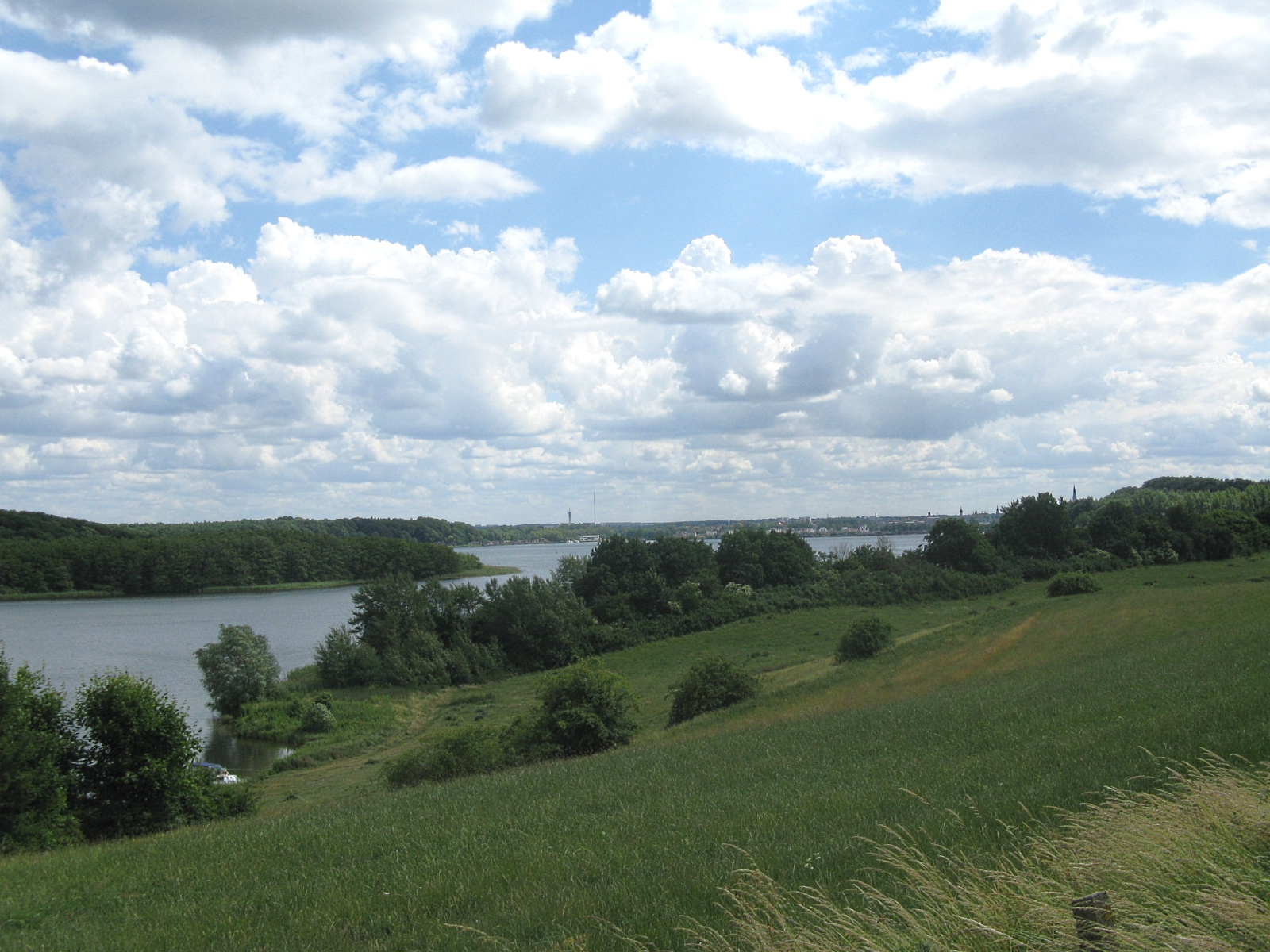

- Location within Germany
- Location: Nordwestmecklenburg, Mecklenburg-Vorpommern
- Coordinates: 53°39′17″N 11°25′24″E
- Primary inflows: Aubach
- Primary outflows: canal
- Basin countries: Germany
- Surface area: 3 km^{2} (1.2 sq mi)
- Average depth: 10 m (33 ft)
- Max. depth: 34.4 m (113 ft)
- Water volume: 30,000,000 m^{3} (1.1×10^{9} cu ft)
- Surface elevation: 37.8 m (124 ft)
- Settlements: Schwerin

Ziegelsee is a lake in Nordwestmecklenburg, Mecklenburg-Vorpommern, Germany. At an elevation of 37.8 metres (124 ft), its surface covers 3 square kilometres (1.2 mi^{2}).
