= Röggeliner See =

Lake in Germany

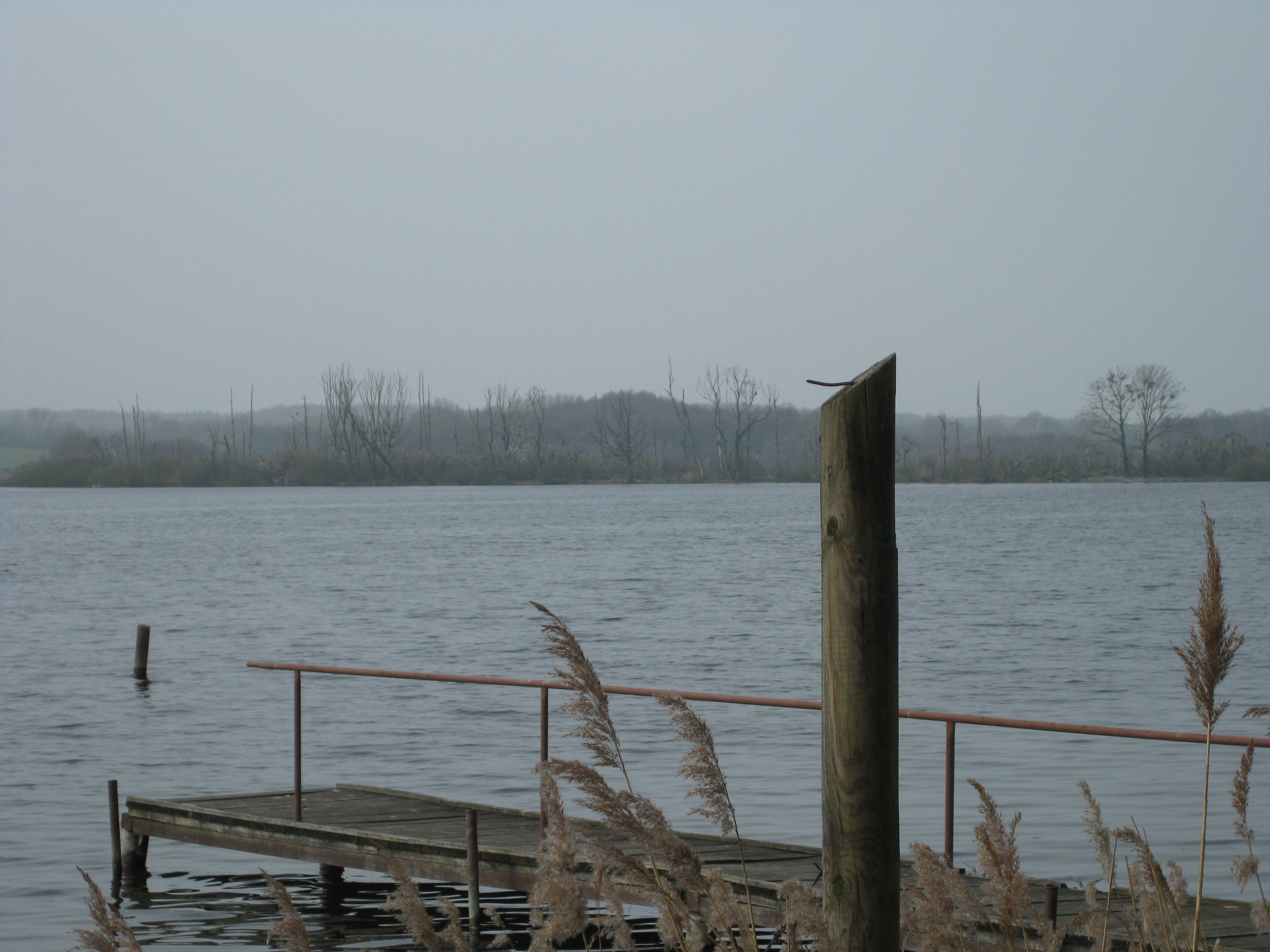

- Location within Mecklenburg-Vorpommern
- Location: Nordwestmecklenburg, Mecklenburg-Vorpommern
- Coordinates: 53°43′45″N 10°55′48″E
- Basin countries: Germany
- Surface area: 1.77 km^{2} (0.68 sq mi)
- Average depth: 2.9 m (9 ft 6 in)
- Max. depth: 6.8 m (22 ft)
- Surface elevation: 37.2 m (122 ft)

Röggeliner See is a lake in the Nordwestmecklenburg district in Mecklenburg-Vorpommern, Germany. At an elevation of 37.2 m, its surface area is 1.77 km^{2}.
