= Neuhofer See =

Lake in Germany

- Location within Mecklenburg-Vorpommern
- Location: Nordwestmecklenburg, Mecklenburg-Vorpommern
- Coordinates: 53°46′11″N 11°39′26″E
- Primary inflows: Mühlenbach
- Primary outflows: Mühlenbach
- Basin countries: Germany
- Surface area: 0.79 km^{2} (0.31 sq mi)
- Max. depth: 15.1 m (50 ft)
- Surface elevation: 18.1 m (59 ft)

Neuhofer See is a lake in the Nordwestmecklenburg district in Mecklenburg-Vorpommern, Germany. At an elevation of 18.1 m, its surface area is 0.79 km^{2}.
