= Heidensee =

Lake in Mecklenburg-Vorpommern, Germany

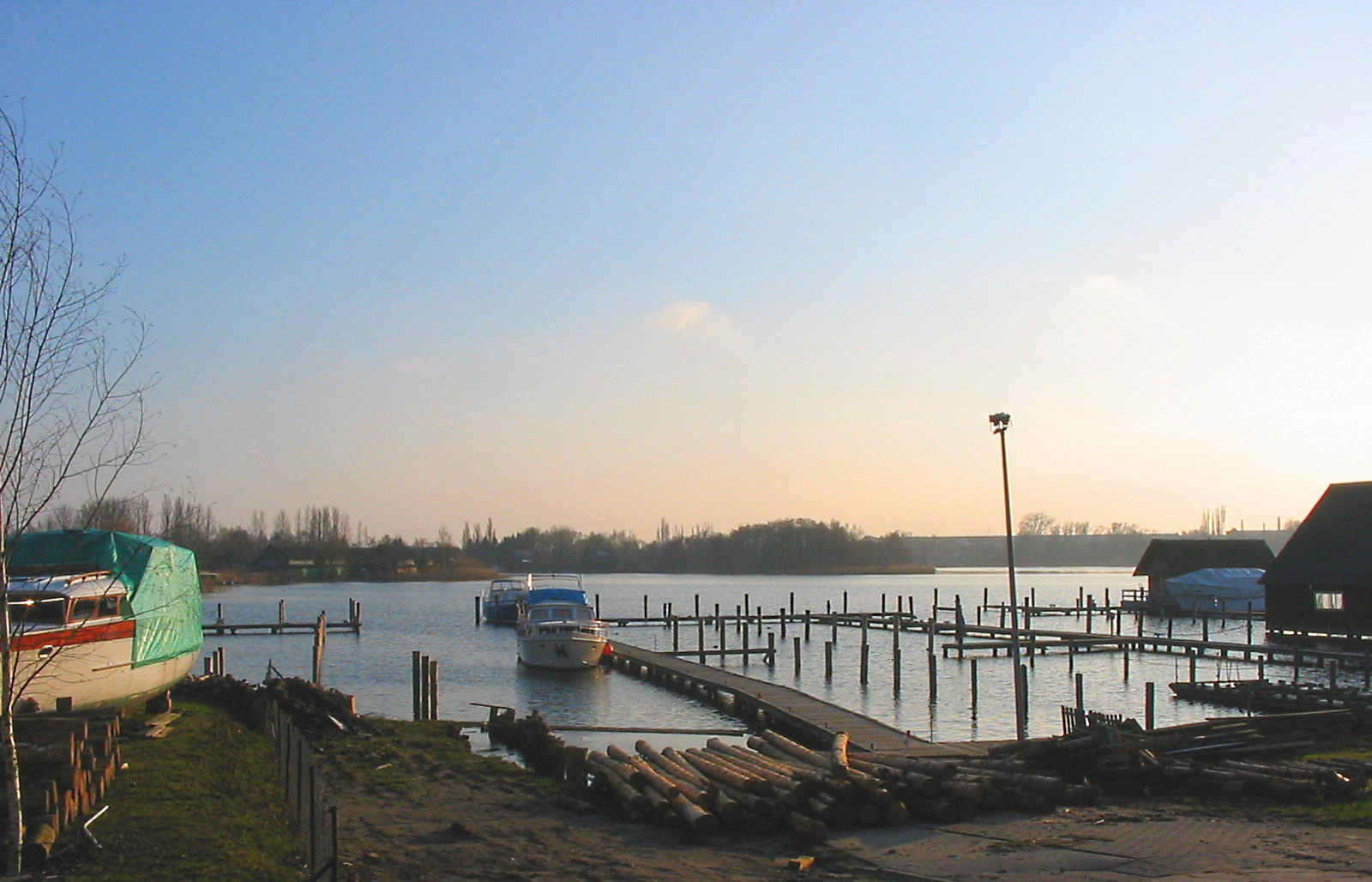

- Location within Mecklenburg-Vorpommern
- Location: Nordwestmecklenburg, Mecklenburg-Vorpommern
- Coordinates: 53°38′36″N 11°25′55″E
- Primary outflows: Stangengraben
- Basin countries: Germany
- Surface area: 0.24 km^{2} (0.093 sq mi)
- Average depth: 2.2 m (7 ft 3 in)
- Max. depth: 3.9 m (13 ft)
- Surface elevation: 37.8 m (124 ft)
- Settlements: Schwerin

Heidensee is a lake in Nordwestmecklenburg, Mecklenburg-Vorpommern, Germany. At an elevation of 37.8 m, its surface area is 0.24 km^{2}.
