= Kleiner Dambecker See =

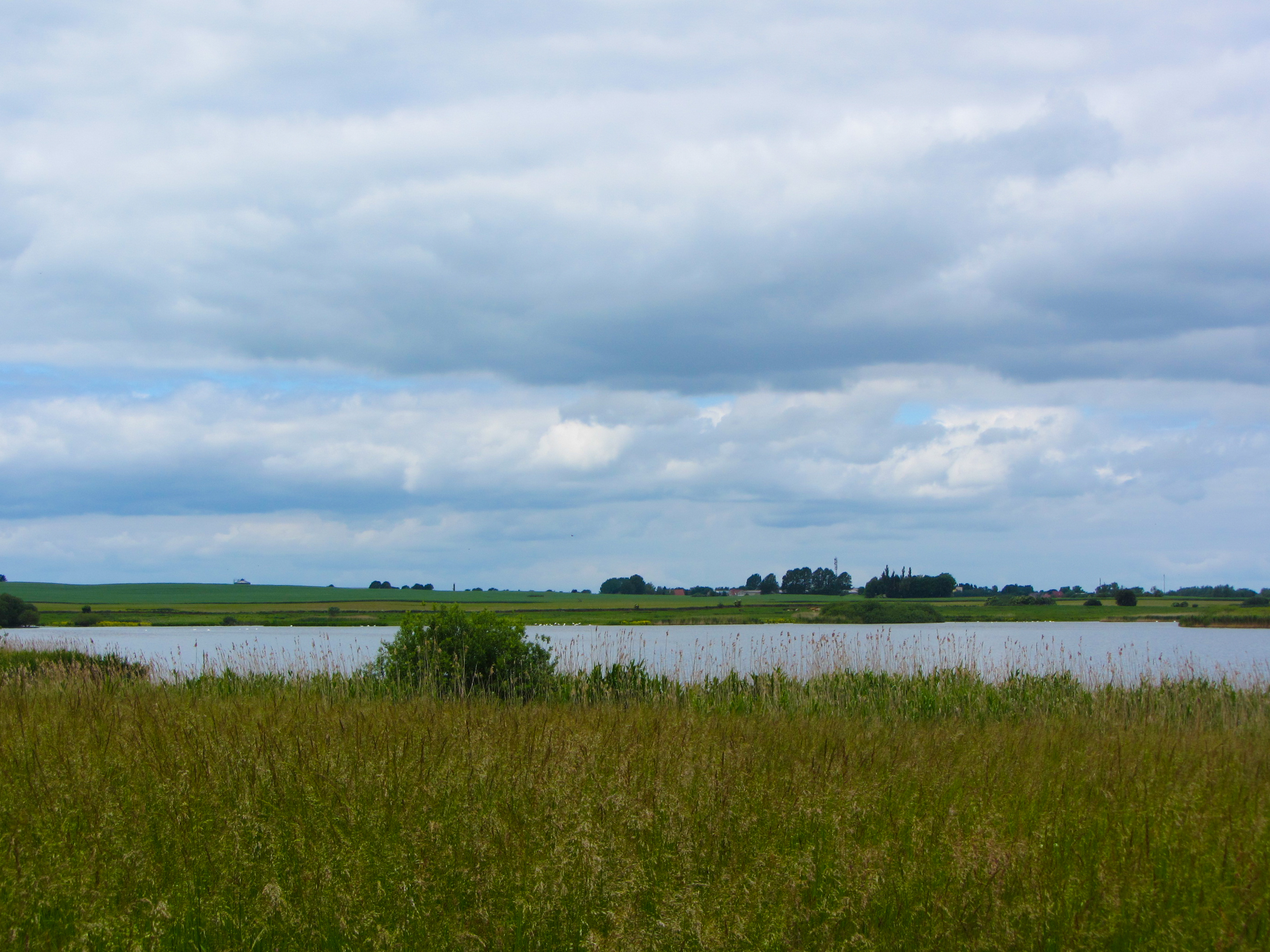
- Kleiner Dambecker See near Naudin, district Nordwestmecklenburg, Mecklenburg-Vorpommern, Germany.2014

- Location within Mecklenburg-Vorpommern
- Location: Nordwestmecklenburg, Mecklenburg-Vorpommern
- Coordinates: 53°47′19″N 11°22′50″E
- Type: natural freshwater lake
- Basin countries: Germany
- Max. length: 1.11 km (0.69 mi)
- Max. width: 0.93 km (0.58 mi)
- Surface area: 0.42 km^{2} (0.16 sq mi)
- Average depth: 0.7 m (2.3 ft)
- Max. depth: 2 m (6.6 ft)
- Surface elevation: 52.4 m (172 ft)

Kleiner Dambecker See is a lake in Nordwestmecklenburg, Mecklenburg-Vorpommern, Germany. At an elevation of 52.4 m, its surface area is 0.42 km^{2}.
