= Kirch Stücker See =

Lake in Germany

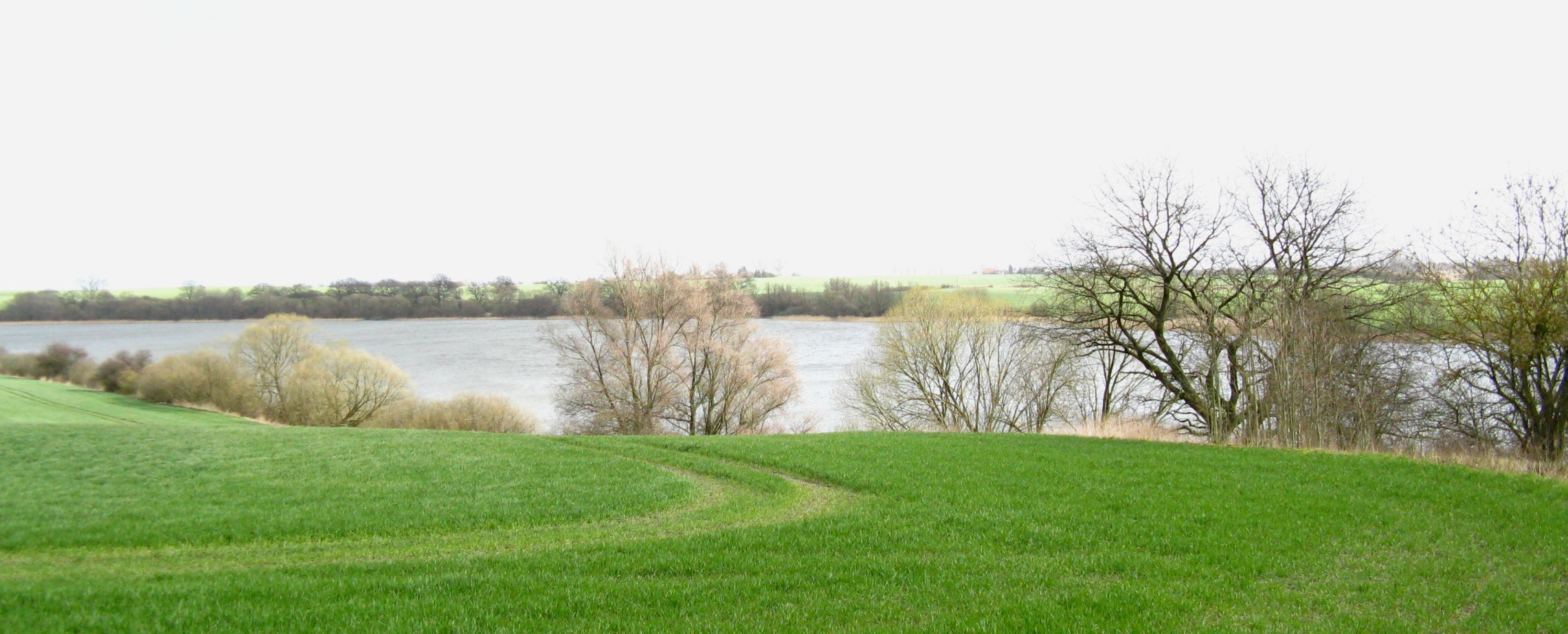

- Location within Mecklenburg-Vorpommern
- Location: Nordwestmecklenburg, Mecklenburg-Vorpommern
- Coordinates: 53°41′31″N 11°24′24″E
- Basin countries: Germany
- Surface area: 0.37 km^{2} (0.14 sq mi)
- Surface elevation: 40 m (130 ft)

Kirch Stücker See is a lake in Nordwestmecklenburg, Mecklenburg-Vorpommern, Germany. At an elevation of 40 m, its surface area is 0.37 km^{2}.
