= Ploggensee =

Lake in Germany

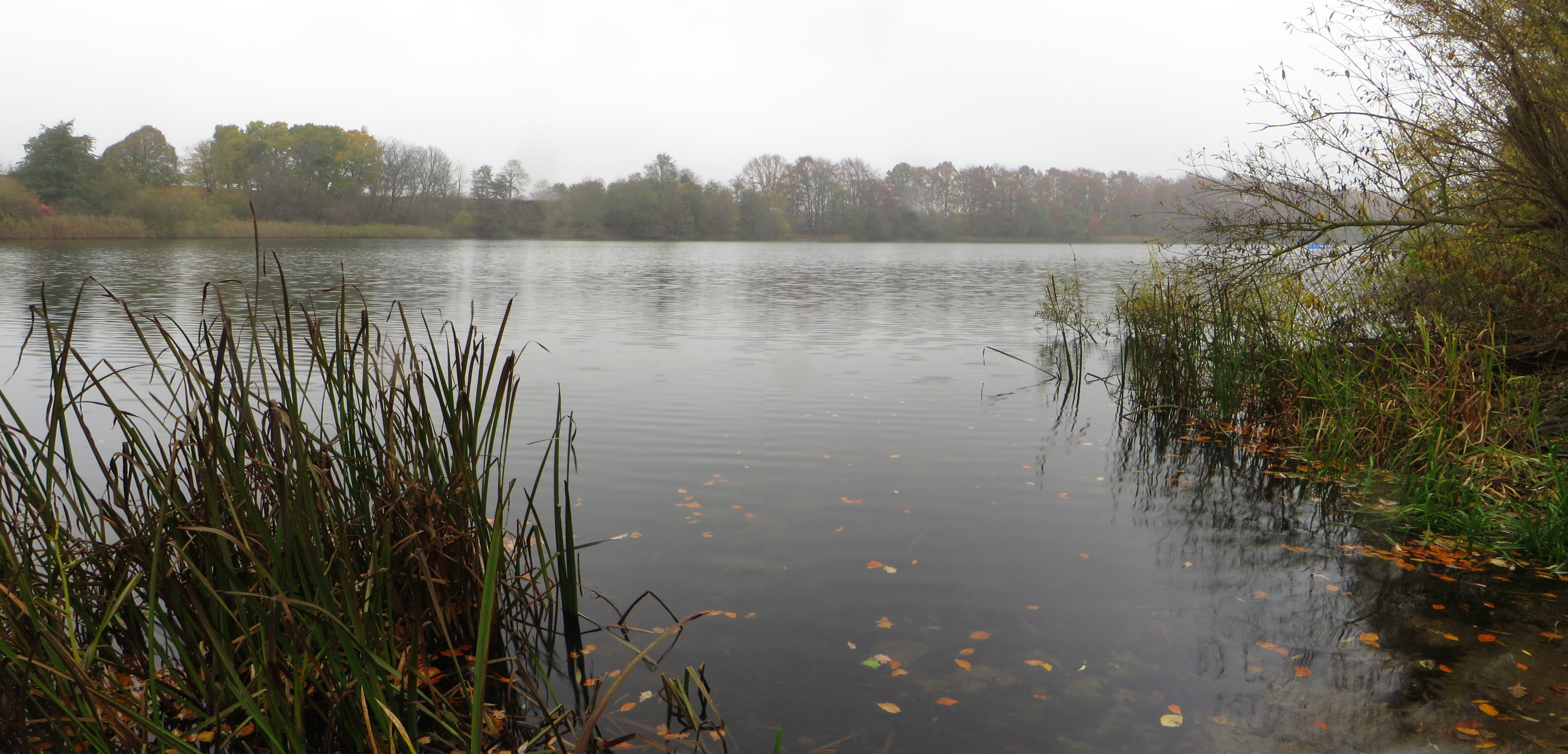

- Location within Mecklenburg-Vorpommern
- Location: Nordwestmecklenburg, Mecklenburg-Vorpommern
- Coordinates: 53°52′4″N 11°12′1″E
- Basin countries: Germany
- Surface area: 0.15 km^{2} (0.058 sq mi)
- Average depth: 5 m (16 ft)
- Max. depth: 7 m (23 ft)
- Surface elevation: 32.9 m (108 ft)
- Settlements: Grevesmühlen

Ploggensee is a lake in the Nordwestmecklenburg district in Mecklenburg-Vorpommern, Germany. At an elevation of 32.9 m, its surface area is 0.15 km^{2}.
