= Tramser See =

Lake in Mecklenburg-Vorpommern, Germany

- Location within Mecklenburg-Vorpommern
- Location: Nordwestmecklenburg, Mecklenburg-Vorpommern
- Coordinates: 53.81449°N 11.61903°E
- Primary inflows: Pröbbower See
- Basin countries: Germany
- Surface area: 0.26 km^{2} (0.10 sq mi)
- Surface elevation: 31.9 m (105 ft)

Tramser See is a lake in the Nordwestmecklenburg district in Mecklenburg-Vorpommern, Germany. At an elevation of 31.9 m, its surface area is 0.26 km^{2}.
