= Reinstorfer See =

Lake in Germany

- Location within Mecklenburg-Vorpommern
- Location: Nordwestmecklenburg, Mecklenburg-Vorpommern
- Coordinates: 53.85675°N 11.63216°E
- Basin countries: Germany
- Surface area: 0.074 km^{2} (0.029 sq mi)
- Surface elevation: 46.9 m (154 ft)

Reinstorfer See is a lake in the Nordwestmecklenburg district in Mecklenburg-Vorpommern, Germany. It has an elevation of 46.9 metres and a surface area of 0.074 km². It is located northeast of the eponymous village Reinstorf not far from the main road 192 in the midst of a bog and reed area. The lake has a north-south extension of about 430 meters and a west-east extension of about 220 meters. The marshy bank is completely wooded and drained. As a result, the water level dropped to the current level. The surrounding heights reach southeast of the lake over sixty meters NHN .
