= Großer Dambecker See =

Lake in Bobitz, Mecklenburg-Vorpommern, Germany

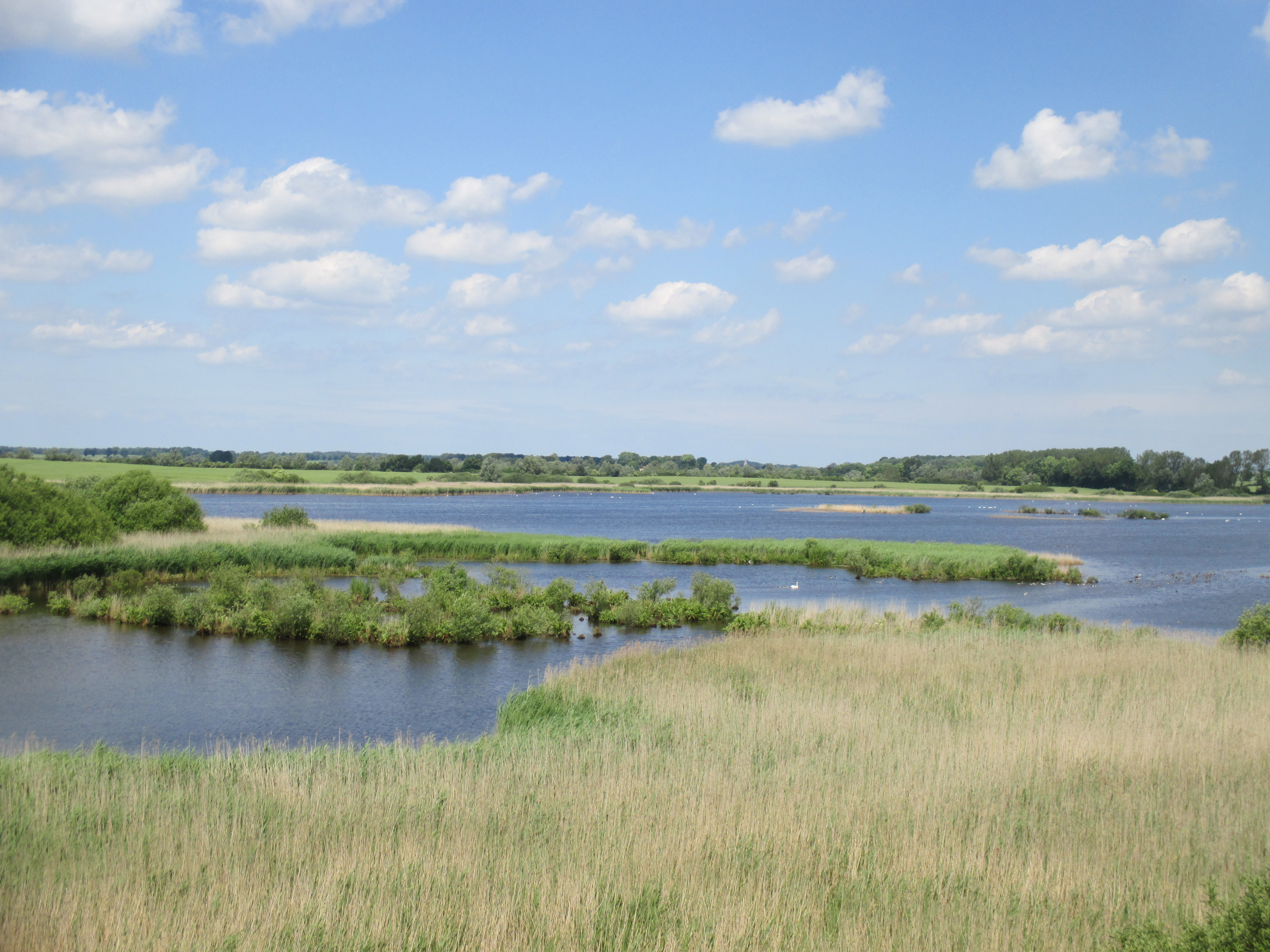

- Location within Mecklenburg-Vorpommern
- Location: Nordwestmecklenburg, Mecklenburg-Vorpommern, Germany
- Coordinates: 53°46′51″N 11°23′31″E
- Primary outflows: Aubach
- Basin countries: Germany
- Surface area: 0.94 km^{2} (0.36 sq mi)
- Average depth: 0.8 m (2 ft 7 in)
- Max. depth: 2.1 m (6 ft 11 in)
- Surface elevation: 52.4 m (172 ft)

Großer Dambecker See is a lake in the Nordwestmecklenburg district in Mecklenburg-Vorpommern, Germany. At an elevation of 52.4 m (172 ft), its surface area is 0.94 km (0.58 mi).
