= Dalberg-Wendelstorf =

- Municipality
- Location of Dalberg-Wendelstorf within Nordwestmecklenburg district
- Interactive map of Dalberg-Wendelstorf
- Location within Germany Location within Mecklenburg-Vorpommern
- Coordinates: 53°43′N 11°16′E
- Country: Germany
- State: Mecklenburg-Vorpommern
- District: Nordwestmecklenburg
- Municipal assoc.: Lützow-Lübstorf

Government
  - Mayor: Helmut Haberer

Area
  - Total: 9.50 km^{2} (3.67 sq mi)
- Elevation: 50 m (160 ft)

Population (2025-12-31)
  - Total: 538
  - Density: 56.6/km^{2} (147/sq mi)
- Time zone: UTC+01:00 (CET)
  - Summer (DST): UTC+02:00 (CEST)
- Postal codes: 19071
- Dialling codes: 038871
- Vehicle registration: NWM

Dalberg-Wendelstorf is a municipality in the Nordwestmecklenburg district, in Mecklenburg-Vorpommern, Germany.
