= Santower See =

Lake in Germany

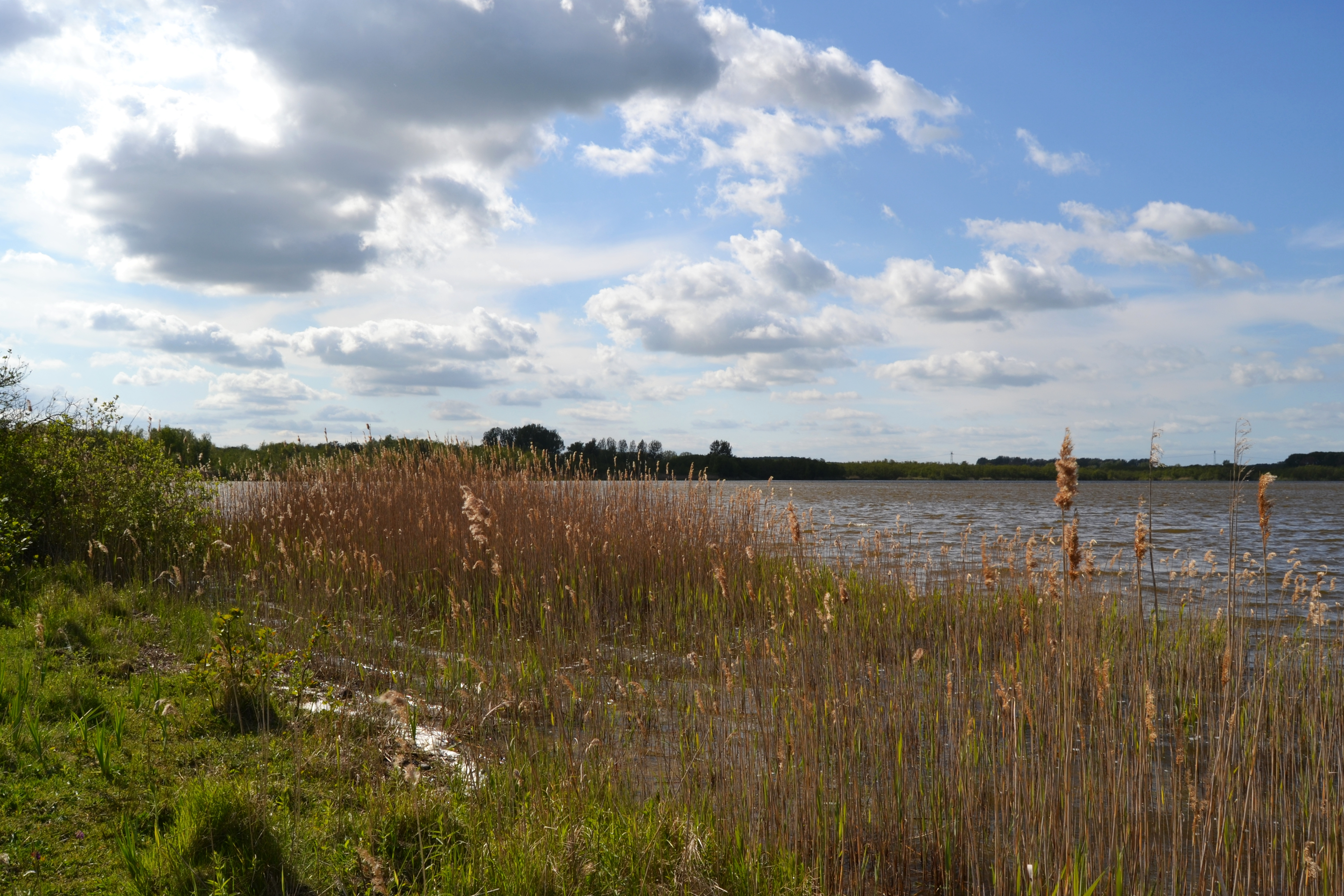

- Location within Mecklenburg-Vorpommern
- Location: Nordwestmecklenburg, Mecklenburg-Vorpommern
- Coordinates: 53.882°N 11.201°E
- Primary inflows: none
- Primary outflows: Schleusgraben/Tarnewitzer Bach
- Basin countries: Germany
- Surface area: 1.03 km^{2} (0.40 sq mi)
- Average depth: 1–1.5 m (3 ft 3 in – 4 ft 11 in)
- Max. depth: 3.5 m (11 ft)
- Surface elevation: 36 m (118 ft)

Santower See is a lake in the Nordwestmecklenburg district in Mecklenburg-Vorpommern, Germany. At an elevation of 36 m, its surface area is 1.03 km^{2}.

The lake is home to biodiverse flora and fauna which is protected by the local government, and had agricultural uses in the past. One of the islands on the lake also has a historic ruin on it.
