= Cambser See =

Lake in Germany

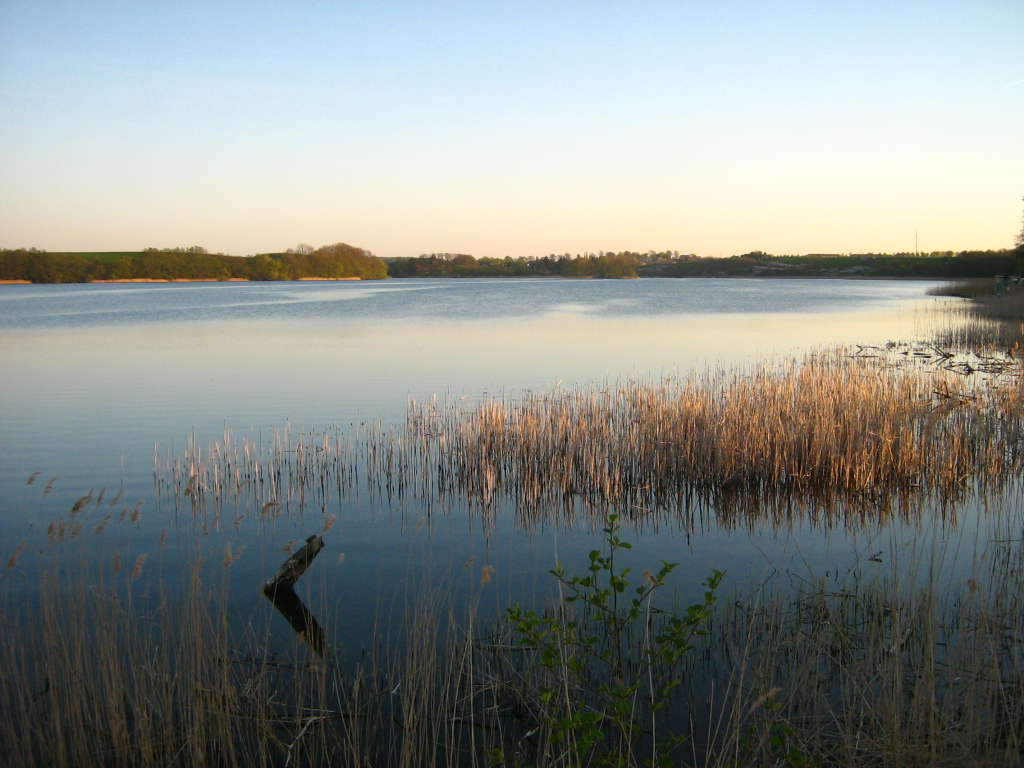

- Location within Mecklenburg-Vorpommern
- Location: Nordwestmecklenburg, Mecklenburg-Vorpommern
- Coordinates: 53°40′43″N 11°32′8″E
- Basin countries: Germany
- Surface area: 2.85 km^{2} (1.10 sq mi)
- Max. depth: 27.6 m (91 ft)
- Surface elevation: 30.9 m (101 ft)

Cambser See is a lake in Nordwestmecklenburg, Mecklenburg-Vorpommern, Germany. At an elevation of 30.9 m, its surface area is 2.85 km².
