= Groß Labenzer See =

Lake in Mecklenburg-Vorpommern, Germany

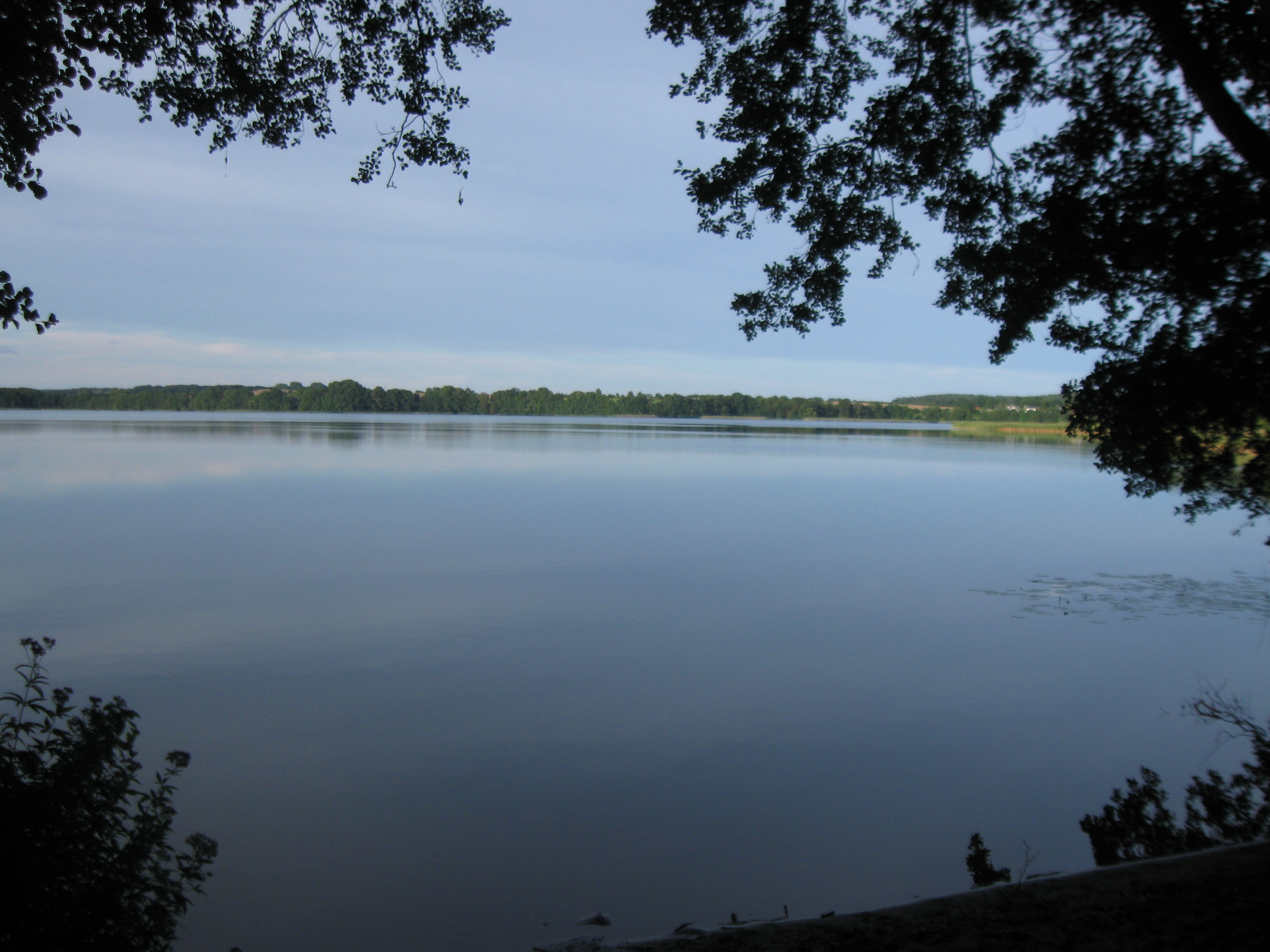

- Location within Mecklenburg-Vorpommern
- Location: Nordwestmecklenburg, Mecklenburg-Vorpommern
- Coordinates: 53°46′53″N 11°45′44″E
- Primary inflows: Radebach, Seebach
- Basin countries: Germany
- Surface area: 2.3 km^{2} (0.89 sq mi)
- Average depth: 10.2 m (33 ft)
- Max. depth: 34.9 m (115 ft)
- Surface elevation: 24.6 m (81 ft)

Groß Labenzer See is a lake in the Nordwestmecklenburg district in Mecklenburg-Vorpommern, Germany. At an elevation of 24.6 m, its surface area is 2.3 km^{2}.
