= Cramonshagen =

- Municipality
- Location of Cramonshagen within Nordwestmecklenburg district
- Interactive map of Cramonshagen
- Location within Germany Location within Mecklenburg-Vorpommern
- Coordinates: 53°42′N 11°17′E
- Country: Germany
- State: Mecklenburg-Vorpommern
- District: Nordwestmecklenburg
- Municipal assoc.: Lützow-Lübstorf

Government
  - Mayor: Ulrich Lückstädt

Area
  - Total: 10.12 km^{2} (3.91 sq mi)
- Elevation: 49 m (161 ft)

Population (2025-12-31)
  - Total: 511
  - Density: 50.5/km^{2} (131/sq mi)
- Time zone: UTC+01:00 (CET)
  - Summer (DST): UTC+02:00 (CEST)
- Postal codes: 19071
- Dialling codes: 038871
- Vehicle registration: NWM

Cramonshagen is a municipality in the Nordwestmecklenburg district, in Mecklenburg-Vorpommern, Germany.
