= Neuklostersee =

Lake in Mecklenburg-Vorpommern, Germany

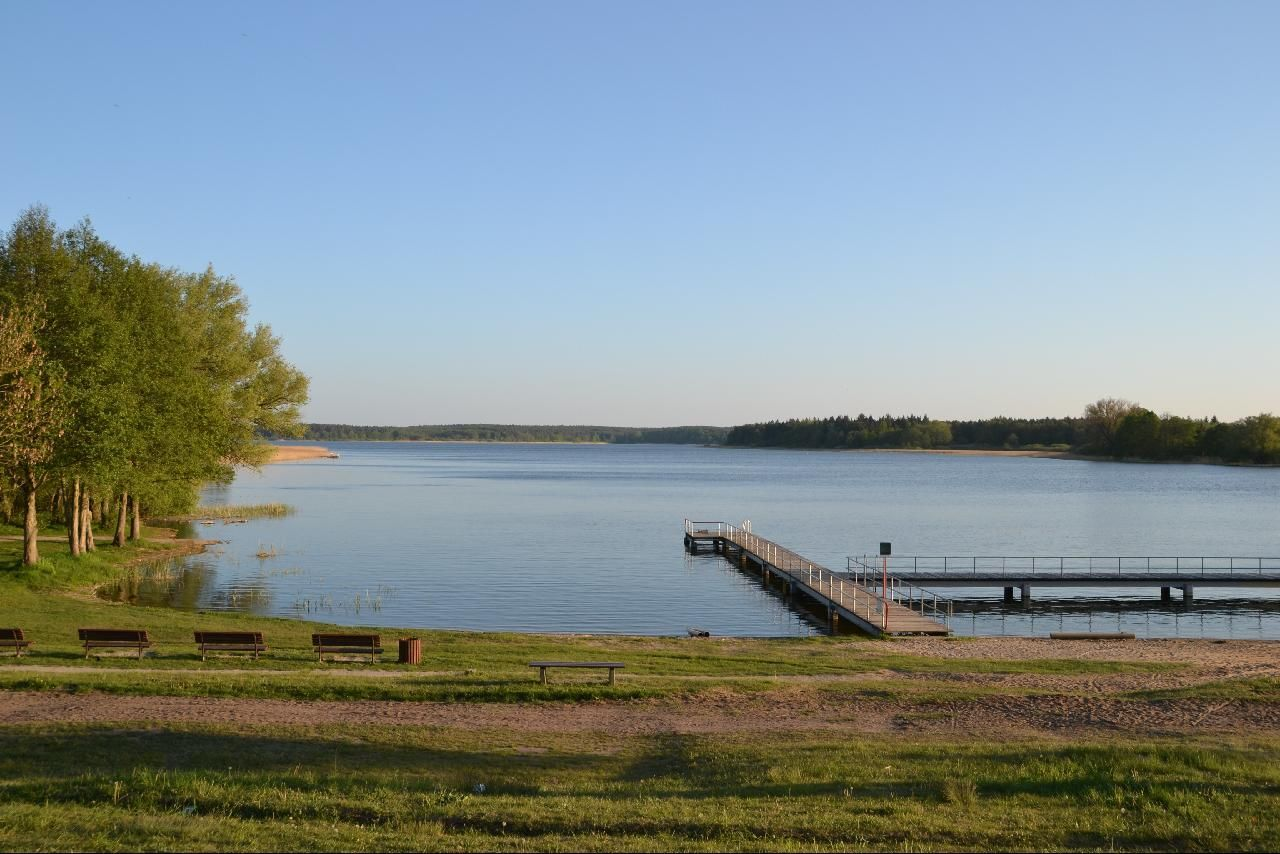

- Location within Mecklenburg-Vorpommern
- Location: Nordwestmecklenburg, Mecklenburg-Vorpommern, Germany
- Coordinates: 53°50′58″N 11°42′10″E
- Primary inflows: Klaasbach
- Primary outflows: Teppnitzbach
- Basin countries: Germany
- Surface area: 2.69 km^{2} (1.04 sq mi)
- Average depth: 4.5 m (15 ft)
- Max. depth: 10.3 m (34 ft)
- Surface elevation: 25.2 m (83 ft)

Neuklostersee is a lake in the Nordwestmecklenburg district in Mecklenburg-Vorpommern, Germany. Its elevation is 25.2 m (83 ft) and surface area is 2.69 km^{2} (1.04 sq mi).
