= Ostorfer See =

Lake in Mecklenburg-Vorpommern, Germany

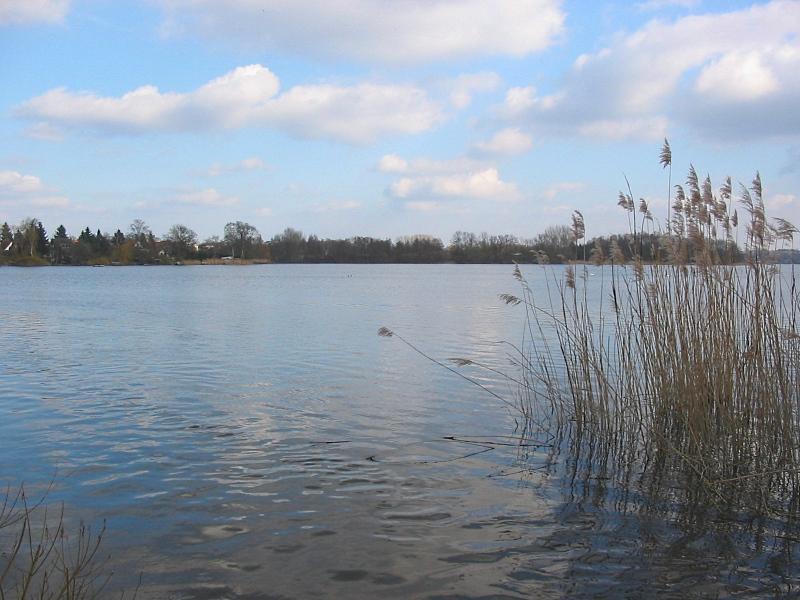

- Location within Mecklenburg-Vorpommern
- Location: Nordwestmecklenburg, Mecklenburg-Vorpommern
- Coordinates: 53°36′48″N 11°23′39″E
- Primary inflows: Nuddelbach
- Primary outflows: Püsselbeke
- Basin countries: Germany
- Surface area: 2.089 km^{2} (0.807 sq mi)
- Average depth: 2.9 m (9 ft 6 in)
- Max. depth: 5.1 m (17 ft)
- Surface elevation: 39.5 m (130 ft)
- Settlements: Schwerin

Ostorfer See is a lake in Nordwestmecklenburg, Mecklenburg-Vorpommern, Germany. At an elevation of 39.5 m, its surface area is 2.089 km². Its average depth is 2.9 meters and maximum depth is 5.1 meters.
