= Rüting =

- Municipality
- Location of Rüting within Nordwestmecklenburg district
- Interactive map of Rüting
- Location within Germany Location within Mecklenburg-Vorpommern
- Coordinates: 53°46′N 11°13′E
- Country: Germany
- State: Mecklenburg-Vorpommern
- District: Nordwestmecklenburg
- Municipal assoc.: Grevesmühlen-Land

Government
  - Mayor: Holger Hinze

Area
  - Total: 15.15 km^{2} (5.85 sq mi)
- Elevation: 38 m (125 ft)

Population (2025-12-31)
  - Total: 547
  - Density: 36.1/km^{2} (93.5/sq mi)
- Time zone: UTC+01:00 (CET)
  - Summer (DST): UTC+02:00 (CEST)
- Postal codes: 23936
- Dialling codes: 038822
- Vehicle registration: NWM
- Website: www.grevesmuehlen.de

Rüting is a municipality in the Nordwestmecklenburg district, in Mecklenburg-Vorpommern, Germany.
