= Brüeler Bach =

River in Germany

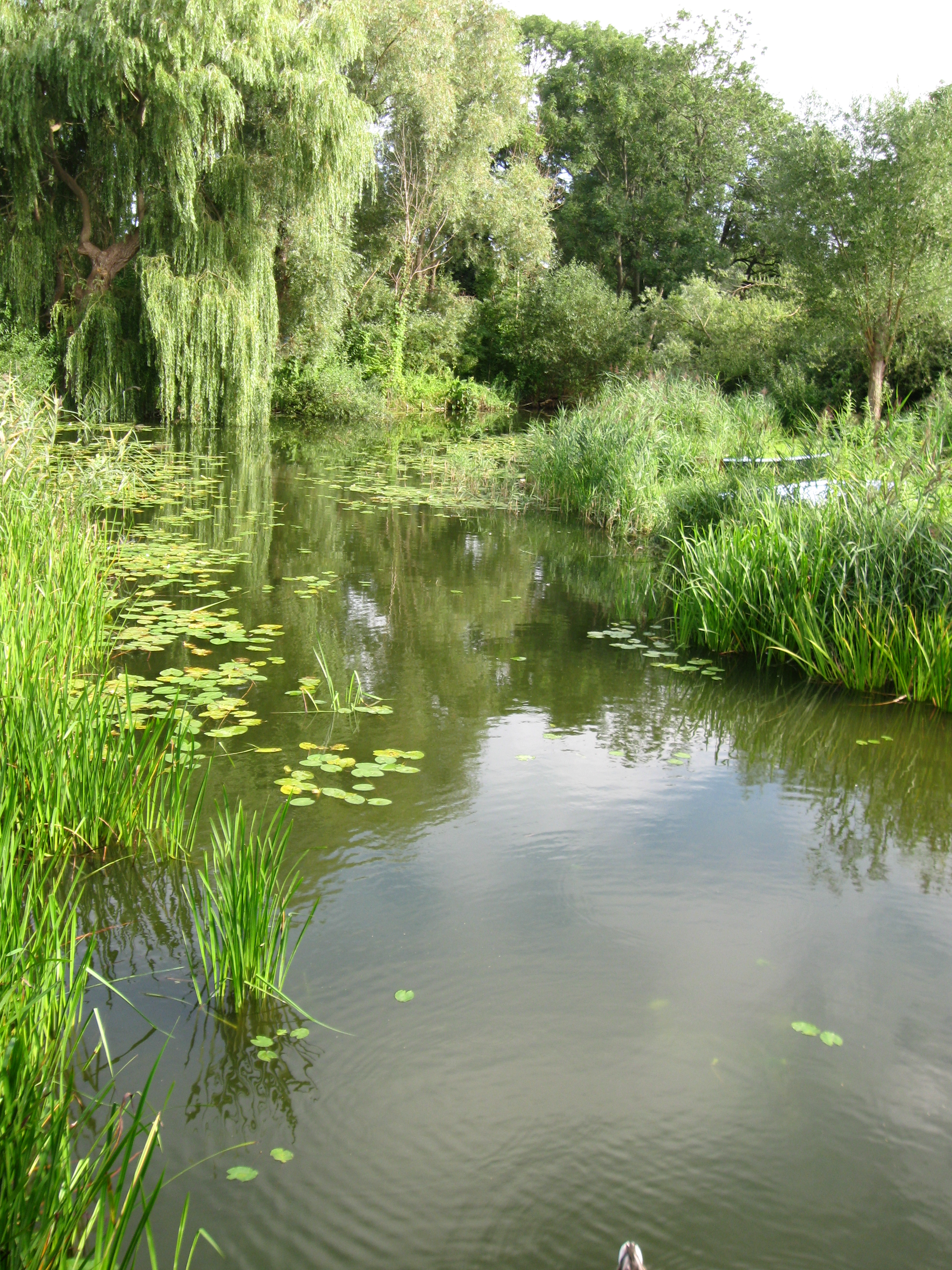

Location
- Country: Germany
- State: Mecklenburg-Vorpommern

Physical characteristics
- Mouth
  - location: Warnow
  - coordinates: 53°43′15″N 11°44′55″E

Basin features
- Progression: Warnow→ Baltic Sea

Brüeler Bach is a river of Mecklenburg-Vorpommern, Germany. It flows into the Warnow in Weitendorf.

== See also ==
- List of rivers of Mecklenburg-Vorpommern
