= Burgsee =

Burgsee may refer to:

- Burgsee (Schwerin)
- Burgsee (Schleswig)
