= Schwerin =

Capital of Mecklenburg-Vorpommern, Germany

- Town
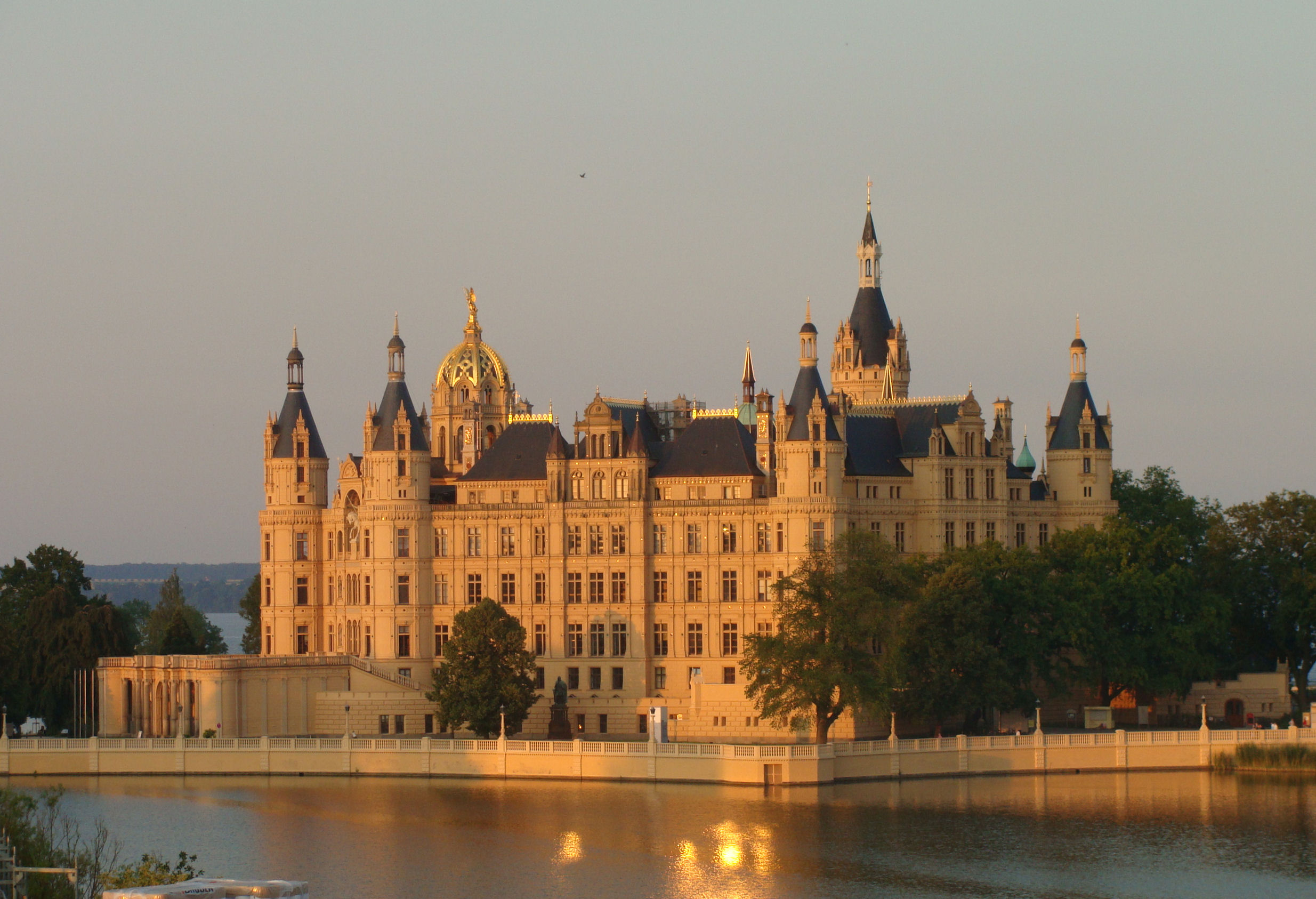
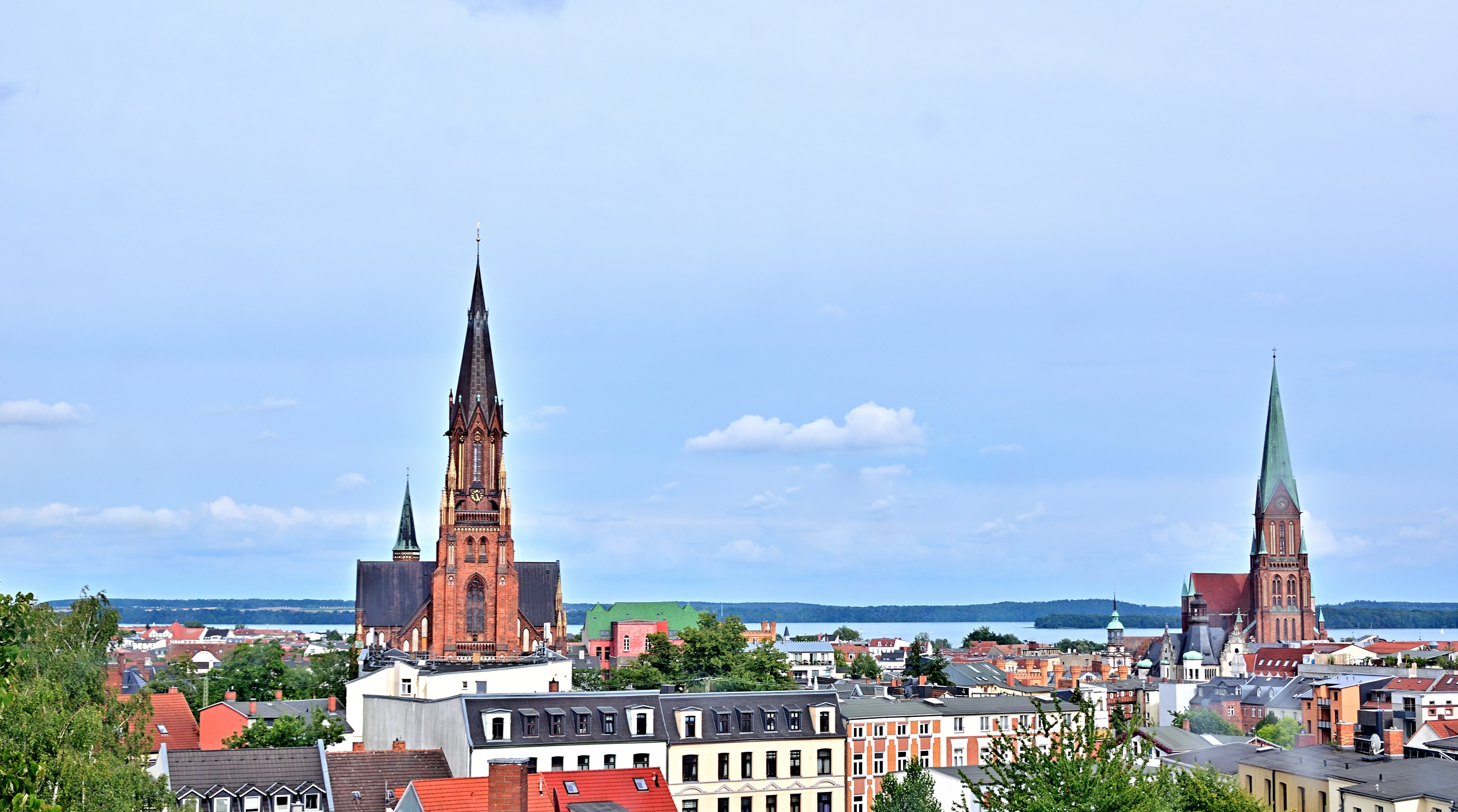
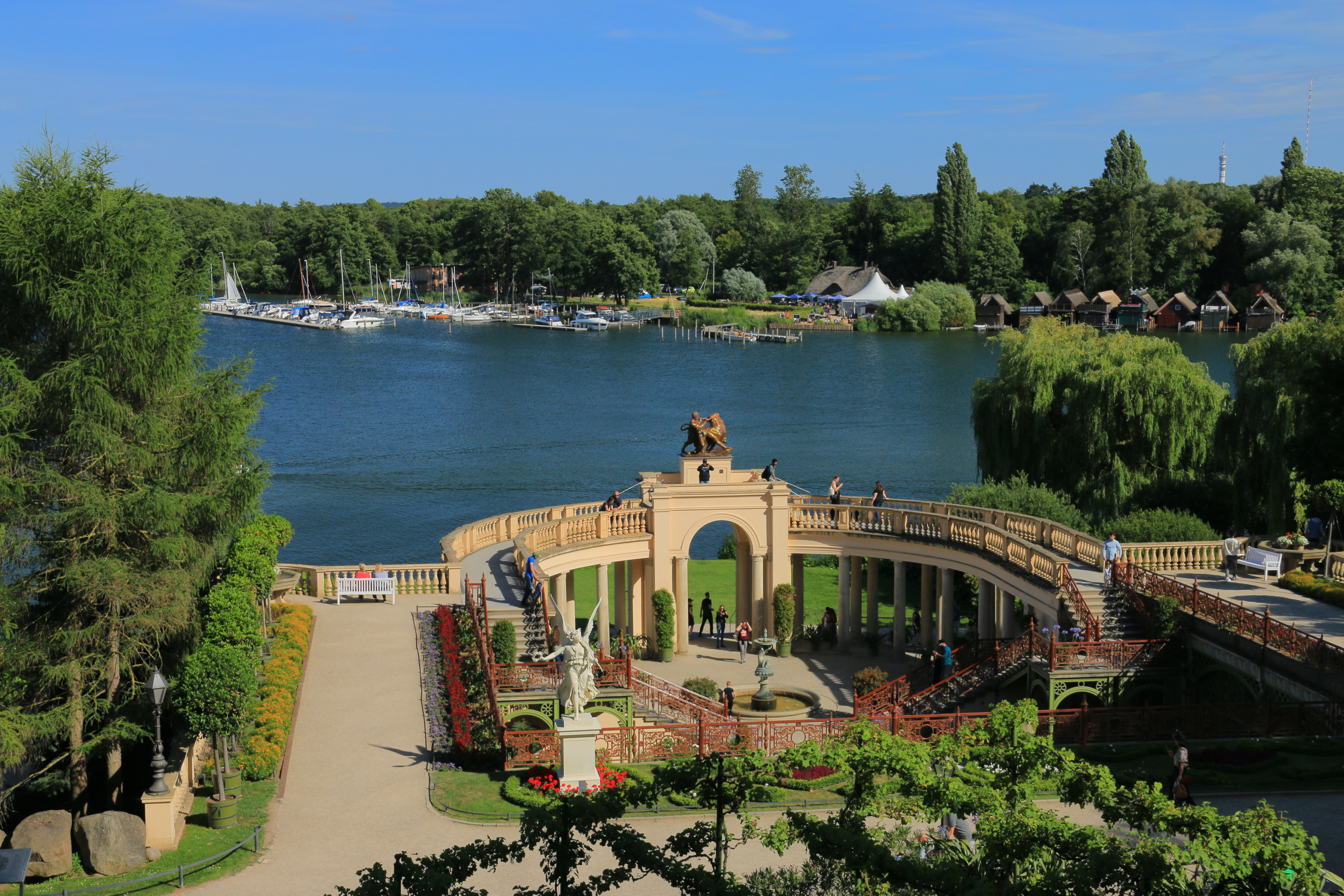
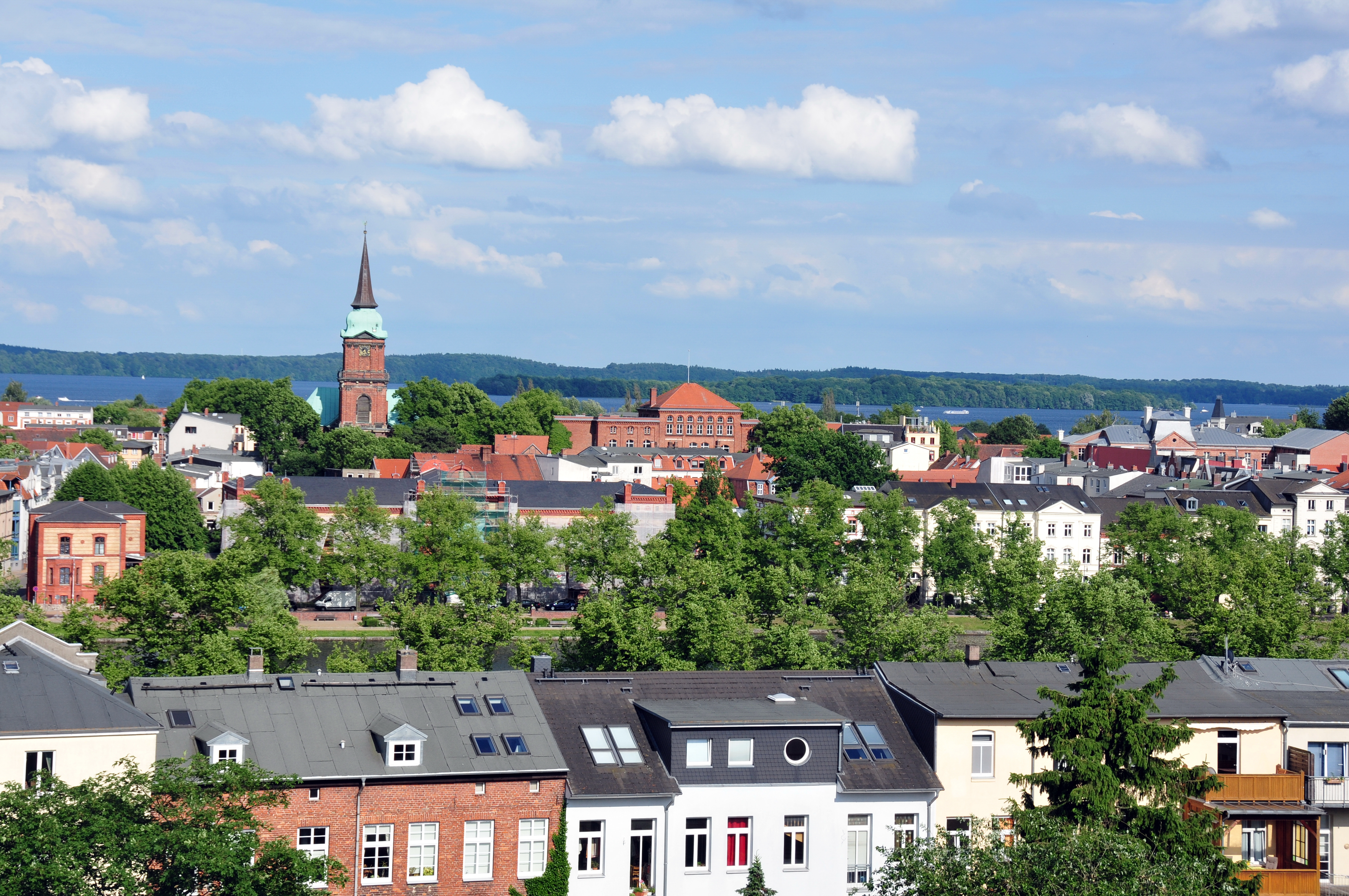
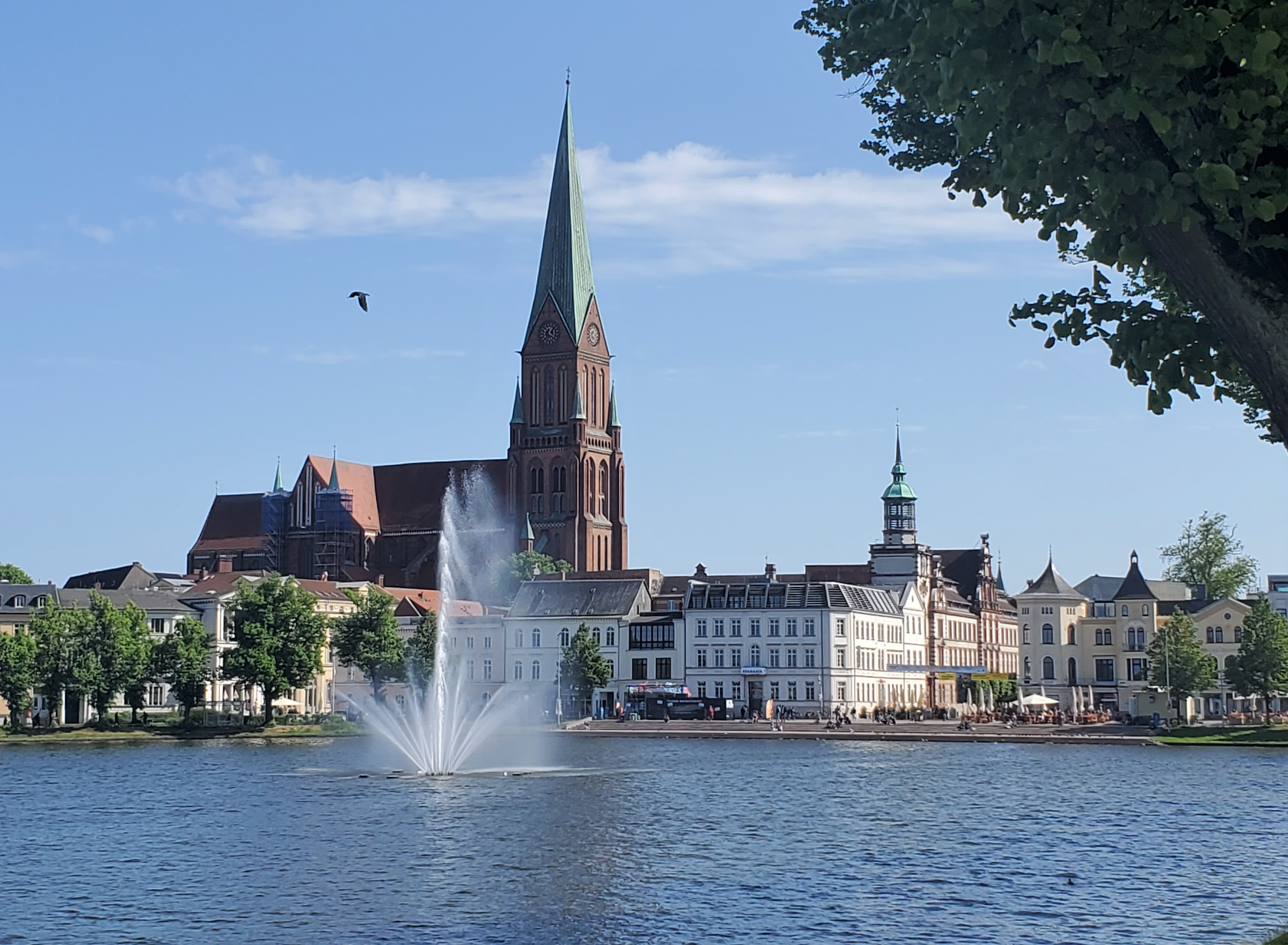
- Schwerin Castle St Paul and cathedral Orangerie Schelfstadt with Schelfkirche Pfaffenteich

- Flag Coat of arms
- Interactive map of Schwerin
- Location within Germany Location within Mecklenburg-Vorpommern
- Coordinates: 53°38′N 11°25′E
- Country: Germany
- State: Mecklenburg-Vorpommern
- District: Urban district
- Subdivisions: 18 boroughs

Government
  - Mayor (2026–30): Bernd Nottebaum (CDU)

Area
  - Total: 130.46 km^{2} (50.37 sq mi)
- Elevation: 38 m (125 ft)

Population (2025-12-31)
  - Total: 97,922
  - Density: 750.59/km^{2} (1,944.0/sq mi)
- Time zone: UTC+01:00 (CET)
  - Summer (DST): UTC+02:00 (CEST)
- Postal codes: 19053, 19055, 19057, 19059, 19061, 19063
- Dialling codes: 0385
- Vehicle registration: SN
- Website: schwerin.de

Schwerin (German: [ʃveˈʁiːn]) (Note: Mecklenburgisch-Vorpommersch Low German: Swerin; Latin: Suerina, Suerinum)) is the capital and second-largest city of the northeastern German state of Mecklenburg-Vorpommern as well as of the region of Mecklenburg, after Rostock. It has around 96,000 inhabitants, and is thus the least populous of all German state capitals.

Schwerin is located on the southwestern shore of Lake Schwerin (Schweriner See), the second-largest lake of the Mecklenburg Lake Plateau after the Müritz, and there are eleven other lakes within Schwerin's city limits. The city is surrounded by the district of Northwestern Mecklenburg to the north, and the district of Ludwigslust-Parchim to the south. Schwerin and the two surrounding districts form the eastern outskirts of the Hamburg Metropolitan Region.

Schwerin was first mentioned in 1018 as Zuarina and was granted city rights in 1160 by Henry the Lion, thus it is the oldest city of Mecklenburg-Vorpommern. As main residence of the House of Mecklenburg, a dynasty with Slavic roots also known as the Obotrites, Schwerin has served as the capital of all Mecklenburger states since the Duchy of Mecklenburg in 1379. After the abolition of states in East Germany, it served as the capital of the District of Schwerin from 1952 to 1990 and since German reunification, it has served as the capital of the (re-)founded Mecklenburg-Vorpommern.

The romantic Schwerin Palace, situated on Castle Island between Lake Schwerin and Castle Lake, known for its golden dome, the Castle Church, the throne room, and the Niklot statue; used to be the seat of the dukes and grand dukes of Mecklenburg-Schwerin, and since 1990, it has served as the seat of the state parliament of Mecklenburg-Vorpommern. Schwerin's silhouette is completed by the towers of Schwerin Cathedral, St Paul's Church and St Nicholas' Church. Because of only minor damage in World War II, the city has a largely intact building structure, both in the Altstadt (Old Town) and Schelfstadt (Reed City) quarters.

Major industries and employers include high technology, machine building, healthcare, government agencies, railway supply, consumer goods and tourism. There is a regional airport in Parchim, southeast of the city, while Hamburg Airport serves as the city's main airport.

== Geography ==
Schwerin clockwise borders the municipalities of Klein Trebbow (N), Seehof (Mecklenburg), Leezen (Mecklenburg) (lake border and border on Paul's Dam (Paulsdamm) only), Raben Steinfeld (E), Plate, Banzkow, Lübesse (S), Holthusen, Pampow, Klein Rogahn (W), Wittenförden, Brüsewitz, and Pingelshagen.

There is a small enclave between the city districts of Neumühle and Görries, belonging to the neighboring municipality of Klein Rogahn.

=== Lakes and islands ===
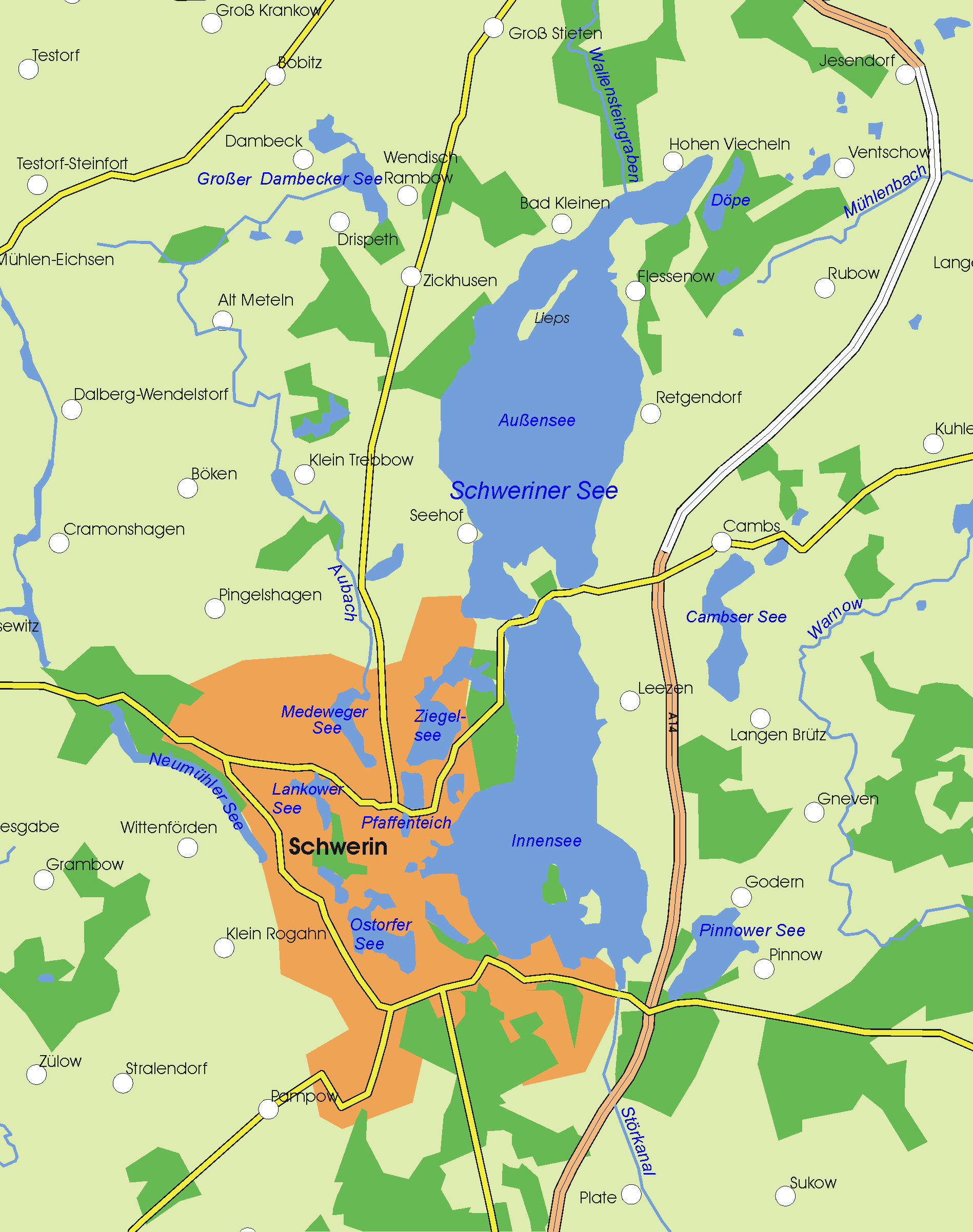
Schwerin on Lake Schwerin (Schweriner See), subdivided into Outer Lake (Außensee) and Inner Lake (Innensee) by Paul's Dam (Paulsdamm)

The 12 lakes within Schwerin's city limits:

Name	Size	Islands
Lake Schwerin; Schweriner See	61.5 km^{2} (23.7 sq mi)	Kaninchenwerder & Großer Stein, Ziegelwerder
Brick Lake; Ziegelsee	3.0 km^{2} (1.2 sq mi)	Kleine & Große Murrkiteninsel
Lake Ostorf; Ostorfer See	2.1 km^{2} (0.81 sq mi)	Toteninsel/Tannenwerder
New Mill Lake; Neumühler See	1.7 km^{2} (0.66 sq mi)	
Lake Medewege; Medeweger See	1.0 km^{2} (0.39 sq mi)	
Lake Lankow; Lankower See	0.5 km^{2} (0.19 sq mi)	Rethhorst
Foul Lake; Fauler See	0.5 km^{2} (0.19 sq mi)	
Heathens Lake; Heidensee	0.2 km^{2} (0.077 sq mi)	
Clergymen's Pond; Pfaffenteich	0.1 km^{2} (0.039 sq mi)	
Castle Lake; Burgsee	0.1 km^{2} (0.039 sq mi)	Schlossinsel
Lake Grimke; Grimkesee	0.04 km^{2} (0.015 sq mi)	
Big Karausche; Große Karausche	0.02 km^{2} (0.0077 sq mi)	

=== Boroughs ===
According to the 2024 version of the Schwerin city constitution, it is subdivided into 17 boroughs that each have a local borough council (Ortsteilvertretung). These councils have between 5 and 15 members depending on the number of inhabitants whom are picked by the city council for the duration of the municipal electoral period. The local councilors elect a borough mayor (Ortsbeiratsvorsitzender) and are to hear important matters concerning the district and have a right of initiative; final decision however rests with the city council. These 17 city boroughs are largely contiguous with the 26 city districts or quarters, several smaller districts are however grouped together in the same borough.

Boroughs and districts of Schwerin
Map
Borough	District(s)	Population (2025)		Borough mayor (2024)
Ortsteil 1	Schelfstadt	4,370	11,383	Silvia Rabethge (CDU)
Ortsteil 1	Werdervorstadt	7,013	11,383	Silvia Rabethge (CDU)
Ortsteil 1	Schelfwerder	0 (2014)	11,383	Silvia Rabethge (CDU)
Ortsteil 2	Altstadt	3,309	17,355	Stephan Haring (CDU)
Ortsteil 2	Feldstadt	3,999	17,355	Stephan Haring (CDU)
Ortsteil 2	Paulsstadt	8,368	17,355	Stephan Haring (CDU)
Ortsteil 2	Lewenberg	1,679	17,355	Stephan Haring (CDU)
Ortsteil 3	Großer Dreesch	8,447		Georg-Christian Riedel (CDU)
Ortsteil 4	Neu Zippendorf	4,966		Marco Rauch (LINKE)
Ortsteil 5	Mueßer Holz	12,353		Gret-Doris Klemkow (SPD)
Ortsteil 6	Gartenstadt	2,291	4,613	Daniel Meslien (SPD)
Ortsteil 6	Ostorf	2,322	4,613	Daniel Meslien (SPD)
Ortsteil 7	Lankow	10,086		Cordula Manow (LINKE)
Ortsteil 8	Weststadt	10,825		Thomas Munzert (CDU)
Ortsteil 9	Krebsförden	5,926		Jens Ludwig (CDU)
Ortsteil 10	Wüstmark	769	910	Solveig Dahl (UB/FDP)
Ortsteil 10	Göhrener Tannen	141	910	Solveig Dahl (UB/FDP)
Ortsteil 11	Görries	936		Ralf Klein (CDU)
Ortsteil 12	Friedrichsthal	3,945		Rolf Bemmann (SPD)
Ortsteil 13	Neumühle	3,071	3,071	Martin Frank (LINKE)
Ortsteil 13	Sacktannen	0 (2014)	3,071	Martin Frank (LINKE)
Ortsteil 14	Warnitz	1,602		Heike Ehrhardt (UB/FDP)
Ortsteil 15	Wickendorf	1,132	1,358	Annelie Schröder (SPD)
Ortsteil 15	Medewege	226	1,358	Annelie Schröder (SPD)
Ortsteil 16	Zippendorf	1,050		Thilo Kreimer (CDU)
Ortsteil 17	Mueß	894		Hasko Schubert (CDU)

=== Climate ===
Schwerin has an oceanic climate (Köppen: Cfb; Trewartha: Dobk). Schwerin is located not far from the Baltic Sea coast. Its climate is moderated by the ocean, with warm winters and cool summers throughout the year, with an average temperature ranging from 1 °C (34 °F) in winter to 18 °C (64 °F) in summer.

The Schwerin weather station has recorded the following extreme values:

- Its highest temperature was 38.4 °C (101.1 °F) on 20 July 2022.
- Its lowest temperature was −27.0 °C (−16.6 °F) on 5 February 1912.
- Its greatest annual precipitation was 850.1 mm (33.47 in) in 2002.
- Its least annual precipitation was 396.1 mm (15.59 in) in 1892.
- The longest annual sunshine was 2,040.8 hours in 1959.
- The shortest annual sunshine was 1,339.7 hours in 1926.

Climate data for Schwerin (1991–2020 normals, extremes 1890–present)
Month	Jan	Feb	Mar	Apr	May	Jun	Jul	Aug	Sep	Oct	Nov	Dec	Year
Record high °C (°F)	15.4 (59.7)	18.3 (64.9)	23.5 (74.3)	29.3 (84.7)	35.7 (96.3)	35.1 (95.2)	38.4 (101.1)	36.9 (98.4)	32.9 (91.2)	26.8 (80.2)	19.7 (67.5)	15.2 (59.4)	38.4 (101.1)
Mean maximum °C (°F)	9.9 (49.8)	11.1 (52.0)	16.3 (61.3)	22.8 (73.0)	27.2 (81.0)	29.6 (85.3)	31.1 (88.0)	31.2 (88.2)	25.7 (78.3)	20.0 (68.0)	13.7 (56.7)	10.4 (50.7)	33.1 (91.6)
Mean daily maximum °C (°F)	3.3 (37.9)	4.4 (39.9)	8.2 (46.8)	13.8 (56.8)	18.1 (64.6)	21.0 (69.8)	23.3 (73.9)	23.1 (73.6)	18.8 (65.8)	13.2 (55.8)	7.5 (45.5)	4.2 (39.6)	13.2 (55.8)
Daily mean °C (°F)	1.2 (34.2)	1.8 (35.2)	4.4 (39.9)	9.0 (48.2)	13.1 (55.6)	16.2 (61.2)	18.4 (65.1)	18.1 (64.6)	14.3 (57.7)	9.7 (49.5)	5.2 (41.4)	2.2 (36.0)	9.5 (49.1)
Mean daily minimum °C (°F)	−1.1 (30.0)	−0.9 (30.4)	1.1 (34.0)	4.4 (39.9)	8.1 (46.6)	11.4 (52.5)	13.8 (56.8)	13.7 (56.7)	10.6 (51.1)	6.6 (43.9)	2.9 (37.2)	0.1 (32.2)	5.9 (42.6)
Mean minimum °C (°F)	−9.3 (15.3)	−7.9 (17.8)	−4.2 (24.4)	−1.4 (29.5)	2.4 (36.3)	6.9 (44.4)	9.6 (49.3)	9.2 (48.6)	5.8 (42.4)	1.0 (33.8)	−3.0 (26.6)	−7.1 (19.2)	−11.6 (11.1)
Record low °C (°F)	−23.4 (−10.1)	−27.0 (−16.6)	−17.7 (0.1)	−7.4 (18.7)	−2.5 (27.5)	1.2 (34.2)	5.6 (42.1)	4.9 (40.8)	0.1 (32.2)	−4.5 (23.9)	−13.4 (7.9)	−20.9 (−5.6)	−27.0 (−16.6)
Average precipitation mm (inches)	55.6 (2.19)	42.4 (1.67)	44.0 (1.73)	35.1 (1.38)	46.7 (1.84)	59.0 (2.32)	75.4 (2.97)	67.2 (2.65)	52.2 (2.06)	51.0 (2.01)	48.3 (1.90)	56.5 (2.22)	628.5 (24.74)
Average extreme snow depth cm (inches)	5.3 (2.1)	6.5 (2.6)	3.2 (1.3)	0.7 (0.3)	0 (0)	0 (0)	0 (0)	0 (0)	0 (0)	0 (0)	1.3 (0.5)	4.0 (1.6)	11.0 (4.3)
Average precipitation days (≥ 1.0 mm)	17.4	15.1	14.5	11.8	13.1	13.6	15.2	14.8	13.6	14.7	16.3	17.7	176.9
Average snowy days (≥ 1.0 cm)	7.7	7.6	3.4	0.2	0	0	0	0	0	0	1.3	3.7	23.9
Average relative humidity (%)	87.0	83.4	78.4	71.0	70.8	71.8	72.8	74.0	78.8	84.1	88.4	88.8	79.1
Mean monthly sunshine hours	44.5	63.6	128.5	190.6	236.3	229.4	227.4	207.2	157.3	106.2	49.8	35.0	1,661
Source 1: World Meteorological Organization
Source 2: Deutscher Wetterdienst / SKlima.de

== History ==
=== Early years ===
Schwerin is enclosed by lakes. The largest of these lakes, the Schweriner See, has an area of 60 km^{2}. In the middle part of these lakes there was a settlement of the Slavic Obotrite (dated back to the 11th century). The area was called Zuarin, and the name Schwerin is derived from that designation. In 1160, Henry the Lion defeated the Obotrites and captured Schwerin. The town was later expanded into a powerful regional centre. A castle was built on this site, and expanded to become a ducal palace. It is supposedly haunted by the small, impious ghost, called Petermännchen ("Peterman").

In 1358, Schwerin became a part of the Duchy of Mecklenburg, making it the seat of the duchy from then on. About 1500, the construction of the Schwerin Palace began, as a residence for the dukes. After the division of Mecklenburg (1621), Schwerin became the capital of the Duchy of Mecklenburg-Schwerin. Between 1765 and 1837, the town of Ludwigslust served as the capital, until Schwerin was reinstated.

=== Recent times ===
In the mid-1800s, many residents from Schwerin moved to the United States, many to Milwaukee, Wisconsin. Today Milwaukee and Schwerin are sister cities. After 1918, and during the German Revolution, resulting in the fall of all the German monarchies, the Grand Duke abdicated. Schwerin became capital of the Free State of Mecklenburg-Schwerin thereafter.

During World War II, Schwerin was hit by bombs on four occasions during the bombing of Schwerin. The first attack took place in July 1940, causing only minor damage. After nearly 5 years of no attacks, the biggest air raid happened on 7 April 1945. 1500 bombs were dropped on the city after missing its intended target, the freight station, killing 224 people and destroying 42 houses. A third attack happened on 19 April 1945. Ultimately, 3% of the city ended up being destroyed due to the aerial attacks. At the end of World War II, on 2 May 1945, Schwerin was taken by United States troops. It was turned over to the British on 1 June 1945, and one month later, on 1 July 1945, it was handed over to the Soviet forces, as the British and American forces pulled back from the line of contact to the predesignated occupation zones.

Schwerin was then in the Soviet Occupation Zone which was to become the German Democratic Republic (GDR). Upon entering of Soviet forces, accounts of rape were reported by multiple inhabitants of the city.

Initially, it was the capital of the State of Mecklenburg which at that time included the western part of Pomerania (Vorpommern). After the states were dissolved in the GDR, in 1952, Schwerin served as the capital of the Schwerin district (Bezirk Schwerin).

After reunification in 1990, the former state of Mecklenburg-Vorpommern was recreated as one of the Bundesländer. Rostock was a serious contender for state capital but the decision went in favour of Schwerin.

== Demographics ==
Population of Schwerin between 1200 and 2022

As of the 2022 German census, Schwerin has a population of 96,447, which makes it the smallest state capital in all of Germany. As of the end of 2025, Schwerin reported to have a population of 99,721, while showing signs of growth, making it possible that Schwerin could reclaim its status as a major city (Großstadt, meaning above 100,000 inhabitants) in the near future. Schwerin had previously held this status between 1972 and 2000. The 2025 estimate is divided between 51,811 (51.96%) female and 47,910 (48.04%) male.

Historical population

Year	Pop.	±%
1160	500	—
1500	2,500	+400.0%
1553	2,700	+8.0%
1590	956	−64.6%
1694	1,500	+56.9%
1764	3,288	+119.2%
1790	3,512	+6.8%
1819	5,854	+66.7%
1830	12,915	+120.6%
1837	14,916	+15.5%
1839	16,063	+7.7%
1840	16,648	+3.6%
1842	17,336	+4.1%
1848	19,422	+12.0%
1850	16,731	−13.9%
1860	23,517	+40.6%
1868	24,210	+2.9%
1875	27,643	+14.2%
1880	30,146	+9.1%
1885	31,528	+4.6%
1890	33,643	+6.7%
1900	38,667	+14.9%
1910	42,519	+10.0%
1925	48,157	+13.3%

Year	Pop.	±%
1933	53,621	+11.3%
1939	60,938	+13.6%
1940	67,200	+10.3%
1950	93,576	+39.3%
1955	94,171	+0.6%
1956	93,305	−0.9%
1957	92,481	−0.9%
1958	92,011	−0.5%
1959	92,195	+0.2%
1960	92,508	+0.3%
1961	92,902	+0.4%
1962	93,830	+1.0%
1963	94,786	+1.0%
1964	91,164	−3.8%
1965	92,356	+1.3%
1966	92,674	+0.3%
1967	93,091	+0.4%
1968	93,775	+0.7%
1969	95,277	+1.6%
1970	97,389	+2.2%
1971	98,857	+1.5%
1972	100,888	+2.1%
1973	102,897	+2.0%
1974	104,984	+2.0%

Year	Pop.	±%
1975	107,374	+2.3%
1976	110,051	+2.5%
1977	113,038	+2.7%
1978	115,950	+2.6%
1979	118,868	+2.5%
1980	121,175	+1.9%
1981	122,264	+0.9%
1982	123,425	+0.9%
1983	124,975	+1.3%
1984	126,390	+1.1%
1985	127,538	+0.9%
1986	128,328	+0.6%
1987	129,475	+0.9%
1988	130,685	+0.9%
1989	129,227	−1.1%
1990	127,447	−1.4%
1996	111,029	−12.9%
1997	107,667	−3.0%
1998	105,213	−2.3%
1999	102,878	−2.2%
2000	101,267	−1.6%
2001	99,978	−1.3%
2002	98,742	−1.2%
2003	97,694	−1.1%

Year	Pop.	±%
2004	97,110	−0.6%
2005	96,656	−0.5%
2006	96,280	−0.4%
2007	95,855	−0.4%
2008	95,551	−0.3%
2009	95,041	−0.5%
2010	95,220	+0.2%
2011	91,327	−4.1%
2012	91,264	−0.1%
2013	91,583	+0.3%
2014	92,138	+0.6%
2015	96,800	+5.1%
2016	95,668	−1.2%
2017	95,797	+0.1%
2018	95,818	+0.0%
2019	95,653	−0.2%
2020	95,609	−0.0%
2021	95,740	+0.1%
2022	96,447	+0.7%
2024	98,308	+1.9%
2025	99,721	+1.4%

Data may be effected by territorial fluctuation.
Sources: 1160, 1500–1868, 1875–1950, 1955–1990, 1990, 1996–2024, 2022, 2025

=== Crime rate ===
According to the official 2007 Crime Report for Germany, Schwerin was the only German city with a crime rate over 17,000 total offenses committed per 100,000 inhabitants; thus being 1st in the list of Germany's most dangerous cities. The larger cities, such as Berlin, Frankfurt am Main, or Bremen, all have crime rates ranging from 14,000 to 16,000 total offenses committed per 100,000 people. However, Schwerin is the only city where riding a bus (or tram) without a ticket and social security fraud is counted towards the crime rate, significantly boosting the numbers.

== Politics ==
=== City council ===
The most recent city council election was held on 9 June 2024, and the results were as follows:

Total 45 seats
- Left: 5
- PARTEI: 1
- Greens: 3
- ASK: 1
- SPD: 8
- Ind.: 1
- FDP: 2
- UB: 3
- CDU: 9
- AfD: 12

Party	Votes	%	±	Seats	±
Alternative for Germany (AfD)	38,352	26.0	▲10.9	12	▲5
Christian Democratic Union (CDU)	29,051	19.7	▲2.5	9	▲1
Social Democratic Party (SPD)	24,749	16.8	▼0.4	8	0
The Left (Die Linke)	15,113	10.2	▼5.3	5	▼2
Independent Citizens (UB)	10,617	7.2	▼6.9	3	▼3
Alliance 90/The Greens (Grüne)	10,088	6.8	▼5.3	3	▼2
Free Democratic Party (FDP)	5,388	3.7	▼0.3	2	0
Die PARTEI (PARTEI)	4,876	3.3	▲0.3	1	0
Independent Steinmüller	3,480	2.4	New	1	New
Ask Group – City and Culture Protection (ASK)	3,181	2.2	▲0.7	1	0
Independent Mittelstädt	436	0.3	New	0	New
K-I	402	0.3	New	0	New
Independent Szymik	402	0.3	New	0	New
Valid votes	147,473	100.0			
Invalid ballots	2,109	1.4			
Total ballots	50,842	100.0		45	±0
Electorate/voter turnout	78,517	64.8	▲6.8		
Source: City of Schwerin

=== Mayor ===
The current mayor of Schwerin is Bernd Nottebaum (CDU) since 2026.

The most recent mayoral election was held on 4 June 2023, with a runoff held on 18 June, and the results were as follows:

Candidate	Party	First round		Second round	
Candidate	Party	Votes	%	Votes	%
Rico Badenschier	Social Democratic Party	16,510	42.0	26,078	67.8
Leif-Erik Holm	Alternative for Germany	10,792	27.4	12,360	32.2
Thomas Tweer	Independent (CDU/FDP/UB)	6,714	17.1		
Daniel Trepsdorf	The Left	3,506	8.9		
Regina Dorfmann	Alliance 90/The Greens	1,088	2.8		
Martin Steinitz	ASK	737	1.9		
Valid votes		39,347	99.6	38,438	99.4
Invalid votes		161	0.4	225	0.6
Total		39,508	100.0	38,663	100.0
Electorate/voter turnout		78,545	50.3	78,390	49.3
Source: City of Schwerin (1st round, 2nd round)

==== List of mayors ====
Before 1919, Schwerin had two dual-mayors. The following is a list of all mayors since 1800:

- 1800–1843: Rudolf Christian Heinrich Kahle (Ind.)
- 1843–1848: Ernst Julius Gottlieb Bernien (Ind.)
- 1848–1858: Friedrich Strempel (Ind.)
- 1858–1866: August Moeller (NLP)
- 1866–1883: Carl Pohle (Left)
- 1883–1911: Karl Tackert (Ind.)
- 1898–1918: Max Burgmann (Ind.)
- 1918–1926: Ernst Wempe (Ind.)
- 1926–1933: Joachim Saschenbrecker (Ind.)
- 1933–1937: Ernst Wempe (NSDAP)
- 1937–1940: Wilhelm Timmermann (NSDAP)
- 1940–1942: Ernst Barten (NSDAP; acting)
- 1942–1945: Richard Crull (NSDAP)
- May 1945: Jürgen Berlin (NSDAP)
- May–Aug 1945: Heinz Maus (Ind.)
- Aug–Nov 1945: Erich Wiesner (KPD)
- 1945–1949: Christoph Seitz (KPD)
- 1950–1953: Johanna Blecha (SED)
- 1953–1961: Gustav Schwantz (SED)
- 1961–1969: Günter Braun (SED)
- 1969–1971: Franz Schönbeck (SED)
- 1971–1977: Horst Pietsch (SED)
- 1977–1984: Dr. Frank Grimm (SED)
- 1984–1990: Dr. Helmut Oder (SED)
- 1990–2002: Johannes Kwaschik
- 2002–2008: Norbert Claussen (CDU)
- May–Oct 2008: Wolfram Friedersdorff (LINKE; acting)
- 2008–2016: Angelika Gramkow (LINKE)
- 2016–2025: Dr. Rico Badenschier (SPD)
- since 2026: Bernd Nottebaum (CDU; acting)
- 1803–1819: Johann Hermann Kuetemeyer (Ind.)
- 1820–1833: Johann Gottlieb Büsing (Ind.)
- 1832–1852: Theodor Floerke (Ind.)
- 1852–1855: Johann Andreas Christian Kühm (Ind.)
- 1855–1870: Karl Julius Gottfried Juhr (Ind.)
- 1870–1879: Karl Christian Heinrich Westphal (Ind.)
- 1879–1898: Heinrich Bade (Ind.)
- 1911–1919: Karl Prehn (Ind.)

== Infrastructure ==
=== Transport ===
City buses and trams are run by NVS (Nahverkehr Schwerin).

Schwerin Hauptbahnhof (central station) is connected by rail to Berlin, Hamburg and Rostock.

The nearest airport is Hamburg Airport, which is located 116 km (72 mi) west of Schwerin.

=== Education ===
Schwerin has two academic colleges, the Schwerin campus of the "Fachhochschule des Mittelstands" (University of Applied Sciences of the Mittelstand), and the Schwerin campus of the "Hochschule der Bundesagentur für Arbeit" (University of the Federal Employment Agency). Schwerin is also the only state capital that has no universities.

== Sights ==
Schwerin Residence Ensemble
UNESCO World Heritage Site
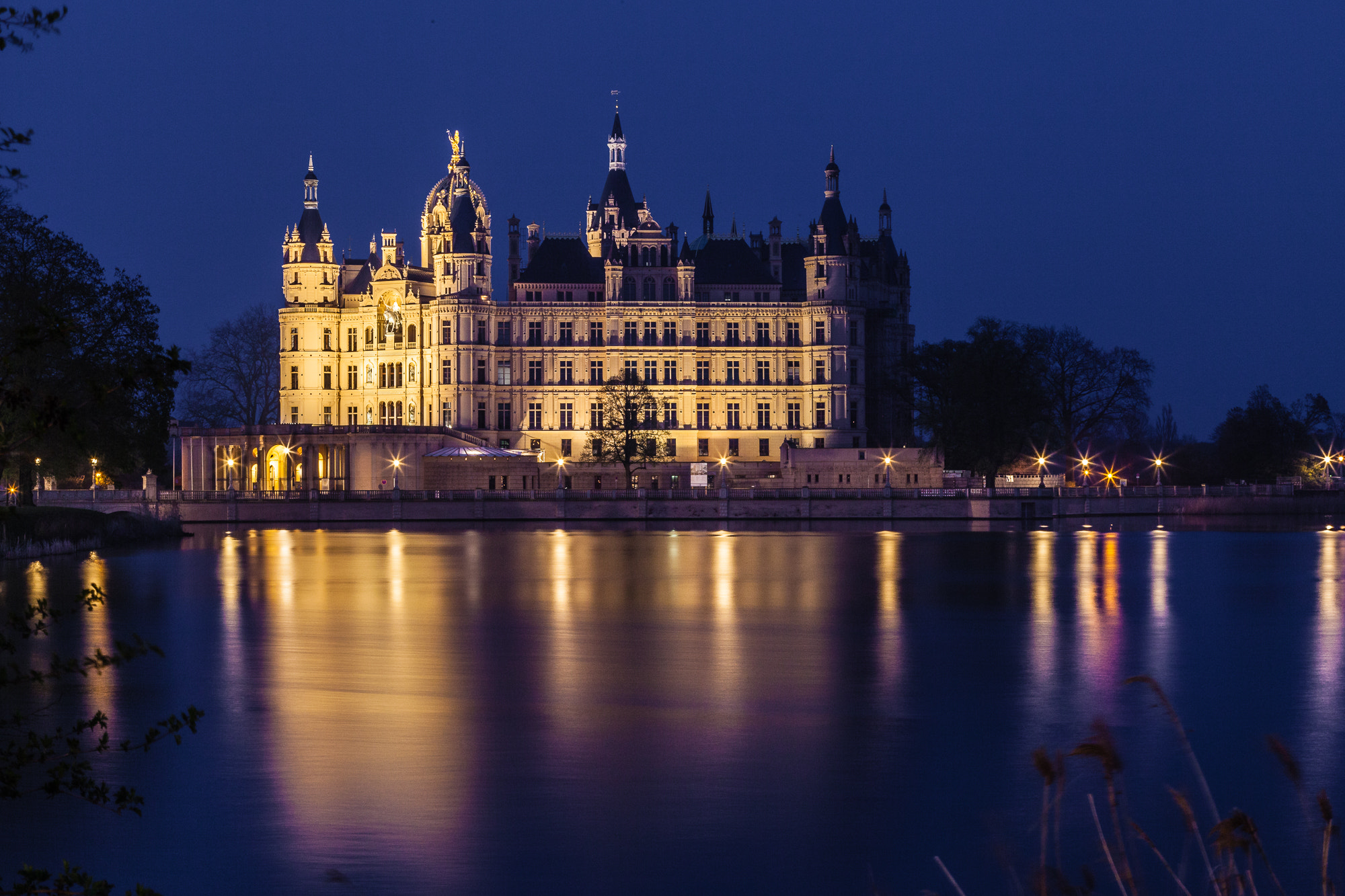
- Schwerin Castle
- Interactive map of Schwerin Residence Ensemble
- Criteria: Cultural: iv
- Reference: 1705
- Inscription: 2024 (46th Session)
- Area: 2,275.77 ha
- Buffer zone: 2,691.95 ha
- Website: https://de.wikipedia.org/wiki/Residenzensemble_Schwerin

- The landmark of the city is the Schwerin Palace, located on an island in the lake of the same name (Schweriner See). It was, for centuries, the residence of the Dukes of Mecklenburg and today is the seat of the Landtag (state parliament).
- Schwerin Cathedral, built in 1260–1416 in Brick Gothic style.
- The Alter Garten (Old Garden) square, surrounded by buildings such as the 18th-century Altes Palais (Old Palace), the neoclassical Staatliches Museum Schwerin (State Art Museum, built in 1877–1882), and the Staatstheater (City Theater, erected in 1886).
- The city hall (18th century).
- Schelfkirche (Saint Nicolai Church), originally built 1238, but rebuilt in 1713 after destruction by a storm.
- TV Tower Schwerin-Zippendorf.

=== Museums ===
- The Staatliches Museum Schwerin-Kunstsammlungen (State Art Museum) houses a remarkable collection of 17th-century Dutch paintings and German art from medieval and renaissance masters up to the present day. There are also a collection of Greek vases, the notable collection of Paintings of Jean-Baptiste Oudry, a collection of sculptures of Houdon, German 18th-century court paintings, and works by such modern artists as Max Liebermann, Franz Stuck, Marcel Duchamp etc. The Graphic cabinet houses rich collections of Dutch and German drawings and prints (Jan van Goyen, Dürer, Cranach, Rembrandt, Merian) and a notable collection of coloured graphics from the time of the GDR.
- The State Museum of Technology (Technische Museum), housed in the former Marstall (Royal Stables). In 2012 the Technische Museum moved to the city of Wismar located 40 km north of Schwerin.

== Gallery ==
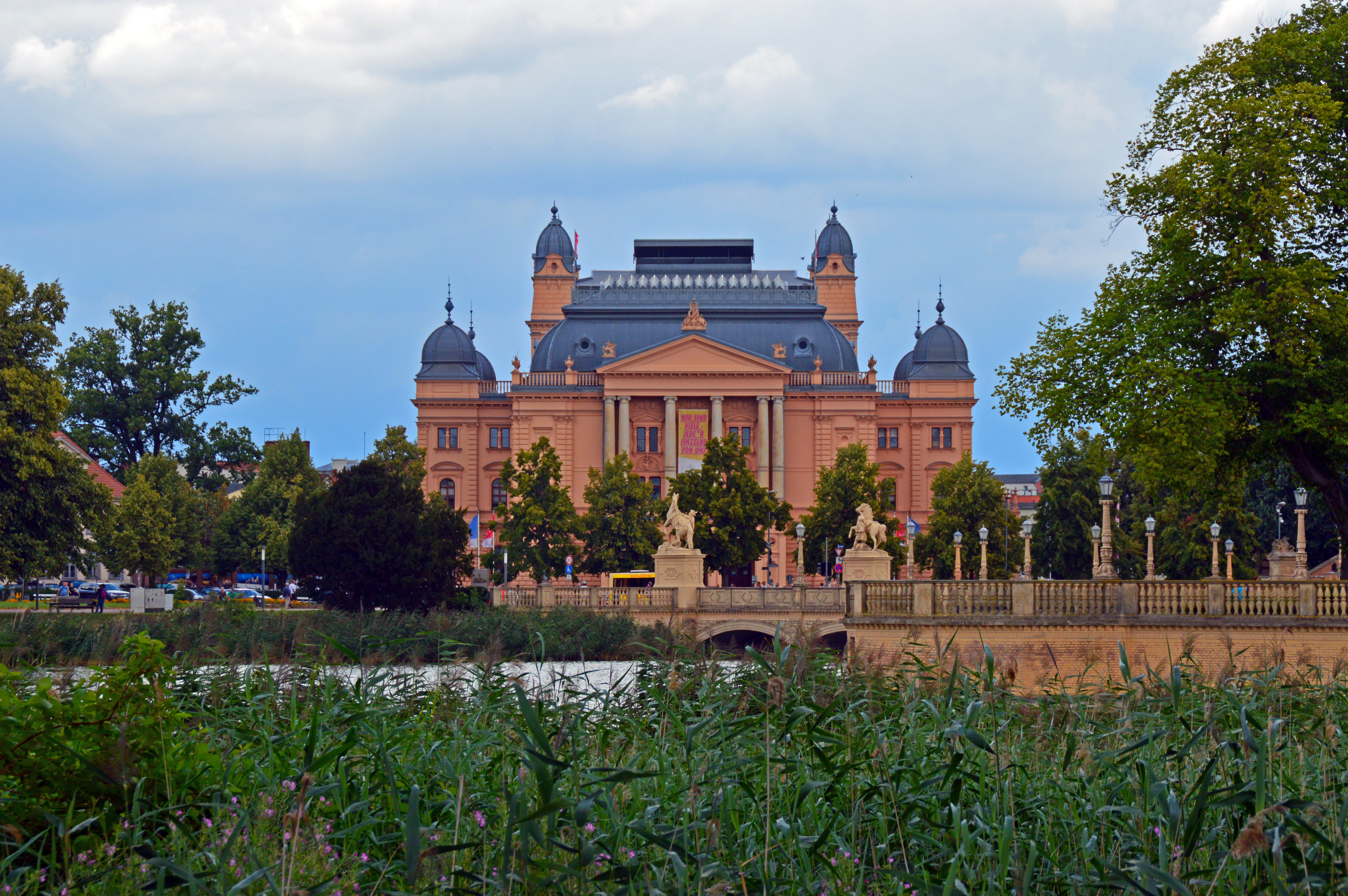
Mecklenburg State Theatre

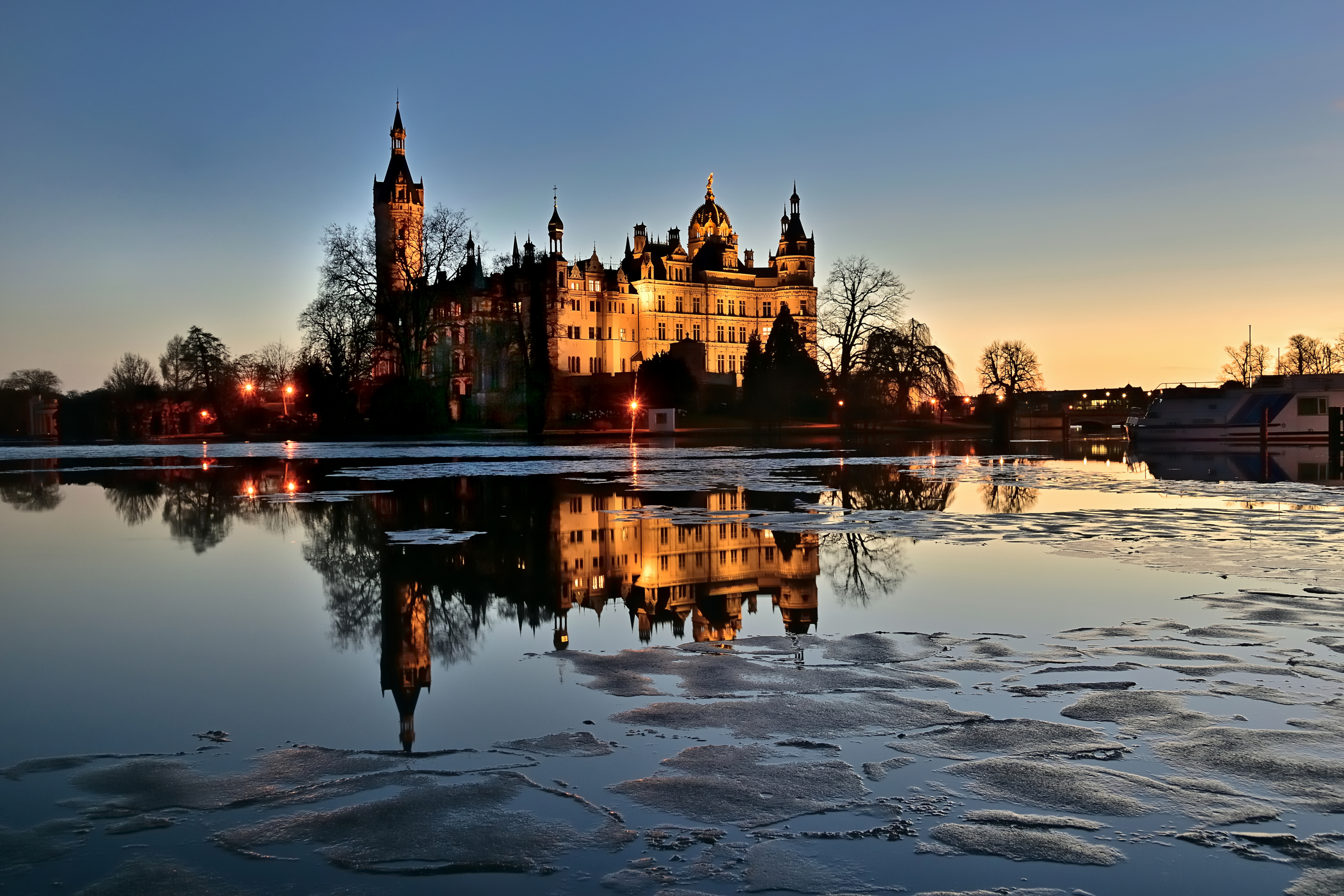
Castle of Schwerin in the evening

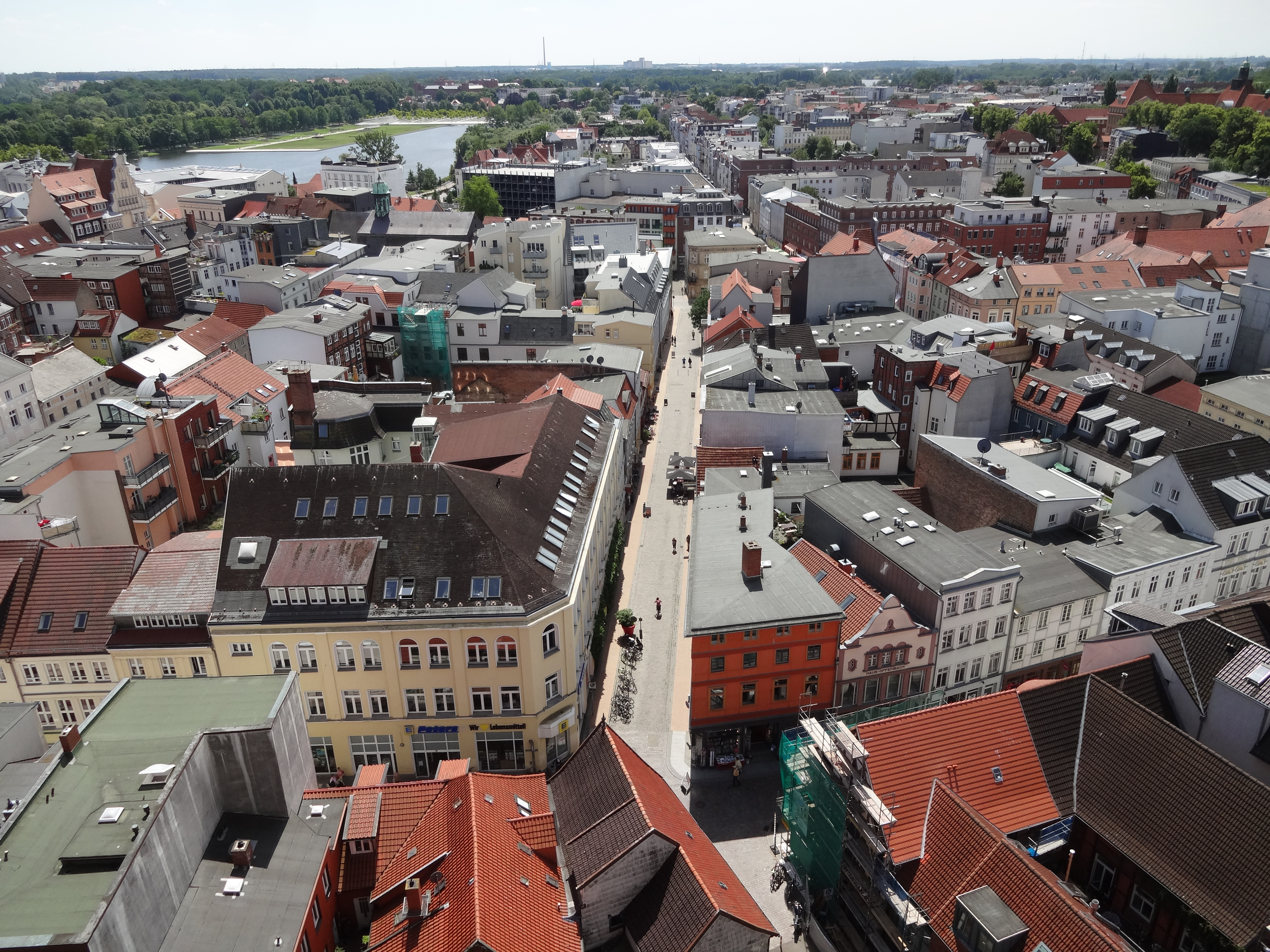
View of the old town

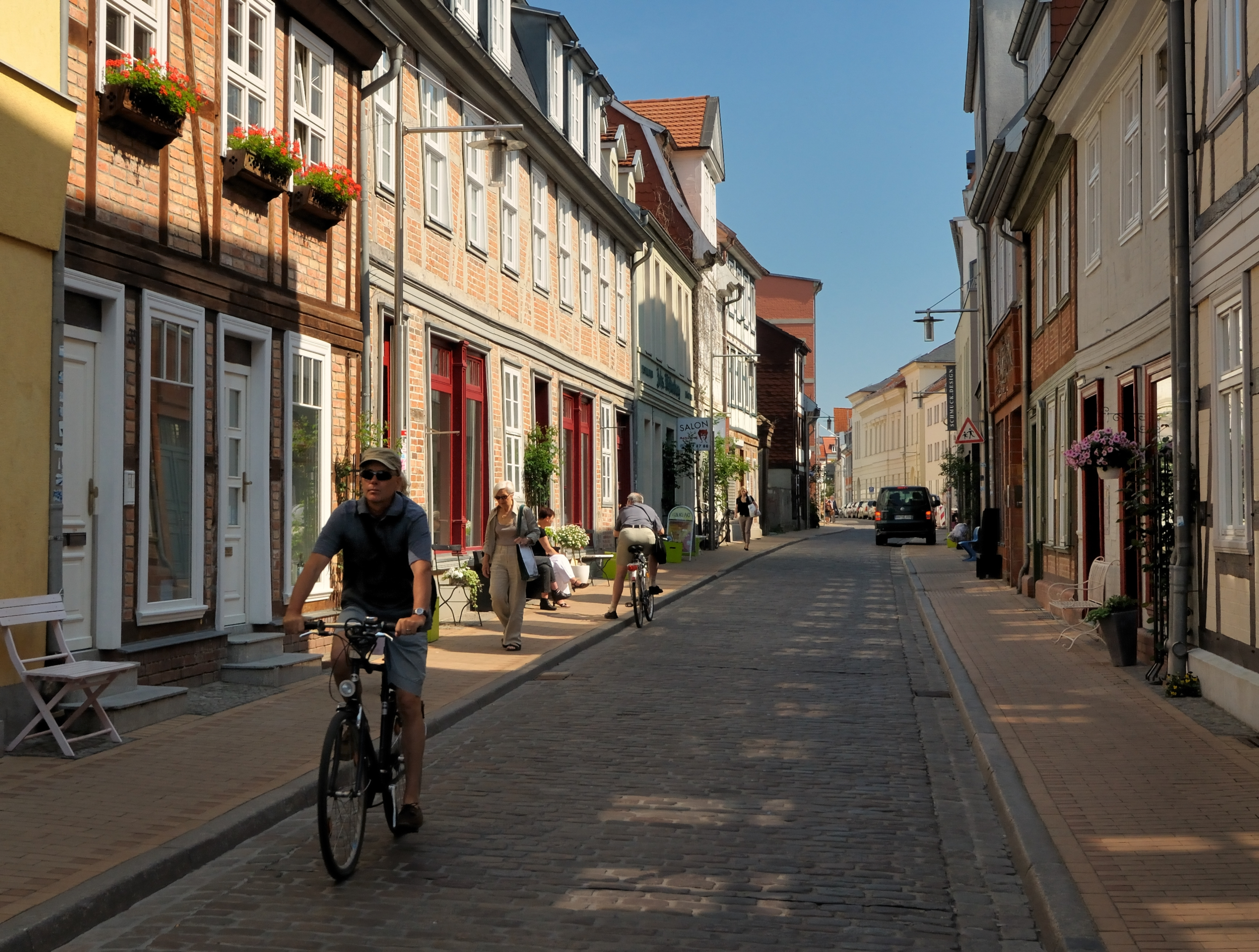
Schelfstadt

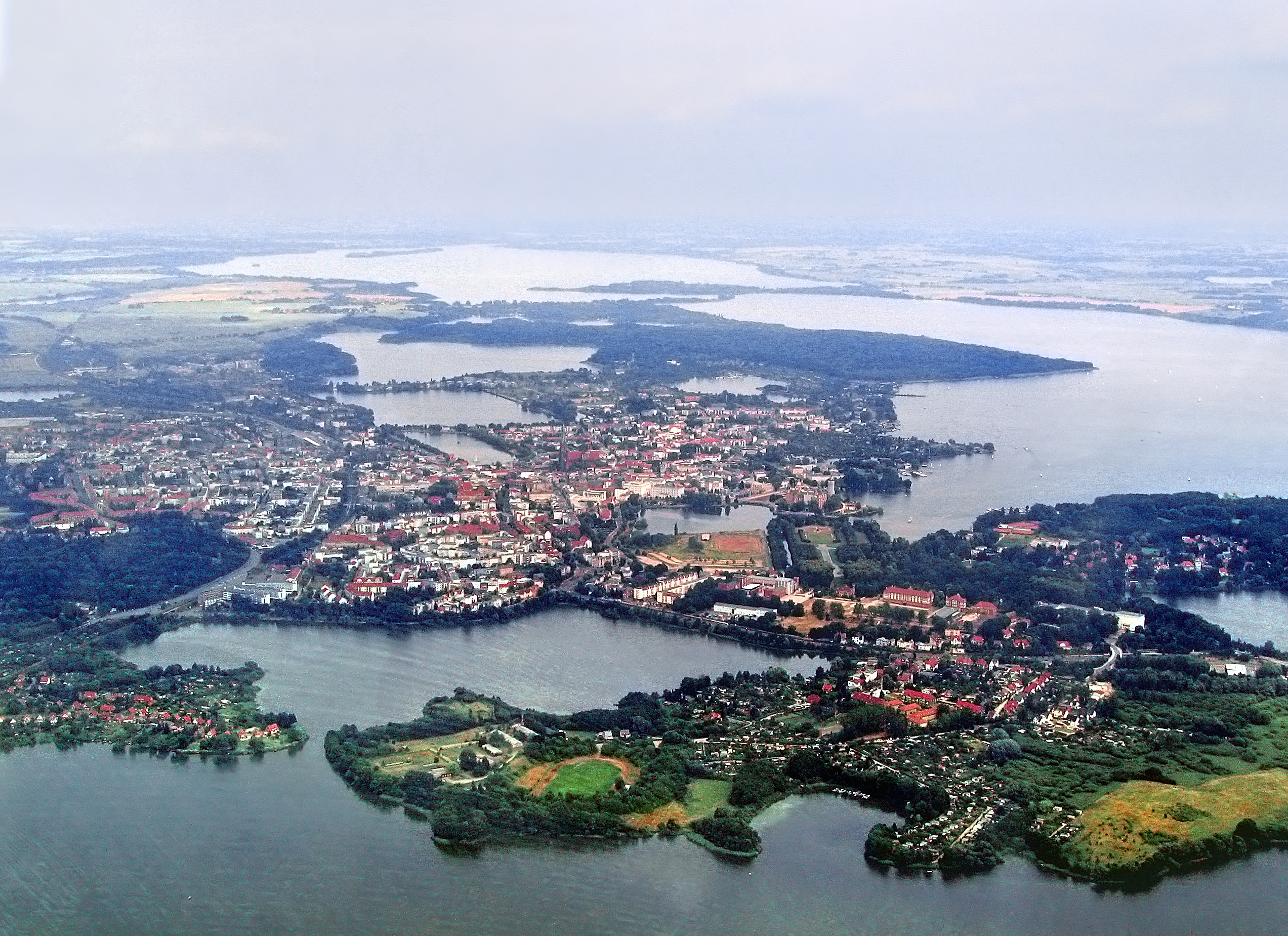
Aerial view of Schwerin

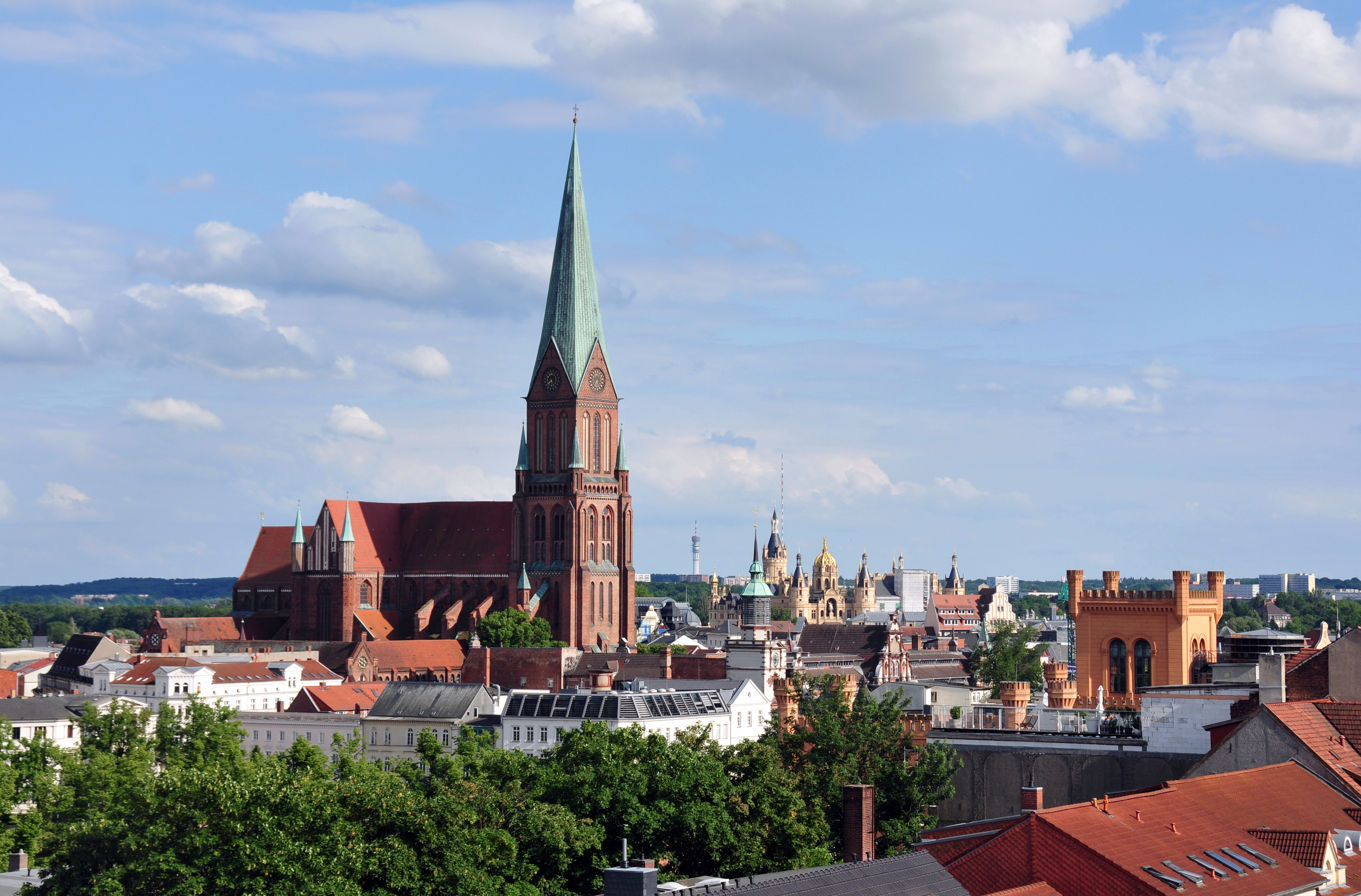
Schwerin Cathedral in the city centre

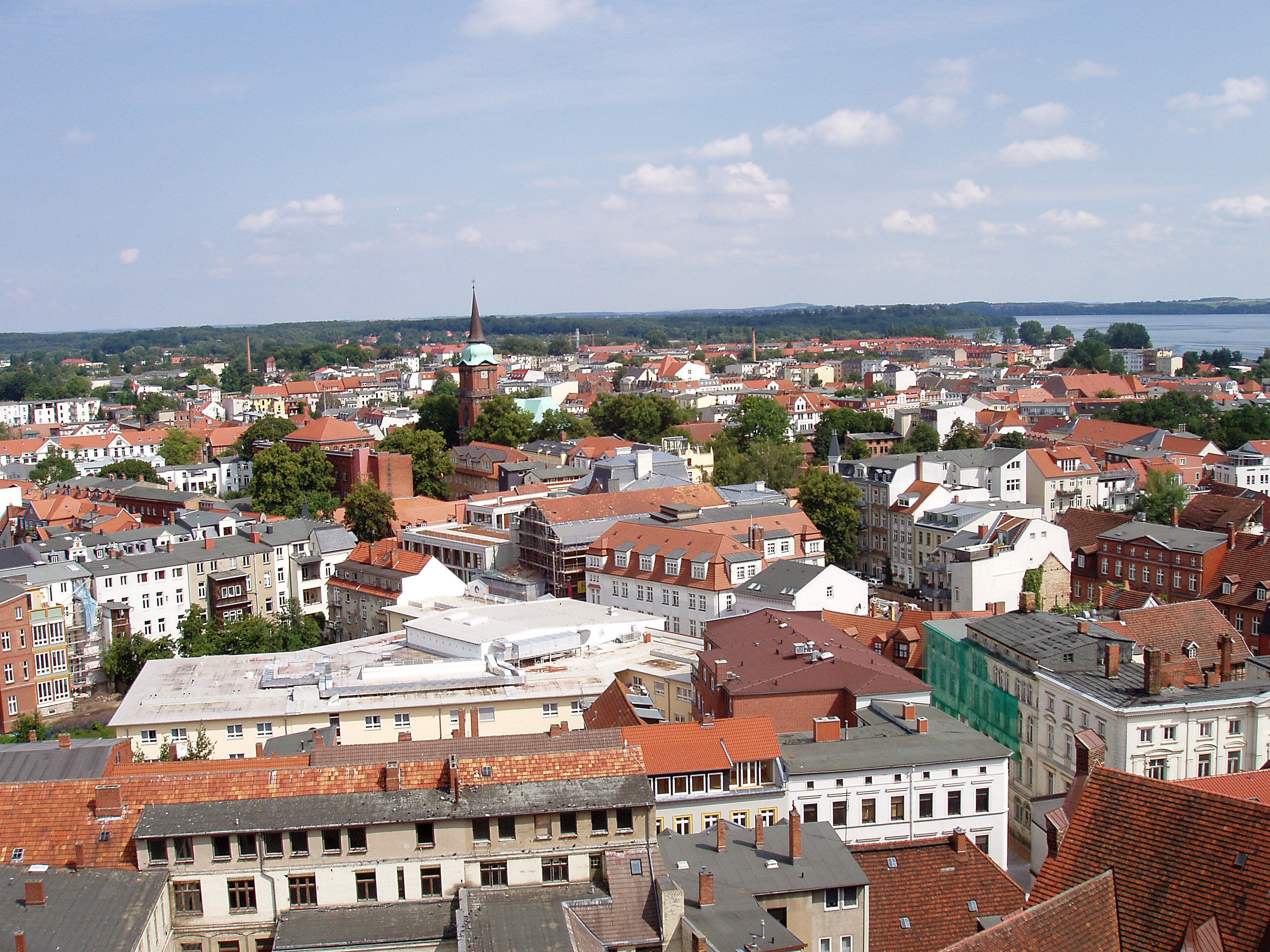
Schelfstadt and its baroque Schelf Church, Lake Schwerin in the back

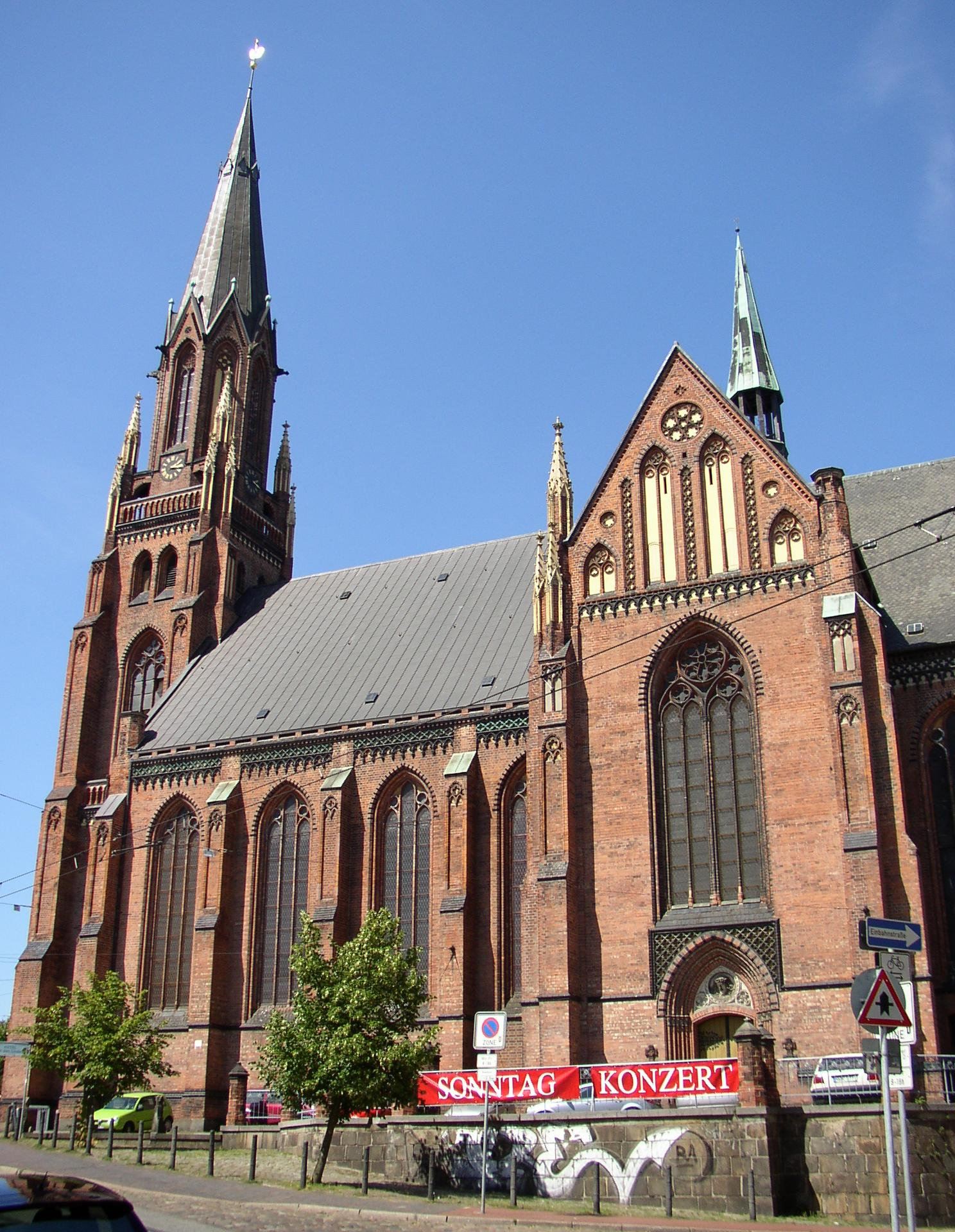
Saint Paul's Church

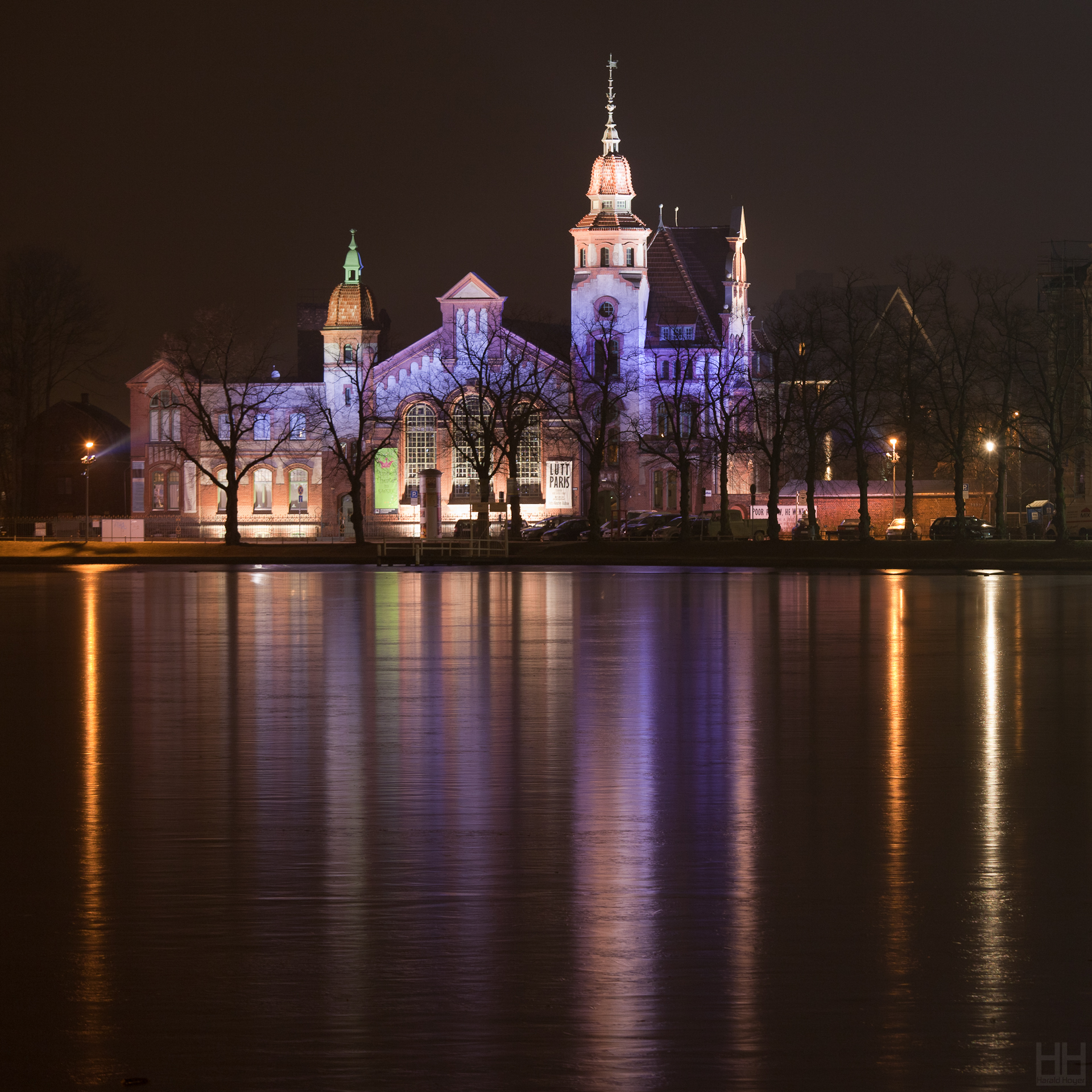
Former power station (E-Werk)

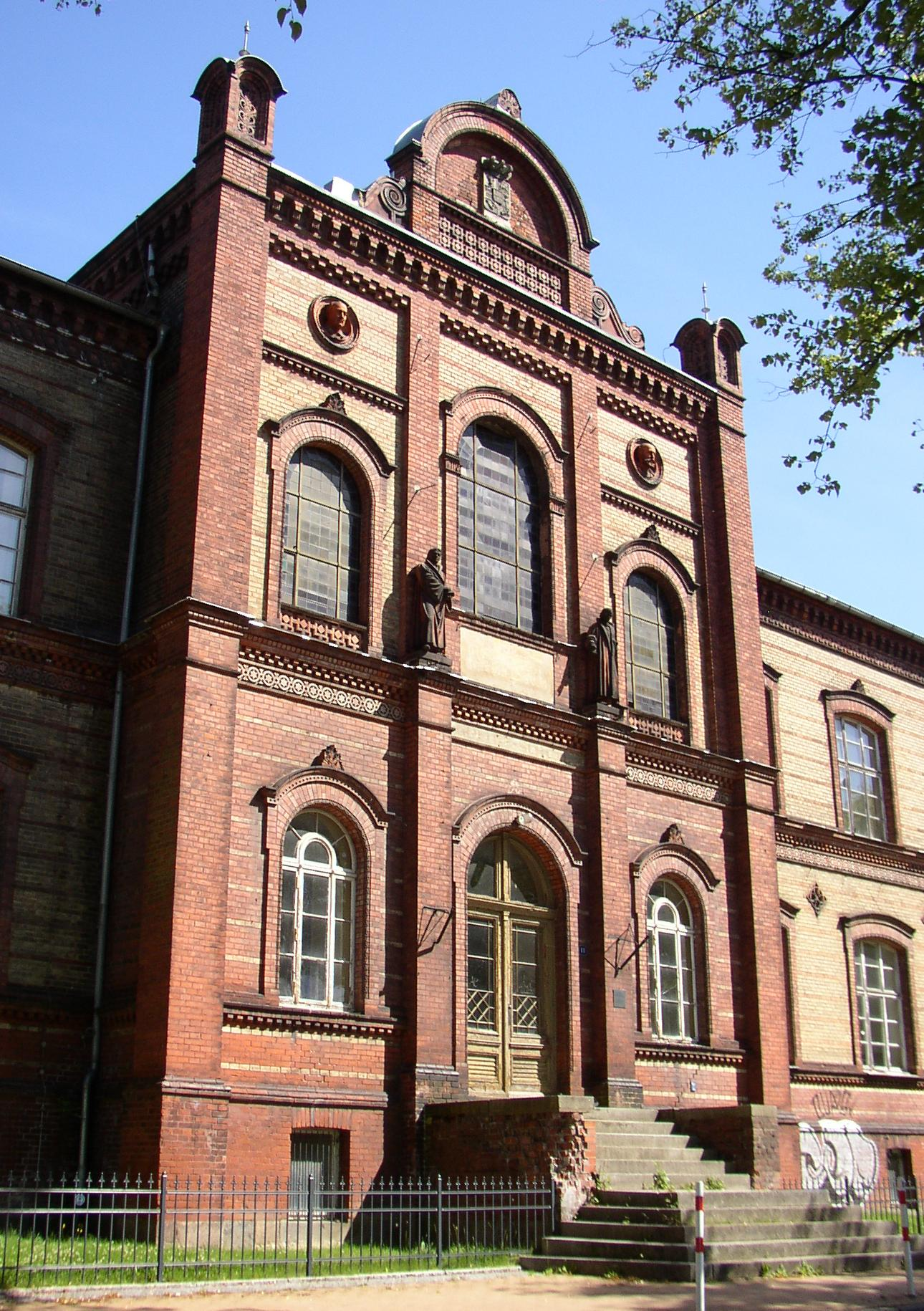
FHM, private university

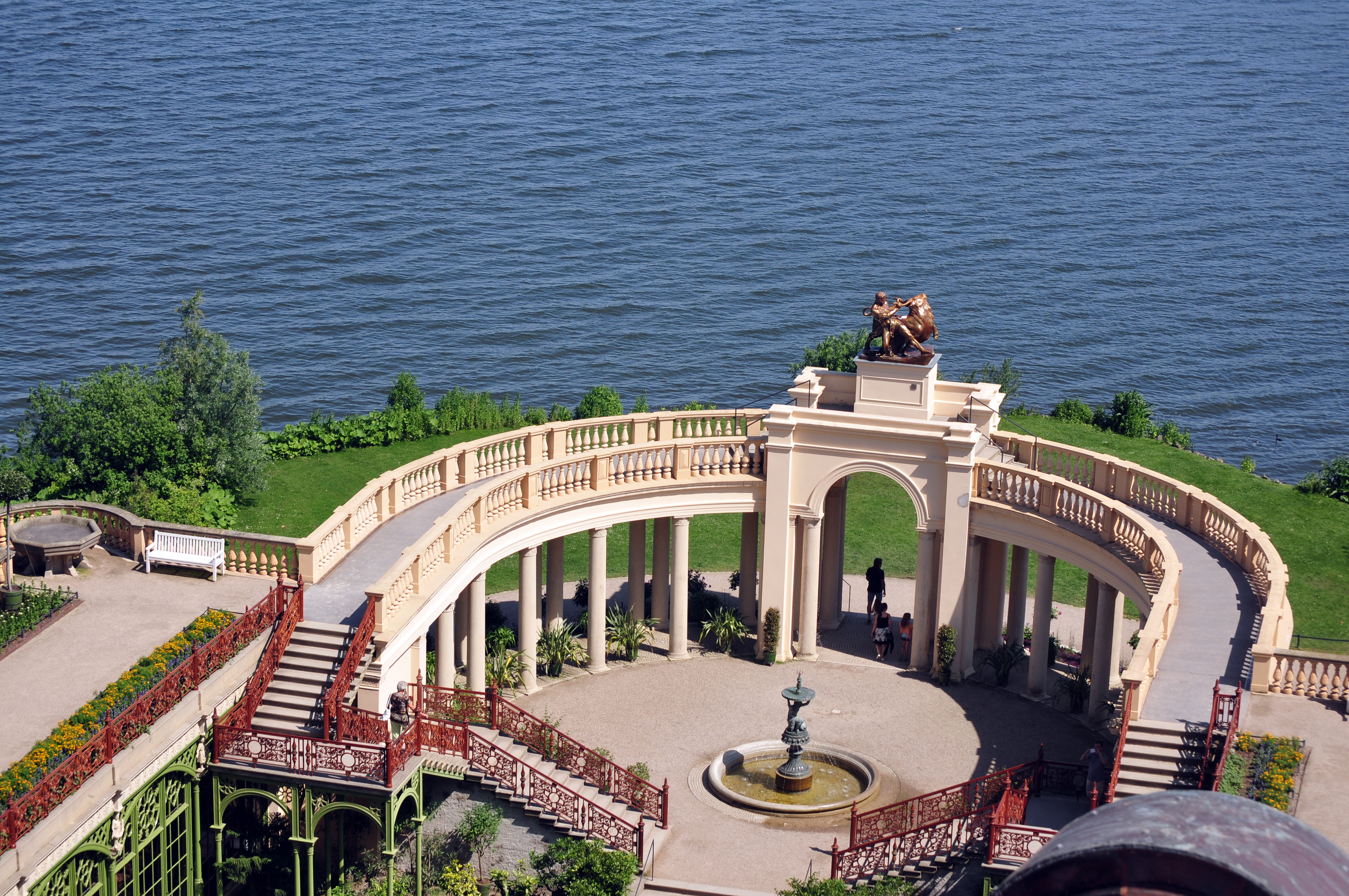
Castle orangerie

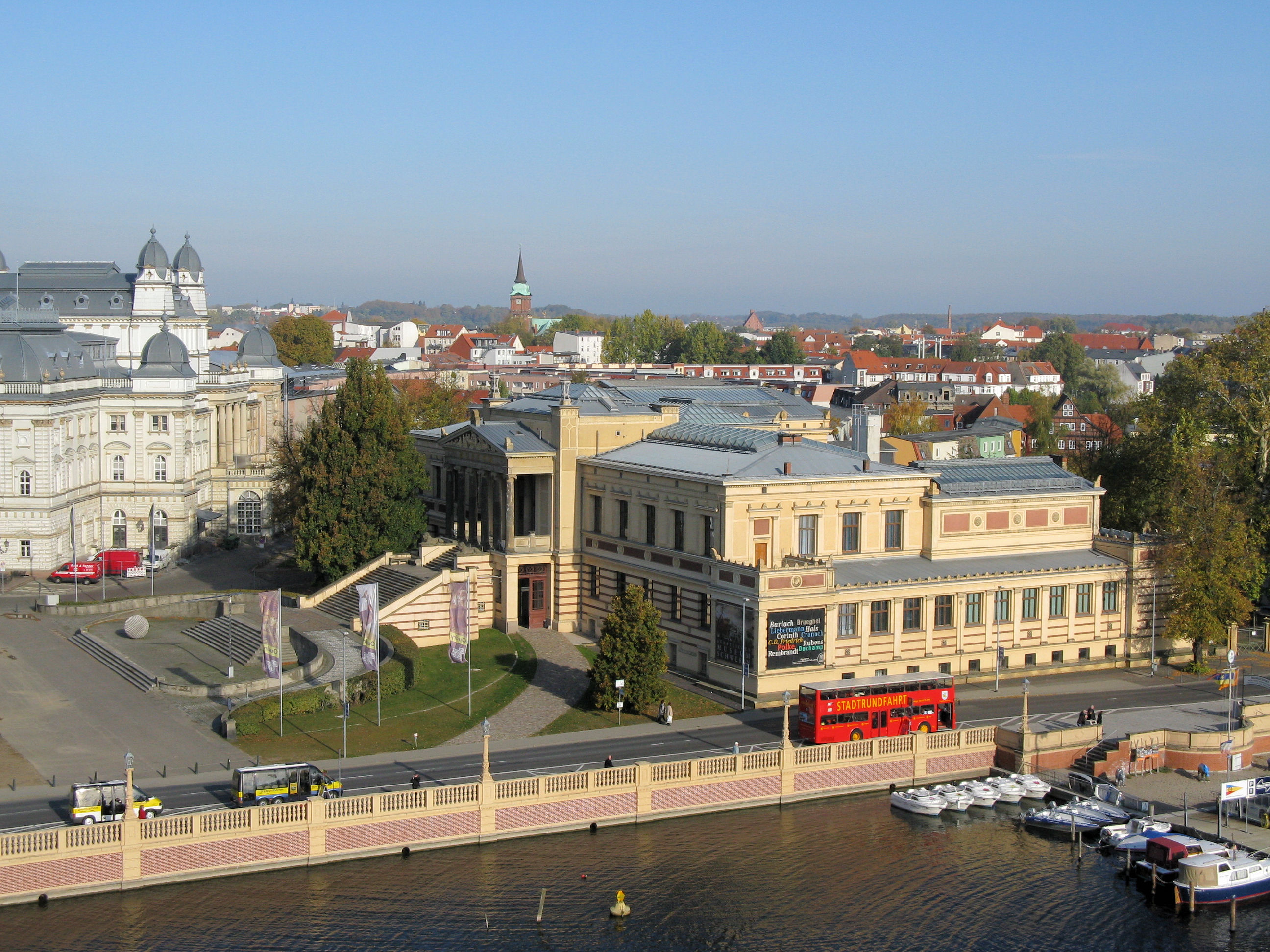
State Museum and Mecklenburg State Theatre

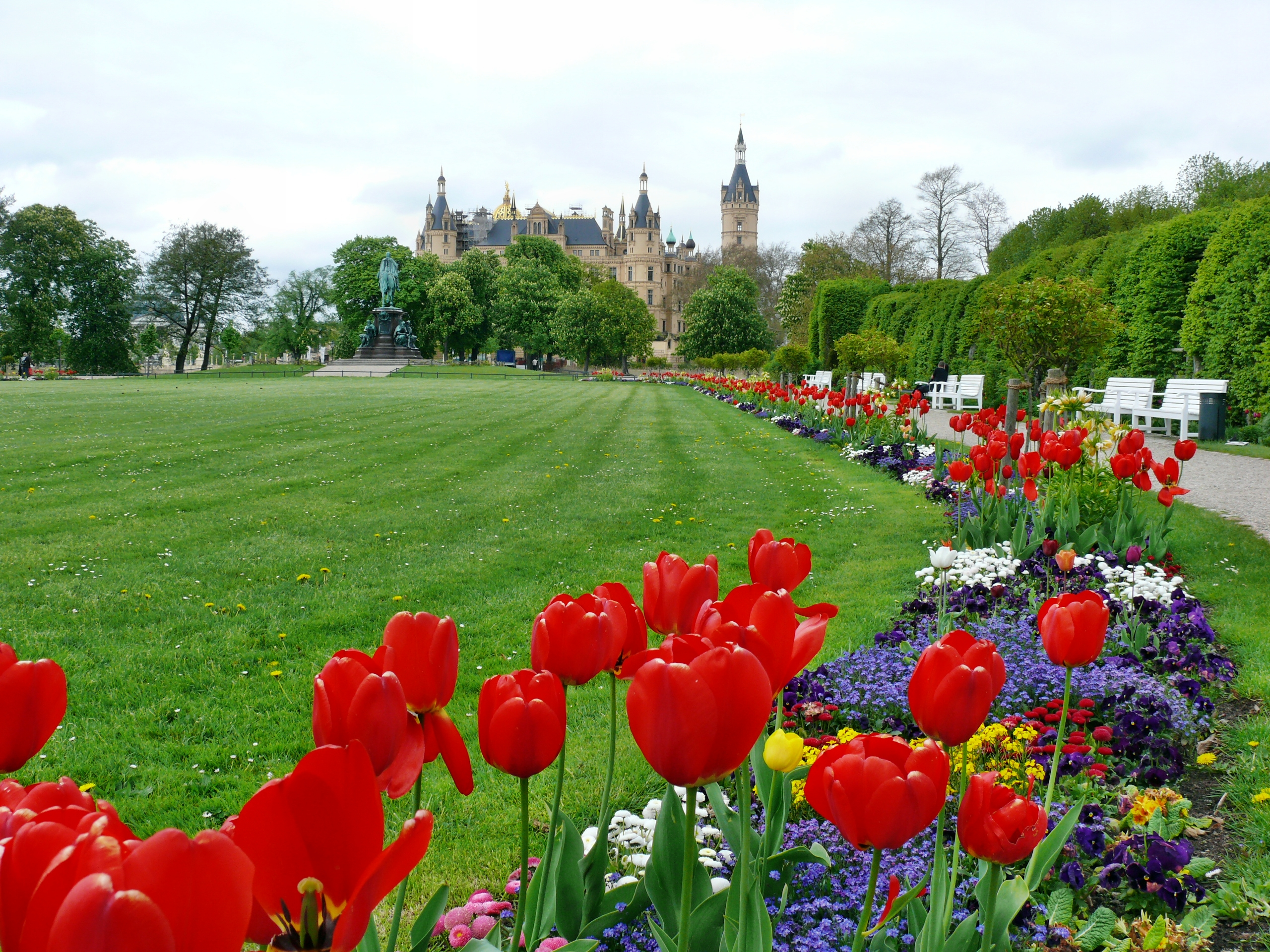
Schlossgarten

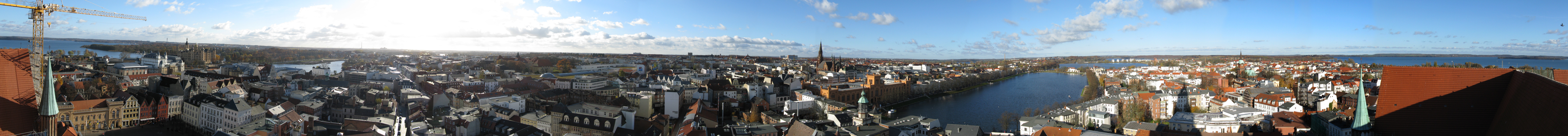
Panoramic view of Schwerin's historic city centre

== Twin towns – sister cities ==
Schwerin is twinned with:

- Odense, Denmark
- Piła, Poland
- Reggio Emilia, Italy
- Tallinn, Estonia
- Vaasa, Finland
- Växjö, Sweden
- Wuppertal, Germany

== Notable people ==
=== Aristocracy ===
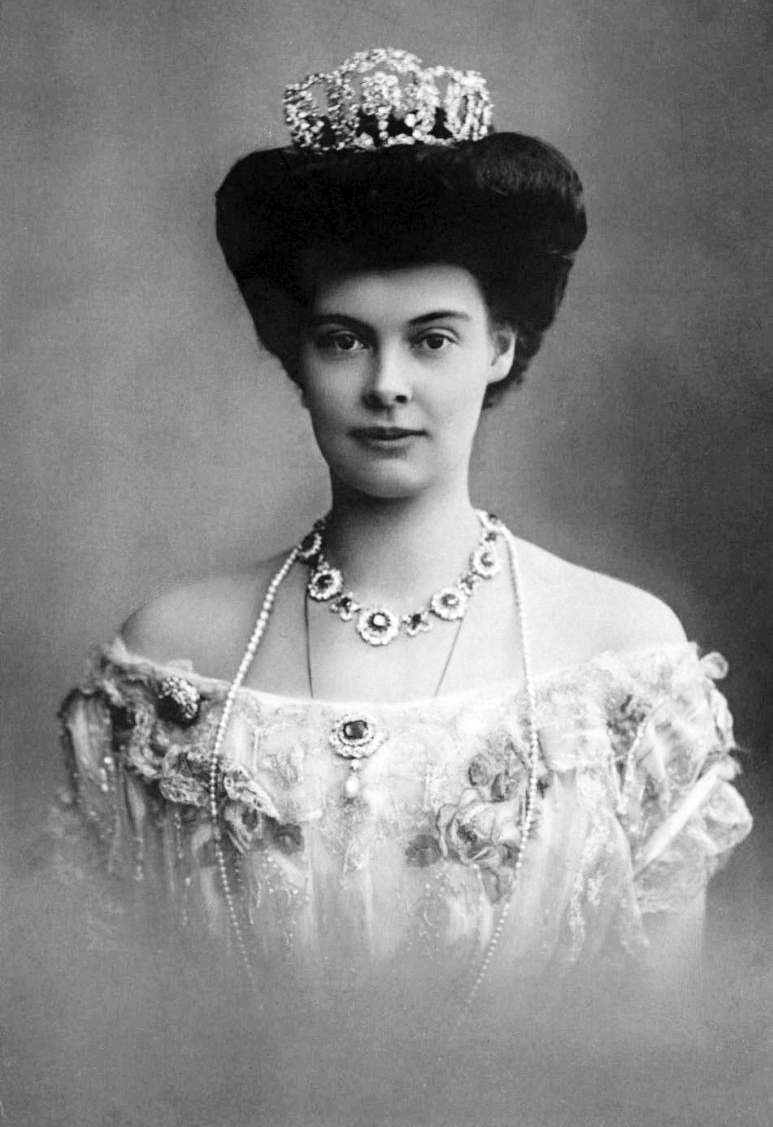
Duchess Cecilie of Mecklenburg-Schwerin, 1905

- Albert II, Duke of Mecklenburg (ca 1318 – 1379), feudal lord in Northern Germany
- Sophia Louise of Mecklenburg-Schwerin (1685 – 1735 in Schwerin Castle). Queen consort in Prussia by marriage to King Frederick I of Prussia
- Frederick Francis I (1756–1837), ruler as duke 1785/1815, and as grand duke 1815/1837
- Duchess Louise Charlotte of Mecklenburg-Schwerin (1779–1801), maternal grandmother of Prince Albert, the husband of Queen Victoria
- Duke Adolf Friedrich of Mecklenburg (1873–1969), Africa traveler, colonial politician and first President of the German Olympic Committee
- Alexandrine of Mecklenburg-Schwerin (1879–1952), Queen of Denmark, 1912/1947 & Queen of Iceland, 1918/1944
- Duchess Cecilie of Mecklenburg-Schwerin (1886–1954), last Crown Princess of the German Empire
- Friedrich Franz, Hereditary Grand Duke of Mecklenburg-Schwerin (1910–2001), heir apparent to the Grand Duchy of Mecklenburg-Schwerin

=== Arts ===
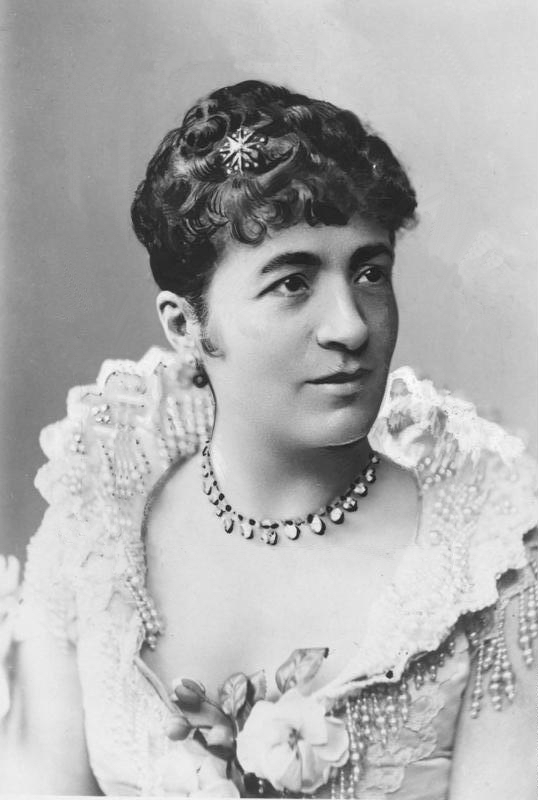
Franziska Ellmenreich

- Konrad Ernst Ackermann (1710–1771), actor
- Johann Heinrich Suhrlandt (1742–1827), court painter
- Friedrich Ludwig Schröder (1744–1816), actor, theatre director and playwright.
- Friederike Ellmenreich (1775–1845), contralto opera singer
- Albert Ellmenreich (1816–1905), composer
- Carl von Lemcke (1831–1913), art historian, songwriter, rector at the University of Stuttgart
- Pauline Soltau (1833–1902), portrait painter, violinist
- Marie Hankel (1844–1929), writer of Esperanto literature and advocate of women's suffrage.
- Franziska Ellmenreich (1847–1931), actress
- Friedrich Wachenhusen (1859–1925), landscape painter
- William Berwald (1864–1948), an American composer and conductor
- Otto Fedder (1873-1918), painter
- Alfred Meyer (1882–1956), German writer
- Paul Gösch (1885–1940), painter and architect, Nazi victim
- Max Burghardt (1893–1977), actor, director, and President of the Cultural Association of the GDR
- Wilhelm Facklam (1893–1972), landscape artist and draftsman
- Maria Bard (1900–1944), actress
- Rudolf Metzmacher (1906–2004), cellist
- Gudrun Zapf-von Hesse (1918–2019), typographer calligrapher and bookbinder
- Heinz Kippnick (1928–2019), graphic designer and heraldist
- Verena Keller (1942–2025), mezzo-soprano
- Katrin Sass (born 1956), actress
- Oliver Riedel (born 1971), musician, member of the band Rammstein

=== Politics ===
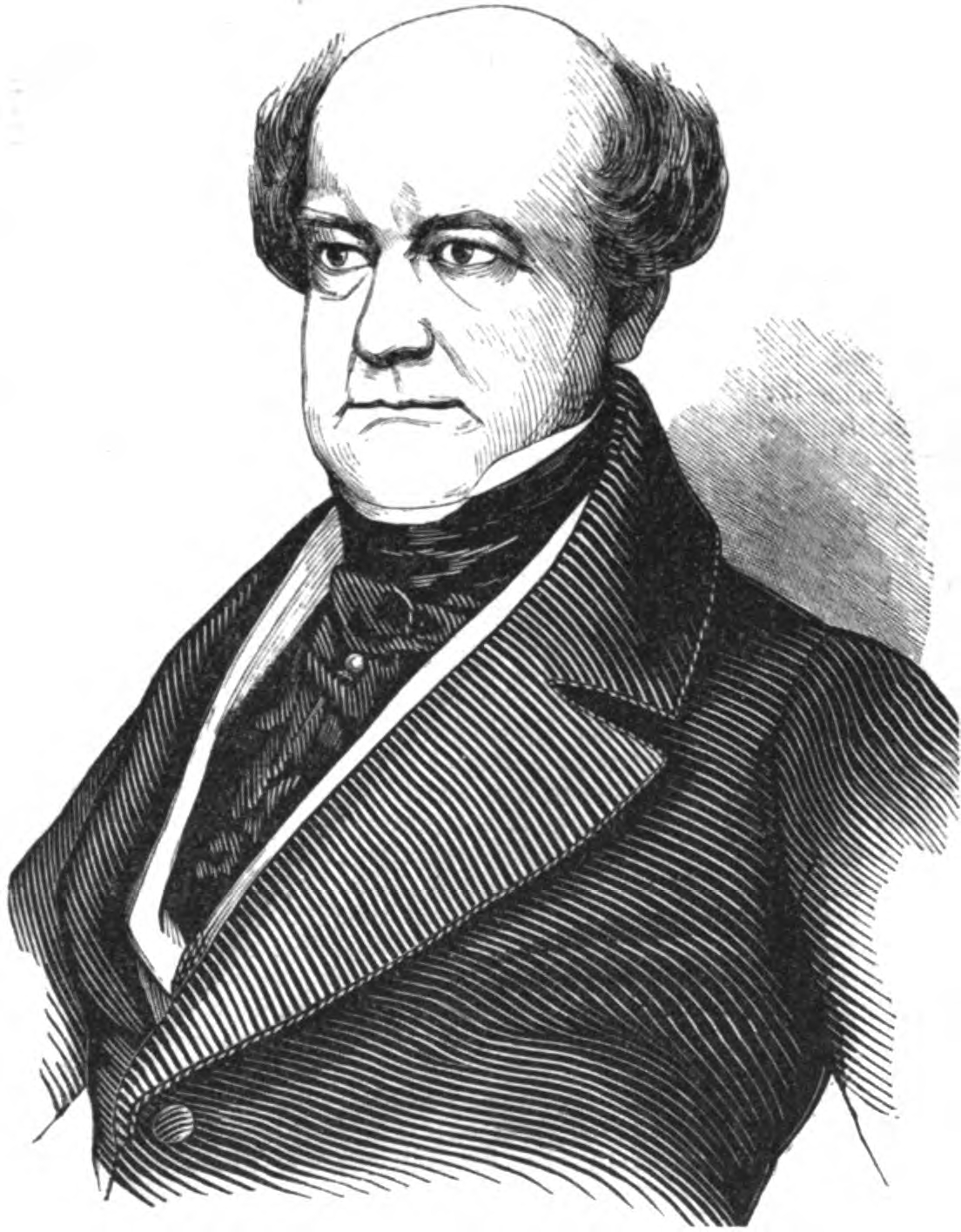
Heinrich von Bülow

- Karl Albert von Kamptz (1769–1849), lawyer, Prussian Minister of Justice from 1832 to 1842.
- Heinrich von Bülow (1792–1846), diplomat and Prussian statesman
- Heinrich Cunow (1862–1938), politician (SPD) and writer
- Wilhelm Friedrich Loeper (1883–1935), military officer and Nazi Party politician
- Hermann Baranowski (1884–1940), Nazi SS concentration camp commandant
- Wilhelm Gustloff (1895–1936), Nazi party leader, worked in Davos, assassinated
- André Brie (born 1950), politician (The Left), Member of the European Parliament, 1999/2009
- Heidrun Bluhm (born 1958), politician (The Left)
- Sebastian Ehlers (born 1982), politician
- Birger Gröning (born 1975), politician

=== Science ===
- August Kundt (1839–1894), physicist; invented Kundt's tube.
- Walther Flemming (1843–1905), biologist and founder of cytogenetics
- Friedrich Klockmann (1858–1937), mineralogist
- Heinrich Friese (1860–1948), entomologist and bee researcher
- Ludwig Bölkow (1912–2003), industrialist and aeronautical pioneer

=== Sports ===
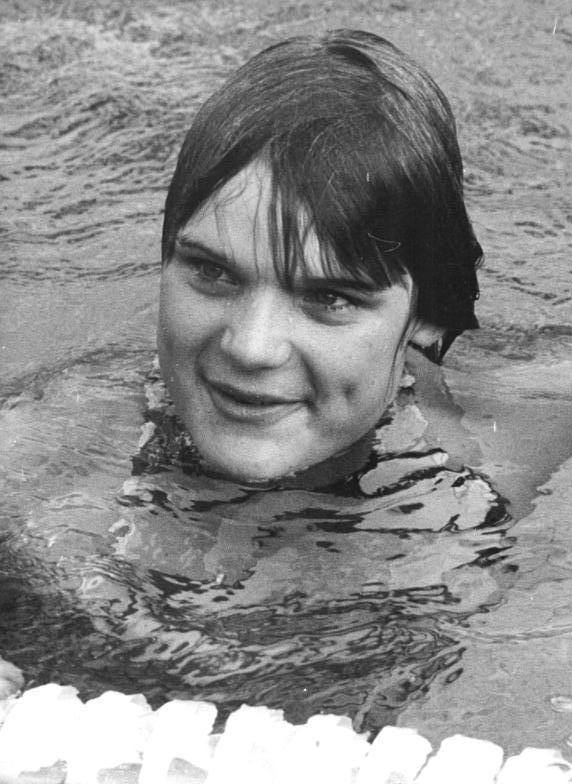
Andrea Pollack, 1977

- Manfred Schneider (born 1941), rower, bronze medallist at the 1972 Summer Olympics
- Detlef Pirsig (1945–2019), football player and manager; he played 385 matches
- Gabriele Hinzmann (born 1947), discus thrower; bronze medallist at the 1976 Summer Olympics
- Wolf-Rüdiger Netz (born 1950), former footballer, played over 300 games
- Anke Westendorf (born 1954), Olympic volleyball player
- Rosemarie Gabriel (born 1956), swimmer, team gold and silver medallist at the 1976 Summer Olympics
- Andrea Pollack (born 1961), swimmer, multiple medallist at the 1976 & 1980 Summer Olympics
- Torsten Bréchôt (born 1964) judoka, bronze medallist at the 1988 Summer Olympics
- Steffen Zühlke (born 1965), rower, bronze medallist at the 1988 Summer Olympics
- Matthias Stammann (born 1968), footballer, played 299 games
- Sylvia Roll (born 1973), Olympic volleyball player
- Hanka Durante (born 1976), Olympic volleyball player
- Robert Müller (born 1986), footballer, played 489 games
- Peter Kretschmer (born 1992), sprint canoer, gold medallist at the 2012 Summer Olympics

=== Others ===
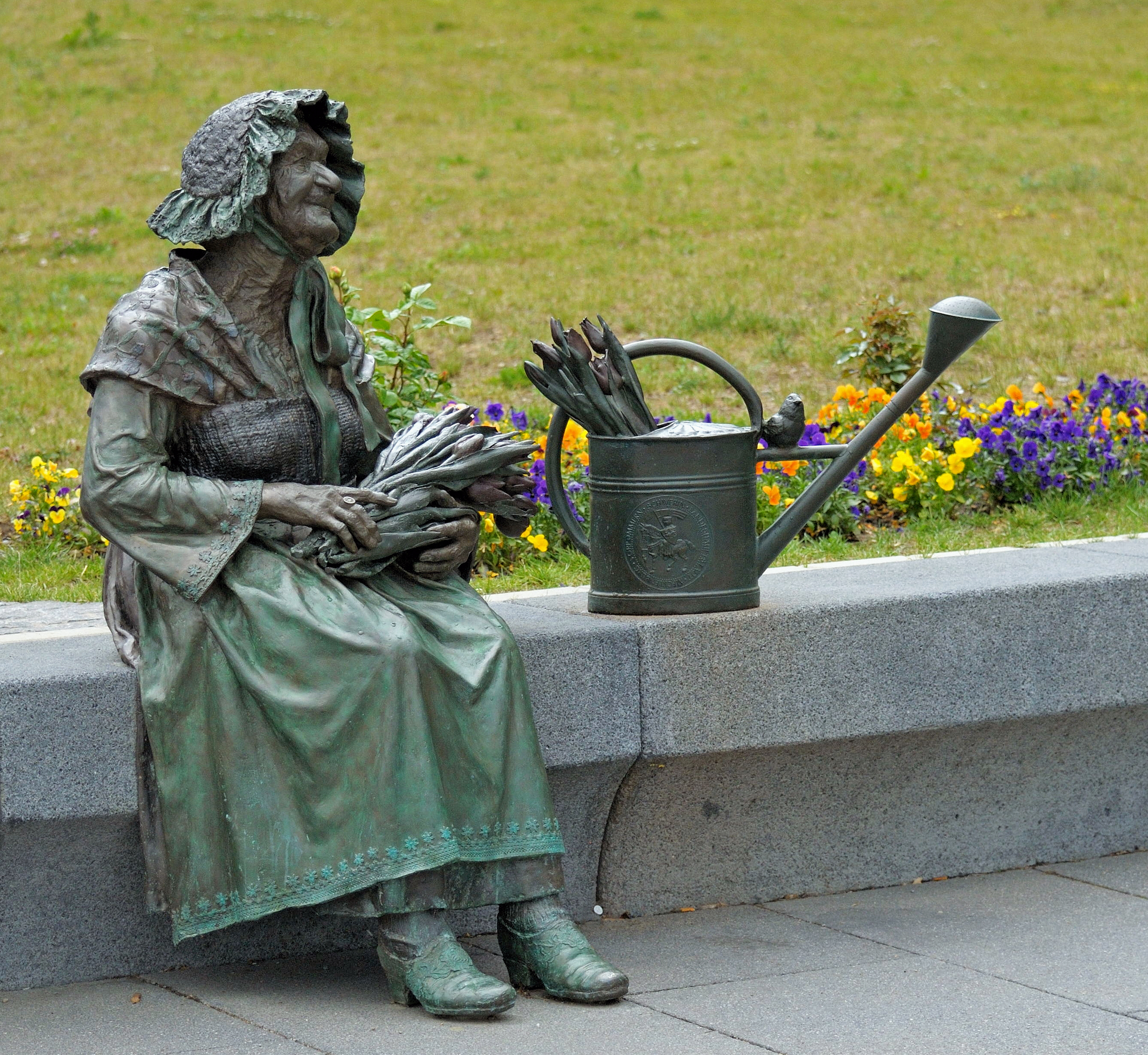
Bertha Klingberg

- Hans von Koester (1844–1928), naval officer, became Grand admiral
- Bernhard Schwentner (1891–1944), Catholic priest and resistance fighter
- Bertha Klingberg (1898–2005), florist, honorary citizen of Schwerin
