= Bertha Klingberg =

Florist and honorary citizen of Schwerin

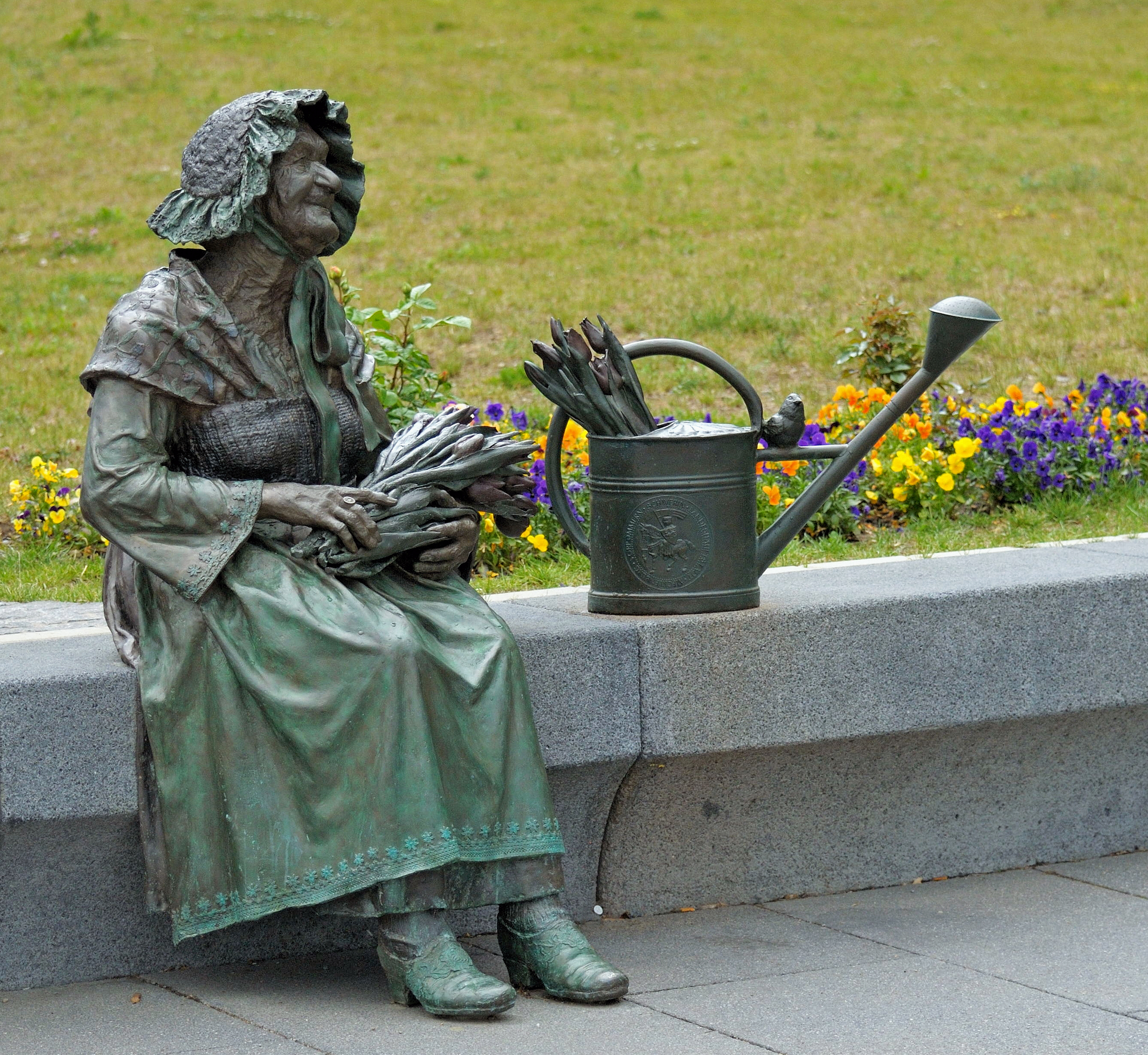
- Bronze statue of Bertha Klingberg
- Born: October 21, 1898; Hamburg, Germany
- Died: November 7, 2005 (aged 107); Schwerin, Germany
- Occupation: Florist

Bertha Klingberg (October 21, 1898 – November 7, 2005) was a florist and an honorary citizen of the city of Schwerin.

== Early life ==
Bertha Klingberg was born in Hamburg, Germany in 1898 and grew up with her grandparents in Bützow. She often visited Schwerin and discovered her love of flowers and nature at a young age. At ten-years-old, she climbed the fence of the Schwerin Palace gardens to admire the flowers but was caught by Grand Duke Friedrich-Franz III. After speaking to her, however, the Grand Duke allowed her to visit the gardens whenever she wanted. At fourteen, she started an apprenticeship as a florist in Rostock.

== Career ==
After her husband died in WWI, she and her son moved to Schwerin. After the war, she continued to work as a florist at the Schwerin butcher's market where she sold produce from her garden. She often wore traditional Rehna dress which, over the decades, contributed to her status as a city original.

In 1990, at the age of 91, she started a petition called "Our Schwerin must become the state capital", which advocated for Schwerin to become the capital of the federal state of Mecklenburg-Vorpommern. After collecting 17,000 signatures, her petition was successful and Schwerin became the capital of Mecklenburg-Vorpommern. For her efforts, she became the first and only recipient of the Honorary Ring of the State Capital Schwerin in 1993.

In 2002, the city council of Scherwin awarded Klingberg honorary citizenship.

== Death and legacy ==
On November 7, 2005, Klingberg died in a nursing home in Schwerin at the age of 107. She was buried at a family plot in the Old Cemetery in Schwerin.

On the occasion of the 2009 Federal Horticultural Show, Bertha Klingberg Square was inaugurated and served as the main entrance for the show. In June 2010, a life-size bronze sculpture by the Prignitz sculptor Bernd Streiter was erected in the square.

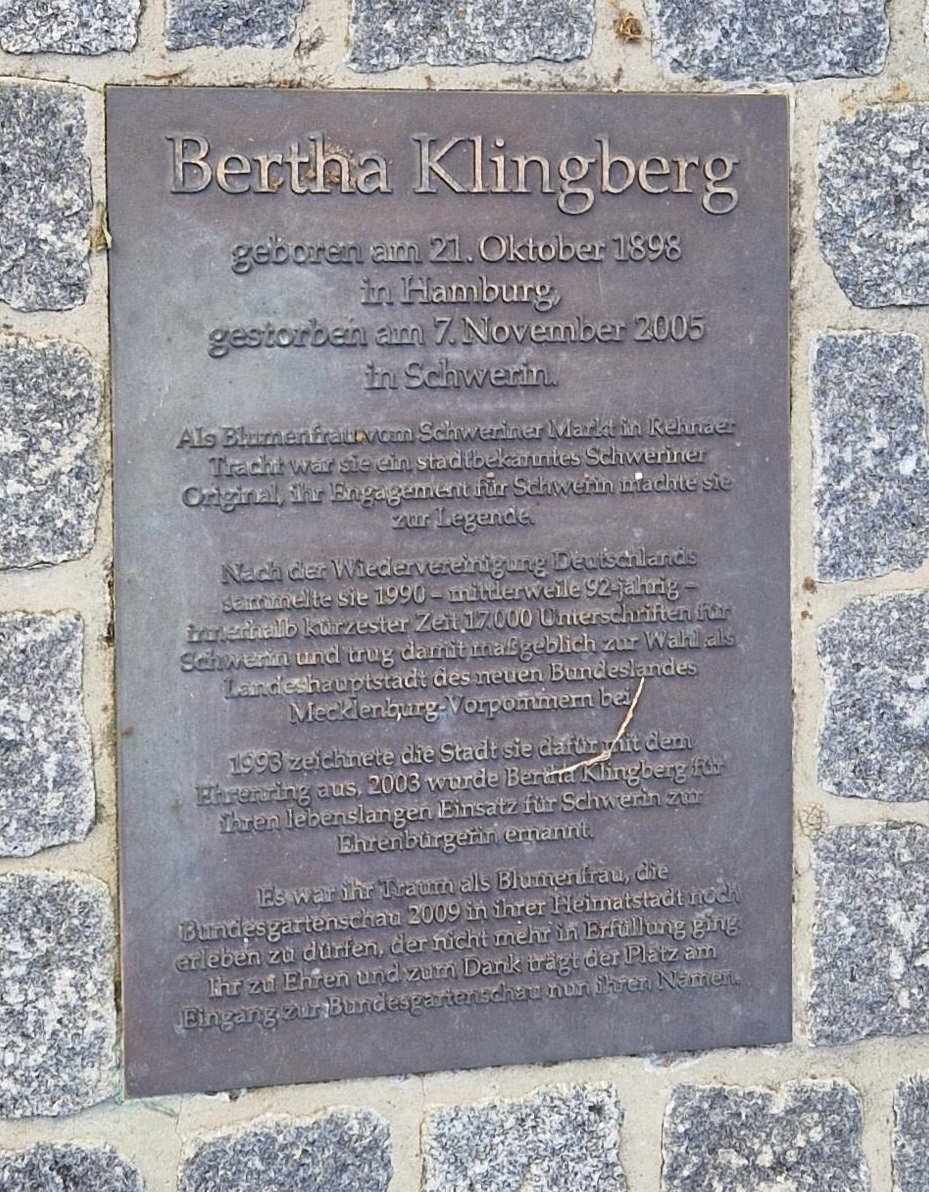
Plaque commemorating Bertha Klingberg

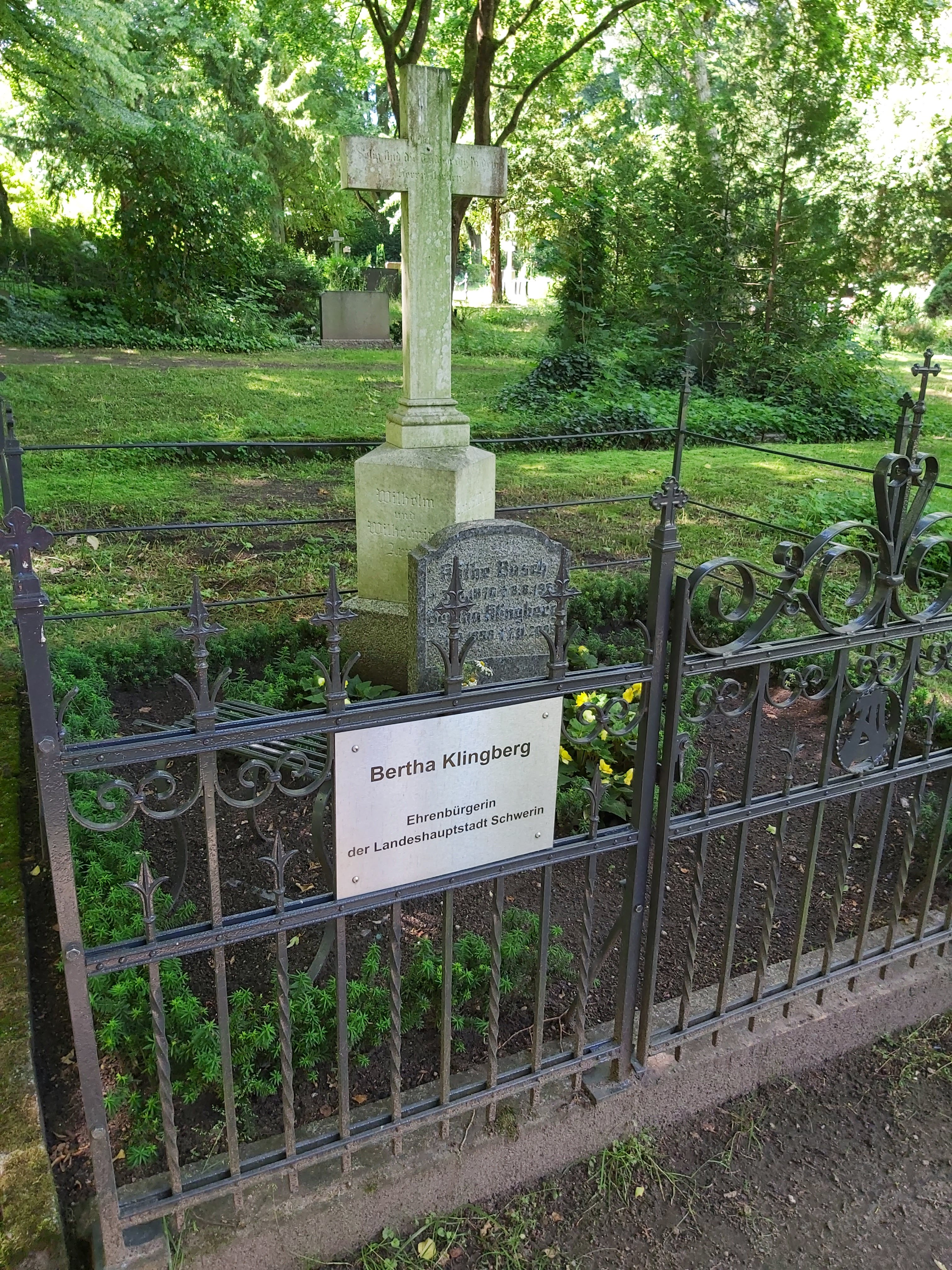
Klingberg's grave at the Old Cemetery in Schwerin
