= Otto Fedder =

German artist (1873–1919)

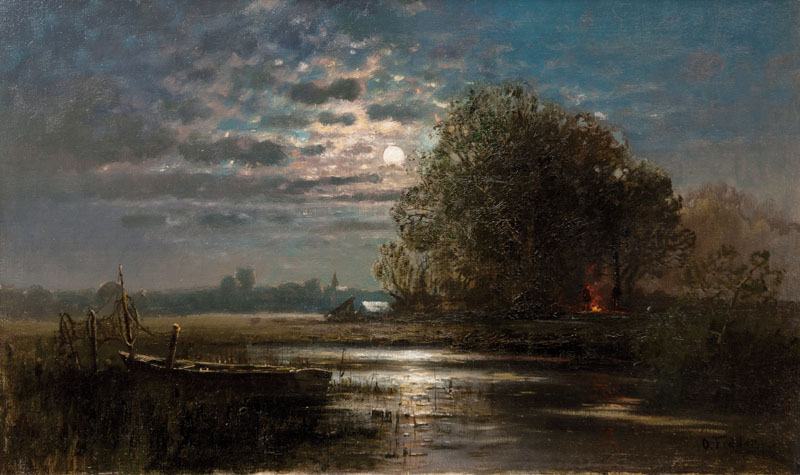
Moonscape

Otto Karl Heinrich Fritz Fedder (29 September 1873 in Schwerin – 7 December 1918 in Wildschwaige am Taubenberg near Darching) was a German landscape painter.

Fedder went to Munich in 1895, and studied painting at the Munich Art Academy under Wilhelm von Diez and Eduard Grützner. He painted almost exclusively romantic landscapes, mostly at sunset or moonlight, always in landscape format.

In 2019, Bavaria restituted to the heirs of Julius et Simone Davidsohn the painting by Fedder entitled Diligence dans les montagnes (Bayerische Staatsgemäldesammlungen Inv.-Nr. 12214). The Gestapo had confiscated it from the Davidsohns in 1938.

== Literature ==
- Fedder, Otto. In: Ulrich Thieme (Hrsg.): Allgemeines Lexikon der Bildenden Künstler von der Antike bis zur Gegenwart. Begründet von Ulrich Thieme und Felix Becker. Band 11: Erman–Fiorenzo. E. A. Seemann, Leipzig 1915, S. 331 (Textarchiv – Internet Archive).
- Fedder, Otto. In: Hans Vollmer (Hrsg.): Allgemeines Lexikon der bildenden Künstler des XX. Jahrhunderts. Band 2: E–J. E. A. Seemann, Leipzig 1955, S. 82.
- (in German) Staps, Sven-Wieland: Fedder, Otto. In: Allgemeines Künstlerlexikon. Die Bildenden Künstler aller Zeiten und Völker (AKL). Band 37, Saur, München u. a. 2003, ISBN 3-598-22777-9, S. 379
