= Bombing of Schwerin =

Military actions during WWII

Bombing of Schwerin during World War II
- Part of Strategic bombing during World War II
Date	1940, 1945
Location	Schwerin
Result	3% of the city destroyed, 224 deaths

Belligerents
United States United Kingdom	Germany

Strength
4 bombing raids	

The bombing of Schwerin were a series of Allied - mainly United States Army Air Force - aerial bombing attacks on the city of Schwerin during World War II. A total of four air raids were carried in 1940 and 1945 as part of the Allied campaign of strategic bombing of Germany. However, unlike nearby Lübeck, Hamburg and Rostock, the city itself escaped major damage.

== Background ==
Unlike the nearby naval and industrial hubs of Hamburg and Rostock, Schwerin was not seen as a target of opportunity by the Allies until 1945 and even then, it was seen as a low value target. A total of seven lakes surround the city, the largest of which is Lake Schwerin. Because of this, along with Schwerin being a historic old town with the popular Schwerin Castle, Schwerin did not have any major war industry that was established here at the time.

== Attacks ==
In July 1940, a small bombing raid was carried out by the British Royal Air Force on Schwerin. As a result, some houses were destroyed. The historic inner city as well as the Celle Castle escaped any major attacks for the time being.

After the July 1940 raid, the city had long been considered one of the few "bomb-free" cities of Germany. This changed near the end of the war, with the first bombing raid in nearly five years happening on April 7, 1945. On that Saturday morning, 182 American planes of the Eighth Air Force took off from southern England. flew over and hit the city's freight station as well as the Feldstadt district of Schwerin. The airfield at nearby Parchim was considered the main target that day, Schwerin itself was considered a 'plan B'. While most of the bombs hit the Parchim airfield, cloudiness and uncertainty about the weather and the danger of returning home with undetonated bombs, made the pilots decide to hit the freight station in Schwerin to get rid of the payload. However, the 1500 dropped bombs initially fell almost 2 Kilometers away from the freight station for a duration of 12 minutes. Initially people suspected the pilots mistook the nearby tram depot on the Wallstraße for the freight station, but this was later disproven. The exact cause for the pilots to miss their target remains unclear to this day. Later that day, another 304 bombs were thrown on Schwerin, this time hitting and destroying the freight station. Because many people that day did not react to the alarm from the sirens due to the inhabitants of Schwerin being used to planes flying over and nothing happening to them for years, the death toll of the attack was high. Ultimately, 224 civilians died from the April 7 attack, 42 houses ended up being destroyed (12 of which were on the Wallstraße alone) and over 80 ended up being damaged. The city's cemetery was also hit, causing some graves to be 'dug up' by the hits and body parts and skeletal remains to be scattered all over the cemetery. The second big aerial attack on Schwerin followed on 19 April of that year, this time in the middle of the night. Ultimately, Schwerin was liberated when American troops entered the city on the 2 May 1945. Because the historic and known Schwerin Castle largely escaped any damage during the bombing raids, it was used as a refugee shelter near the end of the war.

== After the war ==
After the Americans liberated Schwerin in May 1945, the war also ended for the city. Schwerin however would be subjected to a change of stationed troops, with British forces briefly taking over on May 30. Eventually, Schwerin ended up narrowly falling under the Soviet sphere, which meant the Soviets entered the city. Multiple cases of rape by Soviet soldiers in Schwerin were later also reported by locals.

== Destruction ==
After the war ended, reconstruction began in the area's that were hit. Houses and apartments that were damaged were restored or torn down and the destroyed buildings were cleared and rebuilt in the typical Traditionalist style of the 1950s. Today on Wallstraße 46, traces of debris of bombs that impacted the building can still be found on the beige plaster of the house. Similar traces can be found on houses at Voßstraße and Friedensstraße

The precise death toll of all the air raids is unknown, but the April 7 cost the lives of at least 224 people alone. The attack that day also destroyed 42 houses, 12 of which were on the Wallstraße alone. Another 80 ended up being damaged. In total, 3% of the city was destroyed.

== See also ==
- Strategic bombing during World War II
- Bombing of Hamburg in World War II
