= Große Karausche =

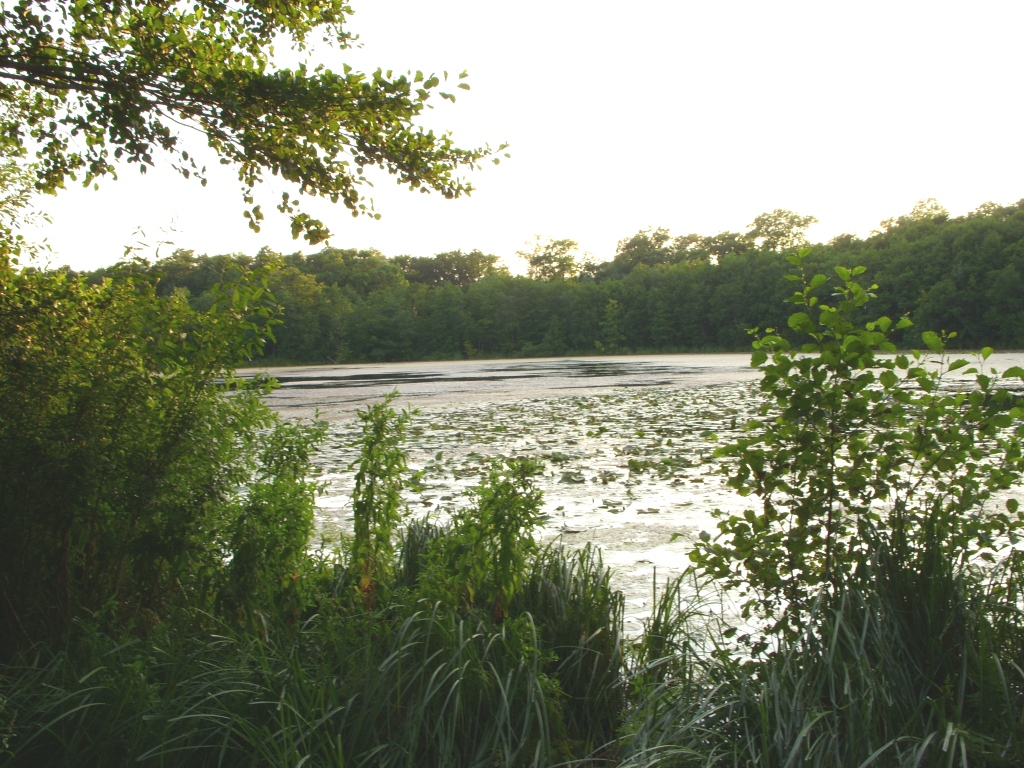

- Location within Mecklenburg-Vorpommern
- Location: West Mecklenburg, Schwerin
- Coordinates: 53°37′7″N 11°25′46″E
- Type: natural freshwater lake
- Basin countries: Germany
- Max. length: 165 metres (541 ft)
- Max. width: 145 metres (476 ft)
- Surface area: 0.017 km^{2} (0.0066 sq mi)
- Average depth: 1.2 m (3 ft 11 in)
- Max. depth: 4 m (13 ft)
- Surface elevation: ca. 38 m (125 ft)
- Settlements: Schwerin

The Grosse (Große) Karausche is a lake in Schwerin, Mecklenburg-Vorpommern, Germany. Its surface area is 0.017 km², the average water depth is 1.2 meters.
