= Klein Rogahn =

- Municipality
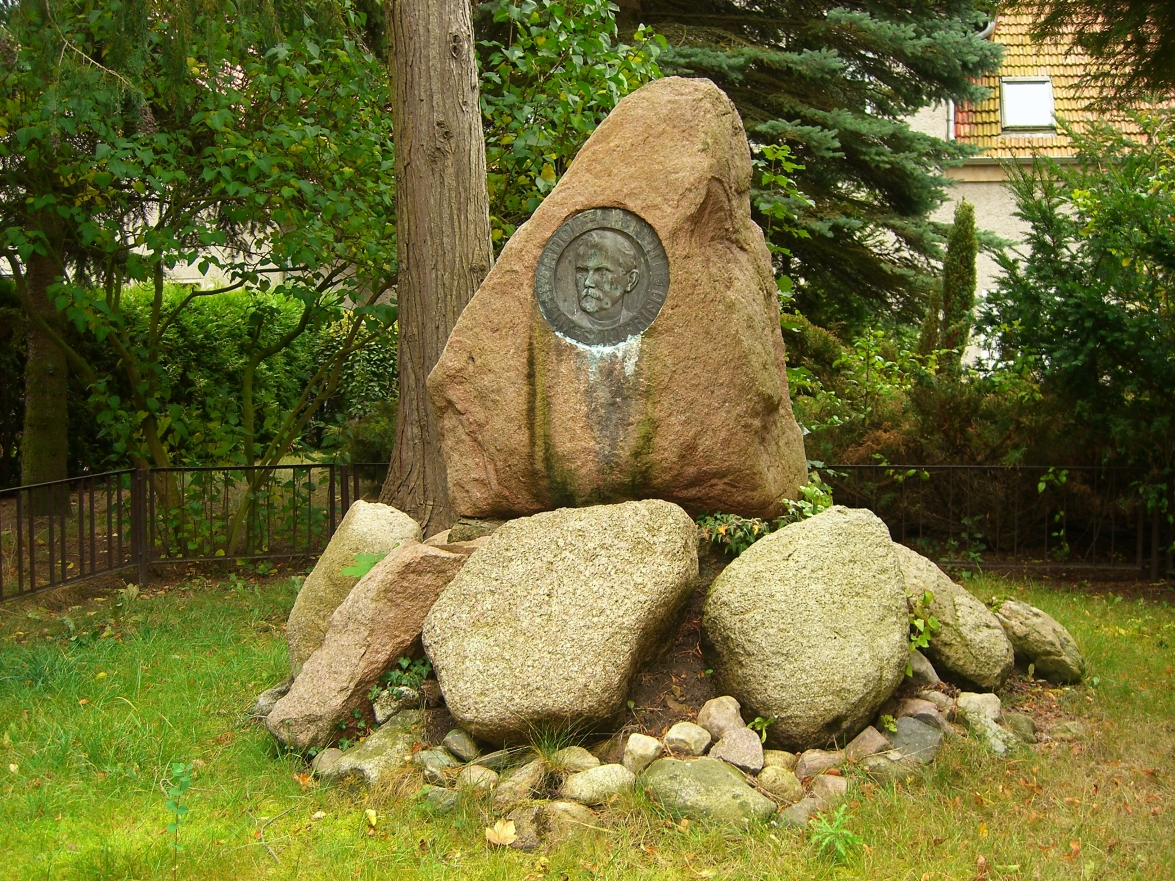
- Memorial to writer Felix Stillfried in Klein Rogahn

- Location of Klein Rogahn within Ludwigslust-Parchim district
- Interactive map of Klein Rogahn
- Location within Germany Location within Mecklenburg-Vorpommern
- Coordinates: 53°36′N 11°20′E
- Country: Germany
- State: Mecklenburg-Vorpommern
- District: Ludwigslust-Parchim
- Municipal assoc.: Stralendorf
- Subdivisions: 2

Government
  - Mayor: Michael Vollmerich

Area
  - Total: 10.99 km^{2} (4.24 sq mi)
- Elevation: 40 m (130 ft)

Population (2025-12-31)
  - Total: 1,360
  - Density: 124/km^{2} (321/sq mi)
- Time zone: UTC+01:00 (CET)
  - Summer (DST): UTC+02:00 (CEST)
- Postal codes: 19073
- Dialling codes: 0385
- Vehicle registration: LWL
- Website: www.amt-stralendorf.de

Klein Rogahn is a municipality in the Ludwigslust-Parchim district, in Mecklenburg-Vorpommern, Germany.

== Notable people ==
- Gerhard Baumann (1921–2006), martial music composer
- Bruno Wansierski (1904–1994), political commissar (SED) and vice admiral of the National People's Army of East Germany
