= Burgsee (Schwerin) =

Lake in Schwerin, Mecklenburg-Vorpommern, Germany

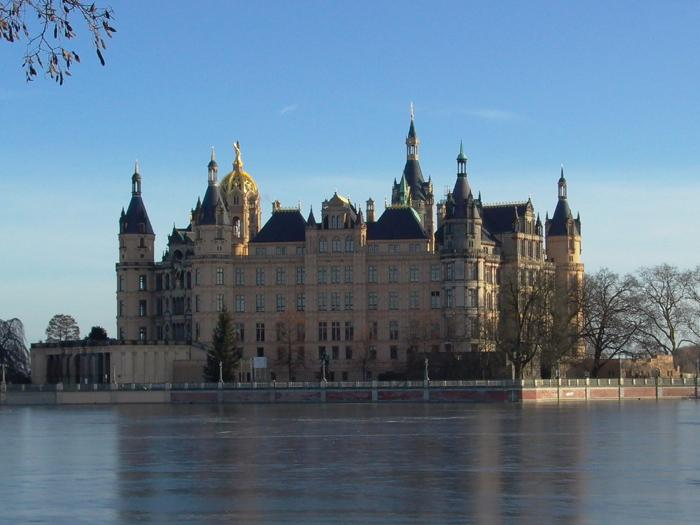

- Location within Mecklenburg-Vorpommern
- Location: Schwerin, Nordwestmecklenburg, Mecklenburg-Vorpommern
- Coordinates: 53°37′27″N 11°24′54″E
- Basin countries: Germany
- Surface area: 0.111 km^{2} (0.043 sq mi)
- Max. depth: 3.5 m (11 ft)
- Surface elevation: 37.8 m (124 ft)
- Settlements: Schwerin

Burgsee is a lake at Schwerin, Nordwestmecklenburg, Mecklenburg-Vorpommern, Germany. At an elevation of 37.8 m, its surface area is 0.111 km^{2} (0.043 sq mi).
