= Burgsee (Schleswig) =

Lake in Germany

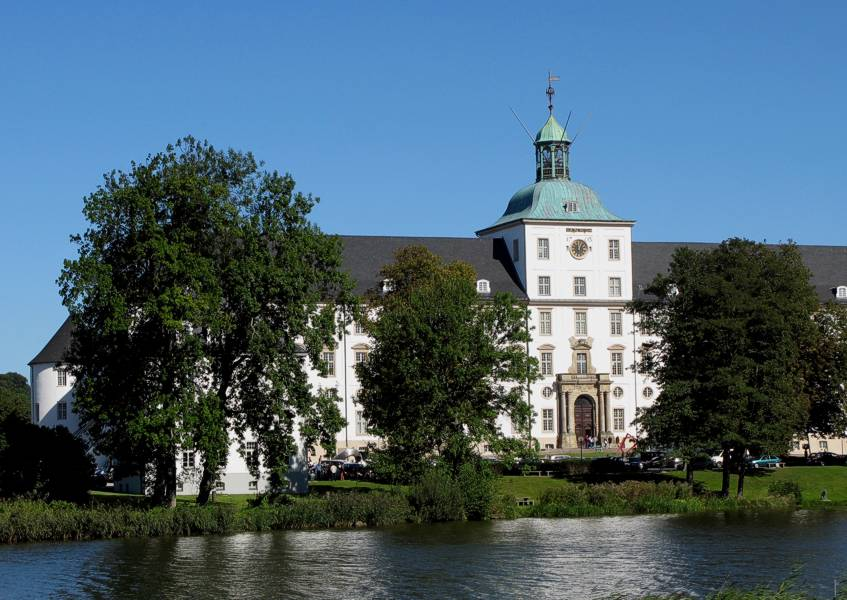

- Location within Schleswig-Holstein
- Location: Schleswig, Schleswig-Holstein
- Coordinates: 54°30′38″N 09°32′06″E
- Primary outflows: Schlei
- Basin countries: Germany
- Max. length: 970 m (3,180 ft)
- Max. width: 460 m (1,510 ft)
- Surface area: 31.83 ha (78.7 acres)

Burgsee (Danish: Gottorp Sø) is a lake in Schleswig, Schleswig-Holstein, Germany. Its surface area is 31.83 ha.
