= Prince-Bishopric of Ratzeburg =

German ecclesiastical polity

Prince-Bishopric of Ratzeburg Fürstbistum Ratzeburg (German)
- 1236–1648
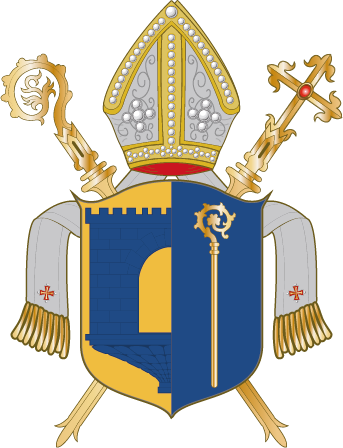
- Coat of arms

- The Prince-Bishopric of Ratzeburg shown within Mecklenburg c. 1250
- Status: State of the Holy Roman Empire
- Capital: Ratzeburg
- Common languages: Low Saxon, German
- Religion: Catholic, Lutheran after 1554
- Government: Elective monarchy, ruled by the bishop or administrator holding the episcopal see, elected by the chapter or, exceptionally, appointed by the Pope
- Historical era: Middle Ages
  - Diocese founded: c. 1050
  - Pagan Wends destroy bishopric: 15 July 1066
  - Diocese refounded: 1154
  - Saxo-Bavarian Duke Henry the Lion defeated; break-up of the Duchy of Saxony: 1180/1181
  - Acquired territory: 1236
  - Lutheran Reformation: 1554
  - Secularised to Mecklenburg-Güstrow: 1648
  - Became exclave of Mecklenburg-Strelitz: 1701
Preceded by	Succeeded by
Duchy of Saxony	Mecklenburg-Güstrow

The Prince-Bishopric of Ratzeburg (German: Fürstbistum Ratzeburg) was an ecclesiastical principality of the Holy Roman Empire that was located in what is today the states of Schleswig-Holstein (the district of Herzogtum Lauenburg) and Mecklenburg-Vorpommern (the district of Nordwestmecklenburg) in Germany. It was established in 1236 and disestablished following the Peace of Westphalia in 1648. The state capital was the city of Ratzeburg. The Diocese of Ratzeburg had originally been established as a diocese of the Catholic Church in the 11th century but had fallen into abeyance; as a result of the Wendish Crusade, the diocese was re-created in the middle of the 12th century. The territory of the prince-bishopric was managed by secular lords on behalf of the Bishop of Ratzeburg. As a Prince-Bishopric of the Empire, the territory of the state was not identical with that of the bishopric, but was located within its boundaries and made up about a quarter of the diocesan area. When the Prince-Bishopric was disestablished, a new entity was established — the Principality of Ratzeburg. The principality became an exclave of the Duchy of Mecklenburg-Strelitz.

== Background ==
=== County of Ratezeburg and the Land of Butin ===
Count Henry of Badewide feuded with Count Adolf II of Schauenburg over the counties of Holstein and Wagria. In 1143, the Duke of Saxony — Henry the Lion — mediated between the two counts, granting Wagria and Segeberg to Adolf. Henry was granted Polabia and Ratzeburg. The newly created County of Ratzenburg included Ratzeburg, Boitin, Gadebusch, Wittenburg, and Boizenburg. The count pursued a policy of expelling the native Slavs and inviting Westphalians to settle in the conquered territory. Henry received the titles Comes Polaborum (1154), Graf von Ratzeburg (1156), and Vogt von Ratzeburg (1162). He was succeeded by his son, Bernard I, Count of Ratzeburg. The title died out at the beginning of the thirteenth century with the death of Bernard's grandson, Bernard III.

The Land of Boitin was first mentioned in 1158 in the endowment document by Henry the Lion as Butin.. The name goes back to the Bytiner Polabian people. As a result of a sound change still detectable in the Drawenopolabian language, y became oi, Bytin became Boitin.

The boundaries of the Land of Boitin are described in the endowment deed as follows:

...from Lübecker Landgraben up to a heap of stones near Bünstorf and from there further through the middle of the Menzendorfer See and from there in a straight line to a large stone, from this in the common forest to a place popularly called Mannhagen, near Carlow and in the forest called Riepser Sumpf, in the direction of Schlagsdorf and from there along of the Lenschower Bach up to its confluence with the Wakenitz.

The Land of Boitin thus roughly encompassed the area of today's municipalities of Selmsdorf, Schönberg (Mecklenburg), Siemz-Niendorf and Lüdersdorf in the Northwest Mecklenburg district.

== Erection of prince-bishopric ==
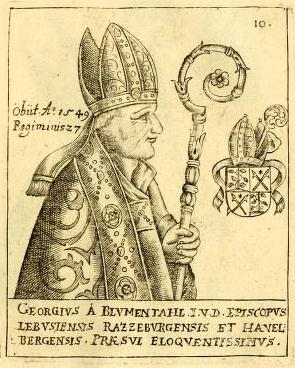
Georg von Blumenthal, the last Catholic Prince-Bishop (1490–1550)

In 1236 the Holy Roman Emperor, Frederick II, created a new prince-bishopric with Imperial immediacy which had temporal jurisdiction over the land of Butin and a number of villages outside it. Bishop Peter was the first prince-bishop and his successors inherited the titles ex officio. Succeeding prince-bishops retained this jurisdiction despite attempts by the dukes of Saxe-Lauenburg made to deprive them of it. At the beginning of the 14th century, under Bishop Markward von Jesowe, the Ratzeburg bishops began to round off the Boitin region.

== Disestablishment ==
During the Protestant Reformation, the cathedral chapter adhered to Lutheranism. They began to elect candidates who did not conform to canon law (i.e. they were not validly ordained or they failed to secure papal confirmation). Such candidates only held the title of "Diocesan Administrator" but were colloquially called "Prince-Bishop". Five such Diocesan Administrators were elected between 1554 and 1648. When the last Catholic bishop apostatized in 1554, he retained possession of the prince-bishopric. The capitulars deliberately ignored the ducal Saxe-Lauenburgian candidates, sons of the duke, fearing the prince-bishopric would then be incorporated into Saxe-Lauenburg.

Prince-Bishop Georg von Blumenthal (1524–50), who feuded with Thomas Aderpul, was the last Catholic bishop. In 1552, the cathedral was plundered by Count Volrad von Mansfeld. By the terms of the Peace of Westphalia, the prince-bishopric was secularized in 1648 becoming the Principality of Ratzeburg. The principality was under the control of the Dukes of Mecklenburg. In 1701 the principality became an exclave of Mecklenburg-Strelitz.
