= Utecht =

- Municipality
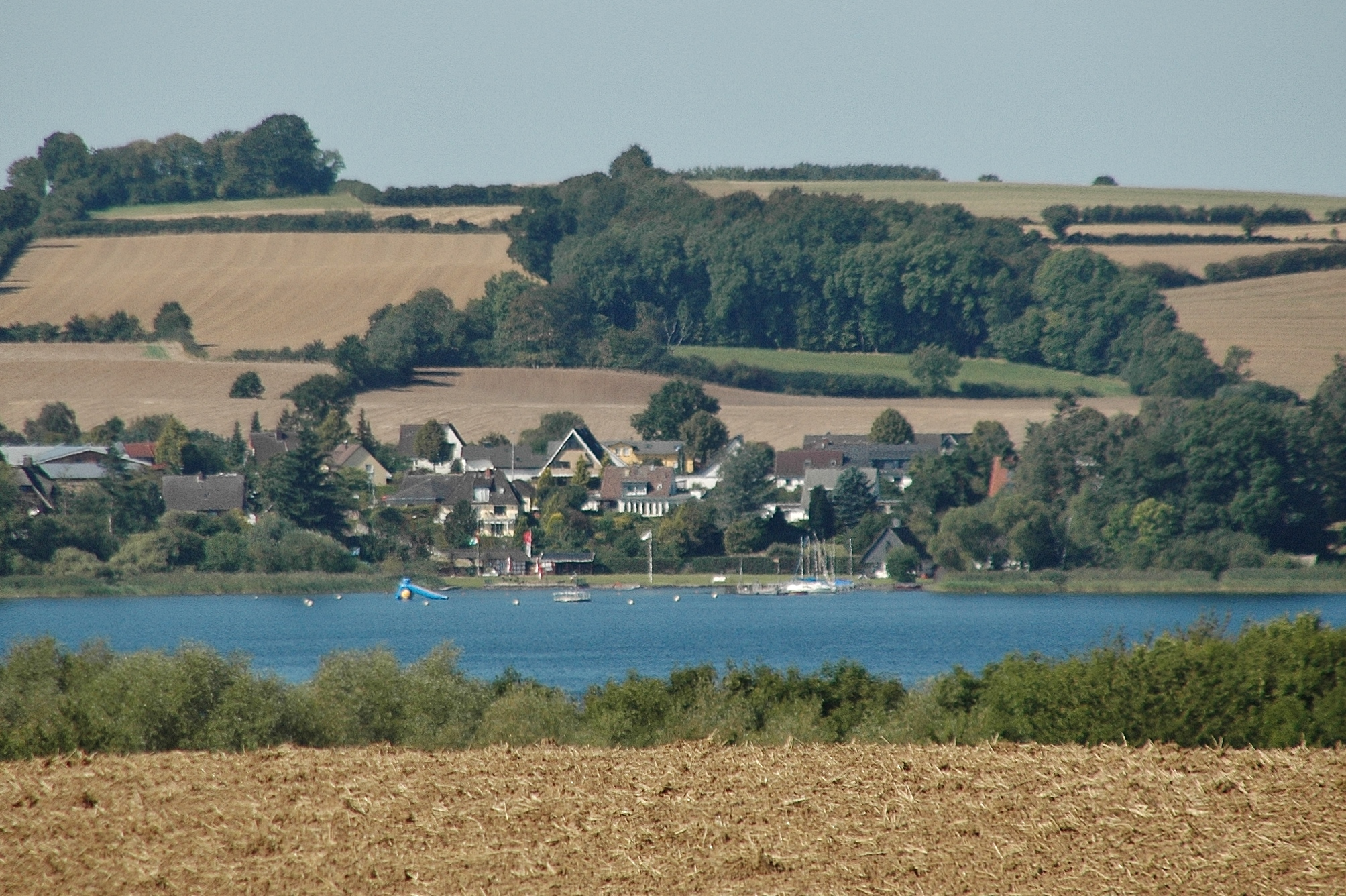
- Utecht

- Location of Utecht within Nordwestmecklenburg district
- Interactive map of Utecht
- Location within Germany Location within Mecklenburg-Vorpommern
- Coordinates: 53°46′N 10°46′E
- Country: Germany
- State: Mecklenburg-Vorpommern
- District: Nordwestmecklenburg
- Municipal assoc.: Rehna

Government
  - Mayor: Andreas Spiewack

Area
  - Total: 11.03 km^{2} (4.26 sq mi)
- Elevation: 44 m (144 ft)

Population (2025-12-31)
  - Total: 383
  - Density: 34.7/km^{2} (89.9/sq mi)
- Time zone: UTC+01:00 (CET)
  - Summer (DST): UTC+02:00 (CEST)
- Postal codes: 19217
- Dialling codes: 038875
- Vehicle registration: NWM

Utecht is a municipality in the Nordwestmecklenburg district, in Mecklenburg-Vorpommern, Germany. The municipality is managed by Rehna (Amt).

== Geography ==
The municipality of Utecht lies between Lübeck and Ratzeburg, on the northeast shore of the Great Ratzeburg Lake. The lakeshore is also the border with Schleswig-Holstein. The area rises from the Ratzeburg Lake (4 m above sea level) further east to 82 m above sea level. Utecht is surrounded by the neighboring communities of Lüdersdorf in the north, Thandorf in the east, Schlagsdorf in the southeast, Römnitz and Bäk in the south and Groß Sarau in the west (partial maritime border).
