= Teschow (surname) =

Surname

- The location of Teschow in the town of Teterow in Mecklenburg-Vorpommern
- Pronunciation: Tesh-oh

Origin
- Origin: Polabian
- Meaning: "Place of comfort" Tešów → Teschow
- Region of origin: Germany; Mecklenburg-Vorpommern

Other names
- Variant forms: Teschau, Toschew, Tischow, Teshow, Taschow

Teschow is a North German surname of Lechitic West Slavic origin.

== Origin and variants ==
Teschow is a habitational name from the former village (now district) of "Teschow" in the town of Teterow, or any one of several other places called "Teschow" in the Rostock district of the northeastern German state of Mecklenburg-Vorpommern.

Teschow is originally a Polabian name as evidenced by the West Slavic suffix ending "-ow" ("-ów") which can be possessive meaning "of the," or "belonging to," or locational, meaning "place of." This suffix is commonly found in surnames and place names throughout Mecklenburg-Vorpommern, and is generally very common throughout northeastern Germany. Etymologically, the name Teschow likely means "place of comfort," derived from a combination of the West Slavic word "teš" (Germanized "Tesch") meaning "comfort" or "consolation," and the suffix "-ów." (Germanized “ow”)

A relatively rare surname, it is historically concentrated in the state in and around the district of Rostock, the municipalities of Stepenitztal and Selmsdorf in the district of Nordwestmecklenburg, and in and around the city of Lübeck in the neighboring state of Schleswig-Holstein.

Until the gradual standardization of German spelling with the introduction of compulsory education in late 18th and early 19th centuries, many names displayed wide variations in spelling. In addition, as was quite common in earlier eras of mass migration, many immigrants either changed their surnames completely, or decided to use one of a number of various anglicized spellings of their original surnames, which further led to wide variations in the spelling and pronunciation of what was originally the same name. As such, different variations of surnames such as Teschow usually have the same origin.
