= Bardowiek =

Abandoned village in Germany

Coordinates: 53°52′N 10°50′E

Location of Bardowiek in Mecklenburg-Vorpommern

Bardowiek (German pronunciation: [ˈbaʁdoviːk]) is an abandoned village in Mecklenburg-Vorpommern, Germany. It lies in the territory of the municipality Selmsdorf.

== History ==
The earliest surviving record of Bardowiek is in the Ratzeburger Hufenregister and dates from 1292. The town was virtually destroyed during the Thirty Years War, but was rebuilt after the war's end in 1648.

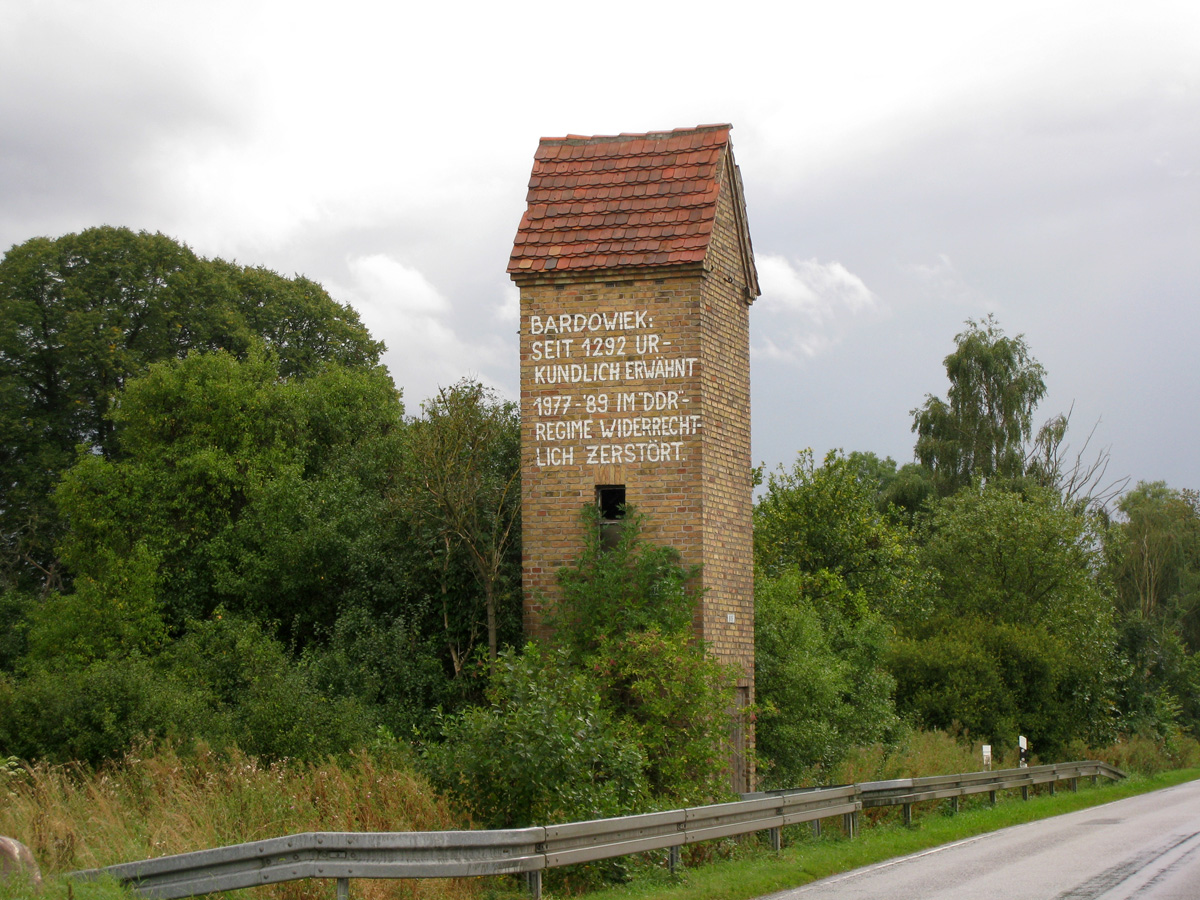
All that remains of Bardowiek. The inscription on the lone transformer tower reads, "Bardowiek: mentioned in historical records since 1292; illegally destroyed between 1977 and 1989 by the 'DDR' regime."

During the early years of the German Democratic Republic there were still approximately forty residents. However, Bardowiek found itself in the five kilometre wide closed zone, a strip of land cleared by the government directly to the east of the Inner German border. In 1960, all the farmsteads were incorporated into the farming collective of Palingen. Destruction of the former farms began in 1977 and was completed only in 1989. After the reunification, surviving former residents sought to rebuild the village. However, their aspirations have been thwarted by a succession of legal disputes.

== Context of Bardowiek's destruction ==
In the district of North-west Mecklenburg alone, no fewer than thirteen separate villages were destroyed during the later decades of the East German state in order to clear a strip of land beside the Inner German border. This was done to create a larger territory of a "no-go area" closest to the border to West Germany after the east became concerned about the extent of emigration to the western state. Other nearby destroyed villages included Lenschow, Wahlstorf (Lüdersdorf), Lankow (Mustin) and Neuhof (Gadebusch).
