= Crossing the inner German border =

Border crossings between East and West Germany

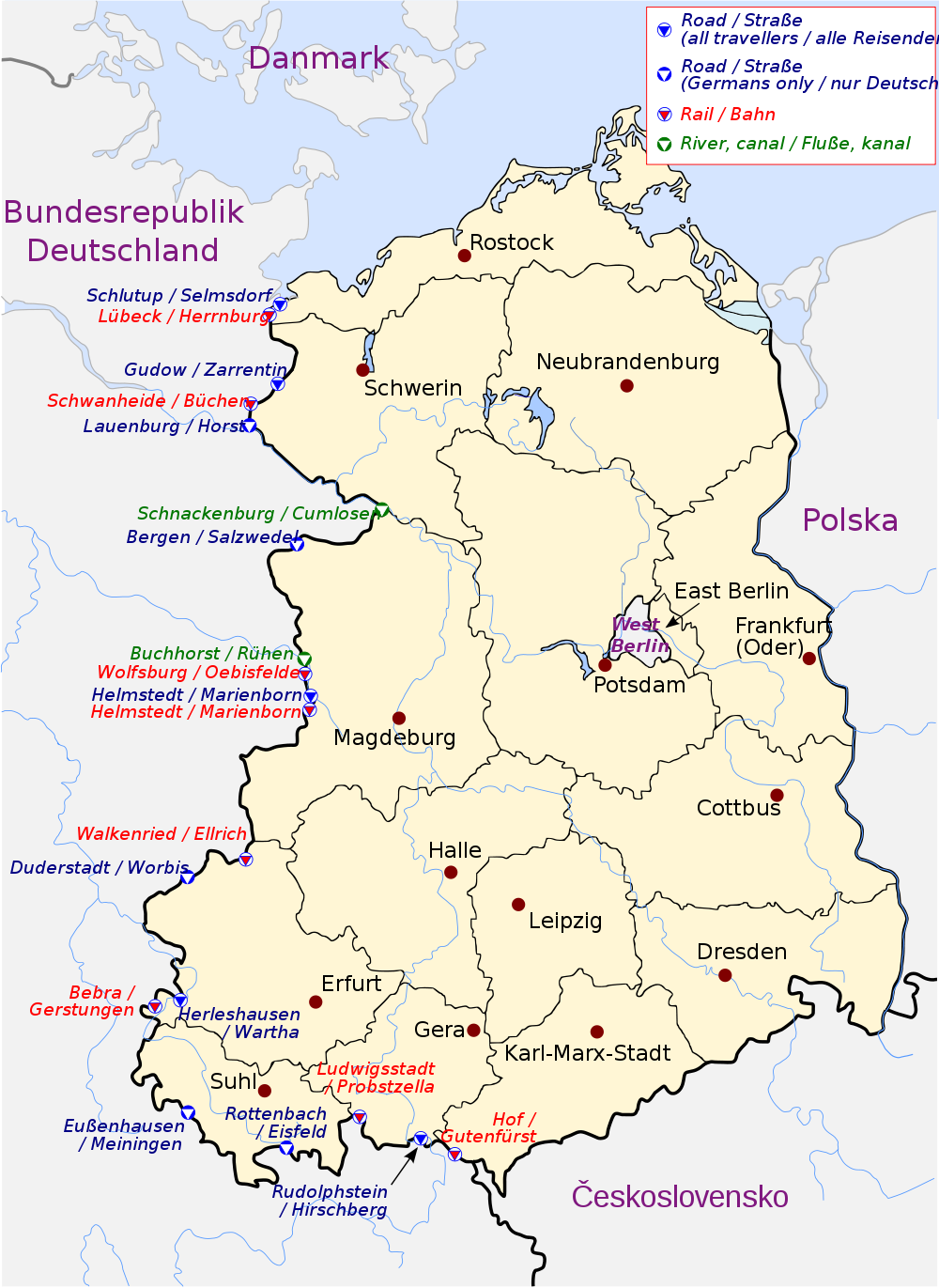
Crossing points on the inner German border, 1982

Crossing the inner German border between East and West Germany remained possible throughout the Cold War; it was never as thoroughly sealed in the fashion of the border between the two Koreas, though there were severe restrictions on the movement of East German citizens. The post-war agreements on the governance of Berlin specified that the Western Allies were to have access to the city via defined air, road, rail and river links. This was mostly respected by the Soviets and East Germans, albeit with periodic interruptions and harassment of travellers. The worst disruption to this was in 1948 during the Berlin Blockade when supplies could only be brought in by air – the famous Berlin Airlift – although Allied military convoys could pass through East Germany en route to Berlin.

The border could be crossed legally only through a limited number of air, road, rail and river routes. Travellers to and from Denmark, Sweden, Poland and Czechoslovakia could also pass through East Germany. Access rights for non-Germans were otherwise very restricted. Foreigners had to submit an itinerary to the East German state tourist office up to nine weeks in advance, paying booking fees and registering with the local police on arrival, purchasing fuel only from specially approved petrol stations and spending a prescribed minimum of money each day. They were required to stay in state-owned "Interhotels", where rooms cost five to ten times more than the price of the (very few) ordinary East German hotels. Given these restrictions, not surprisingly, East Germany did not develop much of a tourist industry; even as late as May 1990, there were only 45,000 hotel beds in the entire country. Westerners found crossing the inner German border to be a somewhat disturbing experience. Jan Morris wrote:

Travelling from west to east through [the inner German border] was like entering a drab and disturbing dream, peopled by all the ogres of totalitarianism, a half-lit world of shabby resentments, where anything could be done to you, I used to feel, without anybody ever hearing of it, and your every step was dogged by watchful eyes and mechanisms.

Each of the different means of crossing the border had its own complications. Only aircraft of the three Western Allies were allowed to fly to or from West Berlin; civilian traffic was principally served by Air France, British European Airways (later British Airways) and Pan Am. River traffic was hugely important to the survival of West Berlin, conveying around five million tons of cargo a year to the city, but was subjected to numerous inspections and petty restrictions by the East German authorities. Rail traffic was excruciatingly slow; locomotives and train crews had to be changed at the border, the East German Transport Police (Trapos) carried out inspections using sniffer dogs to uncover stowaways, passports and visas had to be processed at border stations and the condition of the track was so poor that trains were limited to a maximum speed of 70 kilometres per hour (43 miles per hour). Road crossings were fairly straightforward but slow because of the extensive border formalities and inspections. Drivers were required to stay on designated transit routes across East Germany.

== Crossing points ==
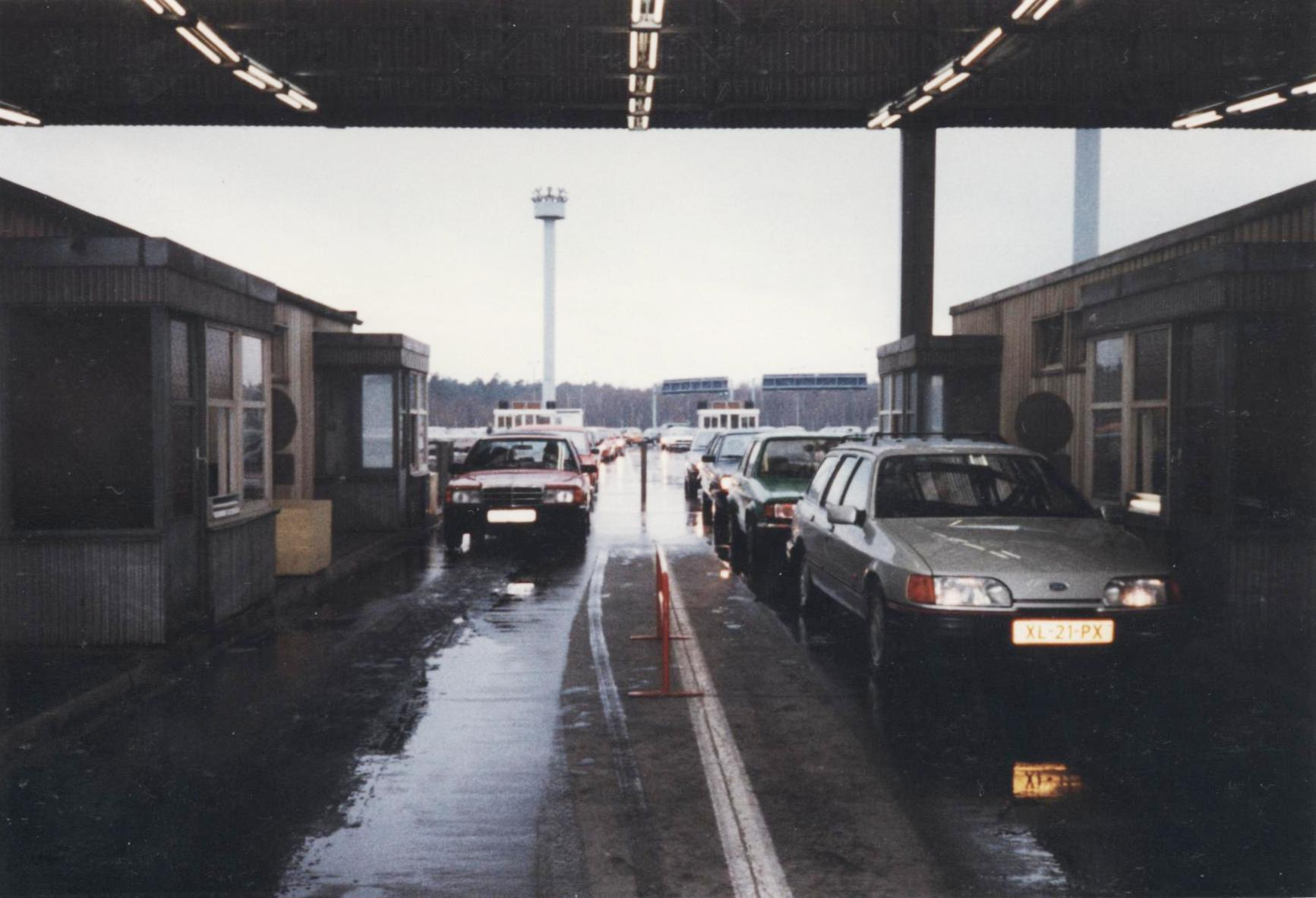
Vehicles queuing at the East German passport control at the Marienborn border crossing point, 1989

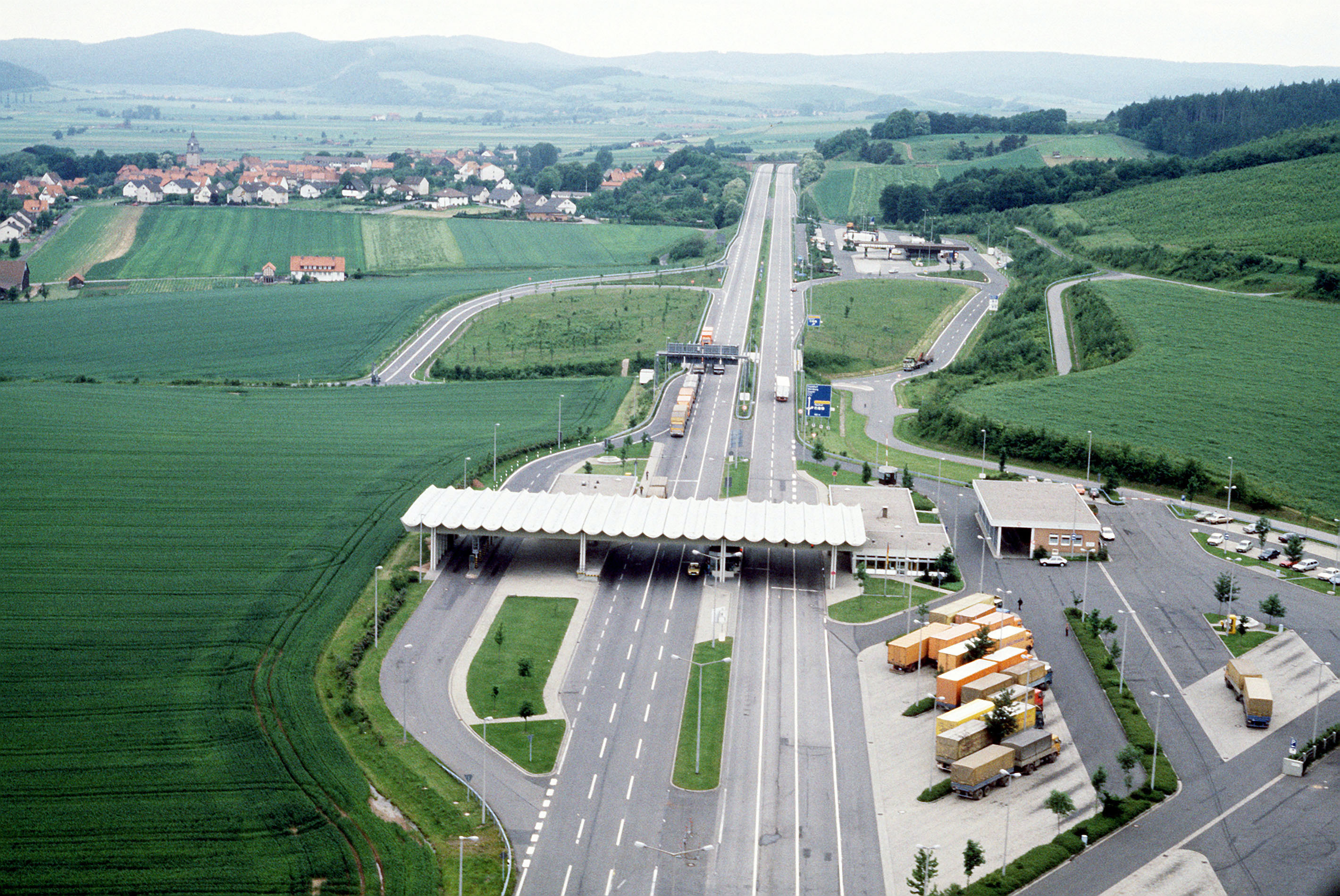
The West German border crossing facility at Herleshausen in 1985, looking west along Bundesautobahn 4

Before 1952, the inner German border could be crossed at almost any point along its length. The fortification of the border resulted in the severing of 32 railway lines, three autobahns, 31 main roads, eight primary roads, about 60 secondary roads and thousands of lanes and cart tracks. The number of crossing points was reduced to three air corridors, three road corridors, two railway lines and two river connections giving transit access to Berlin, plus a handful of additional crossing points for freight traffic. The situation improved somewhat after the rapprochement between the two German states in the 1970s. Additional border crossings for so-called kleine Grenzverkehr – "small border traffic", essentially for West German day trippers – were opened at various locations along the border.

=== The crossings ===
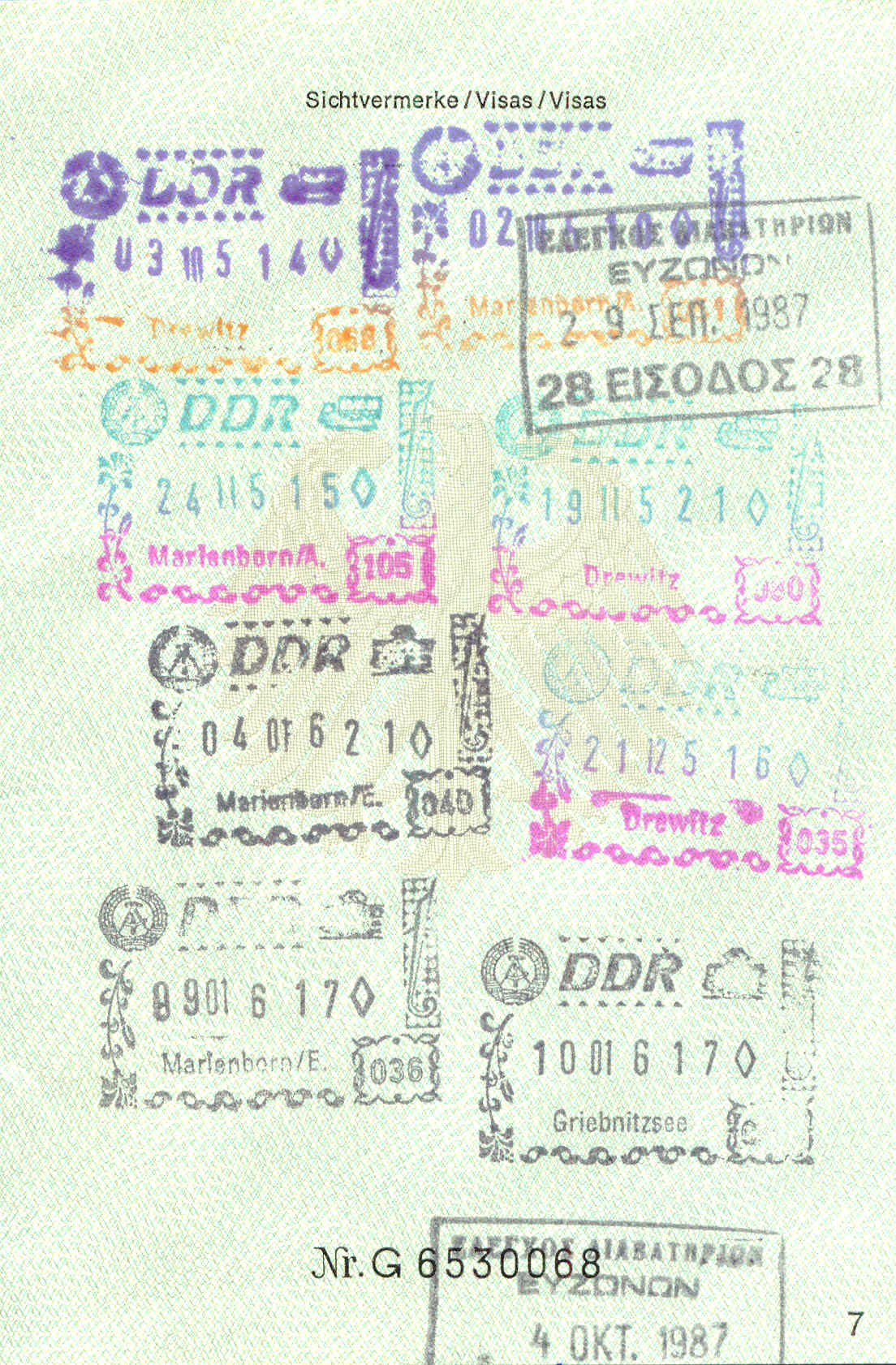
East German stamps from the Marienborn crossing.

By 1982, there were 19 border crossings: six roads, three autobahns, eight railway lines plus the Elbe river and the Mittellandkanal.

Road crossing (East/West checkpoints, from north to south)

- Selmsdorf/Schlutup
- Zarrentin/Gudow
  - Located on Bundesautobahn 24 between West Berlin and Hamburg.
- Horst/Lauenburg
- Salzwedel/Bergen
- Marienborn/Helmstedt
  - Largest crossing, on Bundesautobahn 2 between Hanover and West Berlin. Used as main transit checkpoint for those going to or coming from West Berlin.
- Worbis/Duderstadt
- Wartha/Herleshausen
- Meiningen/Eussenhausen
- Eisfeld/Rottenbach
- Hirschberg/Rudolphstein replacing the Juchöh/Töpen crossing point which was closed on December 19, 1966.

Railway crossing

- Herrnburg/Lübeck
- Schwanheide/Büchen
- Oebisfelde/Wolfsburg
- Marienborn/Helmstedt
- Ellrich/Walkenried
- Gerstungen/Bebra
- Probstzella/Ludwigsstadt
- Gutenfürst/Hof

Water crossing

- Cumlose/Schnackenburg
- Ruhen/Buchhorst

The largest crossing point or Grenzübergangsstelle (GÜSt) between East and West Germanies was at Marienborn on the Hanover–Berlin autobahn. It was originally a set of simple huts straddling the border, where British and Soviet military police checked travellers between the eastern and western zones. In 1971–72 the East German government expanded it into a 35 hectares (86 acres) complex through which 34.6 million travellers passed between 1985 and 1989. The British, French and Americans worked alongside the West German Bundesgrenzschutz and Customs to maintain a corresponding checkpoint near Helmstedt. Codenamed Checkpoint Alpha, this was the first of three Allied checkpoints on the road to Berlin. The others were Checkpoint Bravo, where the autobahn crossed from East Germany into West Berlin, and most famous of all, Checkpoint Charlie, the only place where non-Germans could cross by road or foot from West to East Berlin.

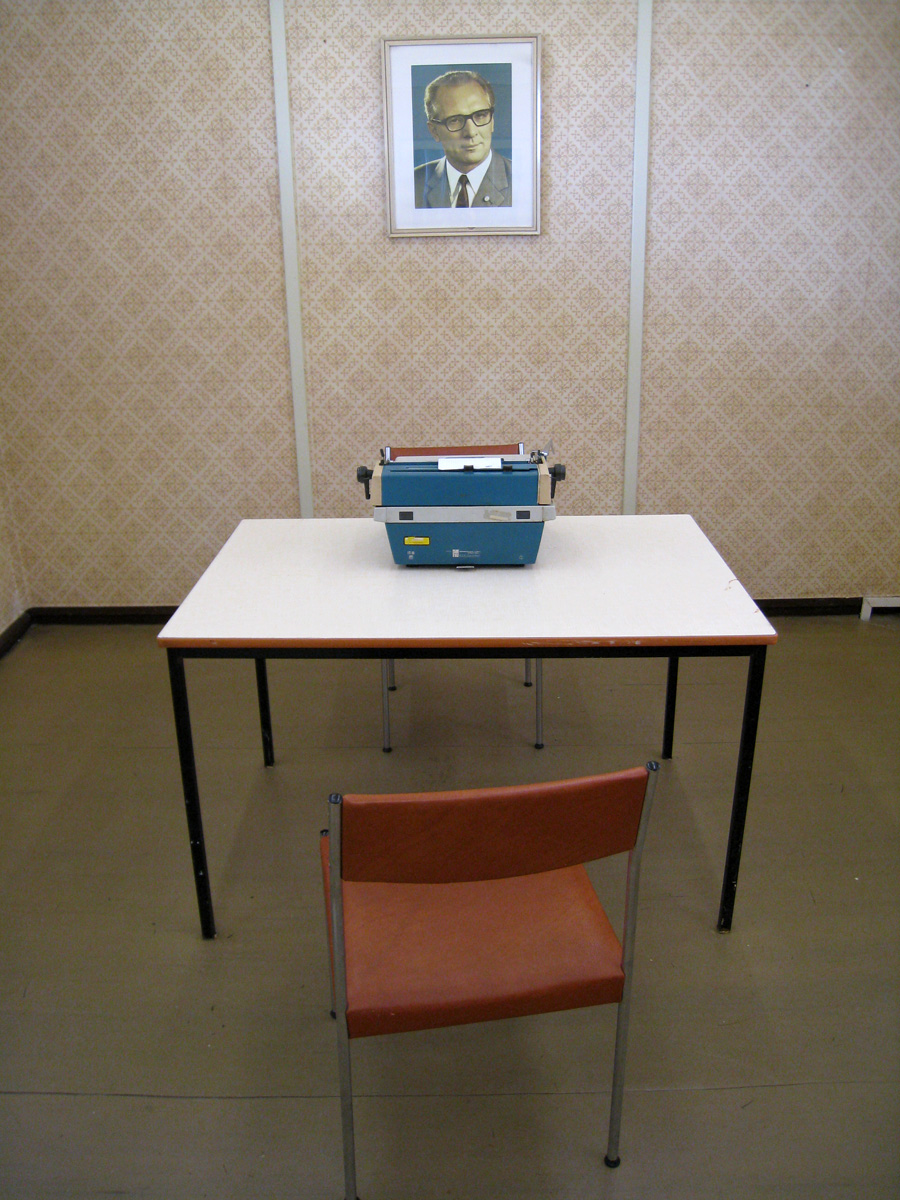
Stasi secret police officers interviewed travellers entering or leaving East Germany in this room, at the Marienborn border crossing point.

On the other side of the border at Marienborn, over 1,000 East German officials worked around the clock to process travellers. A large proportion of the staff were officers of the Stasi, the much-feared secret police, although they wore the uniforms of the regular Grenztruppen. The real Grenztruppen were also present to provide military backup, as were East German customs officers and Soviet military officials who were responsible for inspecting Allied military vehicles entering East Germany. The main functions of the staff at Marienborn and other border crossing points were to combat smuggling, to "defend the state border", and to stop any items deemed politically or socially unacceptable from entering or leaving the country. A wide variety of items were forbidden to be imported or exported. Western magazines and newspapers, recorded materials, films, radios and medicines were among the more predictable prohibited items, though it was unclear why items such as eels and asparagus could not be brought across the border.

The prevention of escapes was a key priority at crossing points such as Marienborn. It was not possible to simply drive through the gap in the border fence that existed at crossing points, as the East Germans installed high-impact vehicle barriers mounted at chest height. These could (and did) kill drivers who attempted to ram through them. As a last resort, massive rolling barriers (Kraftfahrzeugschnellsperre) 11 metres (36 ft) long and weighing six tons apiece could be catapulted across the carriageway using hydraulic rams. They were capable of stopping a 50-ton truck travelling at 80 kilometres per hour (50 mph). The guards at border crossings were, as elsewhere, authorised to use weapons to stop escape attempts.

Vehicles were subjected to rigorous checks to uncover escapees. Inspection pits and mirrors allowed the undersides of vehicles to be scrutinised. Probes were used to investigate the chassis and even the fuel tank, where an escapee might be concealed, and vehicles could be partially dismantled in on-site garages. At Marienborn there was even a mortuary garage where coffins could be checked to confirm that the occupants really were dead. From the late 1970s, East Germany also installed concealed gamma-ray detectors ("gamma guns") at border crossings which used radioactive caesium-137 sources to detect people concealed inside vehicles. The discovery of this practice caused a health scare after reunification. A subsequent investigation by federal authorities found that these involuntary screenings did not result in "a harmful dose" despite violating basic radiation safety protocols.

Passengers, too, were checked thoroughly with an inspection of their papers and frequently an interrogation about their travel plans and reasons for travelling. The system was slow and low-technology, relying largely on vast card indexes recording travellers' details, but it was effective nonetheless; during the 28 years of operation of the Marienborn complex, no successful escapes were recorded.

== Border crossing regulations ==
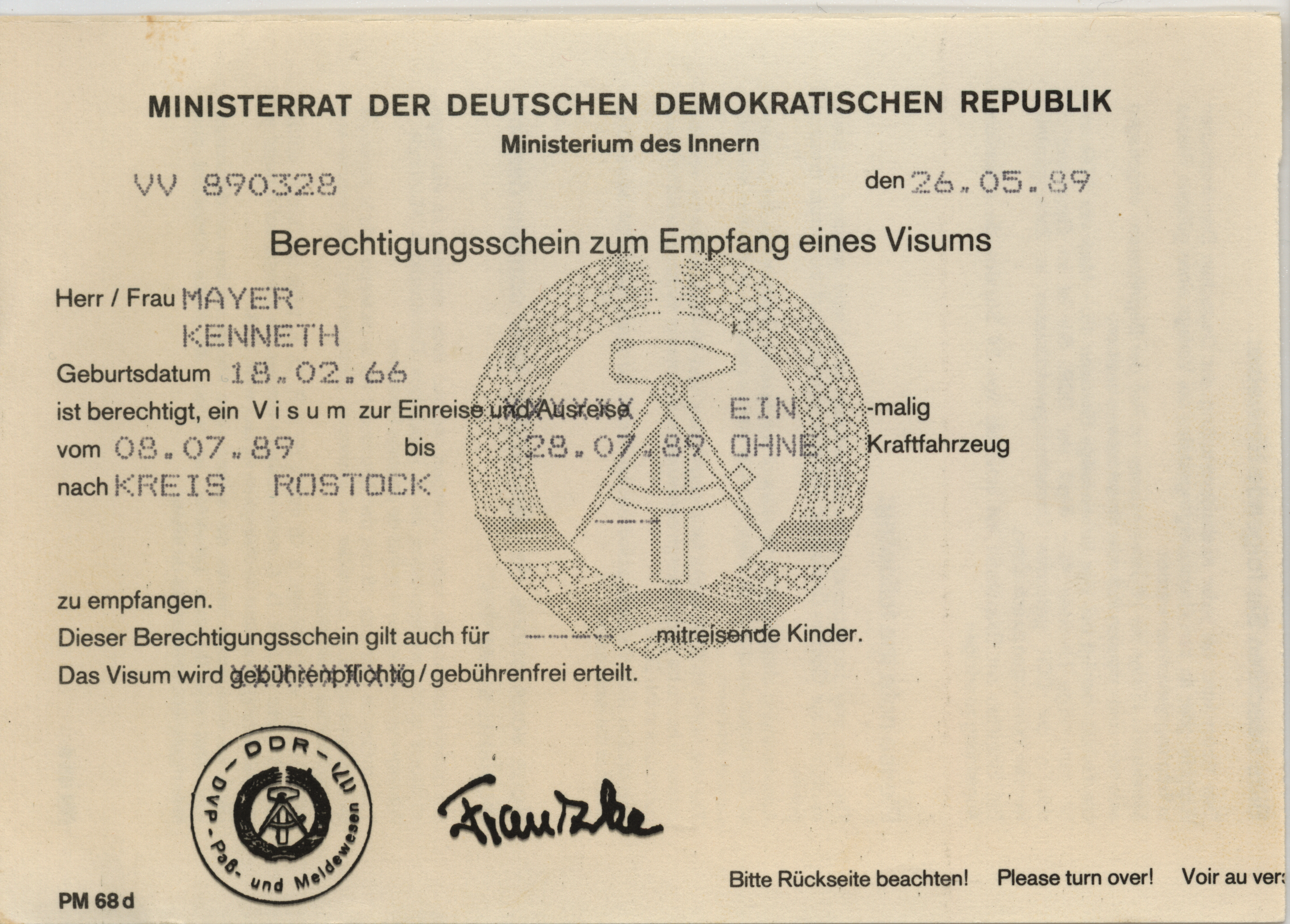
A visa to enter the GDR, May 1989

West and East Germans were treated very differently when entering or leaving East Germany. West Germans were able to cross the border relatively freely to visit relatives, though they had to go through numerous bureaucratic formalities imposed by the East German government. These included applying in advance for permission, registering with the local police on arrival, remaining within a specified area for a specified period and obtaining an exit visa from the police on departure.

East Germans were subjected to far more stringent restrictions. The East German constitution of 1949 granted citizens a theoretical right to leave the country, though it was hardly respected in practice. Even this limited right was removed in the constitution of 1968 which confined citizens' freedom of movement to the area within the state borders. It was not until November 1964 that they were allowed to visit the West at all, and even then only pensioners were allowed. This gave rise to a joke that only in East Germany did people look forward to old age. East German pensioners were able to visit the West for up to four weeks in a year, but were not permitted to take more than a token 10 East German marks with them, requiring them to depend on the support of relatives, churches, and the West German government. As they were retired, they were seen by the East German government as economically unimportant and no great loss if they defected. The vast majority, though, chose to return home at the end of their stay.

Not until 1972 were younger East Germans permitted to travel to the West, though few did so until the mid-1980s. They were rarely permitted to take their own car but had to go by train or bus instead. A lengthy process had to be endured to register with the police for a passport and exit visa and to undergo close questioning about their reasons for wanting to travel. An application to travel had to be submitted well in advance of the planned departure. They also had to submit an application and undergo a personal evaluation at their workplace. Their employer would then submit a statement and various forms to the police. Applicants were left in the dark about the success of their application until the day before their departure. They were required to go again to the police and present various items of paperwork before obtaining a passport and visa, for which a 60 DM fee was charged – a substantial fraction of an East German's monthly salary.

The odds were against successful applications, as only around 40,000 a year were approved. Refusal was quite often arbitrary, depending on the goodwill of local officials. A few categories of citizens were permitted relatively free travel. Members of the Party elite and cultural ambassadors such as sportspeople, singers, film directors, and writers were frequently given permission to travel, as were essential transport workers such as barge crewmen, railway workers, and truck drivers. However, they were not permitted to take their families with them.

Until the late 1980s, ordinary East Germans were only permitted to travel to the West on "urgent family business" such as the marriage, serious illness, or death of a close relative. In February 1986, the regime relaxed the definition of "urgent family business", though it still required travellers to have a spouse, child, or other close relative remain within the country. This massively increased the number of citizens able to travel to the West. The number of legal East German border-crossers rose from 66,000 in 1985 to 573,000 in 1986, 1.2 million in 1987 and 2.2 million in 1988. The "pensioner traffic" increased greatly as well, from 1.6 million a year in 1985 to 3.8 million in 1987. And more than 99.5% of the border-crossers returned home. The relaxation of the border restrictions was said to have been motivated by a desire on the part of the East German leadership to reduce their citizens' desire to travel and shrink the number applying to emigrate. In practice, however, it had exactly the opposite effect. An April 1988 article in The Washington Post wondered prophetically whether the policy would lead to East Germany "fac[ing] the prospect that the freer travel policy could be destabilizing by whetting desires for additional liberties."

Even if East Germans got a visa to cross the border, they were still subject to East German government restrictions on the western side. Groups visiting West Germany were required to leave behind all of their identification, without which they could not prove their entitlement to West German citizenship. Individual members were forbidden from walking alone or collecting the 100 DM "welcome money" that the West German government gave to all East German visitors. The group as a whole was responsible for making sure none of its members defected. They could all expect punishment if someone did "take off". Such rules provided a powerful incentive to keep potential defectors in line.

Ordinary East Germans strongly resented the travel restrictions. Most holidays had to be spent at home or in state-run holiday resorts. Husbands and wives often had to take separate holidays because of the difficulty in getting approval for leave from employers. Those who could travel were only free to go to "fraternal Socialist states" – Bulgaria, Czechoslovakia, Hungary, Poland, Romania, and the Soviet Union (though Poland was taken off the list after 1981 to prevent the spread of the Solidarity trade unionism "infection"). Even then, they had to pay high prices to stay in second-class accommodation and were often shocked by the poor living conditions, particularly in the Soviet Union, which GDR propaganda had promoted as "the most modern and progressive state in the world."

== Emigrating from East Germany ==
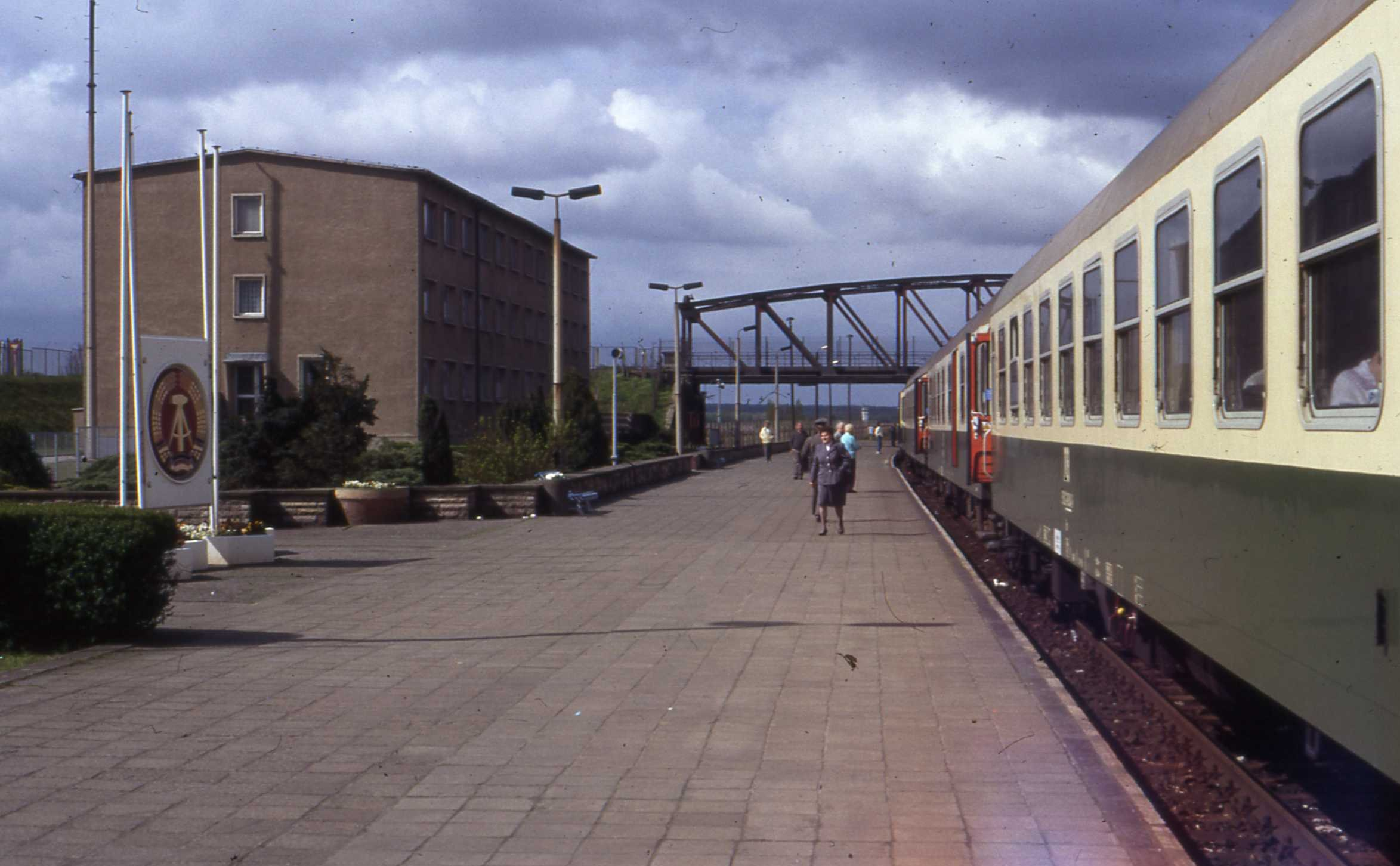
Crossing the border by rail at Oebisfelde railway station, April 1990

The GDR did not encourage emigration, perhaps not surprisingly considering that the inner German border fortifications and Berlin Wall had been erected specifically to prevent it. There was no formal legal basis under which a citizen could emigrate from the country. In 1975, however, East Germany signed up to the Helsinki Accords, a pan-European treaty to improve relations between the countries of Europe. The Accords were regarded by the East German government as being hugely important. GDR leader Erich Honecker commented that the Accords "fixed" the "territorial and political outcomes" of the Second World War, in effect ratifying the division of Germany.

However, the Accords also included a provision on freedom of movement that was to lead to the regime's authority being increasingly undermined. As East German citizens learned about this provision – which was not publicised by the GDR's state-controlled media – an increasing number sought to use it to emigrate. They applied for exit visas, citing Helsinki in their applications. The numbers were relatively small at first, averaging around 7,200 first-time applications and the granting of 4,600 exit visas annually during the late 1970s. By the late 1980s numbers had snowballed to over 100,000 applications with around 15,000–25,000 exit visas being granted annually. Legal emigration posed a dilemma for the regime; although it provided a safety valve of sorts and allowed East Germany to portray itself as adhering to the Helsinki norms, it ran the risk of the East German population coming to demand a general right to emigrate. A Central Committee report prepared in 1988 warned that even Party members were not sufficiently motivated to oppose emigration:

The necessary commitment to preventing attempts to emigrate is not yet present in many Party branches, workplaces and [FDGB] collectives, or amongst citizens. The required prevailing atmosphere of opposition to these phenomena has not yet been achieved. Even Party members, FDGB functionaries or brigade leaders sometimes state that they fail to understand why these citizens are not permitted to emigrate.

The regime sought to dissuade would-be émigrés through a variety of measures. The process of applying for an exit permit was deliberately intended to be slow, demeaning, and frustrating, with a low chance of success. Applicants were pushed to the margins of society. They were demoted or sacked from their jobs, excluded from universities, and subjected to ostracism. If the applicants were parents, they could face the threat of having their children taken into state custody on the grounds that they were unfit to bring up children. The heavily politicised East German law code was used to punish those who continued to apply for emigration despite repeated rejections. Those who repeatedly submitted emigration applications faced charges of "impeding ... the state and social activity". If they sought assistance from contacts in the West, such as relatives or West German state bodies, they were guilty of "illegal contact" or "traitorous information transfer or activities as an agent." Criticising the political system was a crime of "public disparagement". Over 10,000 applicants were arrested by the Stasi between the 1970s and 1989 on such charges.

Such repressive treatment may well have reduced the number of people who were willing to apply for an exit visa; however, it also provoked the creation of a small but vocal pro-reform movement willing to directly and publicly challenge the regime. The government found it difficult to deal with such people; as one historian comments, "the scale and spontaneity of demonstrative actions, and the obstinate commitment of the applicants, repeatedly forced the [East German] power apparatus to make concessions on travel and emigration issues in order to prevent ... massive, uncontrolled eruptions." This was to have important consequences at the end of the 1980s. A report for the Central Committee's security section noted: "The emigration problem is confronting us with a fundamental problem of the GDR's development. Experience shows that the current repertoire of solutions (improved travel possibilities, expatriation of applicants, etc.) have not brought the desired results, but rather the opposite." The agitation for emigration, the report concluded presciently, "threatens to undermine beliefs in the correctness of the Party's policies."

== Ransoms and "humanitarian releases" ==
In addition to the emigration programme, East German citizens could also emigrate through the semi-secret route of being ransomed to the West German government. Between 1964 and 1989, 33,755 political prisoners were ransomed. A further 2,087 prisoners were released to the West under an amnesty in 1972. Another 215,000 people, including 2,000 children cut off from their parents, were allowed to leave East Germany to rejoin their families. In exchange, West Germany paid over 3.4 billion DM – nearly $2.3 billion at 1990 prices – in goods and hard currency. The annual ransom fees became such a fixture, and so essential to the running of the East German economy, that the East German government accounted for the ransoms as a fixed item in the GDR's state budget. Those who were ransomed would be taken to a detention centre in Karl-Marx-Stadt (now Chemnitz) before being driven across the border in coaches and officially expelled by the GDR authorities.

As the two governments did not have any formal relations when the ransoms first began, they were arranged between two lawyers, East German Wolfgang Vogel and West German Jürgen Stange. The initially secret arrangement was revealed by Rainer Barzel, the Federal Minister for All-German Affairs at the time, who wrote in his memoirs (published in 1978): "The price for the prisoners was determined on an individual basis. It was fixed according to the prisoner's human and political weight. Those serving life sentences cost more." The prices ranged from around 1,875 DM for a worker to around 11,250 DM for a doctor; the justification, according to East Germany, was that this was compensation for the money invested by the state in the prisoner's training. For a while, payments were made in kind using goods that were in short supply in East Germany, such as oranges, bananas, coffee and medical drugs. The average prisoner was worth around 4,000 DM worth of goods. Ultimately the ransoms became simple cash payments, funded by a shadowy network of agencies and rich individuals that included the federal government, the Evangelical Lutheran Church and the fervently anti-communist millionaire publisher Axel Springer. The scheme was highly controversial in the West. It was denounced by many as human trafficking but was defended by others as an "act of pure humanitarianism".

== See also ==
- Border guards of the inner German border
- Escape attempts and victims of the inner German border
- Development of the inner German border
- Fortifications of the inner German border
