= Hanshagen, Nordwestmecklenburg =

Hanshagen
- Ortsteil of Upahl
- Interactive map of Hanshagen
- Location within Germany Location within Mecklenburg-Vorpommern
- Coordinates: 53°47′N 11°09′E
- Country: Germany
- State: Mecklenburg-Vorpommern
- District: Nordwestmecklenburg
- Municipality: Upahl

Area
  - Total: 12.29 km^{2} (4.75 sq mi)
- Elevation: 63 m (207 ft)

Population (2009-12-31)
  - Total: 391
  - Density: 31.8/km^{2} (82.4/sq mi)
- Time zone: UTC+01:00 (CET)
  - Summer (DST): UTC+02:00 (CEST)
- Postal codes: 23936
- Dialling codes: 038822
- Vehicle registration: NWM
- Website: www.grevesmuehlen.de

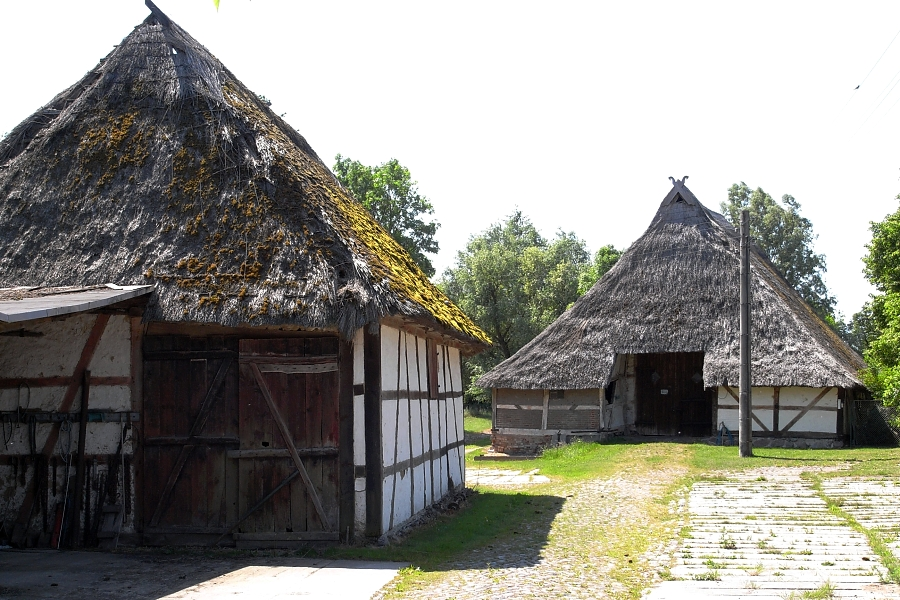
Traditional farmhouse in Sievershagen, Hanshagen, Germany.

Hanshagen is a village and a former municipality in the Nordwestmecklenburg district, in Mecklenburg-Vorpommern, Germany. Since 1 January 2011, it is part of the municipality Upahl.
