= Tino Schomann =

German politician (born 1987)

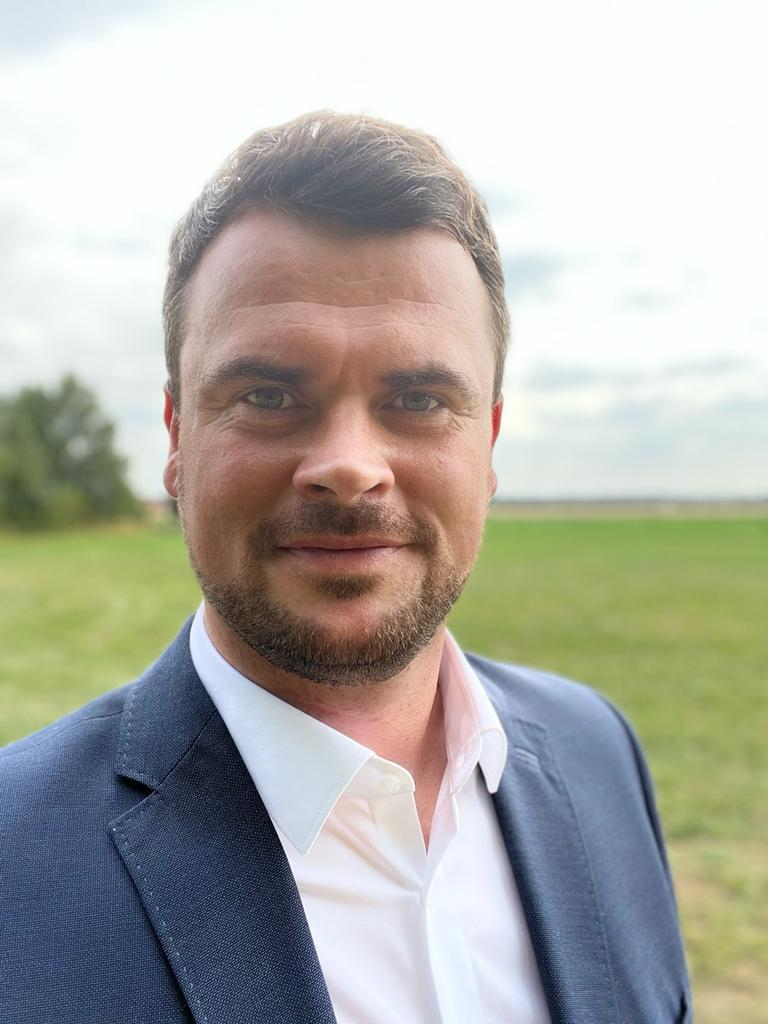
- Schomann in 2022

Landrat of Nordwestmecklenburg
- Incumbent
- Assumed office 9 July 2021
- Preceded by: Kerstin Weiss

Personal details
- Born: 27 September 1987 (age 39)
- Party: Christian Democratic Union (since 2010)

Tino Schomann (born 27 September 1987) is a German politician serving as Landrat of Nordwestmecklenburg since 2021. He has served as a deputy chairman of the Christian Democratic Union in Mecklenburg-Vorpommern since 2024. From 2019 to 2021, he was a district councillor of Nordwestmecklenburg. From 2014 to 2021, he served as mayor of Blowatz.
