= Vitense =

- Ortsteil of Rehna
- Interactive map of Vitense
- Location within Germany Location within Mecklenburg-Vorpommern
- Coordinates: 53°49′N 11°03′E
- Country: Germany
- State: Mecklenburg-Vorpommern
- District: Nordwestmecklenburg
- Town: Rehna

Area
  - Total: 13.16 km^{2} (5.08 sq mi)
- Elevation: 29 m (95 ft)

Population (2012-12-31)
  - Total: 308
  - Density: 23.4/km^{2} (60.6/sq mi)
- Time zone: UTC+01:00 (CET)
  - Summer (DST): UTC+02:00 (CEST)
- Postal codes: 19217
- Dialling codes: 038872
- Vehicle registration: NWM

Vitense is a village and a former municipality in the Nordwestmecklenburg district, in Mecklenburg-Vorpommern, Germany. Since 25 May 2014, it is part of the town Rehna.
