= Nesow =

- Ortsteil of Rehna
- Interactive map of Nesow
- Location within Germany Location within Mecklenburg-Vorpommern
- Coordinates: 53°45′N 11°03′E
- Country: Germany
- State: Mecklenburg-Vorpommern
- District: Nordwestmecklenburg
- Town: Rehna

Area
  - Total: 8.61 km^{2} (3.32 sq mi)
- Elevation: 24 m (79 ft)

Population (2012-12-31)
  - Total: 239
  - Density: 27.8/km^{2} (71.9/sq mi)
- Time zone: UTC+01:00 (CET)
  - Summer (DST): UTC+02:00 (CEST)
- Postal codes: 19217
- Dialling codes: 038872
- Vehicle registration: NWM

Nesow is a village and a former municipality in the Nordwestmecklenburg district, in Mecklenburg-Vorpommern, Germany. Since 25 May 2014, it is part of the town Rehna.
