= Jakob Christoph Rudolf Eckermann =

German academic theologian and author

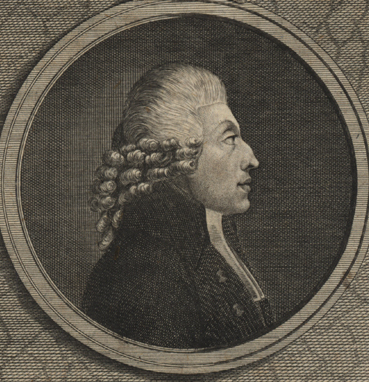
Portrait of Jakob Christoph Rudolf Eckermann

Jakob Christoph Rudolf Eckermann (6 September 1754, Wedendorf – 6 May 1837, Kiel) was a German academic theologian and author who served for 55 years at Kiel University.

== Background ==
Eckermann was born on 6 September 1754 at Wedendorf, in Mecklenburg-Schwerin. In 1782 he was appointed professor of theology at the University of Kiel, and Danish Church councillor. He died on 6 May 1836. He is the author of Erklarung aller dunklen Stellen des N.T. (Kiel, 1806–1808, 3 volumes, 8vo): – Joel metrisch ubersetzt mit einer neuen Erklarung (Lub. and Leipz. 1786, 8vo): – Compend. theol. theor. bibl. histor. (Altona, 1792, 8vo); a German edition of the same work, Handb. fur das systemat. Studium der Glaubenslehre, in which he declares that the doctrines of Jesus are only a popular guide to a real adoration of the deity, and that whatever else the New Testament may contain is to be considered true only from an historical point of view (Altona, 1801–2, 4 volumes, 8vo): – Erinnerung an den unvergangl. u. unschatzb. grossen Werth den Reformat. Luthers (Altona, 1817, 8vo), besides a number of other works, which have been collected in 6 volumes, 8vo, under the title of Theologische Beitrage (Altona, 1790–99), and in two additional vols., Vermischte Schriften (ibid. 1799, 1800). – Winer, Theologische Literatur; Kitto, Cyclopaedies, 1:725; Griasse, Allgem. Literargeschichte, 7:872.

== Academics ==
Eckermann served at Eutin school from 1775 to 1782, when he was appointed to full professor at Kiel. The area of his academic lectures was extraordinarily wide and much like especially during the time of its undiminished effectiveness; an emphatic proof then that share of the work was as low, which has nowadays, like all professions, including on the science itself asserted. In addition to Exegetical, repeated to the Theil lectures on almost all the books of the Old and New Testaments Eckermann about grammar, Hebrew, Syriac, and Arabic language, on dogmatic theology, church history, and Christian morals las homiletics, catechesis, but also, at least some times, via Greek and Latin writers, such as about the Platonic dialogues on Pindar and Livy.

During his time in Kiel he concentrated his writing in the theological direction. The emphasis falls on the six volumes of theological contributions published in the years 1790–99, as well as on the "Compendium theologiae christianae theoreticae biblio-historicae" (1791 and 1792-Second Edition).

Eckermann was a friend of grammatical historical interpretation; in exegesis his style was not free from prolixity and repetition. An unambiguous and yet modest language and his discretion was praised after criticism on the one hand the aforementioned compendium, on the other hand were condemned but also the misguided principles in distinction from the teachings of Jesus and the Apostles of the Jewish tradition.

His comprehensive volume 3 "manual for the systematic study of the Christian doctrine of the faith" (1801 & 1802) was the various reviews which only agree together, that no epoch-making meaning singular work. Also the pieces written during the Eutin resumed in the "collection of small mixed writings" (1799) in addition to individual recent work of educational and moral and theological content. In the first decade of this century, the three volumes of his "Declaration of all obscure passages of the new testament" fall (1806–8). With increasing age, his literary activity was reduced, but he dedicated a Latin memorial to Luther's merits.
