= Plüschow =

- Ortsteil of Upahl
- Interactive map of Plüschow
- Location within Germany Location within Mecklenburg-Vorpommern
- Coordinates: 53°49′N 11°16′E
- Country: Germany
- State: Mecklenburg-Vorpommern
- District: Nordwestmecklenburg
- Municipality: Upahl

Area
  - Total: 19.83 km^{2} (7.66 sq mi)
- Elevation: 34 m (112 ft)

Population (2017-12-31)
  - Total: 484
  - Density: 24.4/km^{2} (63.2/sq mi)
- Time zone: UTC+01:00 (CET)
  - Summer (DST): UTC+02:00 (CEST)
- Postal codes: 23936
- Dialling codes: 03841
- Vehicle registration: NWM

Plüschow is a village and a former municipality in the Nordwestmecklenburg district, in Mecklenburg-Vorpommern, Germany. Since January 2019, it is part of the municipality Upahl.
