= Köchelstorf =

- Ortsteil of Wedendorfersee
- Interactive map of Köchelstorf
- Location within Germany Location within Mecklenburg-Vorpommern
- Coordinates: 53°46′N 11°05′E
- Country: Germany
- State: Mecklenburg-Vorpommern
- District: Nordwestmecklenburg
- Municipality: Wedendorfersee

Area
  - Total: 13.58 km^{2} (5.24 sq mi)
- Elevation: 49 m (161 ft)

Population (2009-12-31)
  - Total: 394
  - Density: 29.0/km^{2} (75.1/sq mi)
- Time zone: UTC+01:00 (CET)
  - Summer (DST): UTC+02:00 (CEST)
- Postal codes: 19217
- Dialling codes: 038872
- Vehicle registration: NWM

Köchelstorf is a village and a former municipality in the Nordwestmecklenburg district, in Mecklenburg-Vorpommern, Germany. Since 1 July 2011, it is part of the municipality Wedendorfersee.
