= Börzow =

- Ortsteil of Stepenitztal
- Interactive map of Börzow
- Location within Germany Location within Mecklenburg-Vorpommern
- Coordinates: 53°51′N 11°07′E
- Country: Germany
- State: Mecklenburg-Vorpommern
- District: Nordwestmecklenburg
- Municipality: Stepenitztal

Area
  - Total: 17.44 km^{2} (6.73 sq mi)
- Elevation: 12 m (39 ft)

Population (2012-12-31)
  - Total: 694
  - Density: 39.8/km^{2} (103/sq mi)
- Time zone: UTC+01:00 (CET)
  - Summer (DST): UTC+02:00 (CEST)
- Postal codes: 23936
- Dialling codes: 03881
- Vehicle registration: NWM
- Website: www.grevesmuehlen.de

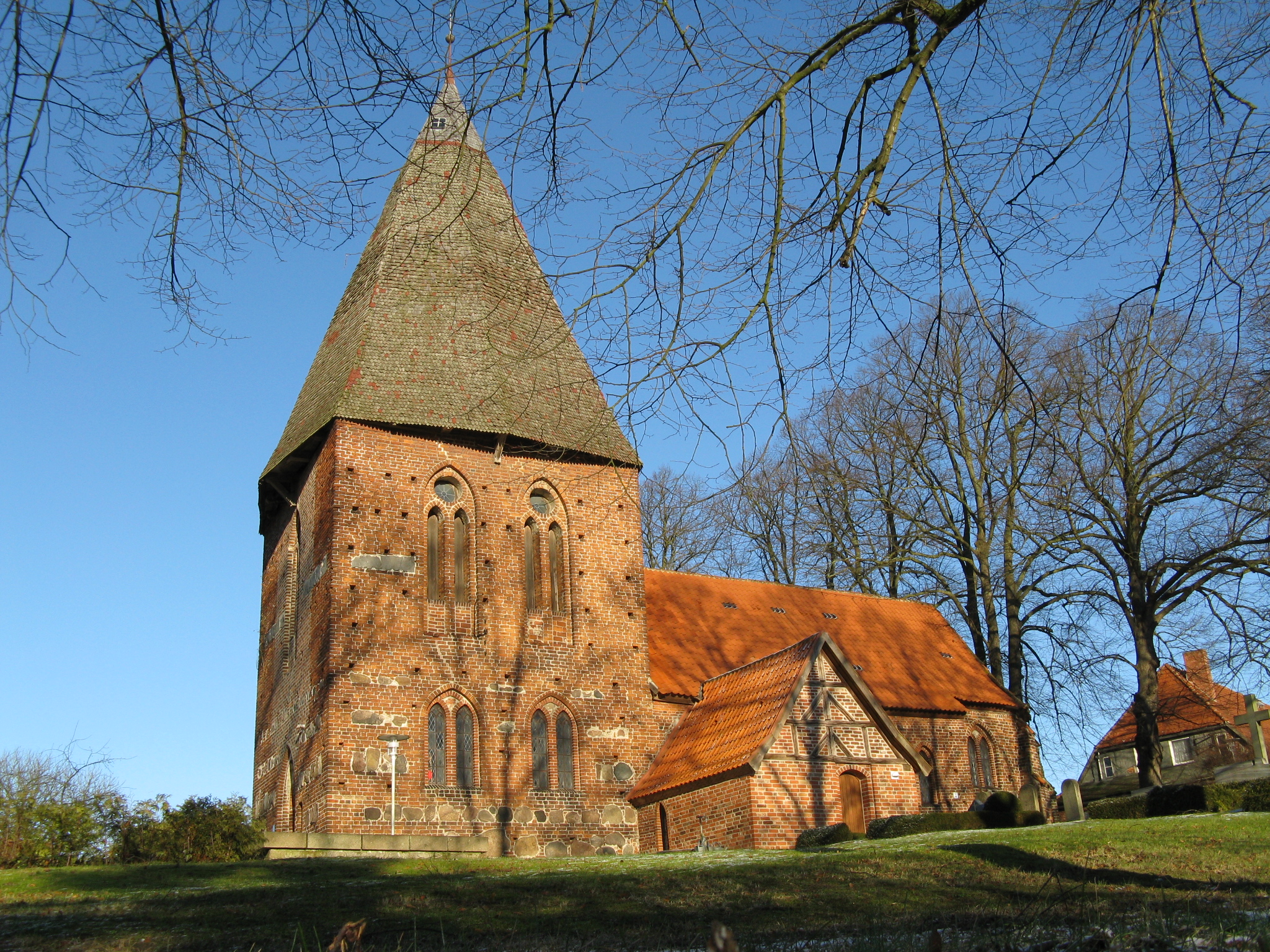
A church in Börzow, Mecklenburg-Vorpommern, Germany

Börzow is a village and a former municipality in the Nordwestmecklenburg district, in Mecklenburg-Vorpommern, Germany. Since 25 May 2014, it is part of the municipality Stepenitztal.
