= Schönberger Land =

- Amt
- Map of Nordwestmecklenburg highlighting Schönberger Land
- Interactive map of Schönberger Land
- Location within Germany Location within Mecklenburg-Vorpommern
- Coordinates: 53°51′N 10°55′E
- Country: Germany
- State: Mecklenburg-Vorpommern
- District: Nordwestmecklenburg
- Seat: Schönberg
- Subdivisions: 8 municipalities

Area
  - Total: 263.14 km^{2} (101.60 sq mi)

Population (2025-12-31)
  - Total: 17,667
  - Density: 67.139/km^{2} (173.89/sq mi)
- Time zone: UTC+01:00 (CET)
  - Summer (DST): UTC+02:00 (CEST)
- Website: www.schoenberger-land.de

Schönberger Land is an Amt in the district of Nordwestmecklenburg, in Mecklenburg-Vorpommern, Germany. The seat of the Amt is in Schönberg, with a branch office in Selmsdorf.

As of 2025, the Amt had nearly 18,000 inhabitants. It is close to the cities of Lübeck, Wismar and Schwerin and is part of the Hamburg Metropolitan Region.

The Amt Schönberger Land consists of the following municipalities:

- Dassow
- Grieben
- Lüdersdorf
- Menzendorf
- Roduchelstorf
- Schönberg
- Selmsdorf
- Siemz-Niendorf
