= Wedendorf =

Village in Mecklenburg-Vorpommern, Germany

- Ortsteil of Wedendorfersee
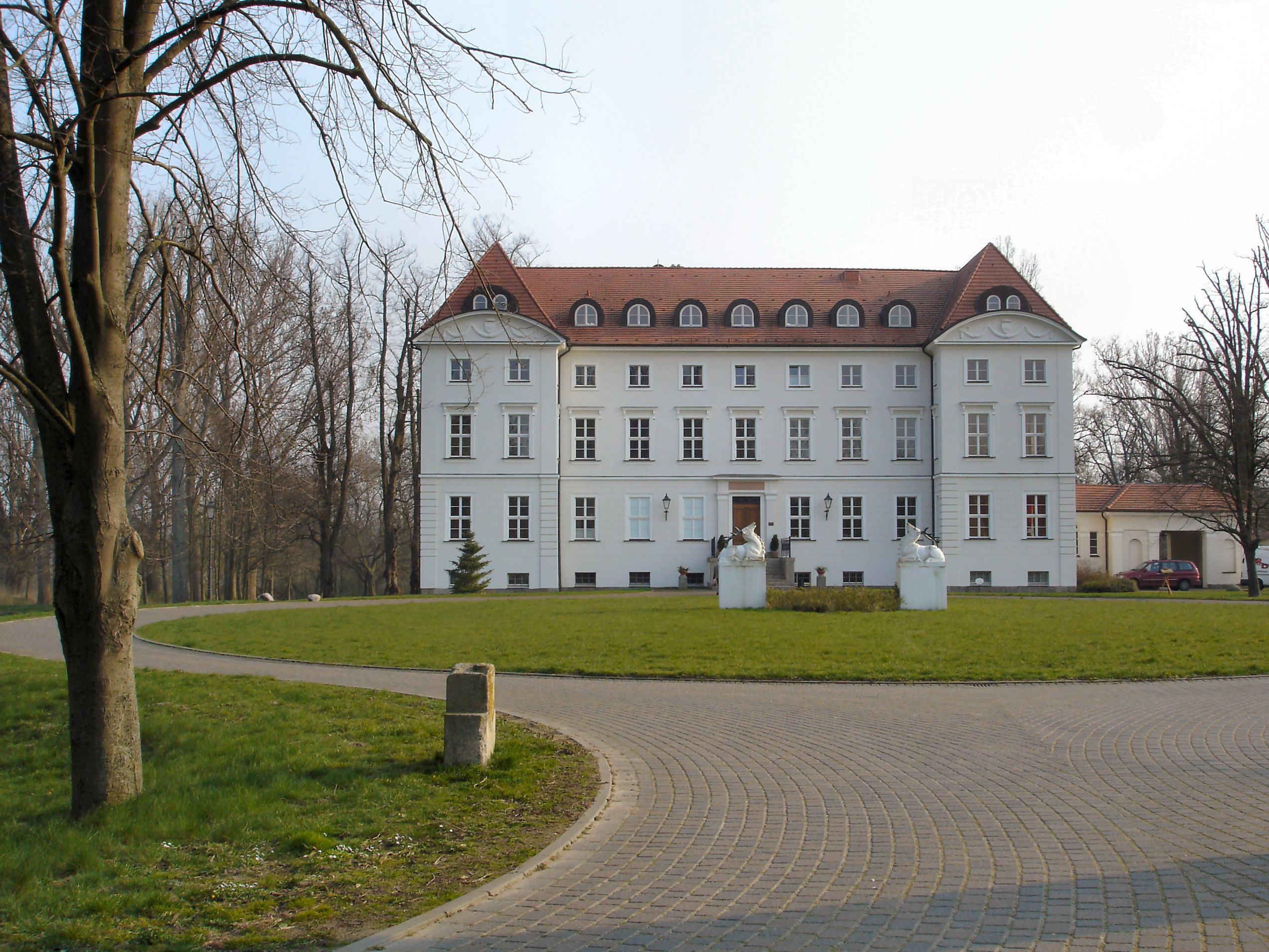
- A castle in Wedendorf
- Interactive map of Wedendorf
- Location within Germany Location within Mecklenburg-Vorpommern
- Coordinates: 53°46′N 11°07′E
- Country: Germany
- State: Mecklenburg-Vorpommern
- District: Nordwestmecklenburg
- Municipality: Wedendorfersee

Area
  - Total: 11.30 km^{2} (4.36 sq mi)
- Elevation: 54 m (177 ft)

Population (2009-12-31)
  - Total: 290
  - Density: 26/km^{2} (66/sq mi)
- Time zone: UTC+01:00 (CET)
  - Summer (DST): UTC+02:00 (CEST)
- Postal codes: 19217
- Dialling codes: 038872
- Vehicle registration: NWM
- Website: www.rehna.de

Wedendorf is a village and a former municipality in the Nordwestmecklenburg district, in Mecklenburg-Vorpommern, Germany. Since 1 July 2011, it is part of the municipality Wedendorfersee.
