= Holdorf, Mecklenburg-Vorpommern =

Holdorf
- Municipality
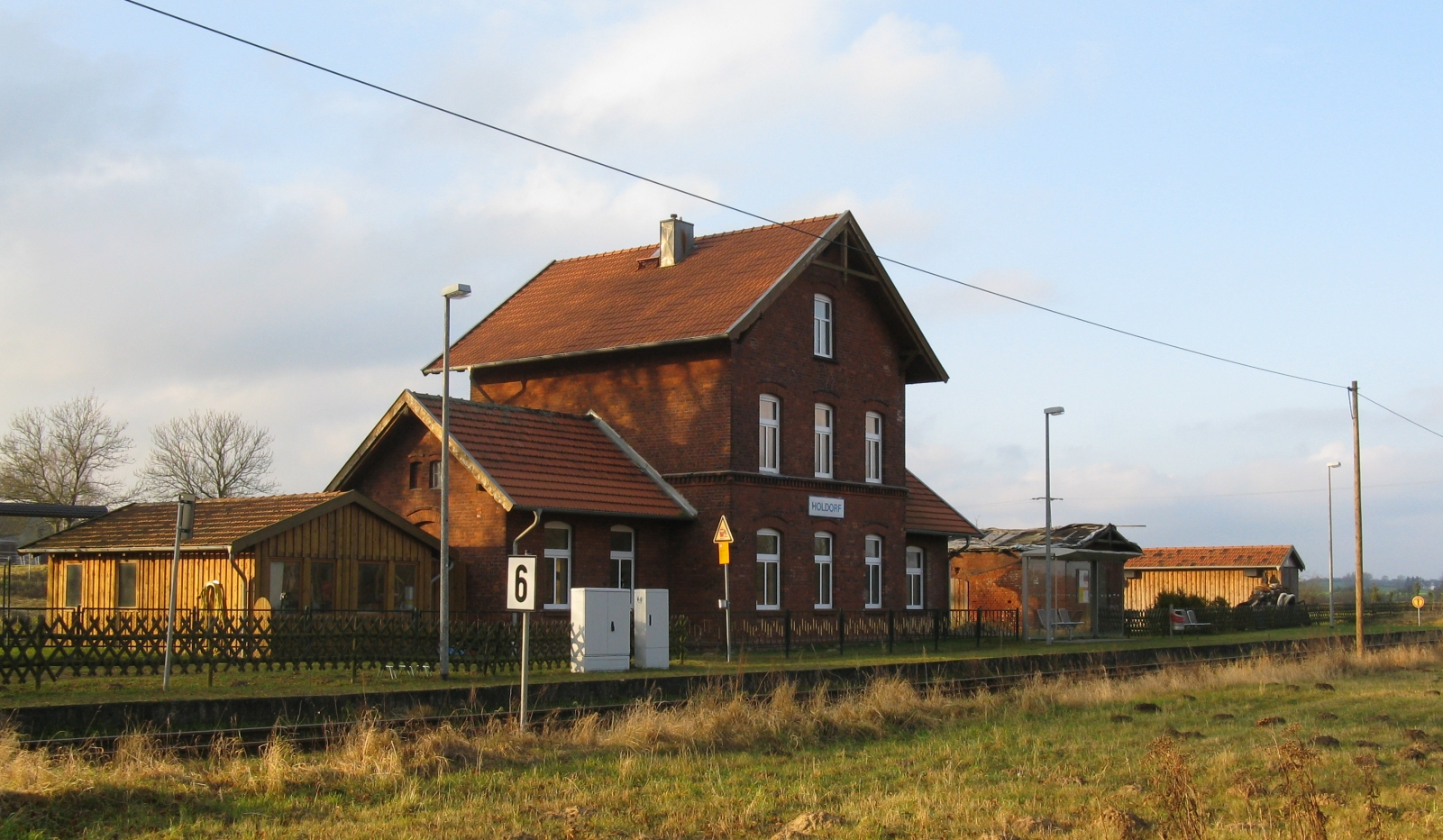
- Train station in Holdorf

- Location of Holdorf within Nordwestmecklenburg district
- Interactive map of Holdorf
- Location within Germany Location within Mecklenburg-Vorpommern
- Coordinates: 53°43′N 11°04′E
- Country: Germany
- State: Mecklenburg-Vorpommern
- District: Nordwestmecklenburg
- Municipal assoc.: Rehna

Government
  - Mayor: Peter Praeger

Area
  - Total: 13.53 km^{2} (5.22 sq mi)
- Elevation: 39 m (128 ft)

Population (2025-12-31)
  - Total: 404
  - Density: 29.9/km^{2} (77.3/sq mi)
- Time zone: UTC+01:00 (CET)
  - Summer (DST): UTC+02:00 (CEST)
- Postal codes: 19217
- Dialling codes: 03886
- Vehicle registration: NWM

Holdorf is a municipality in the Nordwestmecklenburg district, in Mecklenburg-Vorpommern, Germany.
