= Dechow =

- Municipality
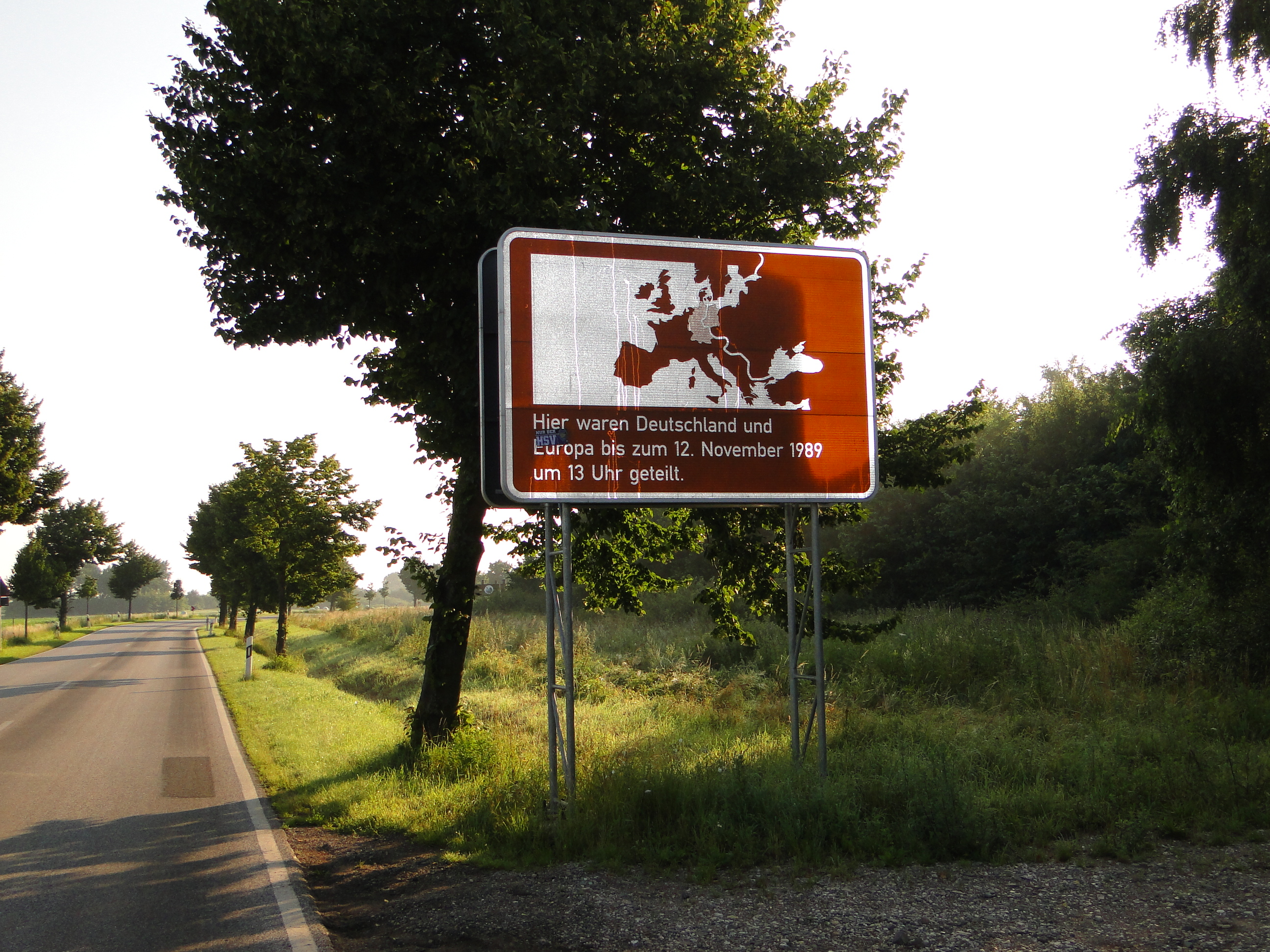
- Sign in Dechow marking the former border between East and West Germany

- Location of Dechow within Nordwestmecklenburg district
- Interactive map of Dechow
- Location within Germany Location within Mecklenburg-Vorpommern
- Coordinates: 53°43′N 10°55′E
- Country: Germany
- State: Mecklenburg-Vorpommern
- District: Nordwestmecklenburg
- Municipal assoc.: Rehna

Government
  - Mayor: Udo Wachtel

Area
  - Total: 15.14 km^{2} (5.85 sq mi)
- Elevation: 44 m (144 ft)

Population (2025-12-31)
  - Total: 184
  - Density: 12.2/km^{2} (31.5/sq mi)
- Time zone: UTC+01:00 (CET)
  - Summer (DST): UTC+02:00 (CEST)
- Postal codes: 19217
- Dialling codes: 038873
- Vehicle registration: NWM

Dechow (German pronunciation: [ˈdeːçoː]) is a municipality in the Nordwestmecklenburg district, in Mecklenburg-Vorpommern, Germany.
