= Grieben, Mecklenburg-Vorpommern =

Grieben
- Municipality
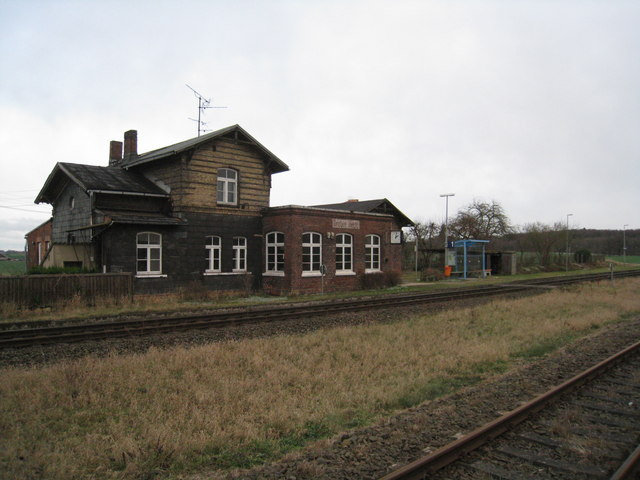
- Train station in Grieben

- Location of Grieben within Nordwestmecklenburg district
- Interactive map of Grieben
- Location within Germany Location within Mecklenburg-Vorpommern
- Coordinates: 53°49′N 11°03′E
- Country: Germany
- State: Mecklenburg-Vorpommern
- District: Nordwestmecklenburg
- Municipal assoc.: Schönberger Land

Government
  - Mayor: Frank Lenschow

Area
  - Total: 6.21 km^{2} (2.40 sq mi)
- Elevation: 16 m (52 ft)

Population (2025-12-31)
  - Total: 156
  - Density: 25.1/km^{2} (65.1/sq mi)
- Time zone: UTC+01:00 (CET)
  - Summer (DST): UTC+02:00 (CEST)
- Postal codes: 23936
- Dialling codes: 038828
- Vehicle registration: NWM
- Website: www.schoenberg-land.de

Grieben is a municipality in the Nordwestmecklenburg district, in Mecklenburg-Vorpommern, Germany.
