= Papenhusen =

- Ortsteil of Stepenitztal
- Interactive map of Papenhusen
- Location within Germany Location within Mecklenburg-Vorpommern
- Coordinates: 53°53′N 11°04′E
- Country: Germany
- State: Mecklenburg-Vorpommern
- District: Nordwestmecklenburg
- Municipality: Stepenitztal

Area
  - Total: 13.83 km^{2} (5.34 sq mi)
- Elevation: 16 m (52 ft)

Population (2012-12-31)
  - Total: 330
  - Density: 24/km^{2} (62/sq mi)
- Time zone: UTC+01:00 (CET)
  - Summer (DST): UTC+02:00 (CEST)
- Postal codes: 23923
- Dialling codes: 038824
- Vehicle registration: NWM
- Website: www.schoenberg-land.de

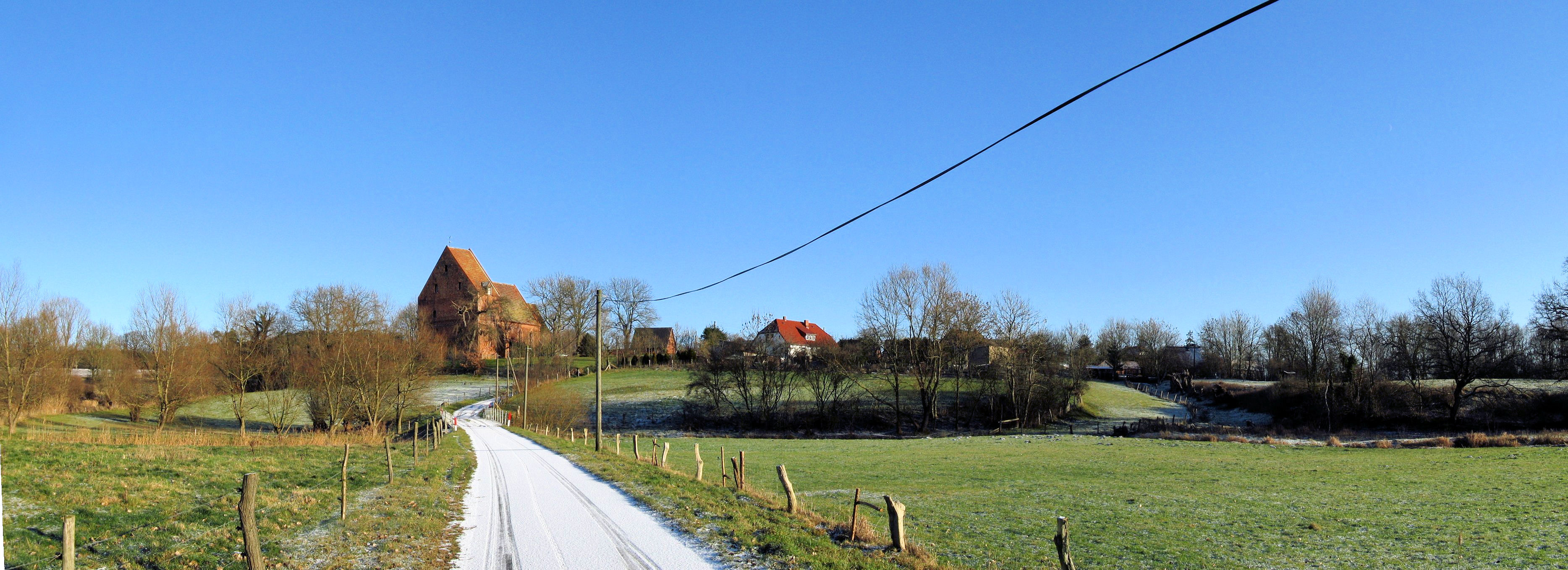
Mummendorf Church and countryside, Mecklenburg-Vorpommern, Germany

Papenhusen is a village and a former municipality in the Nordwestmecklenburg district, in Mecklenburg-Vorpommern, Germany. Since 25 May 2014, it is part of the municipality Stepenitztal.
