= Wedendorfersee =

- Municipality
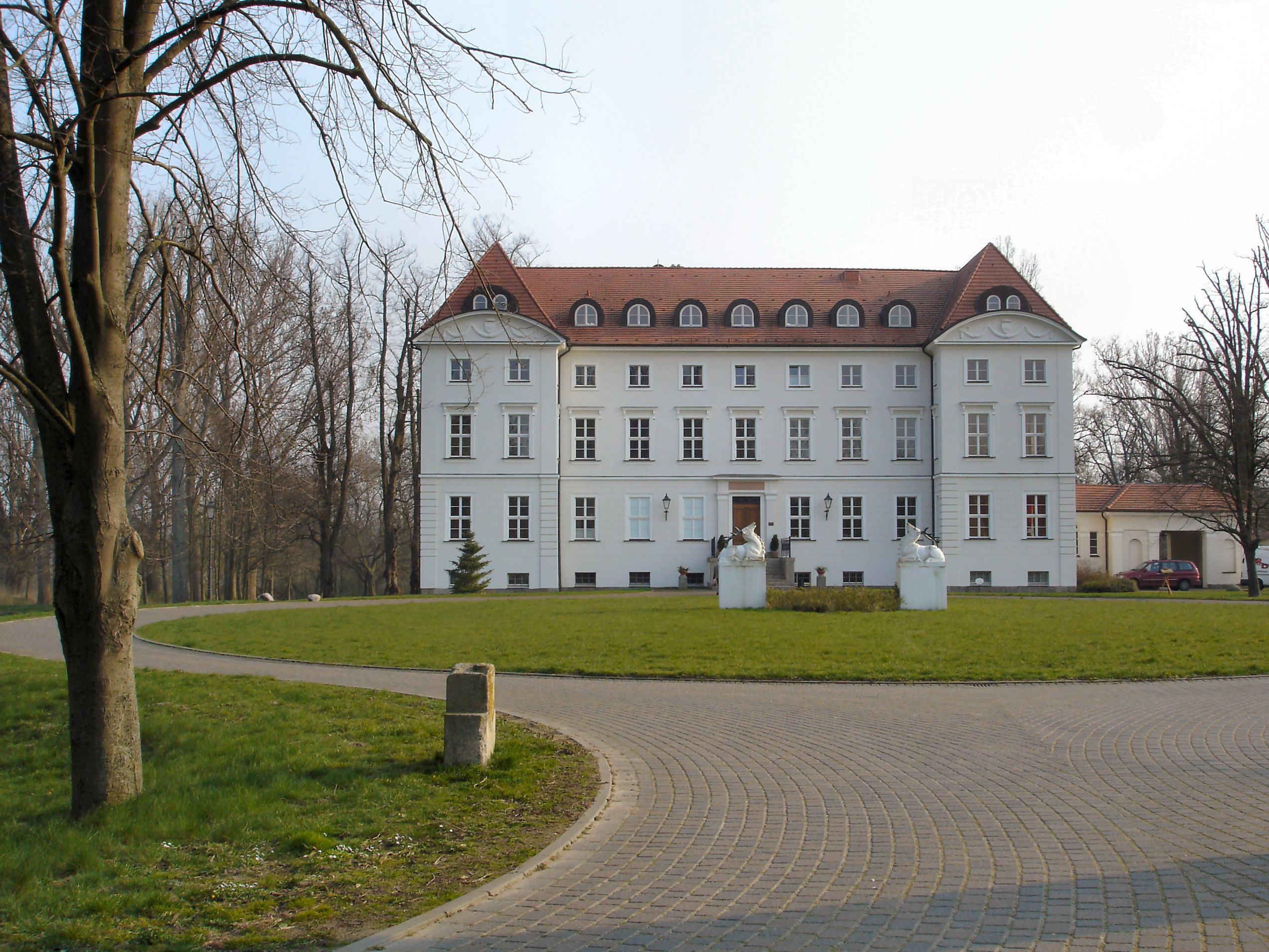
- Schloss Wedendorf in Wedendorfersee

- Location of Wedendorfersee within Nordwestmecklenburg district
- Interactive map of Wedendorfersee
- Location within Germany Location within Mecklenburg-Vorpommern
- Coordinates: 53°46′N 11°07′E
- Country: Germany
- State: Mecklenburg-Vorpommern
- District: Nordwestmecklenburg
- Municipal assoc.: Rehna

Area
  - Total: 24.88 km^{2} (9.61 sq mi)
- Elevation: 54 m (177 ft)

Population (2025-12-31)
  - Total: 689
  - Density: 27.7/km^{2} (71.7/sq mi)
- Time zone: UTC+01:00 (CET)
  - Summer (DST): UTC+02:00 (CEST)
- Postal codes: 19217
- Dialling codes: 038872
- Vehicle registration: NWM
- Website: www.rehna.de

Wedendorfersee is a municipality in the Nordwestmecklenburg district, in Mecklenburg-Vorpommern, Germany. It was formed on 1 July 2011 by the merger of the former municipalities Köchelstorf and Wedendorf.
