= Rehna (Amt) =

Amt in Mecklenburg-Vorpommern, Germany

- Amt
- Map of Nordwestmecklenburg highlighting Rehna
- Interactive map of Rehna
- Location within Germany Location within Mecklenburg-Vorpommern
- Coordinates: 53°46′N 10°55′E
- Country: Germany
- State: Mecklenburg-Vorpommern
- District: Nordwestmecklenburg
- Seat: Rehna
- Subdivisions: 11 municipalities

Area
  - Total: 222.04 km^{2} (85.73 sq mi)

Population (2025-12-31)
  - Total: 9,571
  - Density: 43.10/km^{2} (111.6/sq mi)
- Time zone: UTC+01:00 (CET)
  - Summer (DST): UTC+02:00 (CEST)
- Website: www.rehna.de

Rehna is an Amt in the district of Nordwestmecklenburg, in Mecklenburg-Vorpommern, Germany. The seat of the Amt is in Rehna.

The Amt Rehna consists of the following municipalities:

1. Carlow
2. Dechow
3. Groß Molzahn
4. Holdorf
5. Königsfeld
6. Rehna
7. Rieps
8. Schlagsdorf
9. Thandorf
10. Utecht
11. Wedendorfersee
