= Groß Molzahn =

- Municipality
- Location of Groß Molzahn within Nordwestmecklenburg district
- Interactive map of Groß Molzahn
- Location within Germany Location within Mecklenburg-Vorpommern
- Coordinates: 53°43′N 10°52′E
- Country: Germany
- State: Mecklenburg-Vorpommern
- District: Nordwestmecklenburg
- Municipal assoc.: Rehna

Government
  - Mayor: Rosemarie Melchin

Area
  - Total: 6.37 km^{2} (2.46 sq mi)
- Elevation: 48 m (157 ft)

Population (2025-12-31)
  - Total: 410
  - Density: 64/km^{2} (170/sq mi)
- Time zone: UTC+01:00 (CET)
  - Summer (DST): UTC+02:00 (CEST)
- Postal codes: 19217
- Dialling codes: 038875
- Vehicle registration: NWM

Groß Molzahn is a municipality in the Nordwestmecklenburg district, in Mecklenburg-Vorpommern, Germany.
