= Bibowsee =

Lake in Mecklenburg-Vorpommern, Germany

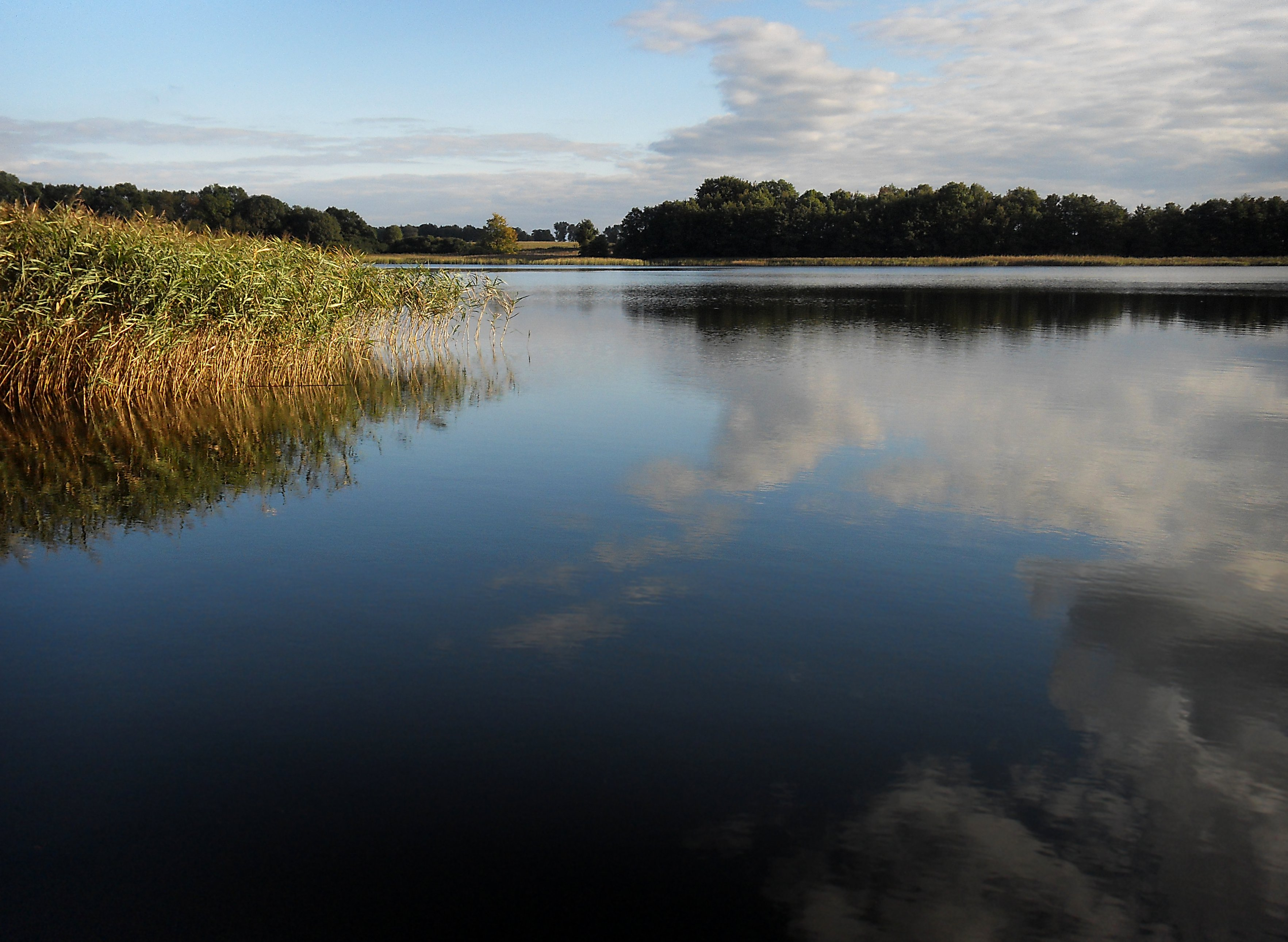
- Bibowsee in Mecklenburg-Western Pomerania (Sternberger Seenlandschaft)

- Location within Mecklenburg-Vorpommern
- Location: Nordwestmecklenburg, Mecklenburg-Vorpommern
- Coordinates: 53°47′22″N 11°38′40.5″E
- Basin countries: Germany
- Max. length: 1.75 km (1.09 mi)
- Max. width: 0.64 km (0.40 mi)
- Surface area: 0.79 km^{2} (0.31 sq mi)
- Max. depth: 8.3 m (27 ft)
- Shore length^{1}: 4.4 km (2.7 mi)
- Surface elevation: 20.1 m (66 ft)
- ^{1} Shore length is not a well-defined measure.

Bibowsee is a lake in the Nordwestmecklenburg district in Mecklenburg-Vorpommern, Germany. At an elevation of 20.1 m, its surface area is 0.79 km².
