= Königsfeld, Mecklenburg-Vorpommern =

Königsfeld
- Municipality
- Location of Königsfeld within Nordwestmecklenburg district
- Interactive map of Königsfeld
- Location within Germany Location within Mecklenburg-Vorpommern
- Coordinates: 53°45′N 11°00′E
- Country: Germany
- State: Mecklenburg-Vorpommern
- District: Nordwestmecklenburg
- Municipal assoc.: Rehna

Government
  - Mayor: Klaus Babbe

Area
  - Total: 32.74 km^{2} (12.64 sq mi)
- Elevation: 40 m (130 ft)

Population (2025-12-31)
  - Total: 940
  - Density: 29/km^{2} (74/sq mi)
- Time zone: UTC+01:00 (CET)
  - Summer (DST): UTC+02:00 (CEST)
- Postal codes: 19217
- Dialling codes: 038872, 038873
- Vehicle registration: NWM

Königsfeld (German pronunciation: [ˈkøːnɪçsˌfɛlt]) is a municipality in the Nordwestmecklenburg district, in Mecklenburg-Vorpommern, Germany.
