= Roduchelstorf =

- Municipality
- Location of Roduchelstorf within Nordwestmecklenburg district
- Interactive map of Roduchelstorf
- Location within Germany Location within Mecklenburg-Vorpommern
- Coordinates: 53°49′N 10°58′E
- Country: Germany
- State: Mecklenburg-Vorpommern
- District: Nordwestmecklenburg
- Municipal assoc.: Schönberger Land

Government
  - Mayor: Sigrid Melahn

Area
  - Total: 9.81 km^{2} (3.79 sq mi)
- Elevation: 34 m (112 ft)

Population (2025-12-31)
  - Total: 243
  - Density: 24.8/km^{2} (64.2/sq mi)
- Time zone: UTC+01:00 (CET)
  - Summer (DST): UTC+02:00 (CEST)
- Postal codes: 23923
- Dialling codes: 038828
- Vehicle registration: NWM
- Website: www.schoenberg-land.de

Roduchelstorf is a municipality in the Nordwestmecklenburg district, in Mecklenburg-Vorpommern, Germany.
