= Rieps =

- Municipality
- Location of Rieps within Nordwestmecklenburg district
- Interactive map of Rieps
- Location within Germany Location within Mecklenburg-Vorpommern
- Coordinates: 53°46′N 10°52′E
- Country: Germany
- State: Mecklenburg-Vorpommern
- District: Nordwestmecklenburg
- Municipal assoc.: Rehna

Government
  - Mayor: Uwe Tollgreve

Area
  - Total: 12.16 km^{2} (4.70 sq mi)
- Elevation: 42 m (138 ft)

Population (2025-12-31)
  - Total: 367
  - Density: 30.2/km^{2} (78.2/sq mi)
- Time zone: UTC+01:00 (CET)
  - Summer (DST): UTC+02:00 (CEST)
- Postal codes: 19217
- Dialling codes: 038873
- Vehicle registration: NWM

Rieps is a municipality in the Nordwestmecklenburg district, in Mecklenburg-Vorpommern, Germany.
