= Stepenitztal =

- Municipality
- Location of Stepenitztal within Nordwestmecklenburg district
- Interactive map of Stepenitztal
- Location within Germany Location within Mecklenburg-Vorpommern
- Coordinates: 53°52′N 11°05′E
- Country: Germany
- State: Mecklenburg-Vorpommern
- District: Nordwestmecklenburg
- Municipal assoc.: Grevesmühlen-Land

Area
  - Total: 45.03 km^{2} (17.39 sq mi)
- Elevation: 29 m (95 ft)

Population (2025-12-31)
  - Total: 1,713
  - Density: 38.04/km^{2} (98.53/sq mi)
- Time zone: UTC+01:00 (CET)
  - Summer (DST): UTC+02:00 (CEST)
- Postal codes: 23936, 23923
- Dialling codes: 038824, 03881
- Vehicle registration: NWM
- Website: www.grevesmuehlen.de

Stepenitztal is a municipality in the Nordwestmecklenburg district, in Mecklenburg-Vorpommern, Germany. It takes its name from the river Stepenitz. It was formed on 25 May 2014 by the merger of the former municipalities Börzow, Mallentin and Papenhusen.
