= Upahl =

- Municipality
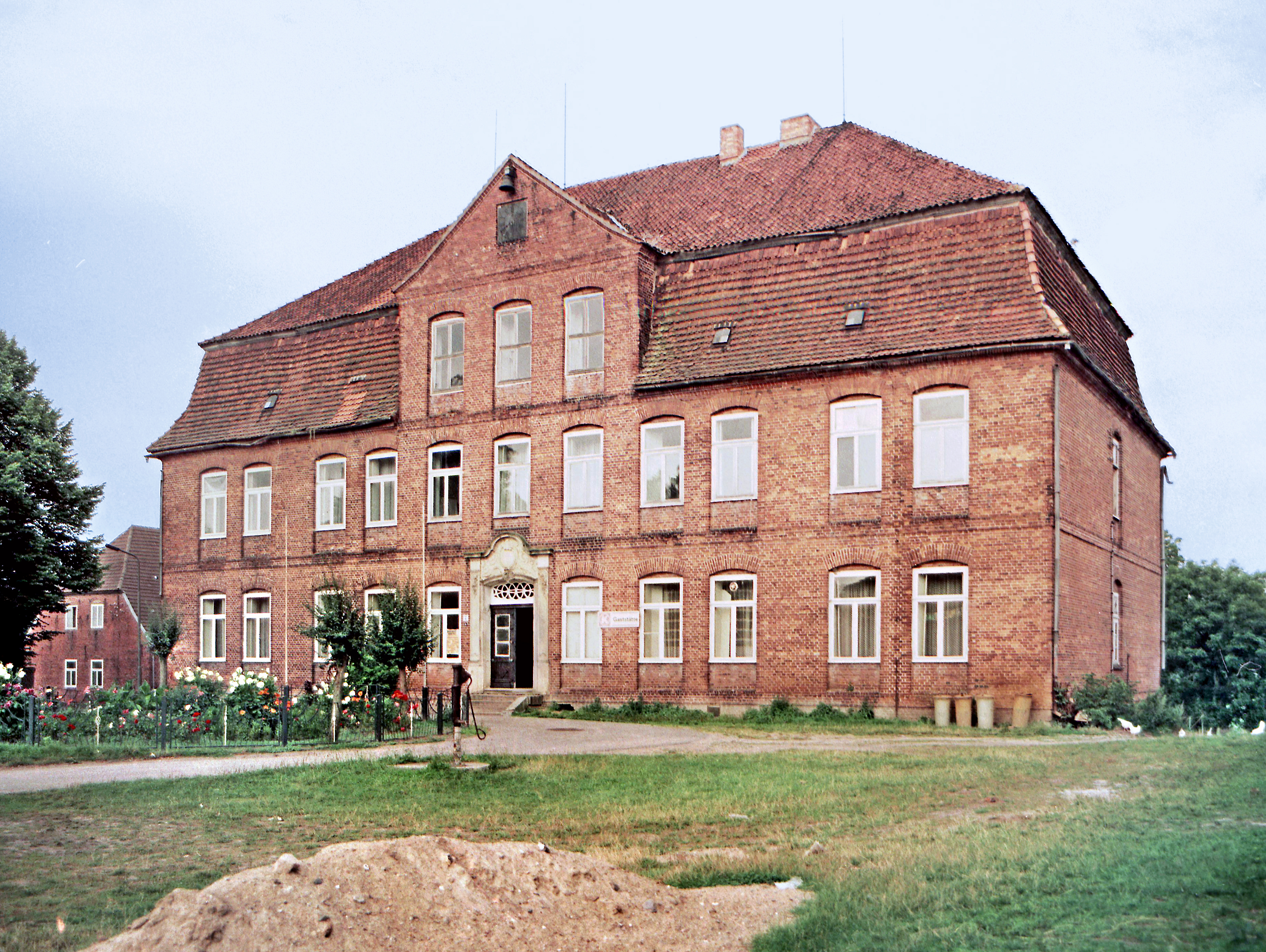
- Schloss Plüschow in Upahl

- Coat of arms

- Location of Upahl within Nordwestmecklenburg district
- Interactive map of Upahl
- Location within Germany Location within Mecklenburg-Vorpommern
- Coordinates: 53°49′N 11°13′E
- Country: Germany
- State: Mecklenburg-Vorpommern
- District: Nordwestmecklenburg
- Municipal assoc.: Grevesmühlen-Land

Government
  - Mayor: Steve Springer

Area
  - Total: 48.08 km^{2} (18.56 sq mi)
- Elevation: 37 m (121 ft)

Population (2025-12-31)
  - Total: 1,591
  - Density: 33.09/km^{2} (85.70/sq mi)
- Time zone: UTC+01:00 (CET)
  - Summer (DST): UTC+02:00 (CEST)
- Postal codes: 23936
- Dialling codes: 038822
- Vehicle registration: NWM
- Website: www.grevesmuehlen.de

Upahl is a municipality in the Nordwestmecklenburg district, in Mecklenburg-Vorpommern, Germany. The former municipality Plüschow was merged into Upahl in January 2019.
