= Thandorf =

- Municipality
- Location of Thandorf within Nordwestmecklenburg district
- Interactive map of Thandorf
- Location within Germany Location within Mecklenburg-Vorpommern
- Coordinates: 53°46′N 10°49′E
- Country: Germany
- State: Mecklenburg-Vorpommern
- District: Nordwestmecklenburg
- Municipal assoc.: Rehna

Government
  - Mayor: Wolfgang Reetz

Area
  - Total: 9.08 km^{2} (3.51 sq mi)
- Elevation: 57 m (187 ft)

Population (2025-12-31)
  - Total: 176
  - Density: 19.4/km^{2} (50.2/sq mi)
- Time zone: UTC+01:00 (CET)
  - Summer (DST): UTC+02:00 (CEST)
- Postal codes: 19217
- Dialling codes: 038875
- Vehicle registration: NWM

Thandorf is a municipality in the Nordwestmecklenburg district, in Mecklenburg-Vorpommern, Germany, European Union.
