= Blowatz =

- Municipality
- Coat of arms

- Location of Blowatz within Nordwestmecklenburg district
- Interactive map of Blowatz
- Location within Germany Location within Mecklenburg-Vorpommern
- Coordinates: 53°58′N 11°31′E
- Country: Germany
- State: Mecklenburg-Vorpommern
- District: Nordwestmecklenburg
- Municipal assoc.: Neuburg
- Subdivisions: 9

Government
  - Mayor: Tino Schmidt (SPD)

Area
  - Total: 30.21 km^{2} (11.66 sq mi)
- Elevation: 14 m (46 ft)

Population (2025-12-31)
  - Total: 1,119
  - Density: 37.04/km^{2} (95.94/sq mi)
- Time zone: UTC+01:00 (CET)
  - Summer (DST): UTC+02:00 (CEST)
- Postal codes: 23974
- Dialling codes: 038427
- Vehicle registration: NWM
- Website: www.amt-neuburg.de

Blowatz is a municipality in the Nordwestmecklenburg district, in Mecklenburg-Vorpommern, Germany.
