= Carlow, Germany =

Carlow
- Municipality
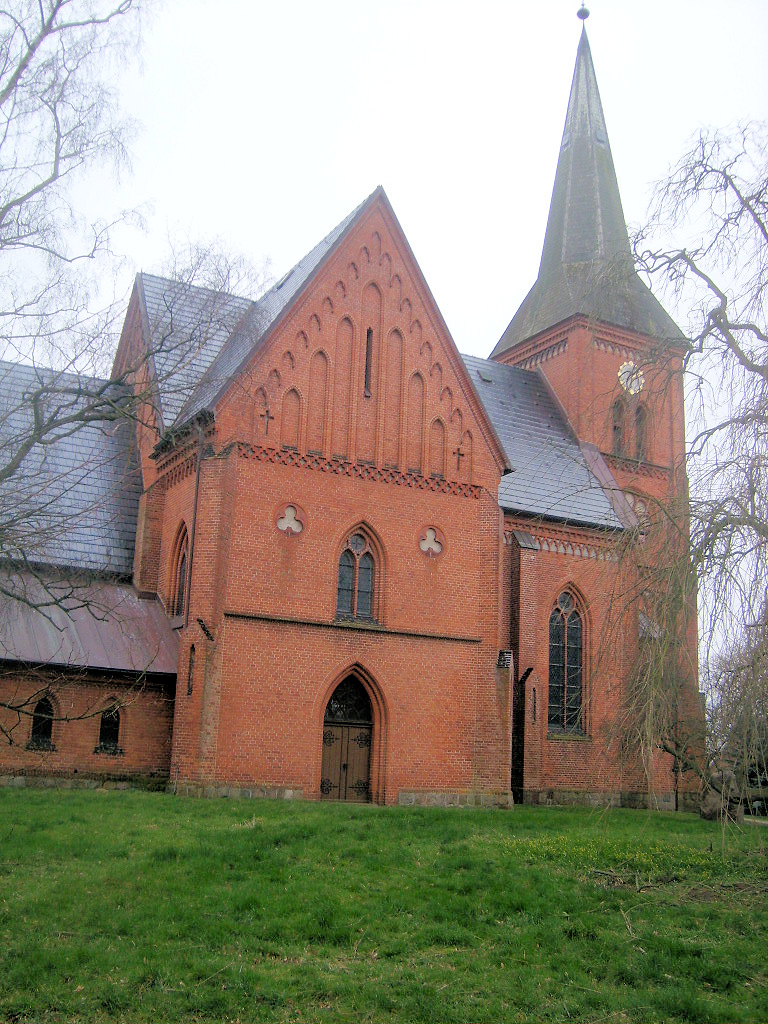
- Parish church of Carlow

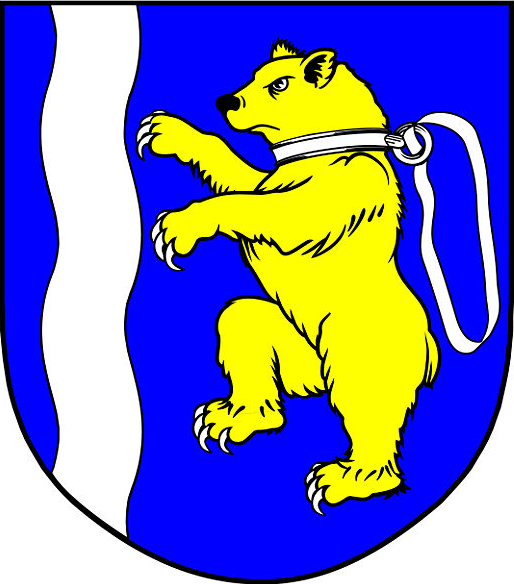
- Coat of arms
- Interactive map of Carlow
- Location within Germany Location within Mecklenburg-Vorpommern
- Coordinates: 53°46′N 10°55′E
- Country: Germany
- State: Mecklenburg-Vorpommern
- District: Nordwestmecklenburg
- Municipal assoc.: Rehna

Government
  - Mayor: Reinhard Wienecke

Area
  - Total: 31.30 km^{2} (12.08 sq mi)
- Elevation: 43 m (141 ft)

Population (2025-12-31)
  - Total: 1,211
  - Density: 38.69/km^{2} (100.2/sq mi)
- Time zone: UTC+01:00 (CET)
  - Summer (DST): UTC+02:00 (CEST)
- Postal codes: 19217
- Dialling codes: 038873
- Vehicle registration: NWM

Carlow is a municipality in the Nordwestmecklenburg district, in Mecklenburg-Vorpommern, Germany. It includes the quarters (German: Ortsteil) of Klein Molzahn, Klocksdorf, Kuhlrade, Neschow, Pogez, Samkow and Stove.
