= Rehna =

Town in Mecklenburg-Vorpommern, Germany

- Town
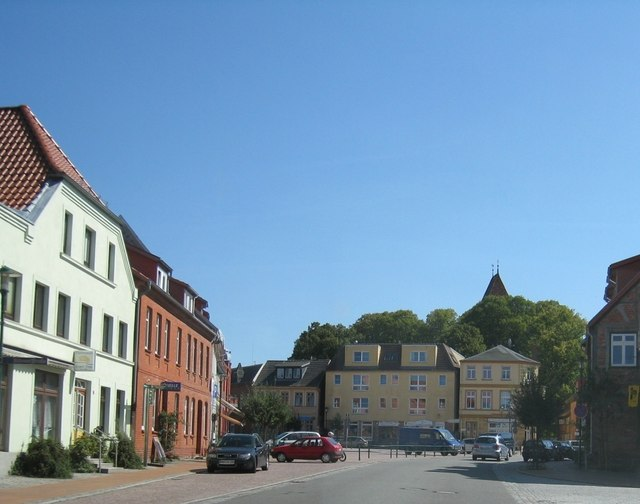
- Market square in Rehna

- Coat of arms

- Location of Rehna within Nordwestmecklenburg district
- Interactive map of Rehna
- Location within Germany Location within Mecklenburg-Vorpommern
- Coordinates: 53°46′N 11°02′E
- Country: Germany
- State: Mecklenburg-Vorpommern
- District: Nordwestmecklenburg
- Municipal assoc.: Rehna

Government
  - Mayor: Hans Jochen Oldenburg (Ind.)

Area
  - Total: 44.59 km^{2} (17.22 sq mi)
- Elevation: 24 m (79 ft)

Population (2025-12-31)
  - Total: 3,525
  - Density: 79.05/km^{2} (204.7/sq mi)
- Time zone: UTC+01:00 (CET)
  - Summer (DST): UTC+02:00 (CEST)
- Postal codes: 19217
- Dialling codes: 038872
- Vehicle registration: NWM
- Website: www.rehna.de

Rehna (German pronunciation: [ˈʁeːna]) is a town in the Nordwestmecklenburg district, in Mecklenburg-Western Pomerania, Germany. It is situated 26 km southeast of Lübeck, and 28 km northwest of Schwerin. It is part of the Hamburg Metropolitan Region.
