= Schlagsdorf =

- Municipality
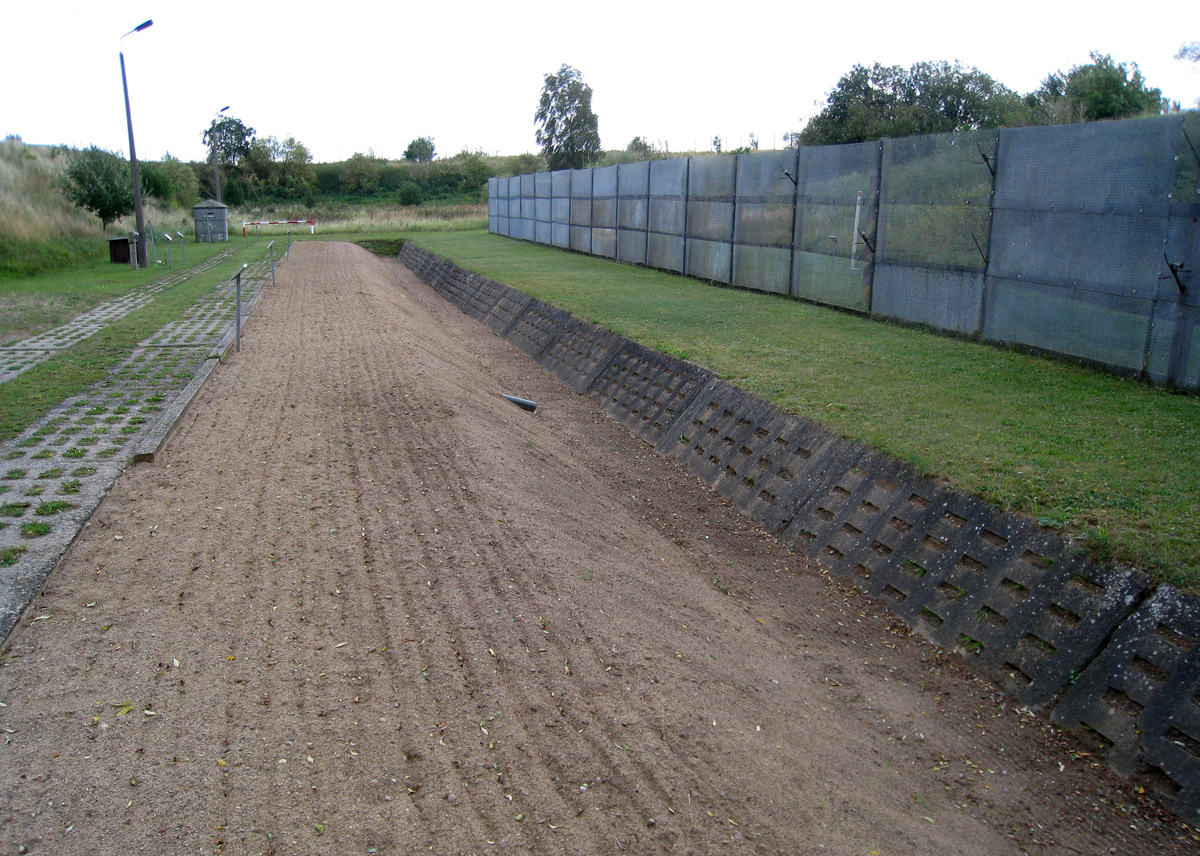
- Part of the former Inner German border preserved at Museum Grenzhus in Schlagsdorf

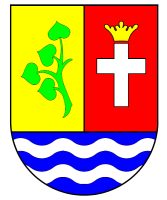
- Coat of arms

- Location of Schlagsdorf within Nordwestmecklenburg district
- Interactive map of Schlagsdorf
- Location within Germany Location within Mecklenburg-Vorpommern
- Coordinates: 53°43′N 10°49′E
- Country: Germany
- State: Mecklenburg-Vorpommern
- District: Nordwestmecklenburg
- Municipal assoc.: Rehna

Government
  - Mayor: Ingo Melchin

Area
  - Total: 20.12 km^{2} (7.77 sq mi)
- Elevation: 39 m (128 ft)

Population (2025-12-31)
  - Total: 1,282
  - Density: 63.72/km^{2} (165.0/sq mi)
- Time zone: UTC+01:00 (CET)
  - Summer (DST): UTC+02:00 (CEST)
- Postal codes: 19217
- Dialling codes: 038875
- Vehicle registration: NWM

Schlagsdorf is a municipality in the Nordwestmecklenburg district, in Mecklenburg-Vorpommern, Germany. Until the Wende it was located at the inner German border.
