= Lüdersdorf =

- Municipality
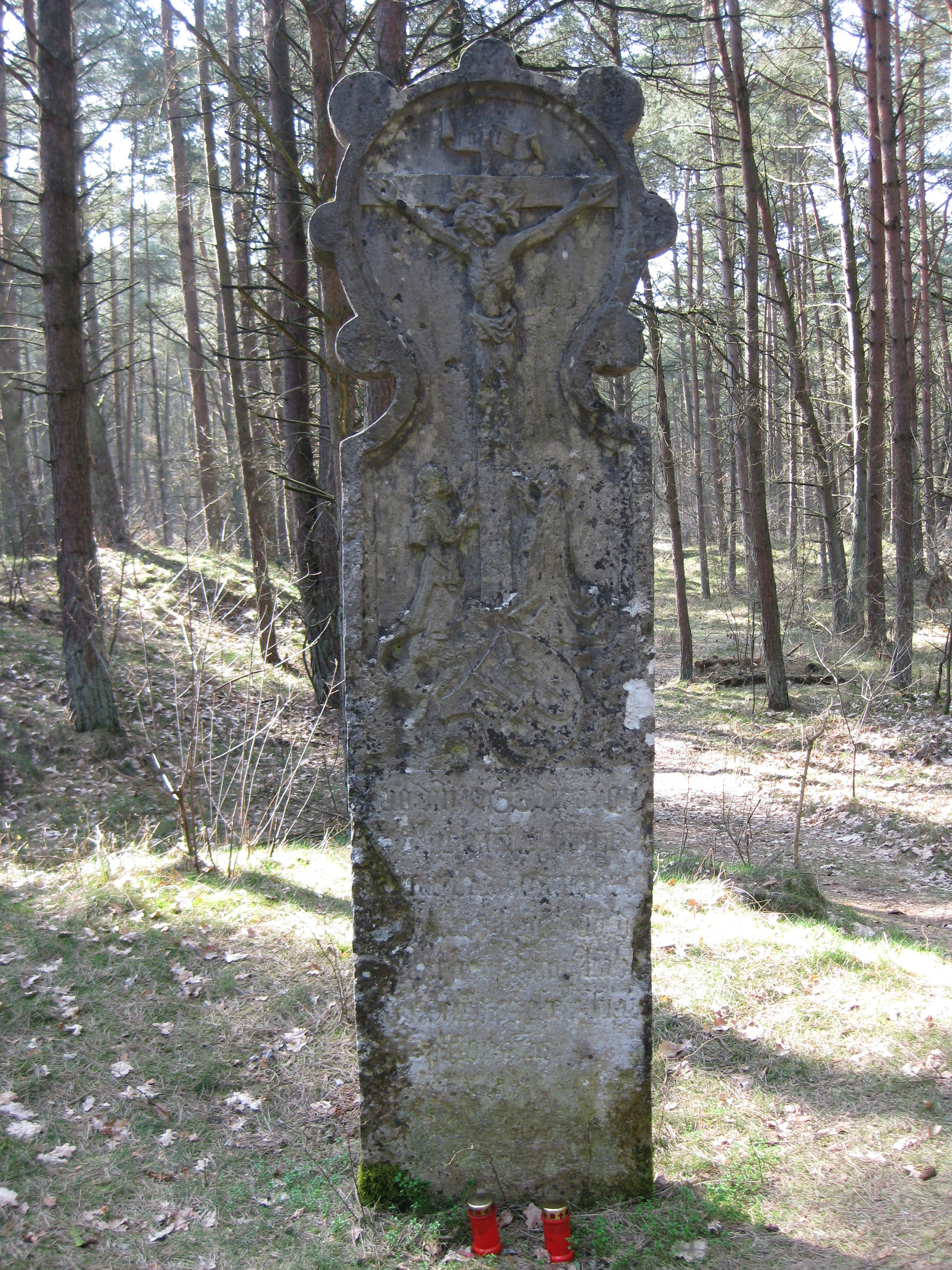
- Pomerstein in Lüdersdorf

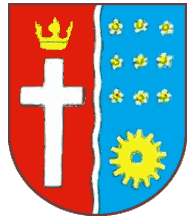
- Coat of arms

- Location of Lüdersdorf within Nordwestmecklenburg district
- Interactive map of Lüdersdorf
- Location within Germany Location within Mecklenburg-Vorpommern
- Coordinates: 53°49′N 10°49′E
- Country: Germany
- State: Mecklenburg-Vorpommern
- District: Nordwestmecklenburg
- Municipal assoc.: Schönberger Land

Government
  - Mayor: Dr. Erhard Huzel

Area
  - Total: 54.24 km^{2} (20.94 sq mi)
- Elevation: 17 m (56 ft)

Population (2025-12-31)
  - Total: 5,172
  - Density: 95.35/km^{2} (247.0/sq mi)
- Time zone: UTC+01:00 (CET)
  - Summer (DST): UTC+02:00 (CEST)
- Postal codes: 23923
- Dialling codes: 038821
- Vehicle registration: NWM
- Website: www.schoenberg-land.de

Lüdersdorf is a municipality in the Nordwestmecklenburg district, in Mecklenburg-Vorpommern, Germany.

It is close to the cities of Lübeck, Wismar and Schwerin and is part of the Hamburg Metropolitan Region.
