= Selmsdorf =

- Municipality
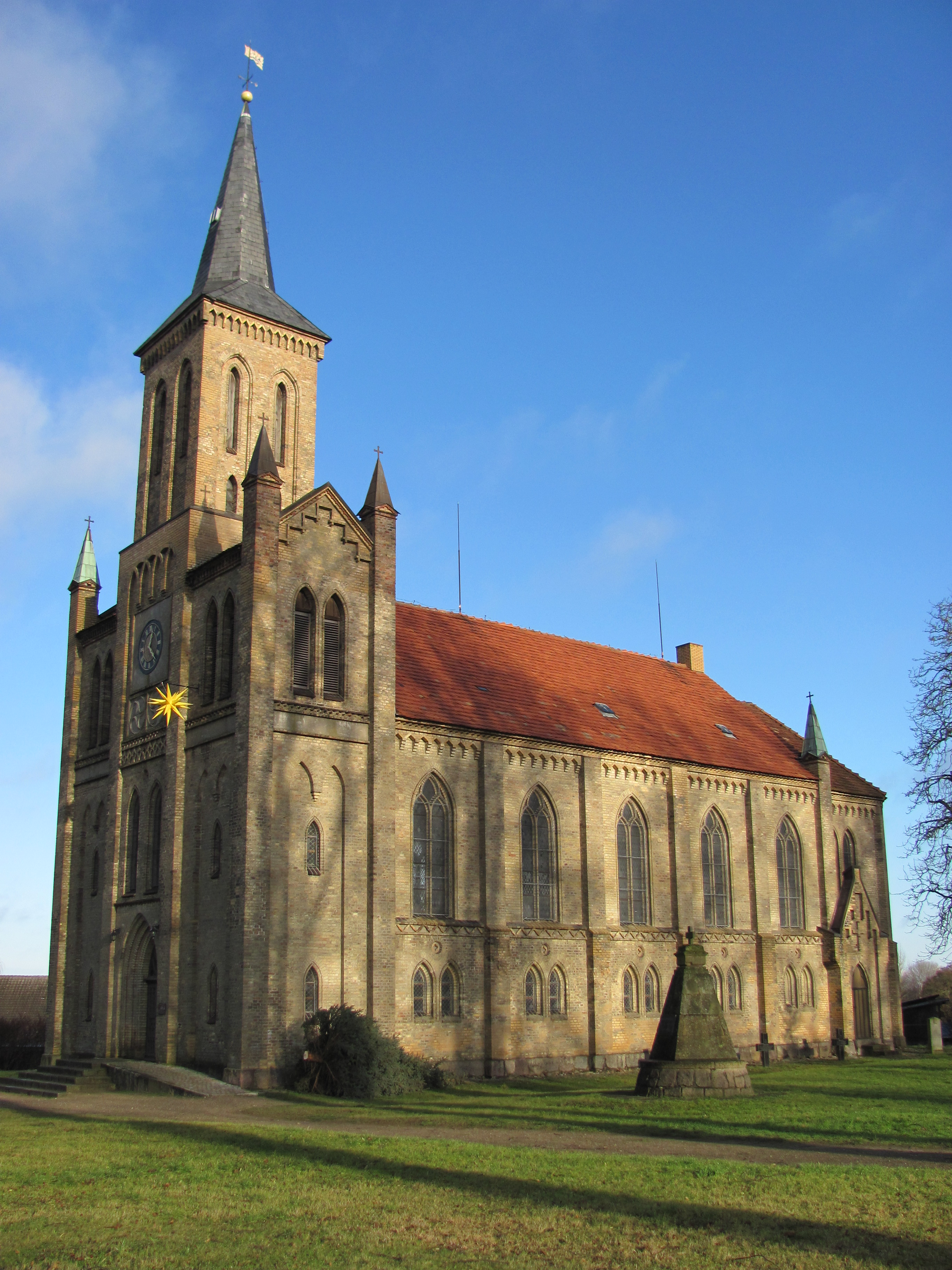
- Church in Selmsdorf

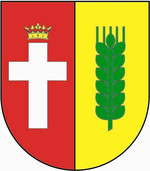
- Coat of arms

- Location of Selmsdorf within Nordwestmecklenburg district
- Interactive map of Selmsdorf
- Location within Germany Location within Mecklenburg-Vorpommern
- Coordinates: 53°52′56″N 10°51′26″E
- Country: Germany
- State: Mecklenburg-Vorpommern
- District: Nordwestmecklenburg
- Municipal assoc.: Schönberger Land

Government
  - Mayor: Marcus Kreft

Area
  - Total: 36.13 km^{2} (13.95 sq mi)
- Elevation: 55 m (180 ft)

Population (2025-12-31)
  - Total: 3,139
  - Density: 86.88/km^{2} (225.0/sq mi)
- Time zone: UTC+01:00 (CET)
  - Summer (DST): UTC+02:00 (CEST)
- Postal codes: 23923
- Dialling codes: 038823
- Vehicle registration: NWM
- Website: selmsdorf0.webnode.com

Selmsdorf is a municipality in the Nordwestmecklenburg district, in Mecklenburg-Vorpommern, Germany located east of Lübeck.

It is also close to the cities of Wismar and Schwerin and is part of the Hamburg Metropolitan Region.
