= Nordwestmecklenburg =

Coordinates: 53°50′N 11°10′E

- District
- Flag Coat of arms
- Country: Germany
- State: Mecklenburg-Vorpommern
- Capital: Wismar

Government
  - District admin.: Tino Schomann (CDU)

Area
  - Total: 2,117 km^{2} (817 sq mi)

Population (31 December 2025)
  - Total: 155,869
  - Density: 73.63/km^{2} (190.7/sq mi)
- Time zone: UTC+01:00 (CET)
  - Summer (DST): UTC+02:00 (CEST)
- Vehicle registration: NWM, GDB, GVM, WIS; Wismar: HWI
- Website: nordwestmecklenburg.de

Nordwestmecklenburg (Northwestern Mecklenburg) is a Kreis (district) in the north-western part of Mecklenburg-Vorpommern, Germany. It is situated on the coast of the Baltic Sea and borders on Schleswig-Holstein to the west. Neighboring districts are (from east clockwise) Rostock, Ludwigslust-Parchim and the district-free city Schwerin, and the district Lauenburg and the district-free city Lübeck in Schleswig-Holstein. The district seat is the town Wismar.

== Geography ==
The district is roughly situated in a triangle between the towns of Lübeck, Rostock and Schwerin.

In the north there is the coast of the Baltic Sea with the small island of Poel.

=== Lakes ===
Two large lakes are partially situated in Nordwestmecklenburg: the eastern half of the Schaalsee (23 km^{2} (8.9 sq mi)) at the western border; and the northern half of the Schweriner See (63 km^{2} (24 sq mi)) in the south, as well as two smaller lakes, Bibowsee (0.79 km^{2} (0.31 sq mi)) and Mechower See (1.6 km^{2} (0.62 sq mi)).

== History ==
Nordwestmecklenburg District was established in 1994 by merging the previous districts of Gadebusch, Grevesmühlen and Wismar, along with smaller parts of the districts of Sternberg and Schwerin-Land. In the 2011 district reform, it was merged with the formerly district-free town Wismar. The name of the district was decided by referendum on 4 September 2011.

== Coat of arms ==
“Party per pale Or and Azure, dexter the half crowned bull's head Sable of Mecklenburg, sinister a bishopric staff Or”. The staff symbolizes the diocese of Ratzeburg, which in 1648 became the Principality of Ratzeburg. It also stands for the diocese of Schwerin. Also the Hanseatic city of Wismar is represented in red-white.

The coat of arms was designed by the designer and heraldic Heinz Kippnick, and was granted on July 1, 1996.

== Towns and municipalities ==
Amt-free towns
1. Grevesmühlen
2. Wismar
Amt-free municipalities
1. Insel Poel

Ämter
1. Dorf Mecklenburg-Bad Kleinen; 1. Bad Kleinen; 2. Barnekow; 3. Bobitz; 4. Dorf Mecklenburg^{1}; 5. Groß Stieten; 6. Hohen Viecheln; 7. Lübow; 8. Metelsdorf; 9. Ventschow; 2. Gadebusch; 1. Dragun; 2. Gadebusch^{1, 2}; 3. Kneese; 4. Krembz; 5. Mühlen Eichsen; 6. Roggendorf; 7. Rögnitz; 8. Veelböken; 3. Grevesmühlen-Land; [seat: Grevesmühlen]: 1. Bernstorf; 2. Gägelow; 3. Roggenstorf; 4. Rüting; 5. Stepenitztal; 6. Testorf-Steinfort; 7. Upahl; 8. Warnow	4. Klützer Winkel; 1. Boltenhagen; 2. Damshagen; 3. Hohenkirchen; 4. Kalkhorst; 5. Klütz^{1, 2}; 6. Zierow; 5. Lützow-Lübstorf; 1. Alt Meteln; 2. Brüsewitz; 3. Cramonshagen; 4. Dalberg-Wendelstorf; 5. Gottesgabe; 6. Grambow; 7. Klein Trebbow; 8. Lübstorf; 9. Lützow^{1}; 10. Perlin; 11. Pingelshagen; 12. Pokrent; 13. Schildetal; 14. Seehof; 15. Zickhusen; 6. Neuburg; 1. Benz; 2. Blowatz; 3. Boiensdorf; 4. Hornstorf; 5. Krusenhagen; 6. Neuburg^{1}	7. Neukloster-Warin; 1. Bibow; 2. Glasin; 3. Jesendorf; 4. Lübberstorf; 5. Neukloster^{1, 2}; 6. Passee; 7. Warin^{2}; 8. Zurow; 9. Züsow; 8. Rehna; 1. Carlow; 2. Dechow; 3. Groß Molzahn; 4. Holdorf; 5. Königsfeld; 6. Rehna^{1, 2}; 7. Rieps; 8. Schlagsdorf; 9. Thandorf; 10. Utecht; 11. Wedendorfersee; 9. Schönberger Land; 1. Dassow^{2}; 2. Grieben; 3. Lüdersdorf; 4. Menzendorf; 5. Roduchelstorf; 6. Schönberg^{1, 2}; 7. Selmsdorf; 8. Siemz-Niendorf
^{1} - seat of the Amt; ^{2} - town

=== Former municipalities ===
The following municipalities that were independently administrative within the district were (situation August 2011):

- Börzow - formerly part of Grevesmühlen-Land Amt; now part of Stepenitztal since 25 May 2014
- Mallentin - formerly part of Grevesmühlen-Land Amt; now part of Stepenitztal since 25 May 2014
- Nesow - formerly part of Rehna Amt; now part of Rehna since 25 May 2014
- Papenhusen - formerly part of Schönberger Land Amt; now part of Stepenitztal since 25 May 2014
- Vitense - formerly part of Rehna Amt; now part of Rehna since 25 May 2014
