= Skirmish at the Schaalsee (1806) =

1806 military engagement in the Napoleonic Wars

- Part of the Napoleonic Wars
Date	23 April 1806
Location	Near Schaalsee, Duchy of Lauenburg
Result	Prussian victory Swedish evacuation of Lauenburg

Belligerents
Kingdom of Prussia	Sweden

Commanders and leaders
Oberst von Beeren	Unknown

Strength
1 Cuirassier regiment 1 Infantry regiment 4 guns	Unknown

Casualties and losses
1 wounded	Unknown (retreated)

The Skirmish at the Schaalsee (German: Gefecht am Schaalsee) was a military engagement that took place on 23 April 1806 during the Napoleonic Wars, near the Schaalsee lake in the Duchy of Lauenburg. It involved advancing Prussian forces under the command of Oberst (Colonel) von Beeren and defending Swedish troops.

The skirmish occurred as part of the Prussian enforcement of the Treaty of Paris, which had awarded Hanover and Lauenburg to Prussia, prompting a localized conflict with Sweden, an ally of Great Britain. Some modern historical queries have incorrectly described the event as a clash involving retreating Prussian forces due to the Prussian retreat through the same region in November 1806. Regional histories state that the April action was a Prussian advance that resulted in the Swedish evacuation of the region.

== Background ==
Following the Treaty of Paris on 15 February 1806, Napoleon I ceded the Electorate of Hanover (which included the Duchy of Lauenburg) to Prussia in exchange for other territories. This move was opposed by Great Britain, whose monarch was also the Elector of Hanover. King Gustav IV Adolf of Sweden, acting as a British ally, dispatched troops from Swedish Pomerania and Wismar into Prussian Pomerania and Lauenburg to contest the Prussian occupation.

In response, Prussia formed an observation corps under General Count Kalckreuth near Stettin. Colonel von Beeren was given the mission to expel the Swedes from Lauenburg using his Cuirassier Regiment (the former Kurprinz regiment, known as the "Yellow Riders" for their yellow kollets), the Infantry Regiment von Tschammer, and four artillery pieces. Beeren's orders were cautious, instructing him to push the Swedes back "if possible without firing sharply" to avoid triggering a wider war.

== The Action ==
By 19 April 1806, Beeren's detachment had assembled between Wittenburg and Hagenow. The Swedish forces had established a defensive position between Mölln and the Schaalsee lake, near the village of Seedorf. On 23 April, Beeren launched an advance into Lauenburg, dividing his force into three columns:

- The right column, commanded by Major von Quitzow, advanced via Zarrentin toward Seedorf.
- The center column, led by Beeren, moved via Valluhn and Gudow toward Mölln.
- The left column, under Rittmeister (Captain) von Schulz, marched toward Lauenburg.

The engagement involved limited combat. A short firefight occurred at Groß Zecher, resulting in a single recorded casualty: a lieutenant of Beeren's cuirassiers was wounded. Facing a three-column advance, the Swedish troops evacuated the territory, retreating via Gadebusch.

== Aftermath ==
Following the expulsion of the Swedes, Beeren's regiment marched towards Celle and subsequently participated in the Battle of Auerstedt in October 1806. During the subsequent Prussian retreat in late 1806, remnants of the regiment joined Gebhard Leberecht von Blücher's corps, fighting in the streets of Lübeck before capitulating at Ratekau in November.

== Historiography ==
The engagement is listed in 19th-century military compendiums, notably A. Straehle's 1854 Lexicon der Schlachten, Treffen, Gefechte..., which catalogues engagements involving Brandenburg-Prussian troops. Because the same Prussian regiments were in the region during the retreat of November 1806 (fighting the French at Lübeck), modern historical queries have sometimes incorrectly described the Action of Schaalsee as a clash between retreating Prussian forces and Swedish troops. Primary and regional historical sources state that in April 1806, the Prussians were the advancing force enforcing a territorial treaty, while the Swedes retreated.
