= Tourism in Schleswig-Holstein =

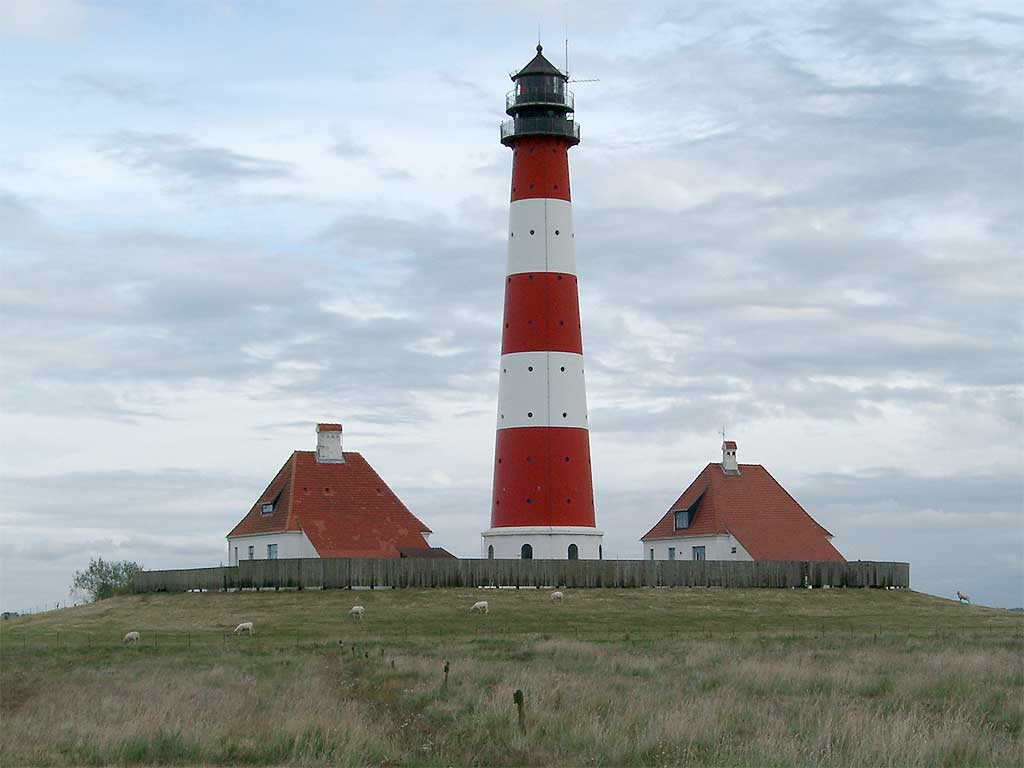
Westerheversand Lighthouse

Tourism is an important economic factor for Germany's northernmost state of Schleswig-Holstein.

Thanks to its coasts on the North Sea in the west and Baltic Sea in the east, Schleswig-Holstein has a great variety of beaches and water sports facilities. Due to its geographical location on the way to Scandinavia it is also a transit area for tourists from all over Europe.

== Important tourist resorts ==
=== Statistics ===
In 2002 there were a total of 176,198 guest beds in Schleswig-Holstein, which were used that year by 2,968,406 visitors for 15,429,614 overnight stays. 278,786 der visitors came from abroad, which represents about 8.6% of all overnighting guests. The bathing resorts on the Baltic Sea had somewhat more visitors (720,115) than those on the North Sea (604,548), but on average the North Sea guests stayed longer, so that the total of overnight stays was greater (5,122,549) than on the Baltic Sea. Less important to tourism were the climatic spas (153,538 visitors with 592,705 overnight stays) and health spas (132,337 visitors with 755,153 overnight stays).

The most important destinations for tourists were, in order of the number of overnight stays:

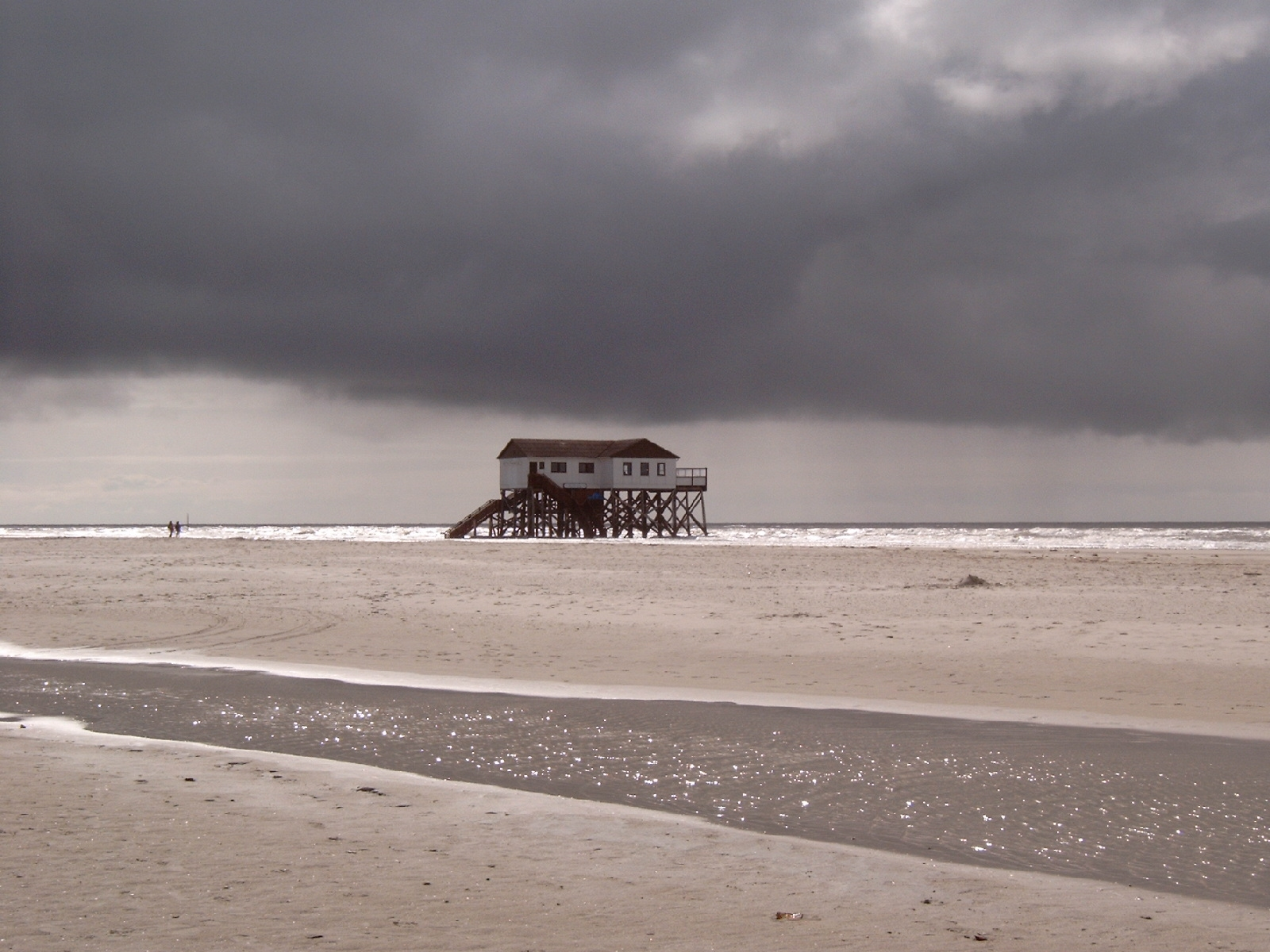
Building on stilts at St. Peter-Ording

- Sankt Peter-Ording, North Sea: 909,920 overnight stays, 101,607 visitors of whom 408 (0.4%) from abroad, 8,991 guest beds.
- Westerland, Sylt, North Sea: 819,935 overnight stays, 96,120 visitors of whom 271 (0.28%) from abroad, 9,159 guest beds.
- Grömitz, Baltic Sea: 714,188 overnight stays, 96,116 visitors of whom 413 (0.43%) from abroad, 8,305 guest beds.
- Timmendorfer Strand, Baltic Sea: 676,510 overnight stays, 124,761 visitors of whom 2,567 (2.0%) from abroad, 6,771 guest beds.
- Büsum, North Sea: 658,723, 83,295 visitors, of whom 480 (0.57%) from abroad, 6,846 guest beds.
- Wyk auf Föhr, North Sea: 492,041 overnight stays, 46,368 visitors, of whom 325 (0.70%) from abroad, 4,733 guest beds.
- Burg auf Fehmarn, Baltic Sea: 312,115 overnight stays, 47,704 visitors, of whom 1,476 (3.0%) from abroad, 3 364 guest beds.
- Scharbeutz, Baltic Sea: 292,468 overnight stays, 45,314 visitors, of whom 1,366 (2.92%) from abroad, 3,940 guest beds.
- Norddorf, Amrum, North Sea: 276,978 overnight stays, 25,098 visitors, of whom 576 (2.24%) from abroad, 2,162 guest beds.
- Wenningstedt, Sylt, North Sea: 276,344 overnight stays, 36,775 visitors, of whom 570 (1.53%) from abroad, 2,650 guest beds.

The most important health spa was Malente with 232,000 overnight stays, most important climatic spa was Plön with 132,000 overnight stays.

=== Regions ===
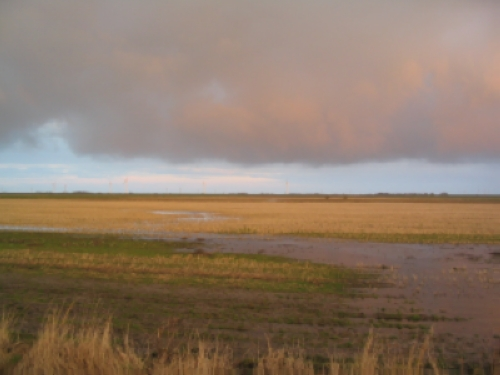
Westerkoog in Dithmarschen

- Angeln
- Bungsberg
- Danish Wahld
- Dithmarschen
- Eiderstedt
- Elbe Marshes
- Mittelholstein with the Aukrug Nature Park and the Westensee Nature Park
- Holstein Switzerland Nature Park, (Schleswig-Holstein Uplands) the heart region of Wagria with the Plöner See
- Hüttener Berge Nature Park
- Lauenburg Lakes Nature Park
- North Frisia
- Probstei
- Sachsenwald, the largest forest in Schleswig-Holstein, owned by the Bismarck family
- Schleswig Geest, large pine forests
- Schwansen
- Wagria

==== North Sea coast ====
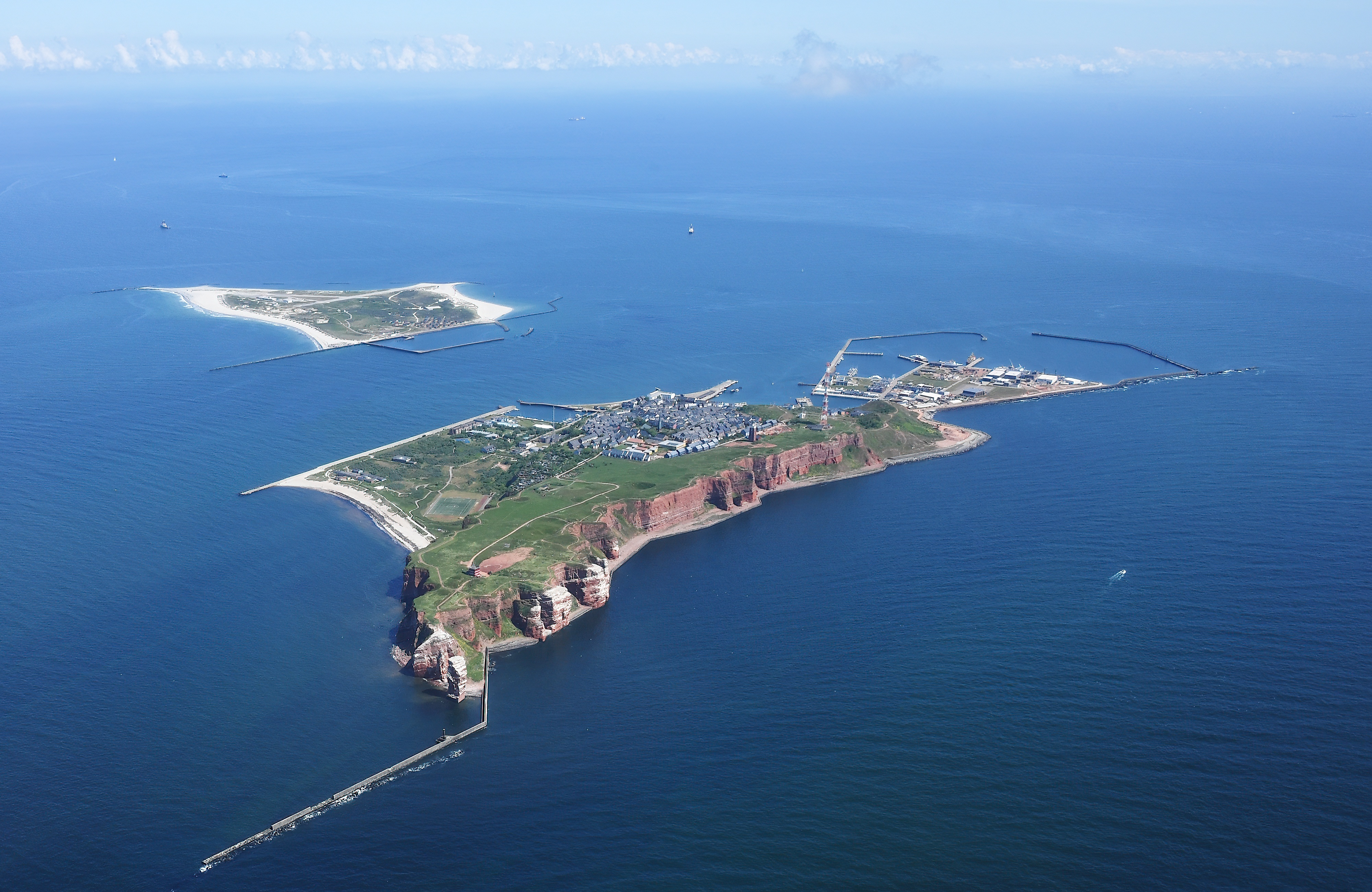
A bird's eye view of Heligoland

- Wadden Sea, Schleswig-Holstein Wadden Sea National Park, mudflat hiking
- Amrum
- Föhr
- Helgoland
- Pellworm
- Sylt
- The Halligen
- North Frisia
- Bay of Husum
- Eiderstedt

==== Baltic Sea coast ====
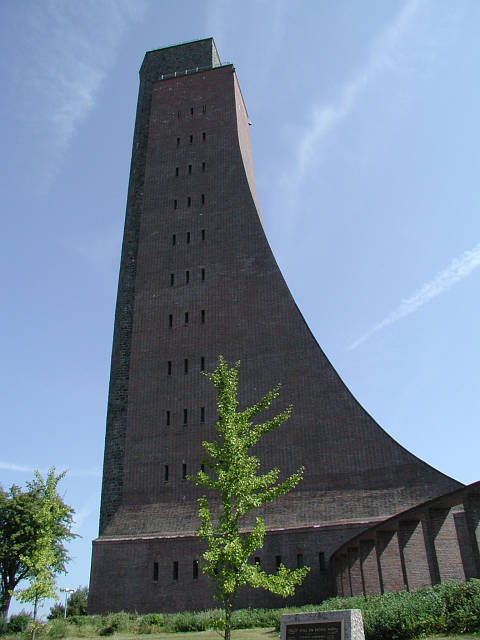
Laboe Naval Memorial

- Island of Fehmarn
- Eckernförde Bay
- Flensburg Fjord
- Damp
- Grömitz
- Heiligenhafen
- Kiel Fjord
- Baltic Seaside Resort of Laboe
- Lübeck Bay
- Neustadt in Holstein
- Scharbeutz
- Schlei
- Sierksdorf
- Timmendorfer Strand
- Travemünde and the Priwall

=== Towns ===
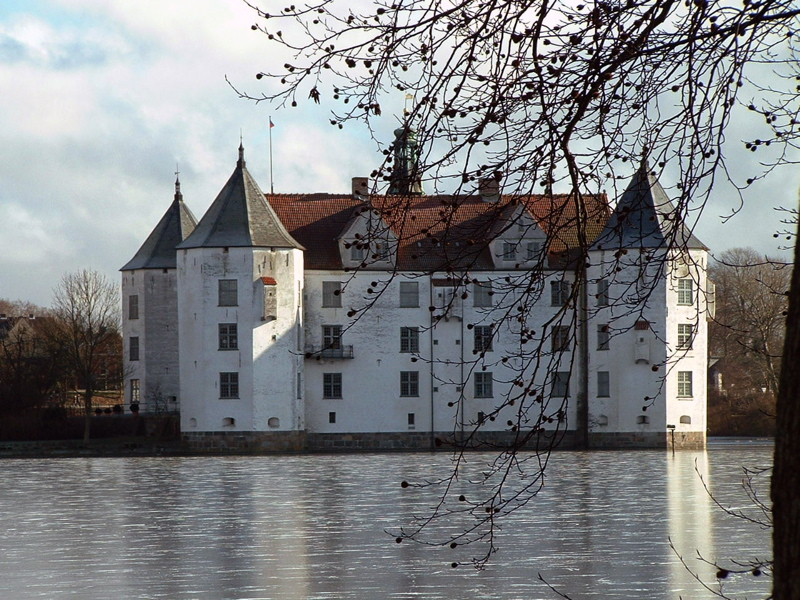
Glücksburg Castle

- Eutin (Castle)
- Flensburg
- Friedrichstadt
- Glücksburg (water castle)
- Husum
- State capital of Kiel
- Hanseatic city of Lübeck (UNESCO World Heritage Site)
- Plön
- Shoemakers' town of Preetz
- Island town of Ratzeburg
- Schleswig (Gottorf Castle)

=== International events ===
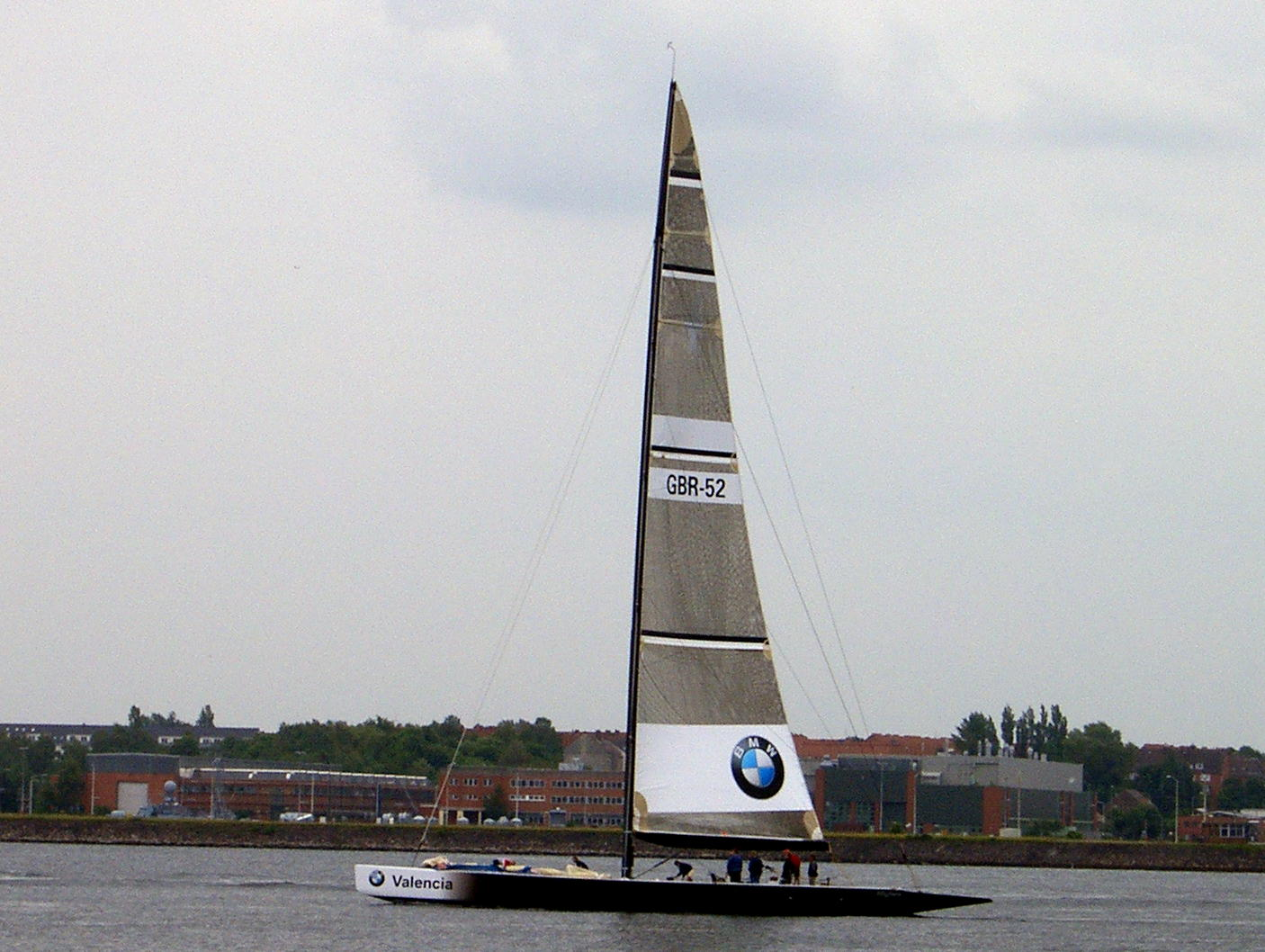
Kiel Week

- Kiel Week, biggest sailing regatta in the world and biggest summer festival in Northern Europe
- Travemünde Week, the second biggest regatta in the world
- North Sea Week, biggest German regatta for touring sailors on the North Sea off Heligoland
- Robbe & Berking Classic Week, Flensburg Fjord, biggest German regatta series for classic yachts (built before 1969, no yachts built with man-made materials)
- Rum Regatta, biggest gaff rig sailing event in Flensburg
- Lübeck Nordic Film Days
- Schleswig-Holstein Musik Festival, one of the most important music festivals in Europe
- Jazz Baltica, international jazz festival
- Folk Baltica, international folk festival
- Karl May Festival in Bad Segeberg
- Harbour Days (Hafentage) in Husum, biggest maritime town event on the west coast
- Rarities of Piano Music in Husum, internationally renowned piano festival at Husum Castle
- International Puppet Theatre Festival "Pole Poppenspäler Tage" in Husum

=== Important museums ===
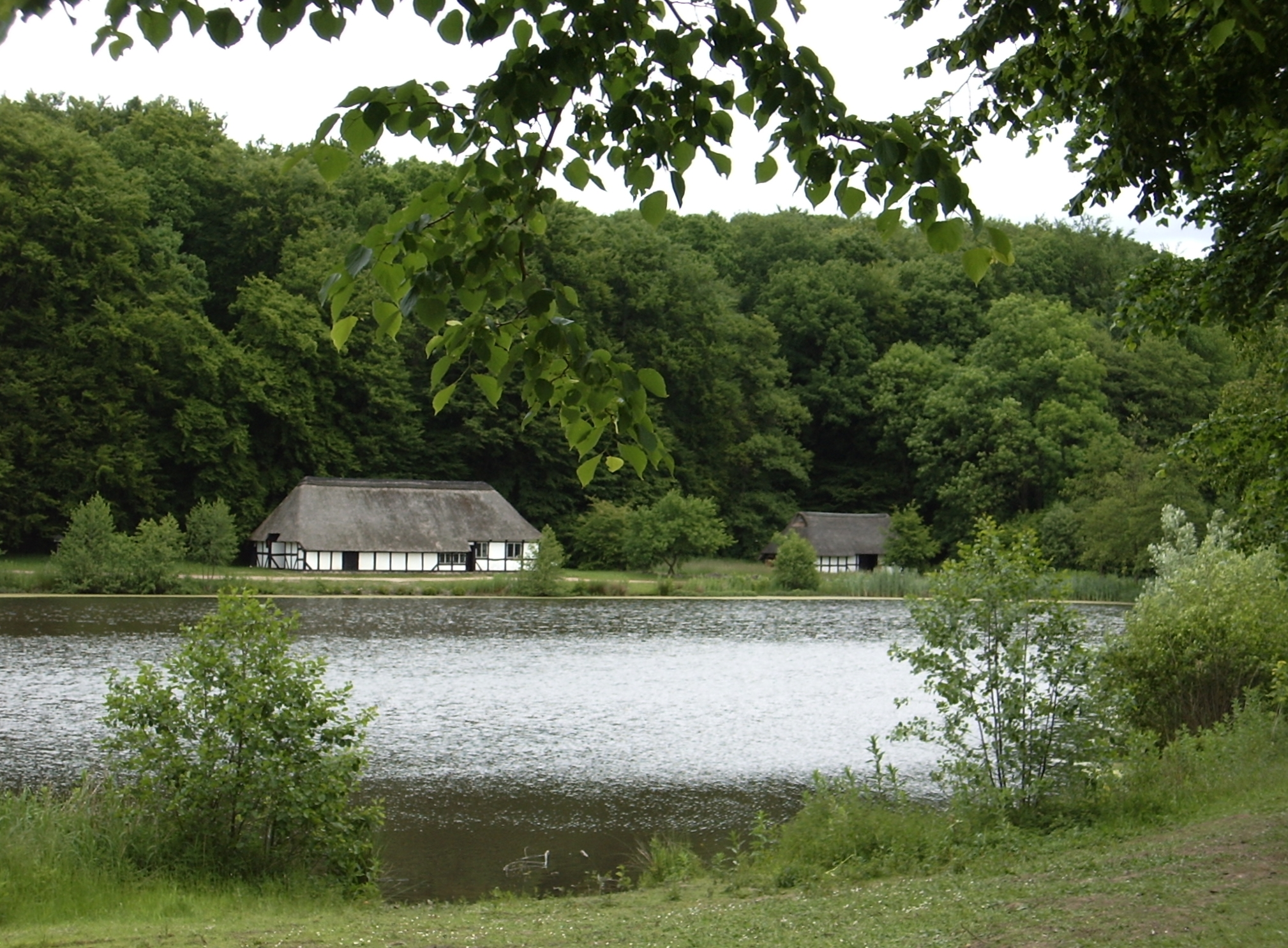
Farmhouses in Molfsee

- Schleswig-Holstein Open Air Museum in Molfsee near Kiel
- Museumsberg (in Flensburg)
- Kunsthalle Kiel
- Behnhaus (in Lübeck)
- St. Anne's Museum Quarter (in Lübeck)
- Holstentor (in Lübeck)
- Lübeck Museum of Theatre Puppets
- Buddenbrookhaus (in Lübeck)
- Gottorf Castle (in Schleswig)
- Danewerk Museum (near Schleswig)
- Haithabu Viking Museum (near Schleswig)
- Theodor Storm Centre (in Husum)
- Husum North Sea Museum / Nissenhaus (in Husum)
- Husum Castle (in Husum)
- Laboe Naval Memorial and U 995 (in Laboe)

=== Cycleways and footpaths ===
- Old Salt Road between Lübeck and Lüneburg
- Monks Way (Mönchsweg)
- North Sea Cycle Route
- Eider-Treene-Sorge Cycleway
- Baltic Sea Coast Cycleway
- Ox Road (Ochsenweg)
- Viking-Frisian Way

=== Important leisure facilities ===
- The Hansa Park in Sierksdorf on Lübeck Bay
- Ellerhoop-Thiensen Arboretum
- Tolk-Schau Leisure Park

=== Most beautiful holiday destinations ===
A viewers' poll on holiday destinations in the NDR transmission area, that was carried out in 2007 for the NDR television with the title "The most beautiful holiday destinations in North Germany", resulted in the following rankings within Schleswig-Holstein:

- 7: Sylt,
- 11: Amrum,
- 12: St. Peter Ording,
- 13: Holstein Switzerland,
- 14: Fehmarn,
- 15: Helgoland,
- 18: Schleiregion,
- 19: Lübeck Bay,
- 20: Büsum,
- 21: Lübeck,
- 22: Hallig Hooge,
- 24: Kiel Canal Region,
- 27: Kiel,
- 31: Flensburg,

(The remaining places were won by other places and regions in the rest of NDR's catchment area.)
