= Von Beeren (Prussian officer) =

Prussian cavalry officer (fl. 1806)

Oberst von Beeren
- Born: Unknown
- Died: Unknown
- Military career
- Allegiance: Kingdom of Prussia
- Branch: Prussian Army
- Rank: Oberst (Colonel)
- Commands: Kurprinz Cuirassier Regiment; Lauenburg Expeditionary Detachment
- Conflicts: Napoleonic Wars; Skirmish at the Schaalsee; Battle of Auerstedt; Battle of Lübeck

Oberst von Beeren (fl. 1806) was a Prussian cavalry officer who commanded a mixed-arms detachment during the early stages of the War of the Fourth Coalition. He is known for leading the Prussian advance into the Duchy of Lauenburg in April 1806, which resulted in the Skirmish at the Schaalsee against Swedish forces.

Following the expulsion of the Swedes, Beeren and his regiment joined the Prussian campaigns against Napoleon I later that year, fighting at the Battle of Auerstedt and capitulating at Ratekau after the Battle of Lübeck.

== Military Command ==
By early 1806, von Beeren held the rank of Oberst (Colonel) and commanded a Prussian Cuirassier regiment known as the Kurprinz regiment. The unit was referred to as the "Yellow Riders" (Gelbe Reiter) due to the yellow kollets (tunics) worn by its troopers.

In addition to his cavalry command, Beeren led an expeditionary detachment that included the Infantry Regiment von Tschammer and a battery of four artillery pieces.

== Skirmish at the Schaalsee (April 1806) ==
Following the Treaty of Paris on 15 February 1806, Napoleon ceded the Electorate of Hanover (including Lauenburg) to Prussia. Gustav IV Adolf of Sweden, acting as a British ally, dispatched troops into Lauenburg to contest the Prussian occupation.

In response, the Prussian high command tasked Oberst von Beeren with expelling the Swedish forces from the region. Beeren's orders were cautious; he was instructed to push the Swedes back "if possible without firing sharply" (wenn möglich ohne scharf zu feuern) to avoid starting a wider war with Sweden before Prussia was mobilized against France.

In mid-April 1806, Beeren assembled his detachment between Wittenburg and Hagenow. On 23 April, he launched a three-column advance into Lauenburg:

- The right column, under Major von Quitzow, advanced via Zarrentin toward Seedorf.
- The center column, led by Beeren, moved via Valluhn and Gudow toward Mölln.
- The left column, under Rittmeister von Schulz, marched toward Lauenburg.

The engagement near the Schaalsee was brief. A firefight at Groß Zecher resulted in a single recorded Prussian casualty—a wounded lieutenant in Beeren's cuirassier regiment. Facing Beeren's advance, the Swedish troops evacuated the territory without resisting.

== War of the Fourth Coalition ==
Following the Lauenburg expedition, Beeren's Kurprinz Cuirassiers were redeployed to face the French army. In October 1806, the regiment participated in the Battle of Auerstedt, where the main Prussian army under the Duke of Brunswick was defeated by Marshal Louis-Nicolas Davout's III Corps.

During the subsequent Prussian retreat, remnants of Beeren's regiment joined the corps of General Gebhard Leberecht von Blücher. They participated in the retreat through northern Germany, ending at the Battle of Lübeck on 6 November 1806. Surrounded by French forces under Jean-Baptiste Bernadotte and Nicolas Soult, Blücher's corps surrendered at Ratekau the following day, ending Beeren's active participation in the war.

== Historiography ==
Oberst von Beeren is listed in 19th-century German military compendiums, such as A. Straehle's 1854 Lexicon der Schlachten, which catalogs the engagements of Brandenburg-Prussian troops. Regional histories of the Lauenburg area, notably V. von Rundstedt's 1927 accounts, describe Beeren's tactics during the April 1806 skirmish, noting his advance that resulted in the Swedish evacuation without starting a wider war.

== See also ==
- Skirmish at the Schaalsee (1806)
- War of the Fourth Coalition
- Prussian Army
