= Joseph Christian Lillie =

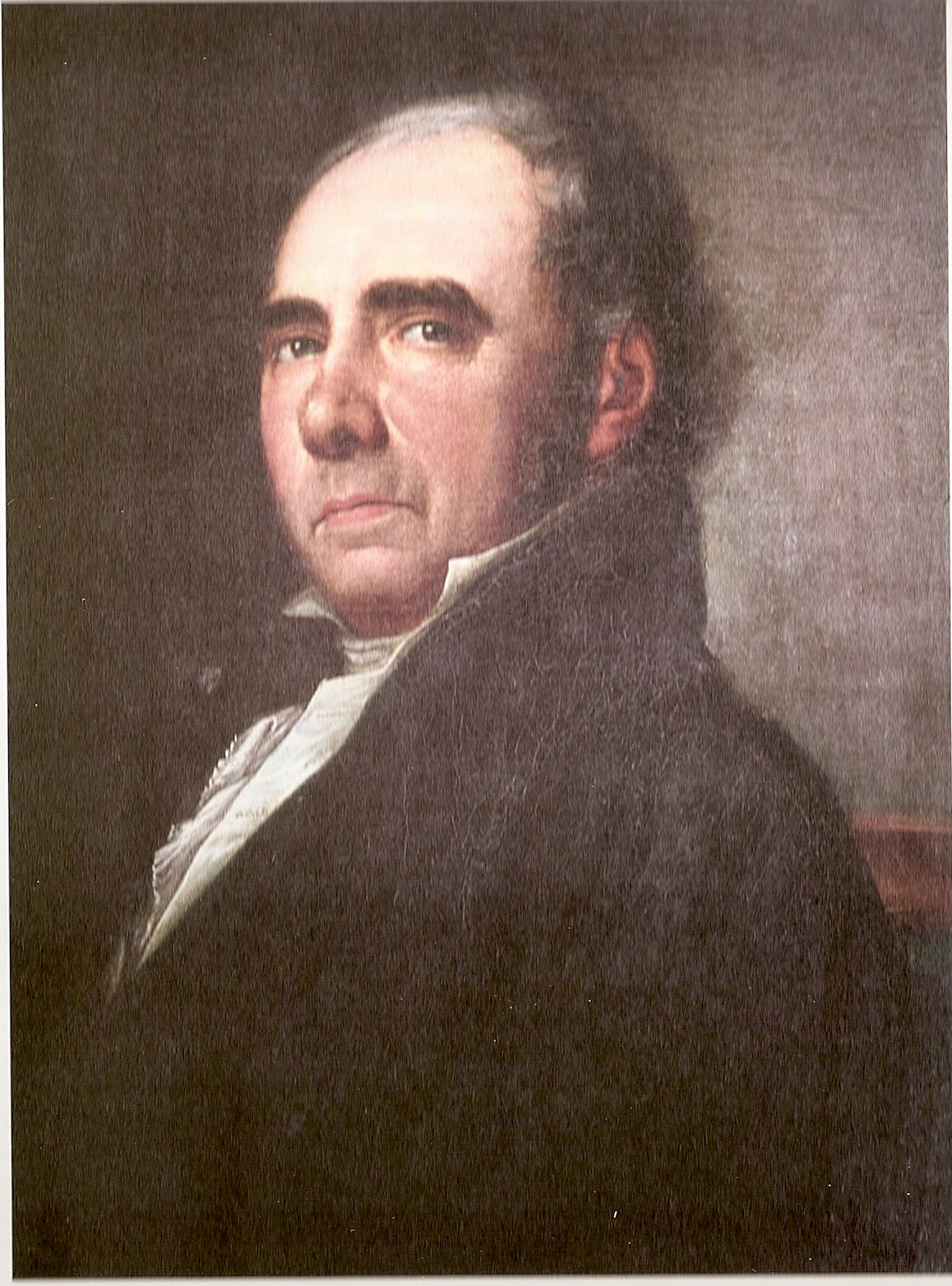
- J. C. Lillie, painted in 1806 by J. B. Hauttmann
- Born: 20 March 1760; Copenhagen, Denmark
- Died: 29 January 1827 (aged 66); Lübeck, Schleswig-Holstein
- Occupation: Architect
- Buildings: Behnhaus, Lübeck; Kurhaus Hotel, Travemünde

Joseph Christian Lillie (20 March 1760 – 29 January 1827), also known as J.C. Lillie, was a Danish neoclassical architect and interior designer. His early career was in Denmark, where he is mainly known for his interior designs and furniture production. His later career was in Schleswig-Holstein, where he is known for his independent architectural works.

== Early life and training ==
Joseph Christian Lillie was born in Copenhagen to the master cabinetmaker Georg Friederich Lillie and his wife, Maria Eva Schils. He is presumed to have trained as a cabinetmaker.

He was educated at the Royal Danish Academy of Art ca. 1774-1780, and was a student of Caspar Frederik Harsdorff, then director of the academy and Denmark's leading architect in the late 18th century and now referred to as “The Father of Danish Classicism”. Lillie won both the academy's "little silver medallion" and the "large silver medallion" in 1775. Later, he won the little gold medallion in 1777, and the large gold medallion in 1779, the same year a fellow architecture student, Christian Frederik Hansen, won a gold medallion. Lillie and Hansen became friends, and Lillie worked closely with him during his career.

== Early career in Denmark ==
Lillie worked as a substitute teacher in the academy's building class 1781-1782, and in 1783 took on a full-time position there as teacher, but never as professor, which meant that he could not become a member of the academy.

In early 1784 the cabinetmaking guild tried to prevent his getting a license to run the family cabinetmaking workshop, which his recently deceased mother had run as a widow after the death of his father. The guild did not recognize him as having guild rights, because he had not received guild recognition for a work submitted for approval. The academy, under Johannes Wiedewelt’s leadership, supported Lillie's request for a trade license as a cabinetmaker in Copenhagen. The Chancellery awarded him all guild rights in 1779 because he had won the academy's large gold medallion. He received his trade license that year, and ran the workshop from 1784 to 1799.

That same year, on Harsdorff's recommendation, he was hired by the new director, Carsten Anker, as inspector and designer at The Royal Furniture Storehouse (Det kongelige Møbelmagasin), replacing Georg Roentgen from Neuwied. The Storehouse was a national institution with the aim of improving domestic furniture production by creating model production facilities, supporting new master craftsmen, and selling furniture in its own store.

He married Rebekka Marie Clausen on 25 June 1784.

His talents were also used for the interior design of apartments at Christiansborg Palace. His first large work was the decoration of the suite at the castle for the newly married Princess Louise Augusta and Christian Friedrich of Augustenborg in 1786.

In 1787 he was cited for neglect of duties as a teacher at the academy, and was refused a travel stipend, which should have been his due as recipient of the gold medallion eight years previously. His fellow gold medallion winner that same year and friend C.F. Hansen had also been refused a travel stipend, but was able to travel on account of a direct financial dispensation from Dowager Queen Juliane Marie and King Christian VII.

In 1788 Lillie applied for the job of city architect in Copenhagen, but to no avail.

He married his second wife Julie Meinier (Meunier) in France.

In 1790 Lillie did the interior design for Crown Prince and Regent Frederik’s apartments both at Christiansborg Palace and at Frederiksberg Palace. On 3 November 1790 he was appointed interior designer to the Danish court.

He travelled in Norway in 1793.

The interior decoration in 1794-1795 of various apartments in Schack's Palace (today commonly referred to as Christian IX's Palace) at Amalienborg, then the home of the Crown Prince and his family, is also attributed to him.

The Christiansborg fire of 1794 destroyed much of his work at the castle, although some individual pieces survived.

== Later career in Lübeck and death ==
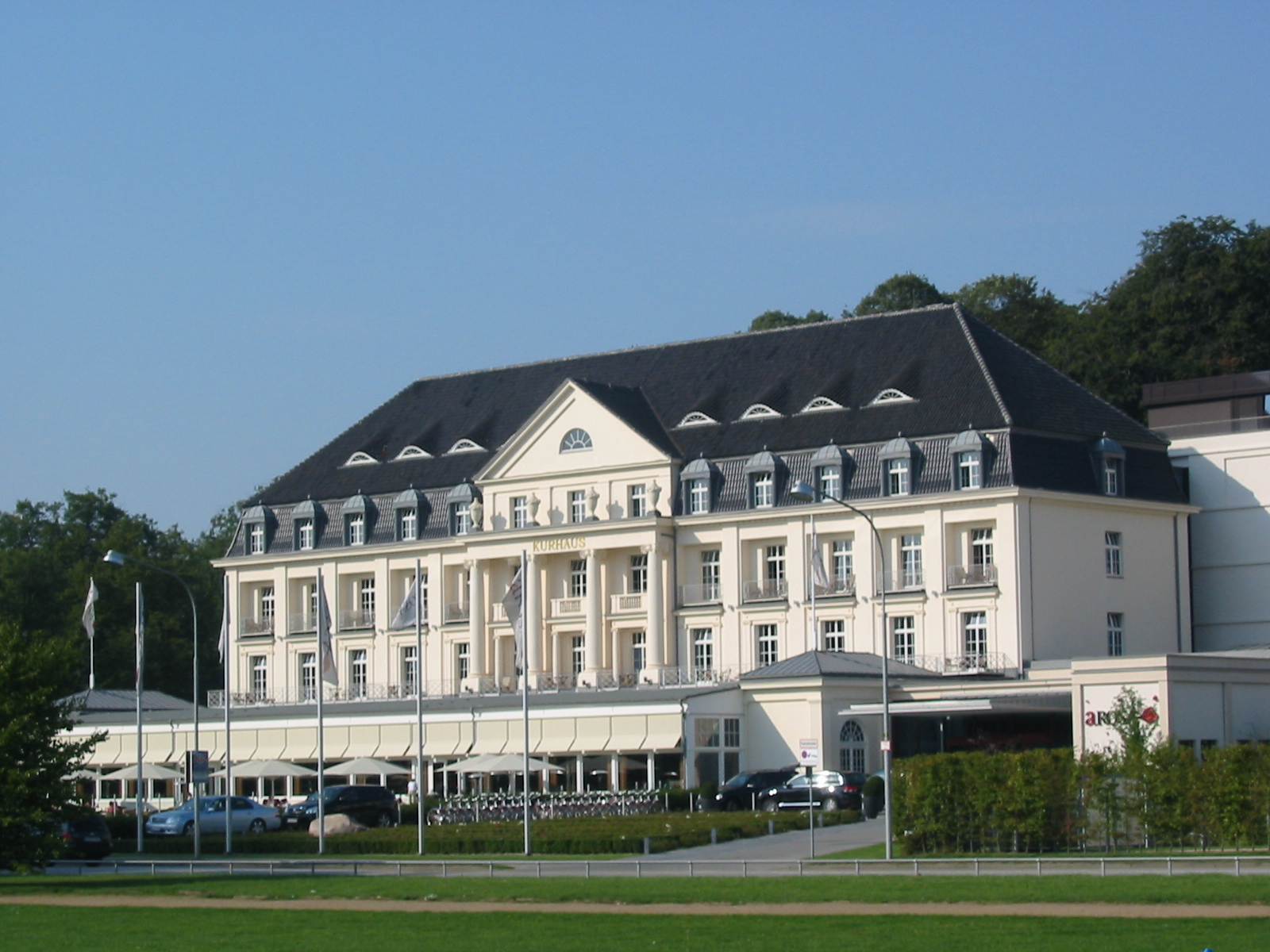
The Kurhaus hotel in Travemünde, designed by Lillie

Economic conditions were hard for artists at the turn of the 19th century, with shriveling funds from the public coffers due to, among other things, the loss of Christiansborg, the setting up of new residences at Amalienborg, and pending war, which took place in the early 19th century. After a bankruptcy in 1798 he left Copenhagen and Denmark, and moved to Lübeck, where the second half of his career began.

His second wife died on 21 July 1804 in Lübeck.

He was resident architect for C.F. Hansen at the establishment of Kastorf and Kramonshagen in Holstein in 1801-1802.

Lillie became the director and a professor of architecture, perspective and geometry at the Freie Zeichenschule, Lübeck in 1804. He continued at the school until 1827.

He lived with Johanna Catharina Haak starting in 1805.

Lillie became Lübeck's chief architect in 1813. He died in Lübeck in 1827 and is buried at St. Jürgen cemetery.

== Other works ==
- Furniture for Marienlyst Castle near Helsingør (1791)
- The interior decoration for Liselund Palace on the Isle of Møn (1792) is attributed to him
- The coffin for Queen Dowager Juliane Marie (1796)
- Interior design of the main building at Brede in Lyngby-Taarbæk (1797)
- Behnhaus in Lübeck, now an art museum including Lillie's interior design (ca. 1800),
- Linde'sche Villa in Lübeck, today the city's wedding registry office. The house and garden are also important in the art of Edvard Munch and later became the domicile of the Munch collector and patron Dr. Max Linde (1804)
- The mausoleum for Hereditary Princess Helene Paulowna, Ludwigslust (1804–1806)
- The first Kurhaus in Travemünde; there are still some elements of his interior decoration in the subsequent building, which reopened as a hotel in 2005 (1819–1820)
- The manor house in Schönfeld near Mühlen Eichsen in Mecklenburg (1820)
- The manor house for the von Bülow family in Gudow near Mölln (1824–1827)
