= Lake Boissow and Lake Neuenkirchen South Nature Reserve =

Nature reserve in Mecklenburg-Vorpommern, Germany

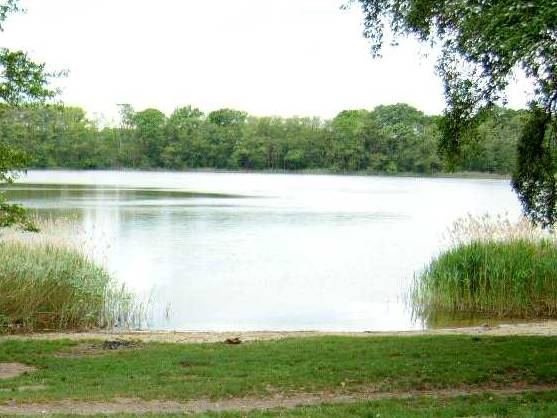
View from the bathing area on Lake Boissow.

The nature reserve of Lake Boissow and Lake Neuenkirchen South (German: Boissower See und Südteil des Neuenkirchener See) lies in the northwest of the district of Ludwigslust-Parchim in the German state of Mecklenburg-Vorpommern in the middle of the Schaalsee Biosphere Reserve.

The nature reserve is part of the Schaalsee European Bird Reserve designated in 1992 (EU No. DE 2231-401). It has an area of c. 86 hectares and incorporates part of the town of Zarrentin am Schaalsee in the local subdistricts (Germarkungen) of Boissow, Techin, Neuhof and Neuenkirchen. The reserve aims to protect and preserve a narrow, partially boggy, erosion valley along Lakes Boissow and Neuenkirchen (Boissower See and Neuenkirchener See), linked by a roughly 250 metre long stream, as well as its associated belt of reeds, forested valley sides, carrs and the moorland and areas of mineral soil used for pasture. The status of the land in the reserve is classified as satisfactory. The intrusion of nutrients from the adjacent agricultural areas and fishing have adverse effects. A footpath along the east shore and an observation tower offer views of the reserve.

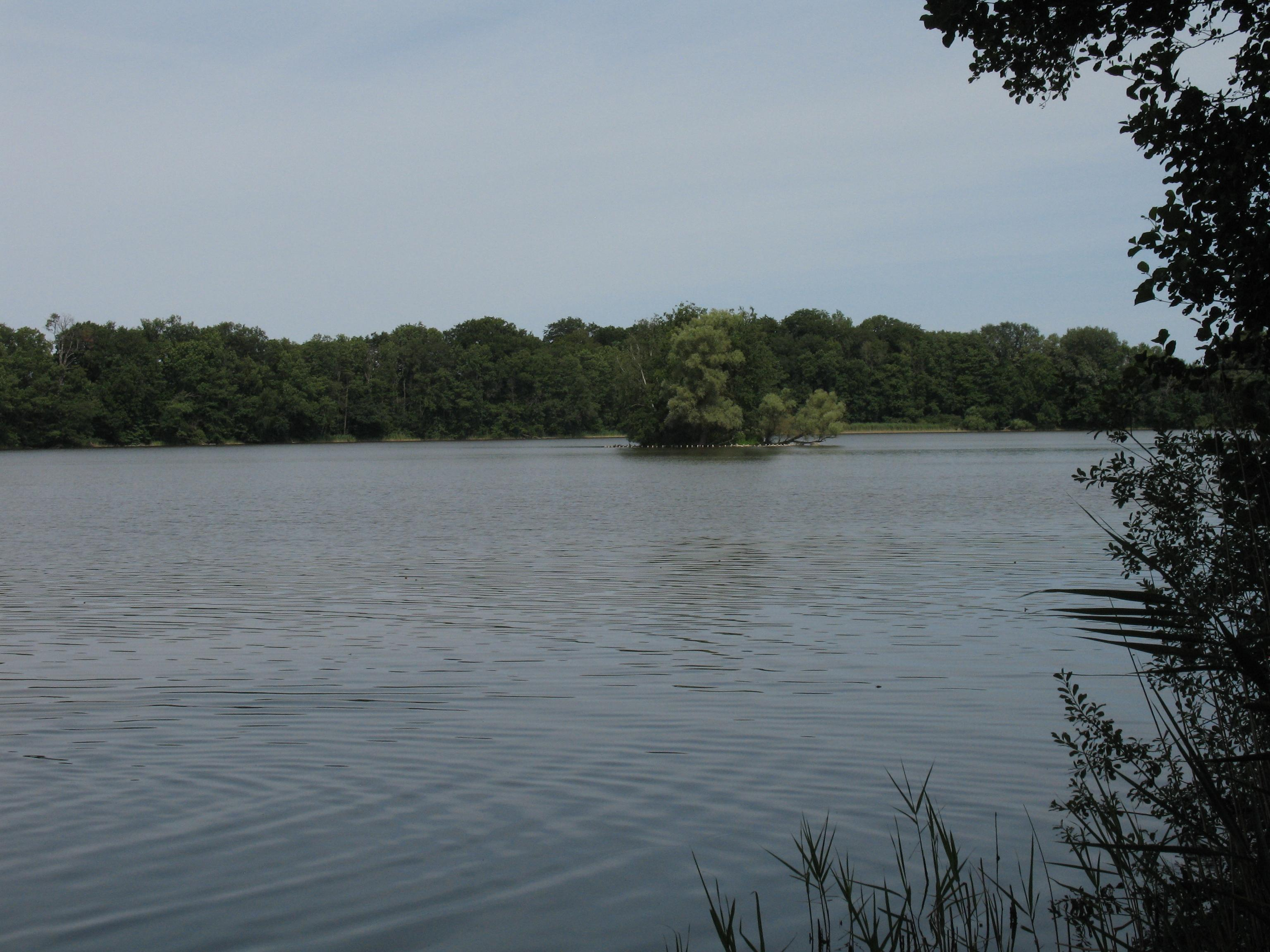
Lake Boissow

== Plants and animals ==
Highly protected bird species here include the bittern, marsh harrier, crane, kingfisher and river warbler as well as the middle spotted woodpecker, red kite, red-backed shrike. The greylag goose, greater white-fronted goose, bean goose and tufted duck are also at home here.

== Literature ==
- Umweltministerium Mecklenburg-Vorpommern, ed. (2003), "Boissower See 316", Die Naturschutzgebiete in Mecklenburg-Vorpommern (in German), Schwerin: Demmler-Verlag, pp. 430f, ISBN 3-910150-52-7
