= Rögnitz =

- Municipality
- Location of Rögnitz within Nordwestmecklenburg district
- Interactive map of Rögnitz
- Location within Germany Location within Mecklenburg-Vorpommern
- Coordinates: 53°37′N 11°01′E
- Country: Germany
- State: Mecklenburg-Vorpommern
- District: Nordwestmecklenburg
- Municipal assoc.: Gadebusch

Government
  - Mayor: Gerhard Wilk

Area
  - Total: 11.42 km^{2} (4.41 sq mi)
- Elevation: 51 m (167 ft)

Population (2025-12-31)
  - Total: 188
  - Density: 16.5/km^{2} (42.6/sq mi)
- Time zone: UTC+01:00 (CET)
  - Summer (DST): UTC+02:00 (CEST)
- Postal codes: 19205
- Dialling codes: 038853
- Vehicle registration: NWM
- Website: www.gadebusch.de

Rögnitz (German pronunciation: [ˈʁøːɡnɪts]) is a municipality in the Nordwestmecklenburg district, in Mecklenburg-Vorpommern, Germany.
