= Gadebusch (Amt) =

- Amt
- Map of Nordwestmecklenburg highlighting Gadebusch
- Interactive map of Gadebusch
- Location within Germany Location within Mecklenburg-Vorpommern
- Coordinates: 53°42′N 11°07′E
- Country: Germany
- State: Mecklenburg-Vorpommern
- District: Nordwestmecklenburg
- Seat: Gadebusch
- Subdivisions: 8 municipalities

Area
  - Total: 222.43 km^{2} (85.88 sq mi)

Population (2025-12-31)
  - Total: 9,867
  - Density: 44.36/km^{2} (114.9/sq mi)
- Time zone: UTC+01:00 (CET)
  - Summer (DST): UTC+02:00 (CEST)
- Website: www.gadebusch.de

Gadebusch is an Amt in the district of Nordwestmecklenburg, in Mecklenburg-Vorpommern, Germany. The seat of the Amt is in Gadebusch.

The Amt Gadebusch consists of the following municipalities:

1. Dragun
2. Gadebusch
3. Kneese
4. Krembz
5. Mühlen Eichsen
6. Roggendorf
7. Rögnitz
8. Veelböken
