= Veelböken =

- Municipality
- Location of Veelböken within Nordwestmecklenburg district
- Interactive map of Veelböken
- Location within Germany Location within Mecklenburg-Vorpommern
- Coordinates: 53°45′N 11°10′E
- Country: Germany
- State: Mecklenburg-Vorpommern
- District: Nordwestmecklenburg
- Municipal assoc.: Gadebusch

Government
  - Mayor: Steffen Timm

Area
  - Total: 32.53 km^{2} (12.56 sq mi)
- Elevation: 58 m (190 ft)

Population (2025-12-31)
  - Total: 658
  - Density: 20.2/km^{2} (52.4/sq mi)
- Time zone: UTC+01:00 (CET)
  - Summer (DST): UTC+02:00 (CEST)
- Postal codes: 19205
- Dialling codes: 03886
- Vehicle registration: NWM

Veelböken is a municipality in the Nordwestmecklenburg district, in Mecklenburg-Vorpommern, Germany. It is administered by the Gadebusch Government Office, which is based in the town of Gadebusch.

== History ==
Veelböken belonged to the Duchy of Mecklenburg-Schwerin within the Holy Roman Empire of the German Nation. As of 1819, Veelböken belonged to the Domanialamt Gadebusch-Rhena within Grand Duchy of Mecklenburg-Schwerin as part of the German Confederation, North German Confederation and German Empire.

The municipality of Veelböken lies between Schwerin and Lübeck in a ground moraine area between the rivers Radegast and Stepenitz. Veelböken is surrounded by the neighboring communities of Upahl and Rüting in the north, Mühlen Eichsen in the east, Dragun in the southeast, Gadebusch in the southwest and Wedendorfersee in the northwest. The municipality includes the districts of Botelsdorf, Frauenmark, Hindenberg (formerly also written as Hindeberg), Passow, Passow Ausbau, Paetrow, Rambeel and Veelböken.

The municipality has no officially approved emblem of sovereignty, neither a coat of arms nor a flag. The official seal is the small state seal with the coat of arms of the Mecklenburg region. It shows a bull's head looking down with a torn neck fur and crown and the inscription: "GEMEINDE VEELBÖKEN • LANDKREIS NORDWESTMECKLENBURG".

== Sights ==
- Manor in Veelböken: two-storey plastered building, converted into a retirement and nursing home
- Hindenberg Manor: two-storey brick building from the 19th century, converted several times (1833, 1896)
  - the estates of Hindeberg/Hindenberg, Veelböken and Webelsfelde belonged to the German noble family von Behr.
- Various farmhouses in Passow and Rambeel
