= Schaalsee Biosphere Reserve =

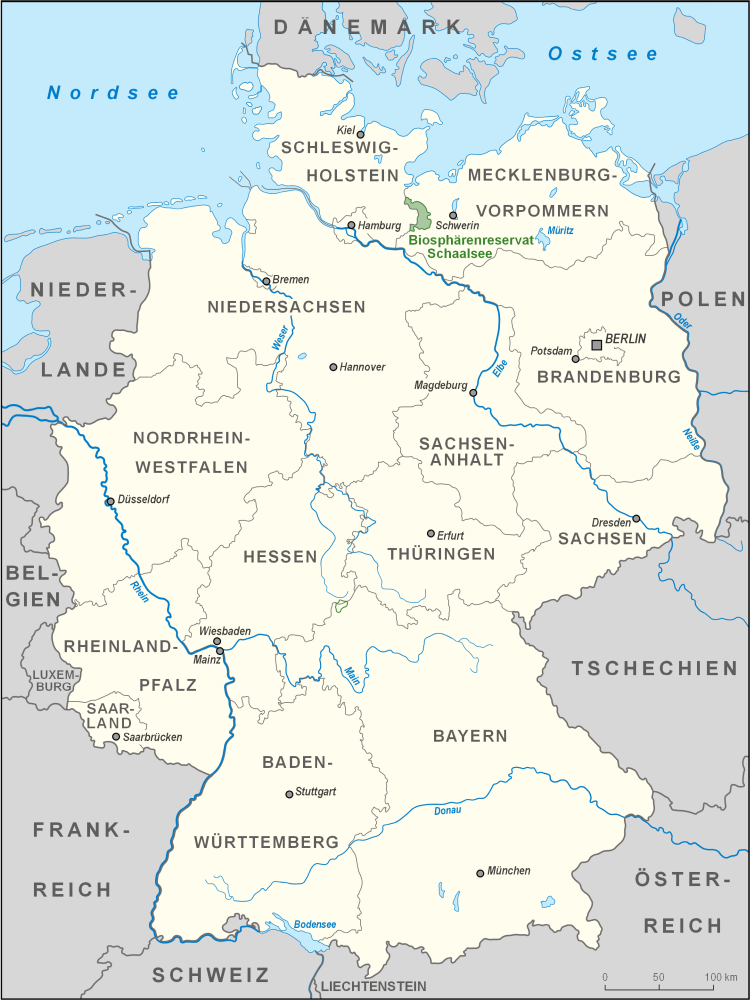
Location

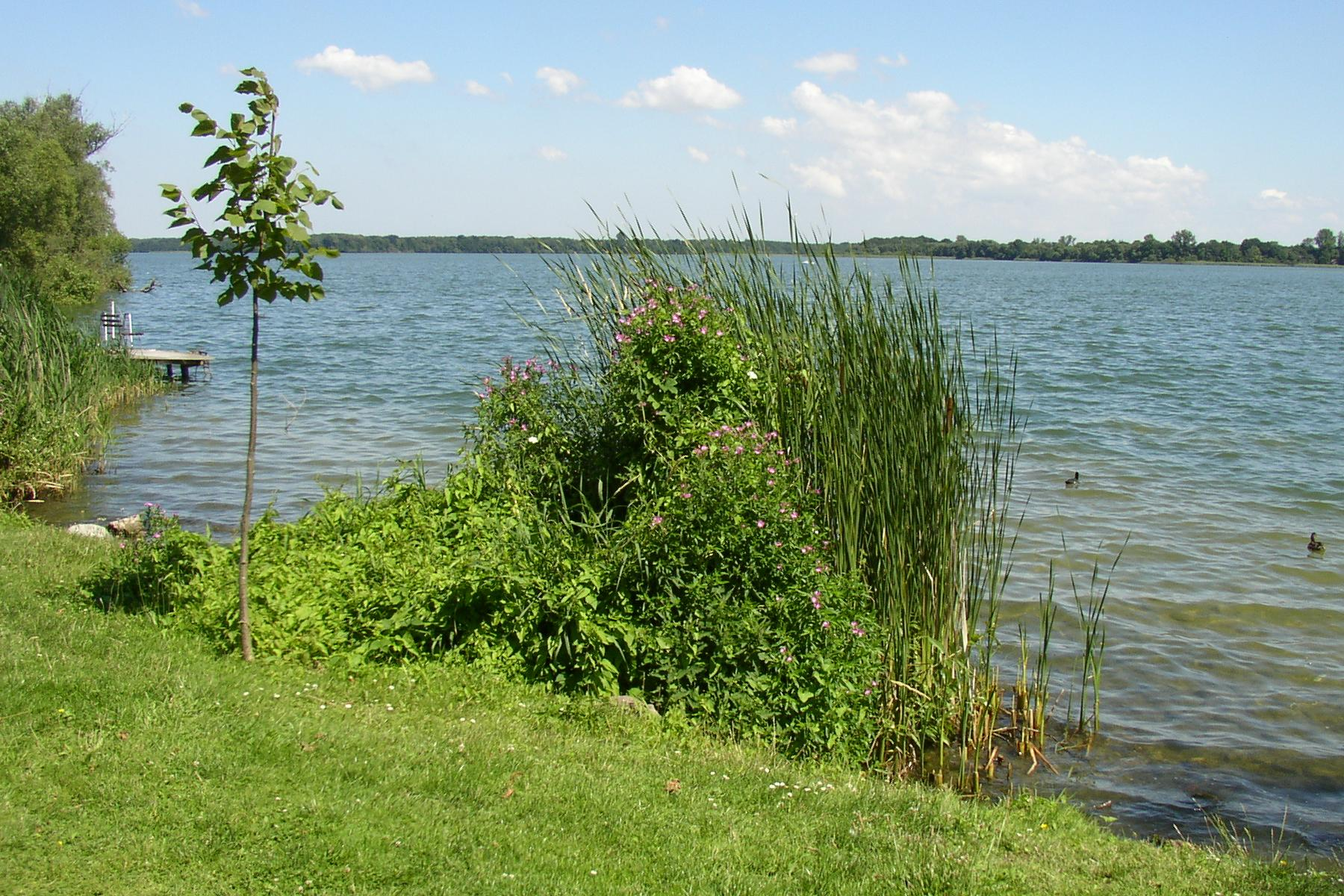
Schaalsee

The Schaalsee Biosphere Reserve (German: Biosphärenreservat Schaalsee) lies in western Mecklenburg-Vorpommern (districts of Nordwestmecklenburg and Ludwigslust-Parchim) on its border with Schleswig-Holstein. From 1952 to 1990 large parts of the Schaalsee landscape lay within the military out of bounds area of the Inner German Border. That state-imposed rest period enabled nature to develop so that in the year 2000 this valuable area was designated as a biosphere reserve. On the Schleswig-Holstein side of the border is the Lauenburg Lakes Nature Park founded in 1961.

== Introduced Rheas ==
An escaped population of greater rhea have become established in the reserve, with several hundred birds in the area. Studies of their ecological effects are ongoing, though damage to crops has been reported.

== Geography ==
The biosphere reserve lies in a young moraine landscape formed in the Weichsel glaciation. To the east is the Baltic Uplands, pierced by the Trave, and which runs across the whole of Mecklenburg.
In the lake of Schaalsee, that gives the reserve its name, are several islands including Kampenwerder, Stintenburginsel and Rethwiese.

== Literature ==
- "Rahmenkonzept (Leitbild) des Biosphärenreservates" (PDF). Amt für das Biosphärenreservat Schaalsee. 2003. p. 59.
