= Dragun =

- Municipality
- Location of Dragun within Nordwestmecklenburg district
- Interactive map of Dragun
- Location within Germany Location within Mecklenburg-Vorpommern
- Coordinates: 53°42′N 11°13′E
- Country: Germany
- State: Mecklenburg-Vorpommern
- District: Nordwestmecklenburg
- Municipal assoc.: Gadebusch

Government
  - Mayor: Sabine Schirrmeister

Area
  - Total: 20.54 km^{2} (7.93 sq mi)
- Elevation: 50 m (160 ft)

Population (2025-12-31)
  - Total: 726
  - Density: 35.3/km^{2} (91.5/sq mi)
- Time zone: UTC+01:00 (CET)
  - Summer (DST): UTC+02:00 (CEST)
- Postal codes: 19205
- Dialling codes: 03886
- Vehicle registration: NWM
- Website: www.gadebusch.de

Dragun is a municipality in the Nordwestmecklenburg district, in Mecklenburg-Vorpommern, Germany.
