= Lauenburg Lakes Nature Park =

Nature park in Schleswig-Holstein, Germany

Coordinates: 53°38′N 10°47′E

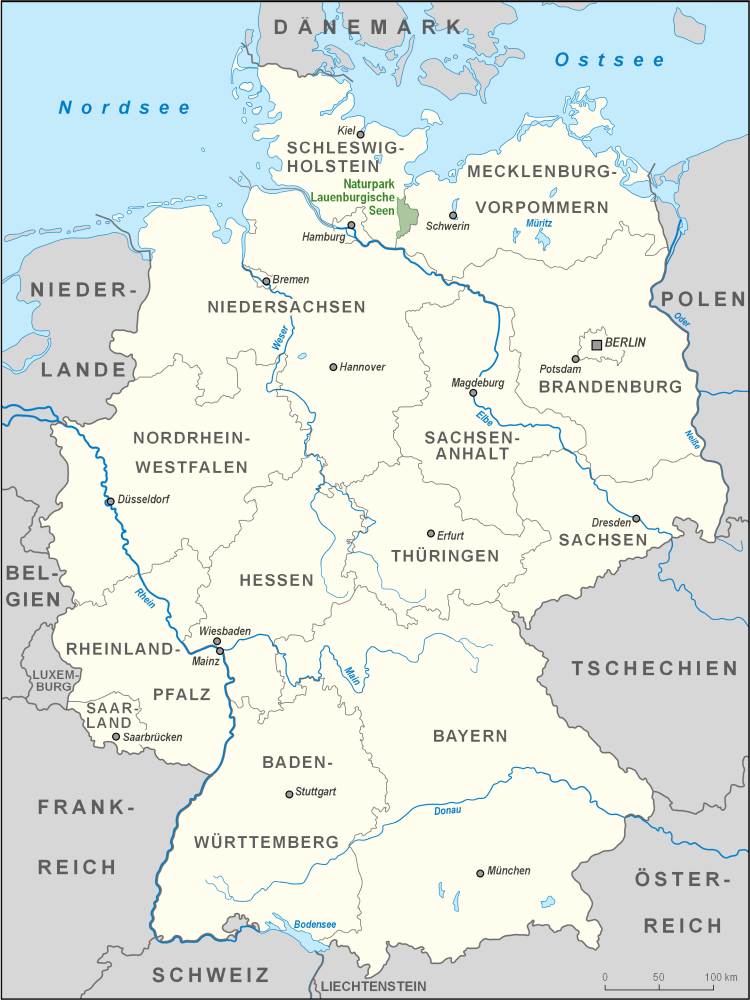
Location of the Lauenburg Lakes Nature Park

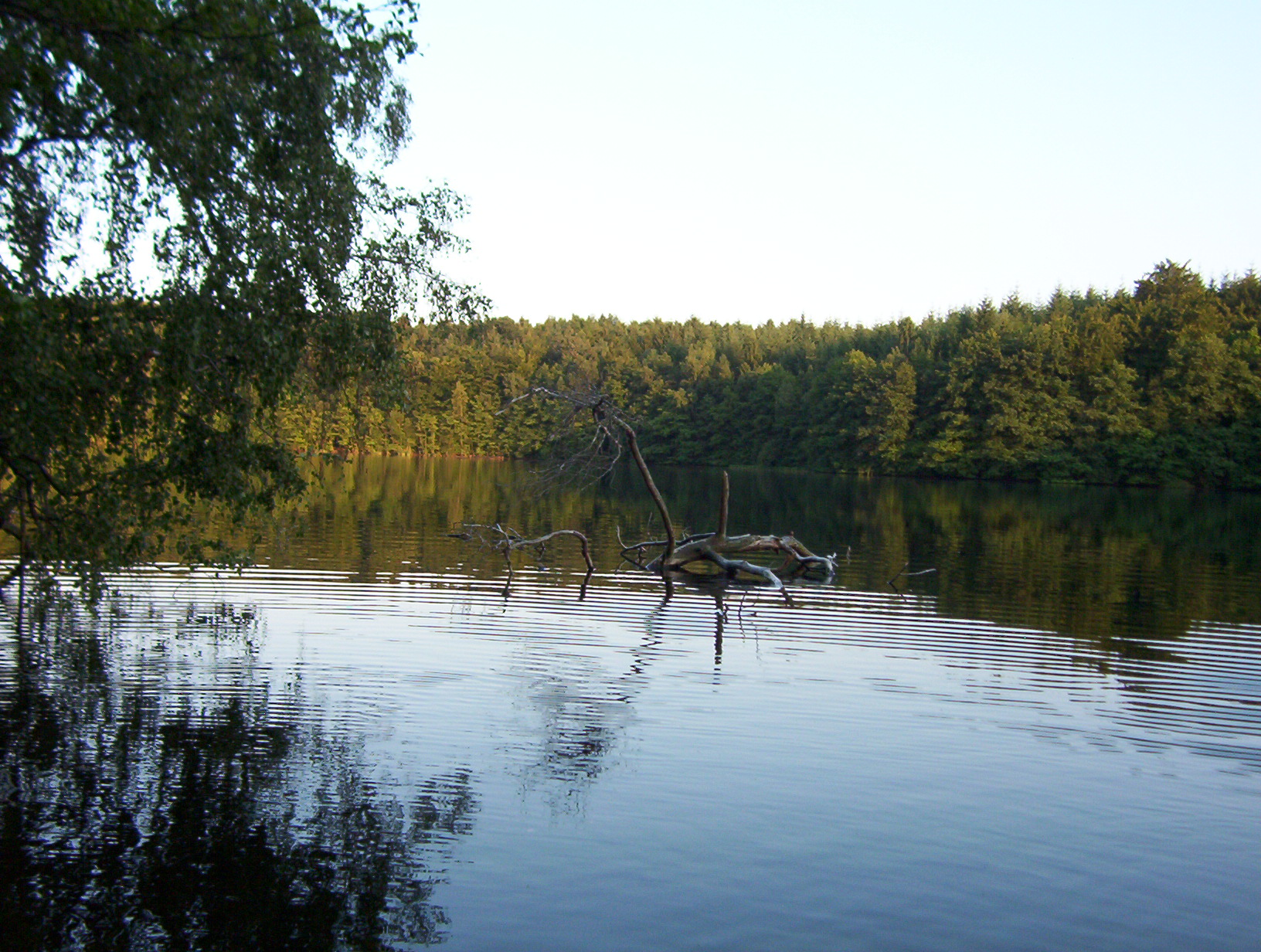
Pinnsee

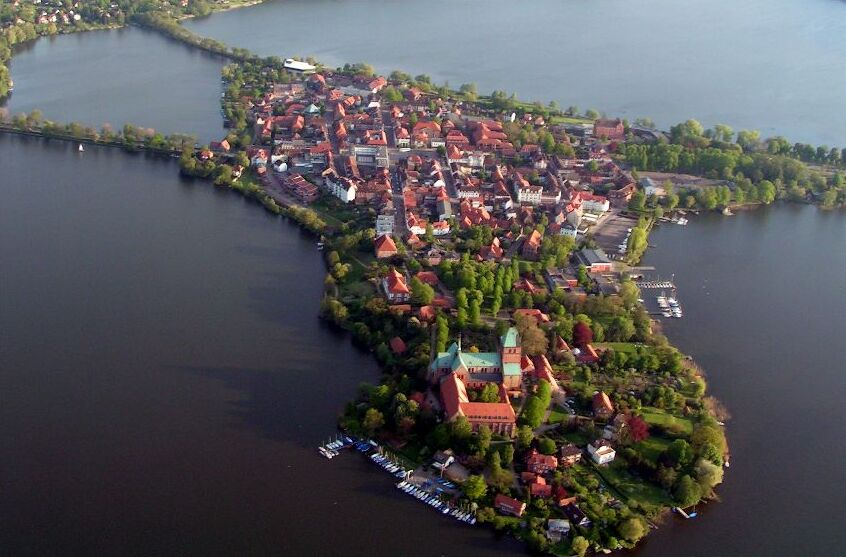
Ratzeburg

The Lauenburg Lakes Nature Park (German: Naturpark Lauenburgische Seen) was founded in 1961 (64 years ago) and lies in the district of Lauenburg in the southeastern part of the German state of Schleswig-Holstein. It is right on the border with the state of Mecklenburg-Vorpommern in the Schleswig-Holstein Uplands, a Young Drift moraine landscape that formed during the Weichselian glaciation of the last ice age.

== Location and significance ==
With an area of over 470 km^{2} (180 sq mi), the nature park is the third largest in Schleswig-Holstein and contains extensive stretches of forest. The Lauenburg Lakes Nature Park, there are 40 lakes in total, borders directly on the Mecklenburg biosphere reserve of Schaalsee and, together, they form a large nature reserve along the former Inner German Border.

The largest lakes in the nature park are the Ratzeburger See and the Schaalsee, which are linked together by the Schaalsee Canal that begins near Salem.

Within the nature park are the district towns of Ratzeburg and Mölln as well as the Hellbach Valley. The Old Salt Road from Lüneburg to Lübeck runs through the nature park – at several places, such as Fredeburg, still as a medieval route - the Alte Salzstraße. The nature park is roughly bordered to the west between Berkenthin and Büchen by the Elbe-Lübeck Canal. The Naturparkweg nature trail runs through the park and links it to the other four nature parks in Schleswig-Holstein.

The watershed between the North and Baltic Seas also runs through the nature park.

== See also ==
- Other lakes in the nature park: Behlendorfer See | Garrensee | Pinnsee
- List of nature parks in Germany
