= Roggendorf =

- Municipality
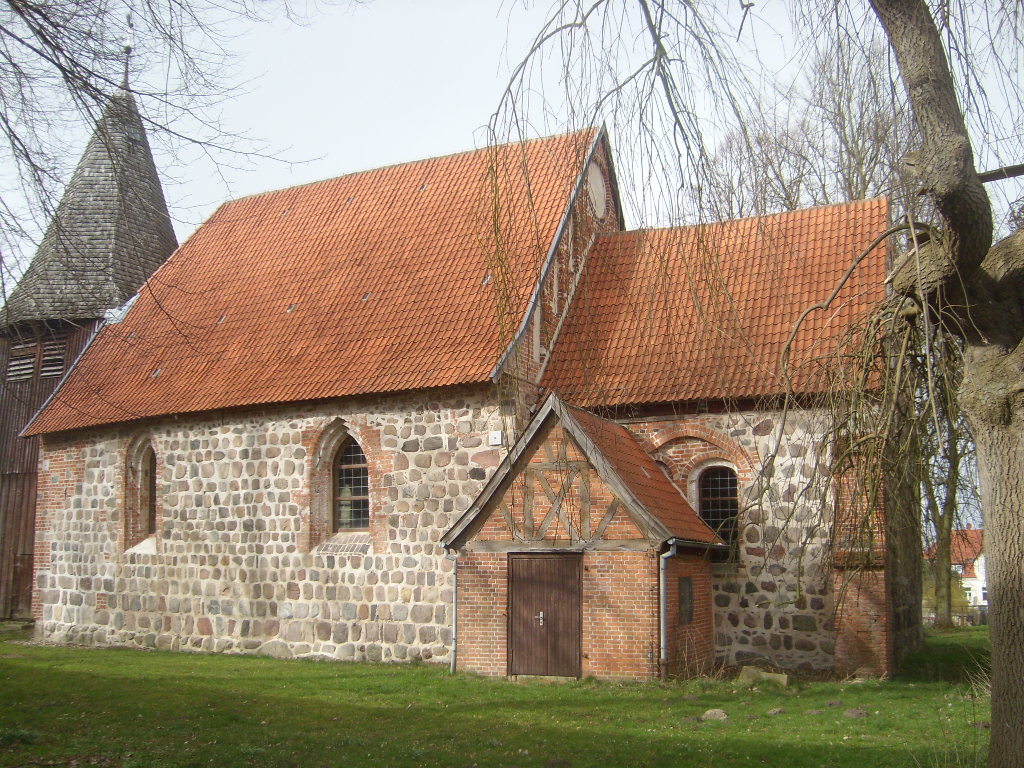
- Medieval church in Roggendorf

- Location of Roggendorf within Nordwestmecklenburg district
- Interactive map of Roggendorf
- Location within Germany Location within Mecklenburg-Vorpommern
- Coordinates: 53°42′N 11°01′E
- Country: Germany
- State: Mecklenburg-Vorpommern
- District: Nordwestmecklenburg
- Municipal assoc.: Gadebusch

Government
  - Mayor: Rico Greger

Area
  - Total: 31.13 km^{2} (12.02 sq mi)
- Elevation: 48 m (157 ft)

Population (2025-12-31)
  - Total: 975
  - Density: 31.3/km^{2} (81.1/sq mi)
- Time zone: UTC+01:00 (CET)
  - Summer (DST): UTC+02:00 (CEST)
- Postal codes: 19205
- Dialling codes: 038876
- Vehicle registration: NWM

Roggendorf is a municipality in the Nordwestmecklenburg district, in Mecklenburg-Vorpommern, Germany.
