= Kneese =

- Municipality
- Location of Kneese within Nordwestmecklenburg district
- Interactive map of Kneese
- Location within Germany Location within Mecklenburg-Vorpommern
- Coordinates: 53°38′N 10°58′E
- Country: Germany
- State: Mecklenburg-Vorpommern
- District: Nordwestmecklenburg
- Municipal assoc.: Gadebusch

Government
  - Mayor: Hans-Jürgen Hoffmann

Area
  - Total: 15.89 km^{2} (6.14 sq mi)
- Elevation: 58 m (190 ft)

Population (2025-12-31)
  - Total: 329
  - Density: 20.7/km^{2} (53.6/sq mi)
- Time zone: UTC+01:00 (CET)
  - Summer (DST): UTC+02:00 (CEST)
- Postal codes: 19205
- Dialling codes: 038876
- Vehicle registration: NWM

Kneese is a municipality in the south west of the Nordwestmecklenburg district, in the Federal State of Mecklenburg-Vorpommern, Germany. The municipality is governed by the government office Gadebusch in the city Gadebusch.

== Geography ==
The municipality Kneese is located close to the border of the Federal State of Schleswig-Holstein in the hilly regions between Gadebusch and the lake Schaalsee. The border line passes the Bernstorfer pond and the Niendorfer pond. Both ponds are part of the lake Schaalsees. The region around Kneese is part of the biosphere reserve Schaalsee which is certified by the UNESCO. In the south the municipality is bordered to the district Ludwigslust.

The villages Dutzow and Sandfeld are part of the municipality.
