= Krembz =

- Municipality
- Location of Krembz within Nordwestmecklenburg district
- Interactive map of Krembz
- Location within Germany Location within Mecklenburg-Vorpommern
- Coordinates: 53°38′N 11°04′E
- Country: Germany
- State: Mecklenburg-Vorpommern
- District: Nordwestmecklenburg
- Municipal assoc.: Gadebusch

Government
  - Mayor: Werner Guschewski

Area
  - Total: 39.06 km^{2} (15.08 sq mi)
- Elevation: 60 m (200 ft)

Population (2025-12-31)
  - Total: 850
  - Density: 22/km^{2} (56/sq mi)
- Time zone: UTC+01:00 (CET)
  - Summer (DST): UTC+02:00 (CEST)
- Postal codes: 19205
- Dialling codes: 03886, 038876, 038853
- Vehicle registration: NWM

Krembz is a municipality in the Nordwestmecklenburg district, in Mecklenburg-Vorpommern, Germany.
