= Schleswig-Holstein Uplands =

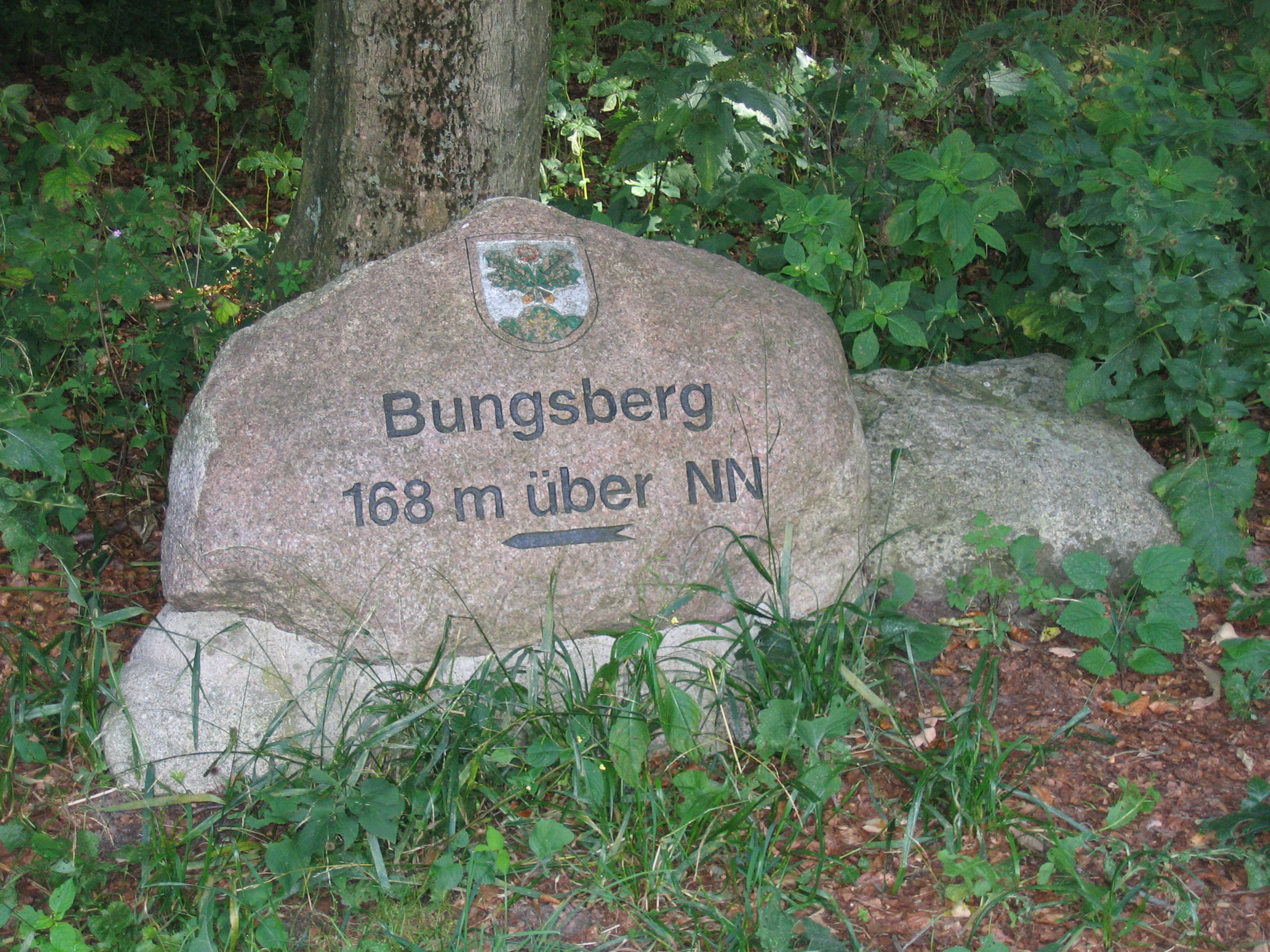
Signpost to the Bungsberg

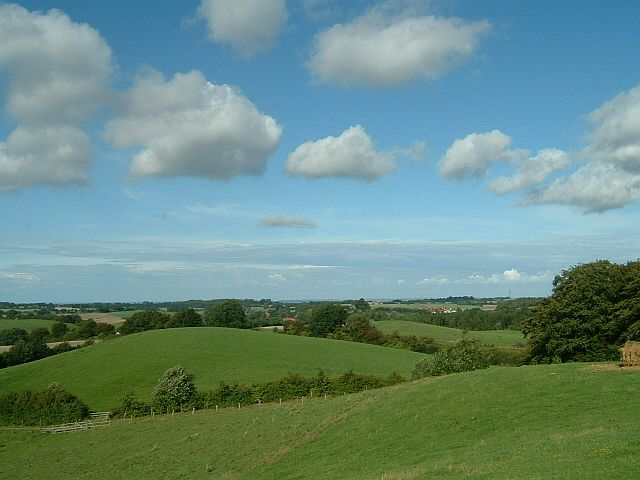
View from the Bungsberg across the upland

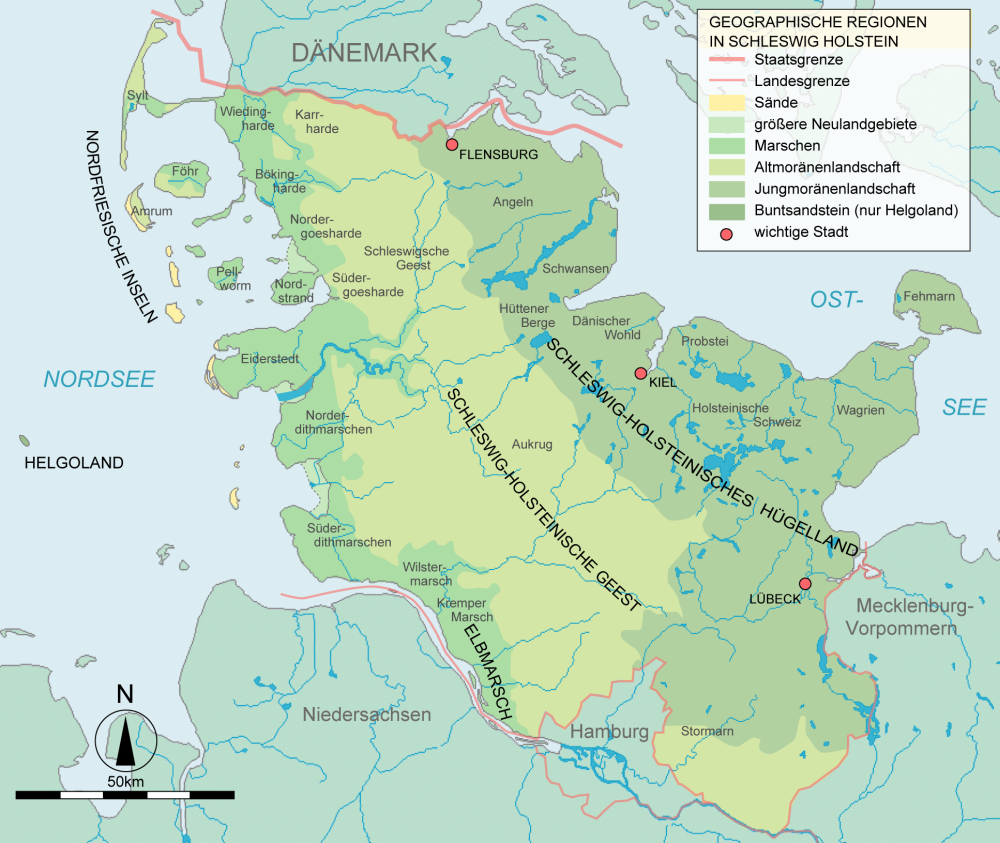
Landscapes in Schleswig-Holstein

The Schleswig-Holstein Uplands or Schleswig-Holstein Morainic Uplands (German: Schleswig-Holsteinisches Hügelland) is one of the three landscapes of the German state of Schleswig-Holstein; the others being the marsch (on the North Sea coast) and the geest (in the interior). It is the landform along the eastern side of the peninsular, which features the gently rolling hills or Hügelland of the Baltic Uplands, and the many small lakes and the long, deep embayments (Förde) formed by the moraines of the Weichselian Ice Age. Its best-known towns are Kiel, Lübeck and Flensburg. The highest elevation in the area is the Bungsberg in the region known as Holstein Switzerland (Holsteinische Schweiz). On the Bungsberg is the only ski lift in the state (not permanently installed).

The Schleswig-Holstein Upland comprises the following sub-regions:

- Angeln
- Schwansen
- Hütten Hills
- Danish Wahld
- Wagria including Holstein Switzerland
- Lauenburg Lakes

== See also ==
- Hageland
