= Pinnsee =

Lake in Herzogtum Lauenburg, Schleswig-Holstein, Germany

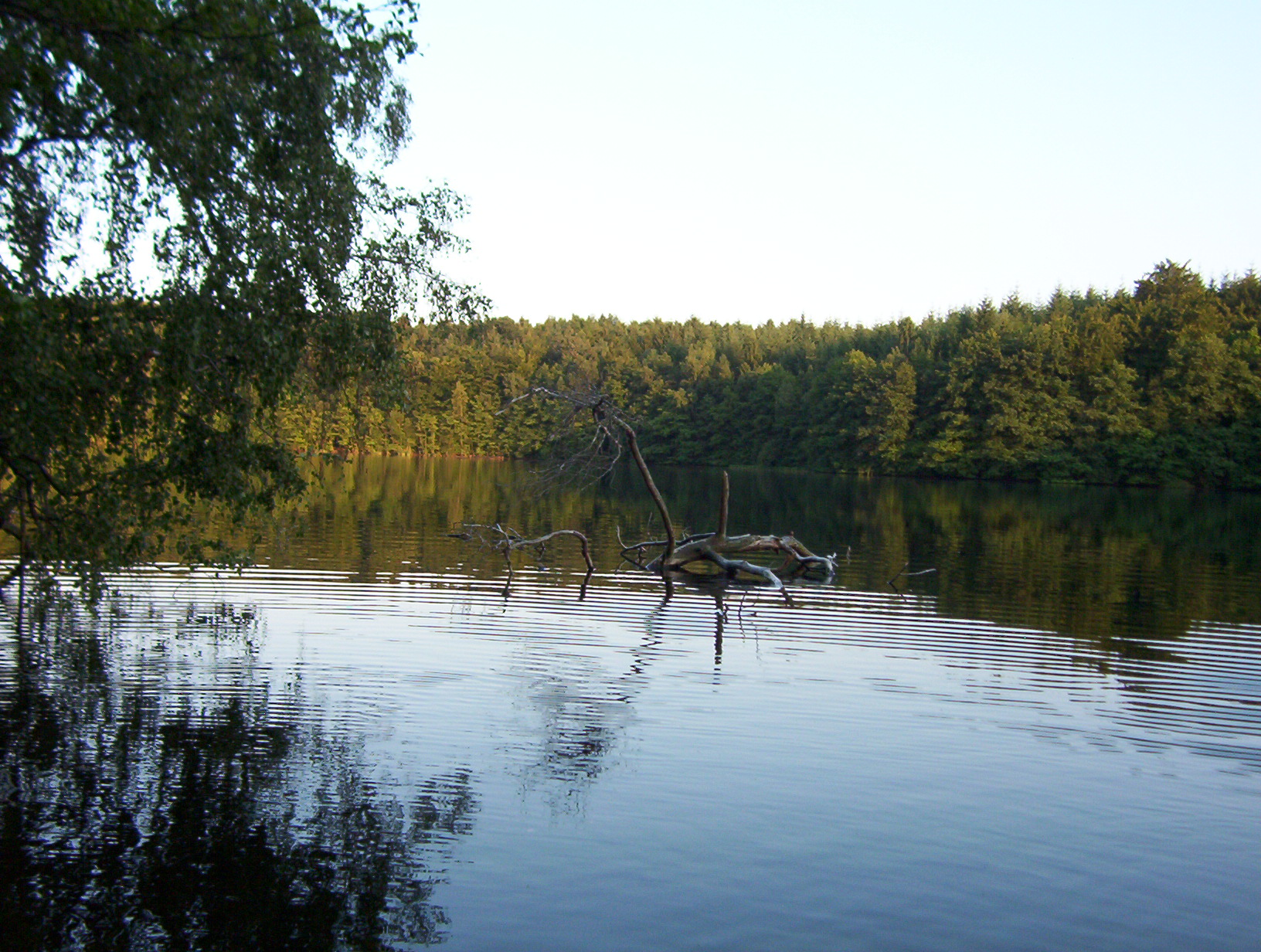

- Location within Schleswig-Holstein
- Location: Kreis Herzogtum Lauenburg, Schleswig-Holstein
- Coordinates: 53°38′3″N 10°44′21″E
- Basin countries: Germany
- Surface area: 0.025 km^{2} (0.0097 sq mi)

Pinnsee is a lake in Kreis Herzogtum Lauenburg, Schleswig-Holstein, Germany. At an elevation of 29.3 to 29.5 meters above sea level, its surface area is 2.5 ha.
