= Mühlen Eichsen =

- Municipality
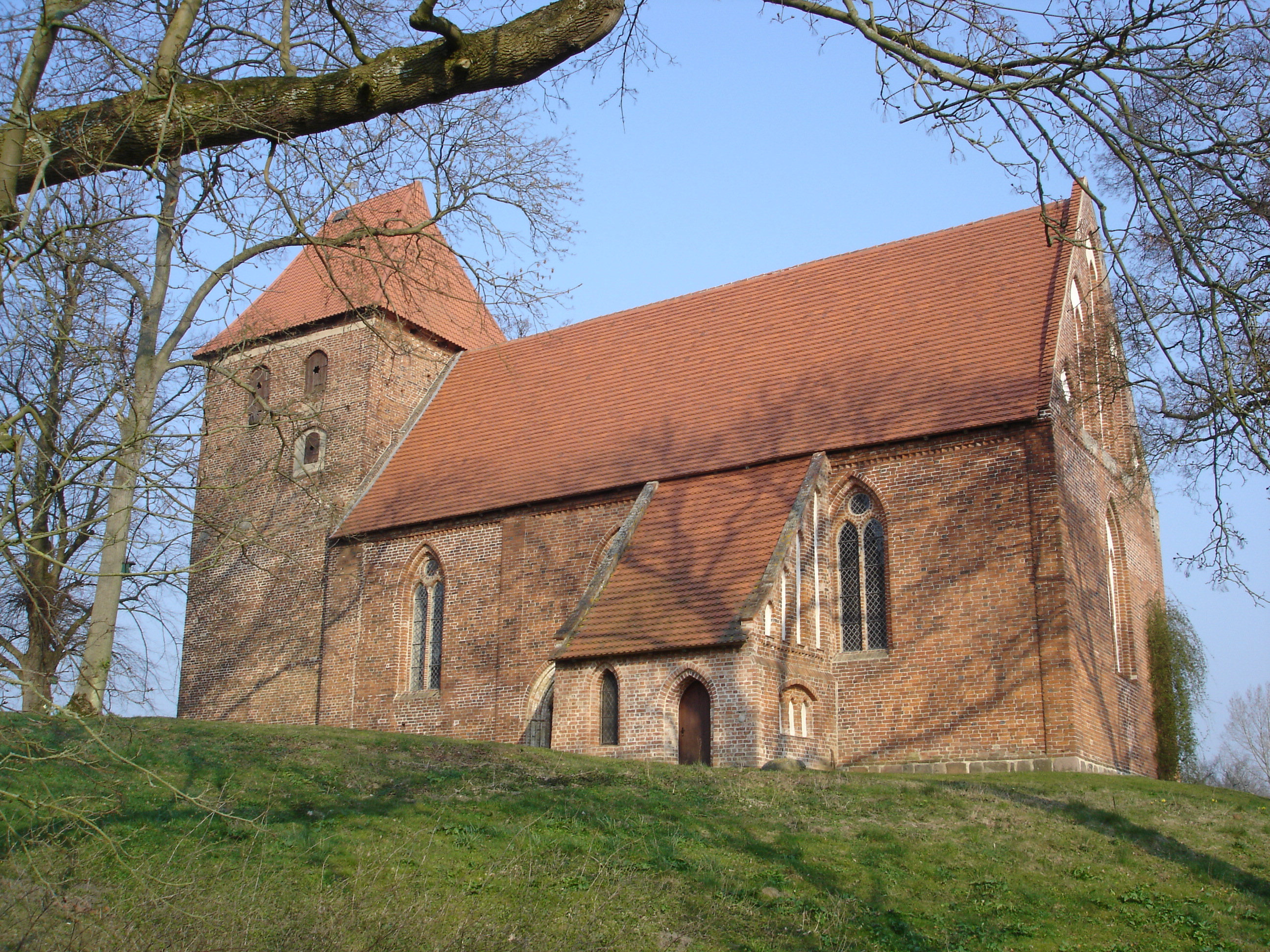
- Church in Mühlen Eichsen

- Location of Mühlen Eichsen within Nordwestmecklenburg district
- Interactive map of Mühlen Eichsen
- Location within Germany Location within Mecklenburg-Vorpommern
- Coordinates: 53°46′N 11°15′E
- Country: Germany
- State: Mecklenburg-Vorpommern
- District: Nordwestmecklenburg
- Municipal assoc.: Gadebusch

Government
  - Mayor: Jürgen Ahrens

Area
  - Total: 23.69 km^{2} (9.15 sq mi)
- Elevation: 54 m (177 ft)

Population (2025-12-31)
  - Total: 952
  - Density: 40.2/km^{2} (104/sq mi)
- Time zone: UTC+01:00 (CET)
  - Summer (DST): UTC+02:00 (CEST)
- Postal codes: 19205
- Dialling codes: 038871
- Vehicle registration: NWM

Mühlen Eichsen is a municipality in the Nordwestmecklenburg district, in Mecklenburg-Vorpommern, Germany.

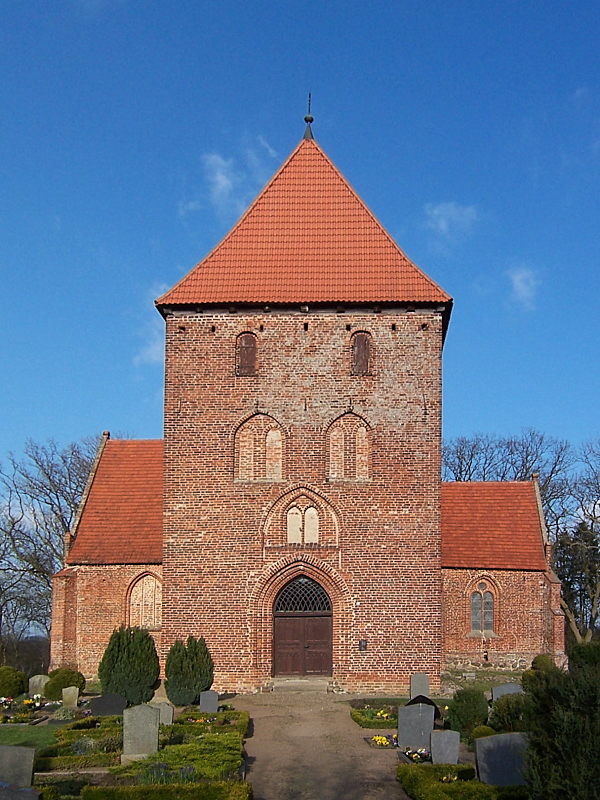
Kirche in Groß Eichsen
