= Behnhaus =

Art museum in Germany

Coordinates: 53°52′12″N 10°41′23″E

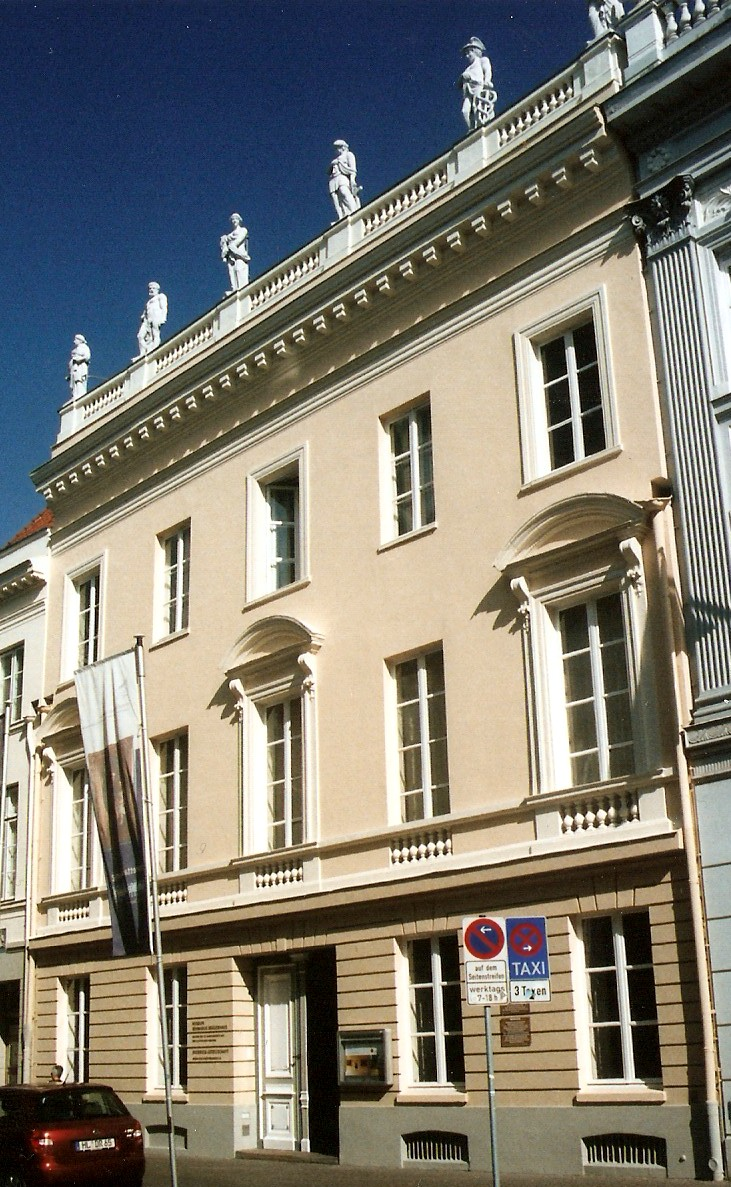
The Behnhaus (2009)

The Behnhaus is an art museum in the Hanseatic city of Lübeck, Germany, and part of its World Heritage Site.

The Behnhaus as a structure is a neoclassical building with interior design by the Danish architect Joseph Christian Lillie. The museum exhibits furniture from this period, and paintings and sculptures from this period onwards. It specializes in Nazarene art, since Friedrich Overbeck was born in Lübeck.

The museum is also known for its collection of works by Edvard Munch.
