= Seedorf, Lauenburg =

Seedorf
- Municipality
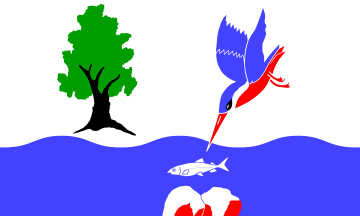
- Flag Coat of arms

- Location of Seedorf within Herzogtum Lauenburg district
- Interactive map of Seedorf
- Location within Germany Location within Schleswig-Holstein
- Coordinates: 53°37′N 10°52′E
- Country: Germany
- State: Schleswig-Holstein
- District: Herzogtum Lauenburg
- Municipal assoc.: Lauenburgische Seen

Government
  - Mayor: Detlef Rodust

Area
  - Total: 27.88 km^{2} (10.76 sq mi)
- Elevation: 45 m (148 ft)

Population (2025-12-31)
  - Total: 583
  - Density: 20.9/km^{2} (54.2/sq mi)
- Time zone: UTC+01:00 (CET)
  - Summer (DST): UTC+02:00 (CEST)
- Postal codes: 23883
- Dialling codes: 04545
- Vehicle registration: RZ
- Website: www.amt- lauenburgische- seen.de

Seedorf (German pronunciation: [ˈzeːdɔʁf]) is a municipality in the district of Lauenburg, in Schleswig-Holstein, Germany.
