= Schaalsee =

Lake in Schleswig-Holstein and Mecklenburg-Vorpommern, Germany

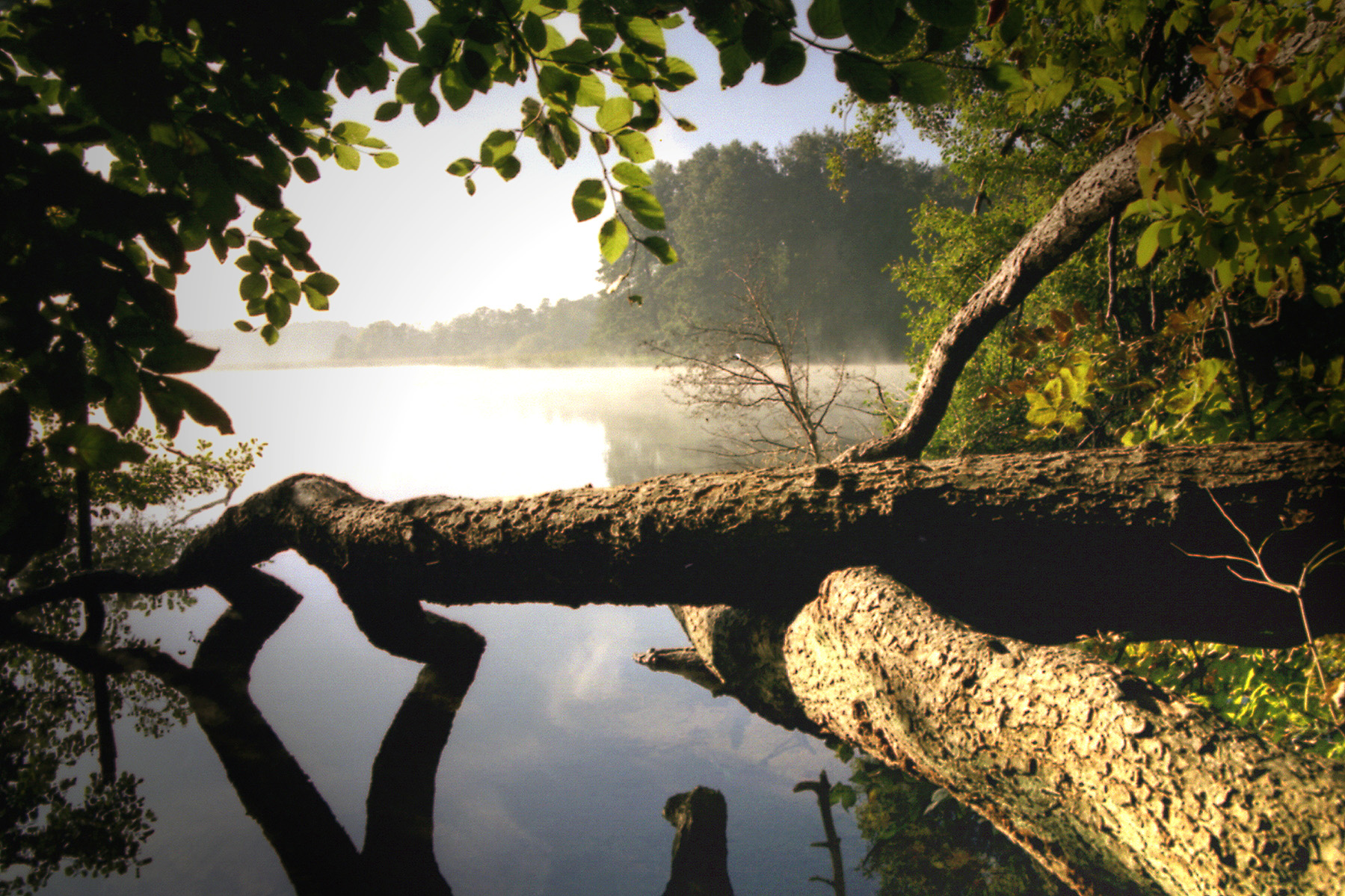

- Location within Schleswig-Holstein
- Location: Schleswig-Holstein and Mecklenburg-Vorpommern
- Coordinates: 53°35′25″N 10°54′52″E
- Primary outflows: Schaalsee-Kanal, Schaale
- Catchment area: 180 km^{2} (69 sq mi)
- Basin countries: Germany
- Surface area: 23.5 km^{2} (9.1 sq mi)
- Average depth: 17 m (56 ft)
- Max. depth: 71.5 m (235 ft)
- Residence time: 5 to 10 years
- Surface elevation: 35 m (115 ft)
- Islands: (Kampenwerder, Stintenburginsel, Rethwiese)
- Settlements: Zarrentin, Seedorf

Schaalsee (German pronunciation: [ˈʃaːlˌzeː]) is a 24 km^{2} (9.3 sq mi) lake in Germany. It forms part of the border between Schleswig-Holstein (district Herzogtum Lauenburg) and Mecklenburg-Vorpommern (districts Ludwigslust-Parchim and Nordwestmecklenburg). The town of Zarrentin is located on its southern shores. Other municipalities on the lake are Seedorf, Sterley, Salem, Kittlitz and Kneese.

It was declared a biosphere reserve in 2000 (309 km^{2}).

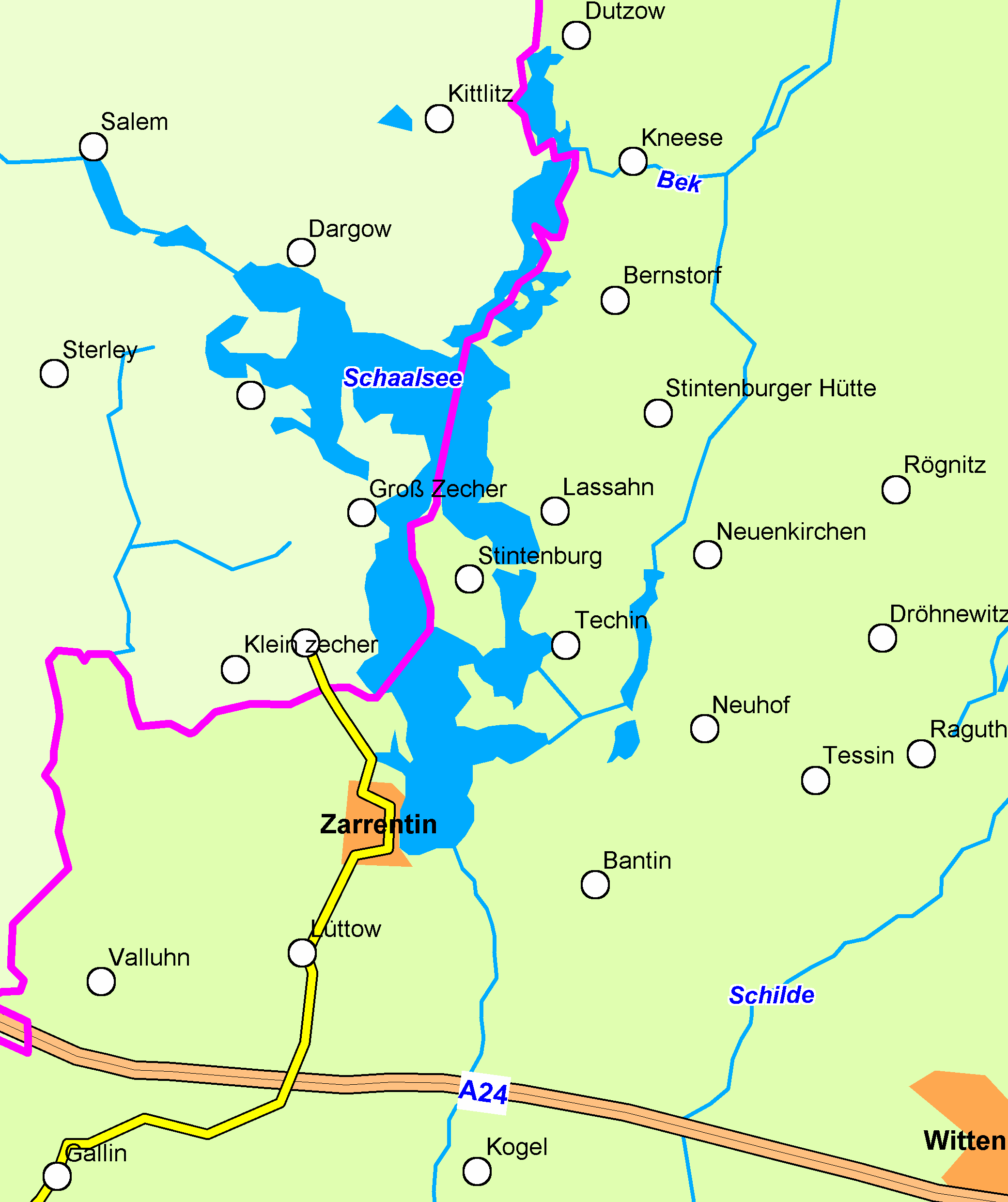
Map of the Schaalsee
