= Zarrentin am Schaalsee =

Town in Mecklenburg-Vorpommern, Germany

- Town
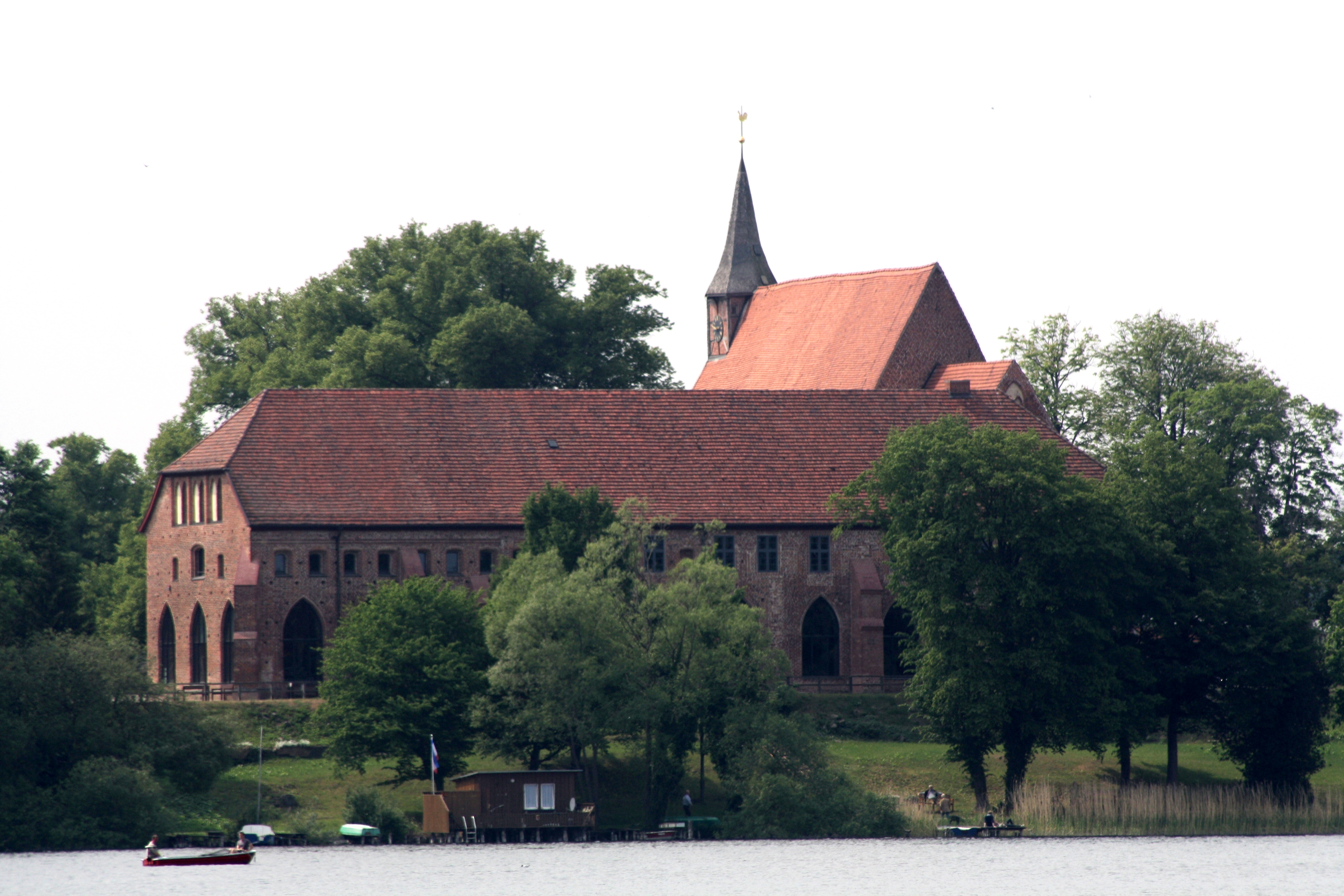
- Monastery seen from the Schaalsee

- Coat of arms

- Location of Zarrentin am Schaalsee within Ludwigslust-Parchim district
- Interactive map of Zarrentin am Schaalsee
- Location within Germany Location within Mecklenburg-Vorpommern
- Coordinates: 53°32′N 10°55′E
- Country: Germany
- State: Mecklenburg-Vorpommern
- District: Ludwigslust-Parchim
- Municipal assoc.: Zarrentin
- Subdivisions: 12

Government
  - Mayor: Klaus Draeger

Area
  - Total: 91.91 km^{2} (35.49 sq mi)
- Elevation: 40 m (130 ft)

Population (2025-12-31)
  - Total: 5,303
  - Density: 57.70/km^{2} (149.4/sq mi)
- Time zone: UTC+01:00 (CET)
  - Summer (DST): UTC+02:00 (CEST)
- Postal codes: 19246
- Dialling codes: 038851
- Vehicle registration: LWL
- Website: www.zarrentin.de

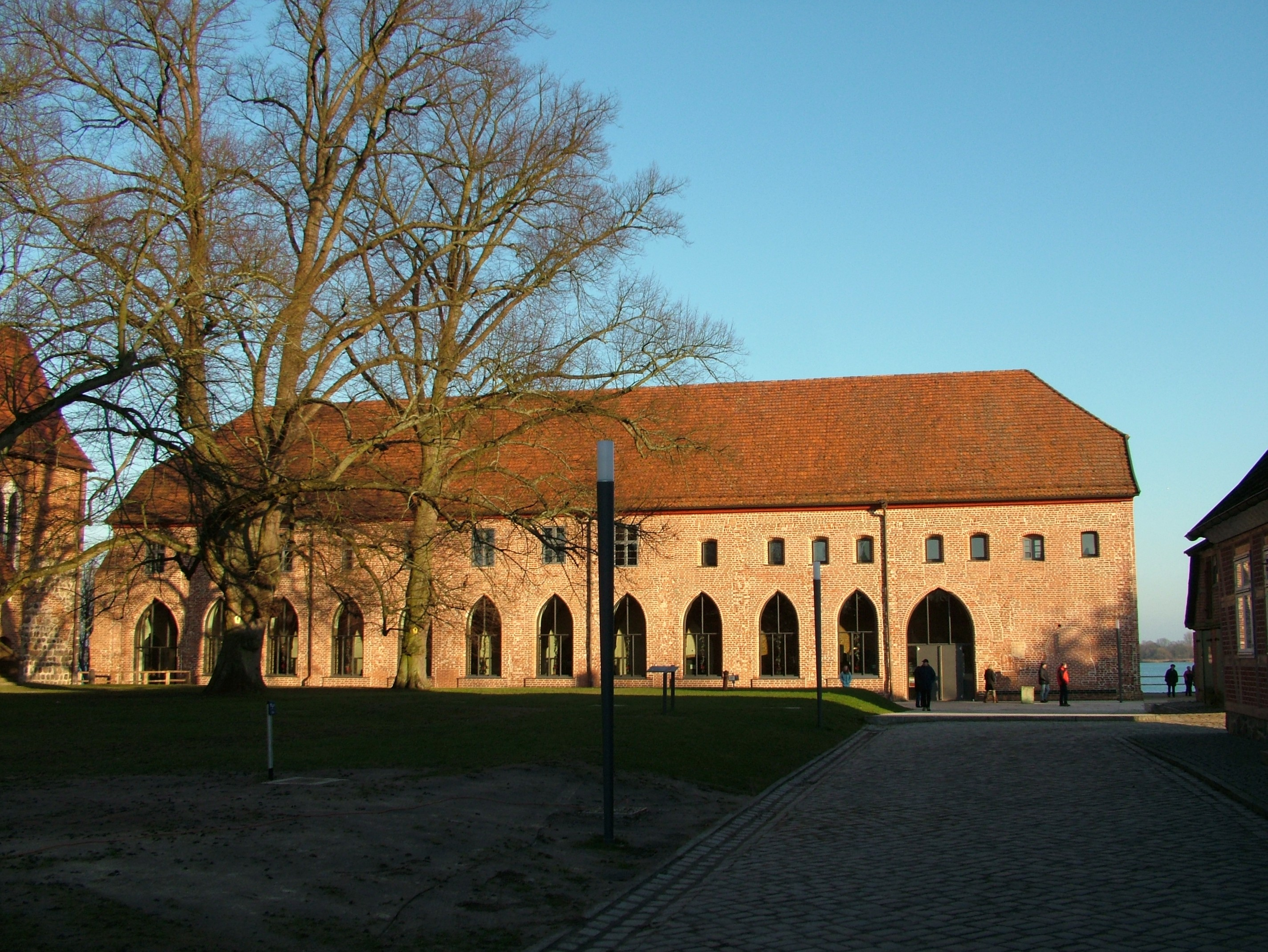
Examination building of a former monastery, today the building serves as the seat of Zarrentin, a museum, library and an event hall.

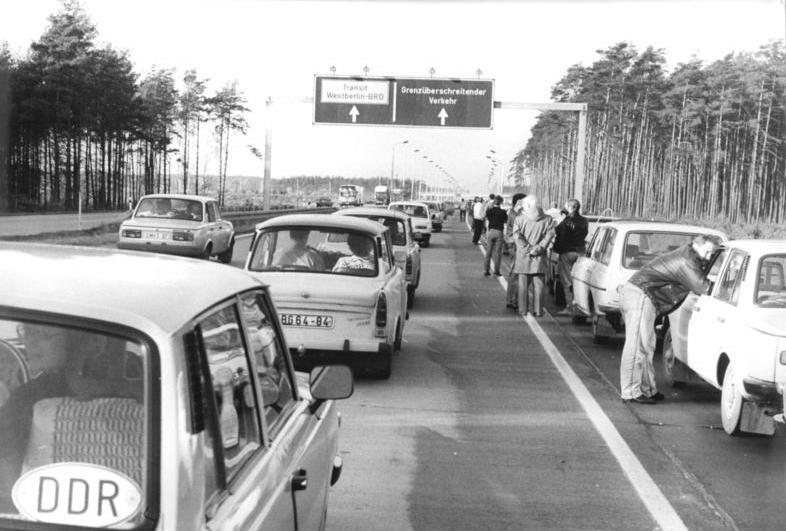
Queues of East German cars at the Zarrentin border crossing on 12 November 1989, three days after the Fall of the Berlin Wall.

Zarrentin am Schaalsee (German pronunciation: [ˈtsaʁɛntiːn ʔam ˈʃaːlˌzeː], lit. 'Zarrentin on the Schaalsee'), until 2004 simply Zarrentin, is a town in the Ludwigslust-Parchim district, in Mecklenburg-Western Pomerania, Germany. It is situated on the Schaalsee lake, 19 km southeast of Ratzeburg, and 34 km west of Schwerin.

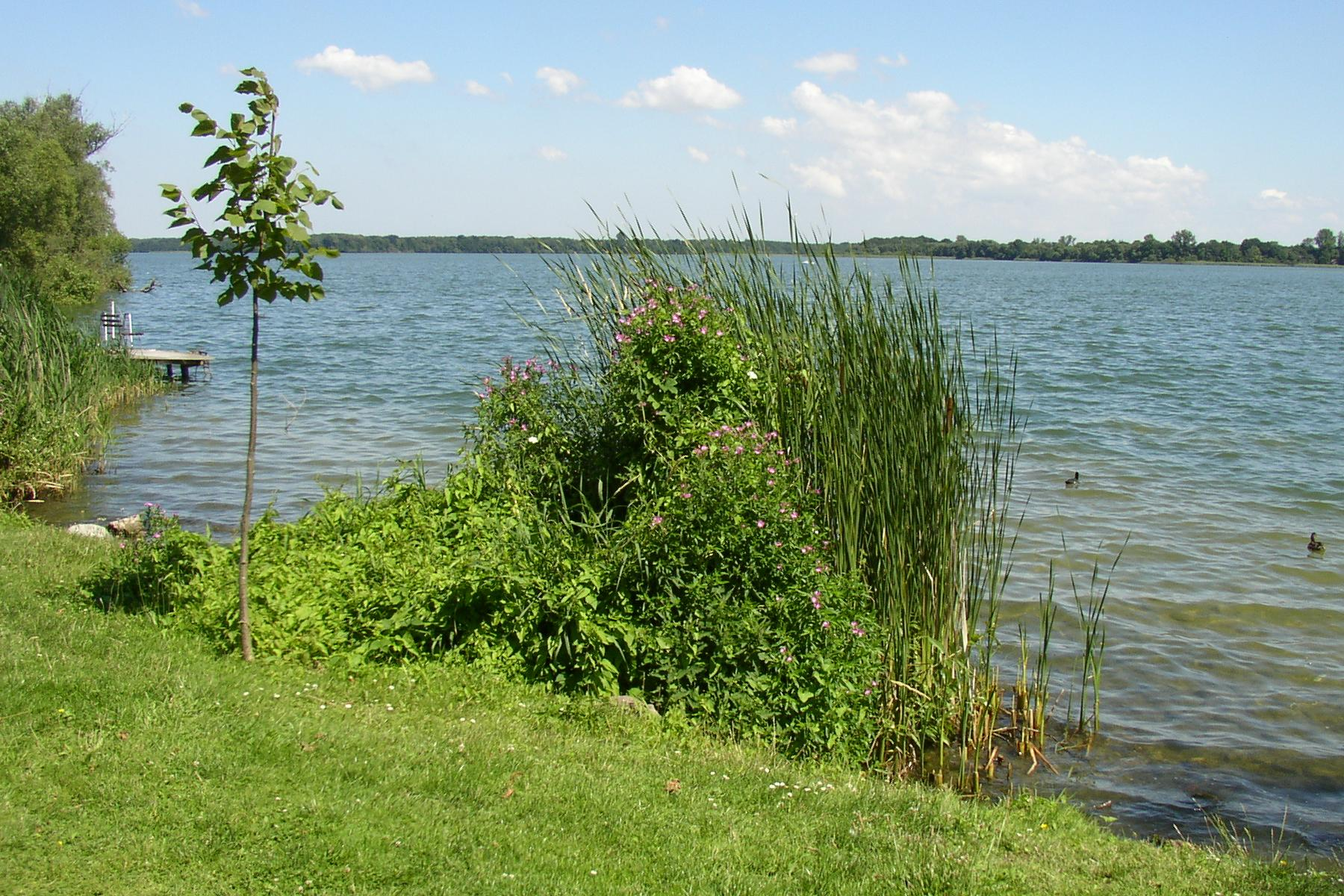
Schaalsee

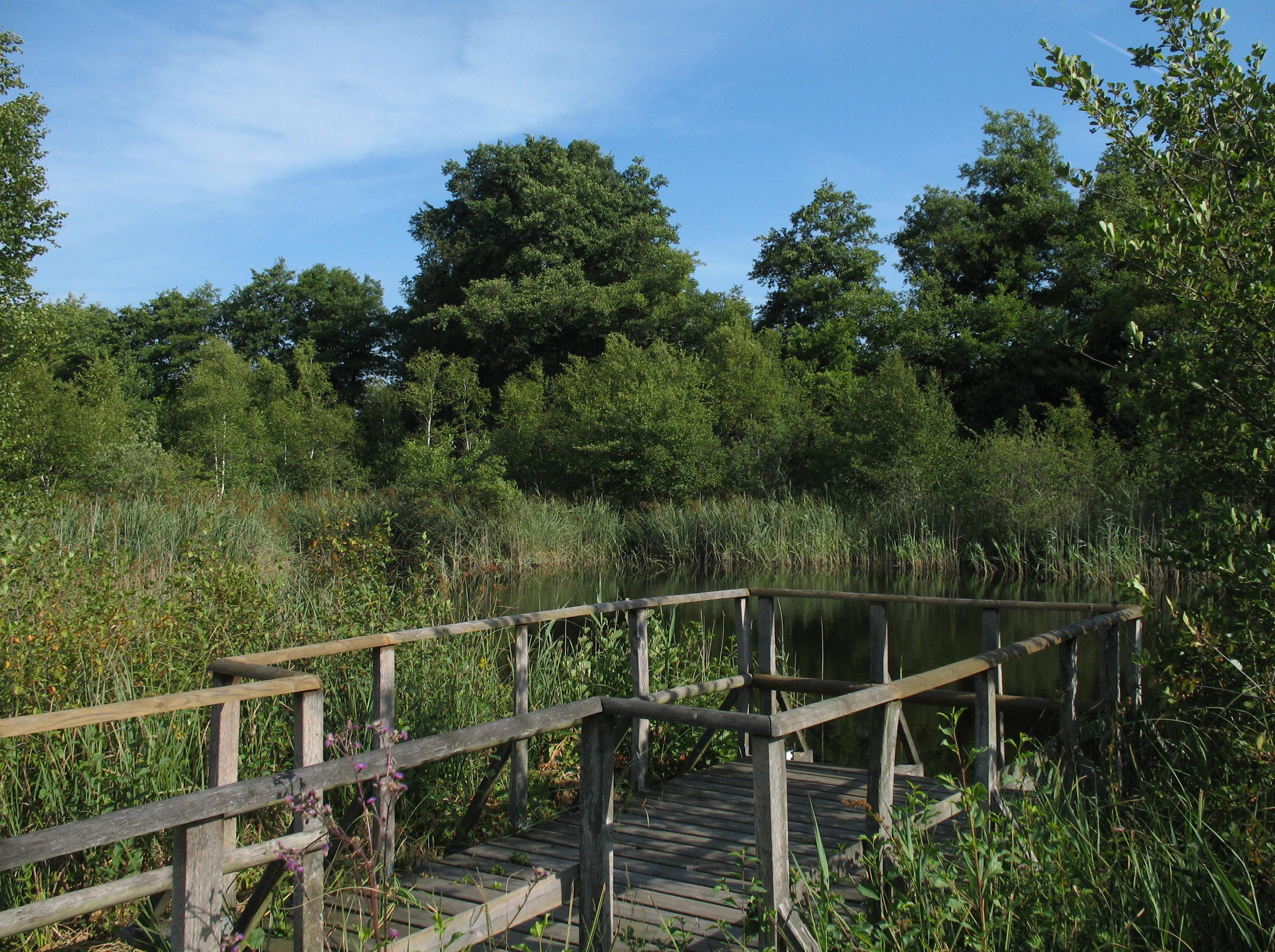
Hiking trail

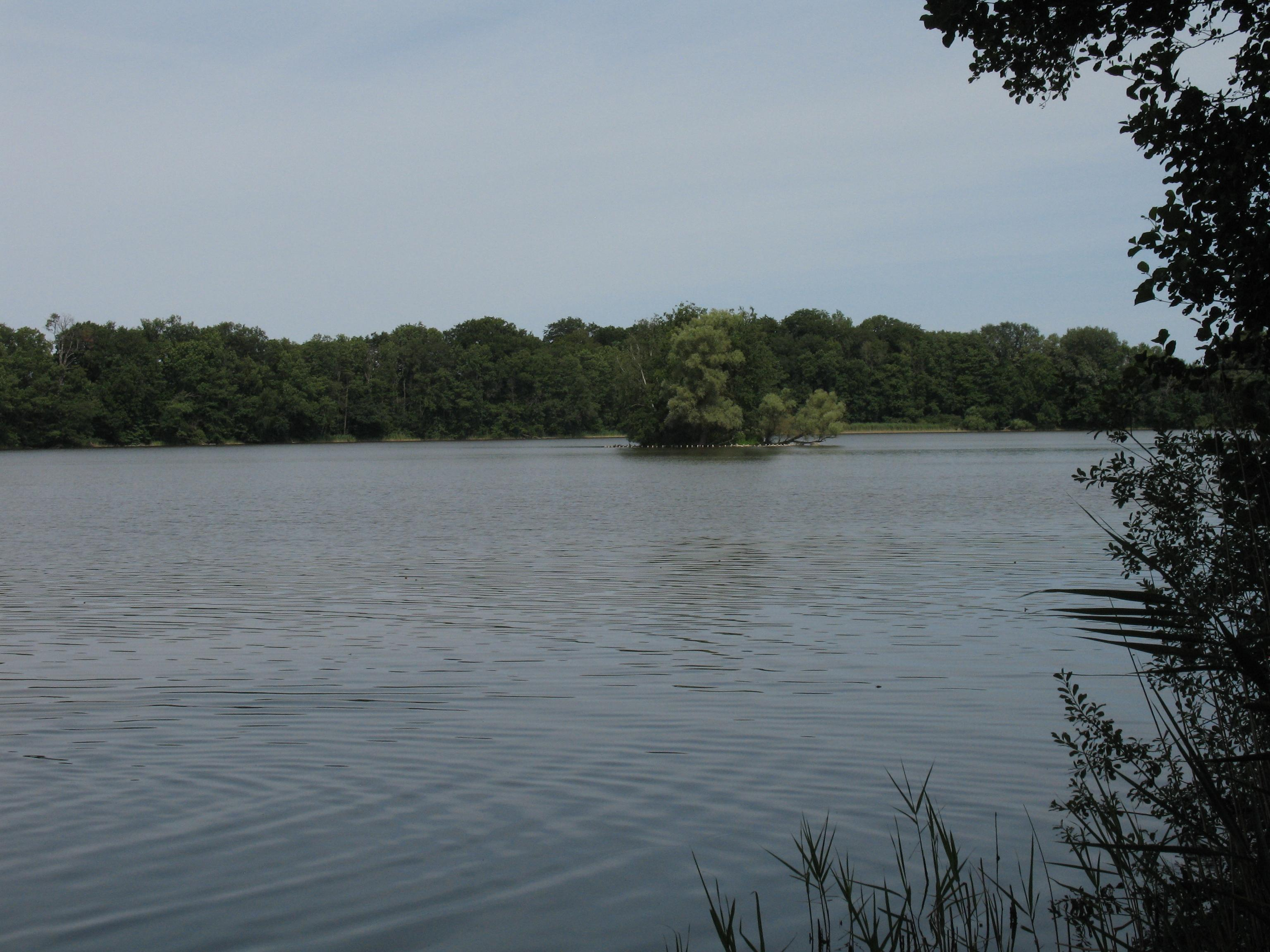
Lake Boissow

== History ==
In the 11th century, the Slavic settlement of Zarnethin was at Zarrentin. It could translate vaguely to "place of evil" or "black site", indicating a former ritual place. In 1139/1143 the place was reigned by Henry of Badewide, a Saxon count. From the late 12th century on, many Germans settled here. The Ratzeburger Zehntregister mentions the place in 1230.

The Zarrentin Abbey was founded in 1246 and dissolved in 1552. Parts of the building remain until today. When the town was connected to train tracks in 1896 via the Hagenow Land–Bad Oldesloe railway, it grew larger and became home to various factories (for barrels, potato fabrication, a lime kiln), and construction entrepreneurs, corn and cattle dealers settled. 1938, when Zarrentin already grew to a population of 2000, it received town privileges. Since then, it also became popular with tourists for the surrounding nature and the renowned hospitality.

Between 1982 and 1990 Zarrentin served as East German inner German border crossing for cars travelling along today's Bundesautobahn 24 between the East German Democratic Republic, or West Berlin and the West German Federal Republic of Germany. The traffic was subject to the interzonal traffic regulations, that between West Germany and West Berlin followed the special regulations of the Transit Agreement (1972).
