= Rolling Stones Museum =

Rolling Stones Museum may refer to:

- The Rolling Stones Museum, a museum in Slovenia on the rock band The Rolling Stones
- Stones Fan Museum, a museum in Germany on the rock band The Rolling Stones
