= Wustrow =

Wustrow (from a Slavic word for island) may refer to the following places in Germany:

- Wustrow, Lower Saxony, a town in the district Lüchow-Dannenberg, Lower Saxony
- Wustrow, Mecklenburg-Strelitz, a municipality in the district Mecklenburg-Strelitz, Mecklenburg-Vorpommern
- Wustrow (Fischland), a municipality in the Vorpommern-Rügen district, Mecklenburg-Vorpommern
- Siegfried Wustrow (1936–2023), German cyclist

== See also ==
- Wustrower Dumme, a river of the German states Saxony-Anhalt and Lower Saxony
