= Rundling =

Type of village in northern Germany

A Rundling (German pronunciation: [ˈʁʊntlɪŋ]) is a form of circular village, typical of settlements in the Germanic-Slav contact zone in the Early Medieval period.

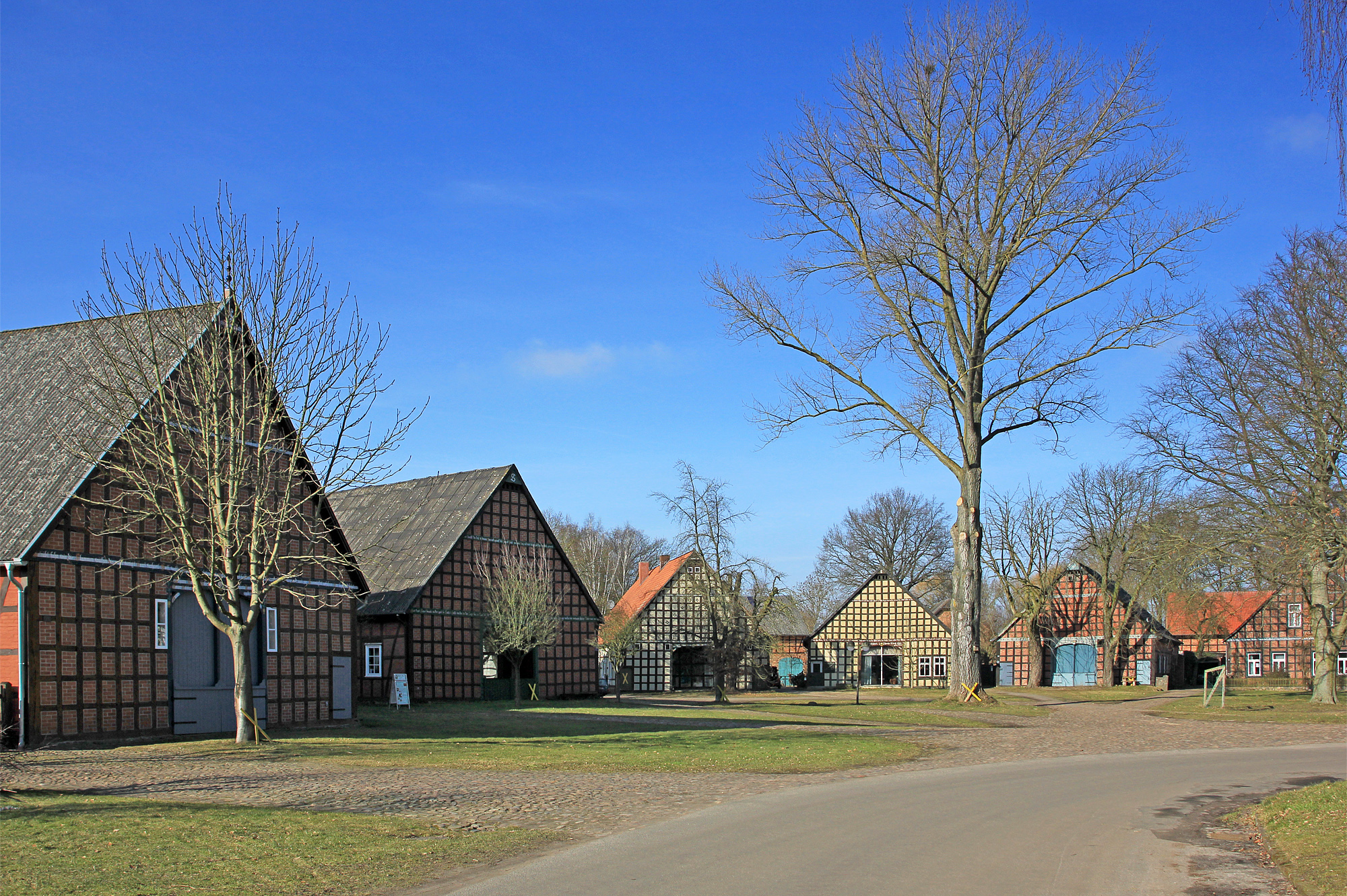
View of the Rundling Satemin, 3 km west of Lüchow in the Wendland

The Rundling was a relatively common village form created by German law, but housing Slav farmers. It usually comprises a central, circular village green owned in common with individually owned farmsteads radiating out around it like the spokes of a wheel. The best examples are now only in a small area of Lower Saxony in Germany near to the town of Lüchow. Nineteen of these villages were put forward as an ensemble for consideration as a possible World Heritage Site, but the decision in December 2023 [[Elbe-Jeetzel Zeitung 4.12.2023 See published article https://rundlingsverein.de/]] was negative and there are no plans for resubmitting.

At the City Hall in Oslo on 11 June 2015 the Rundlingsverein was awarded the Grand Prix for the European Union Prize for Cultural Heritage/Europa Nostra Award 2015. This was in recognition of 46 years of voluntary work in preserving these ancient settlements.

Such villages were originally found across a strip of central Germany from Kiel to Bohemia (where they are occasionally referred to as a Rundling, Runddorf, Rundlingsdorf, Rundplatzdorf or Platzdorf), often indicated by village names ending in -itz, -ow and -thin. Virtually all such Rundlinge are now only to be found in the small area of Wendland.

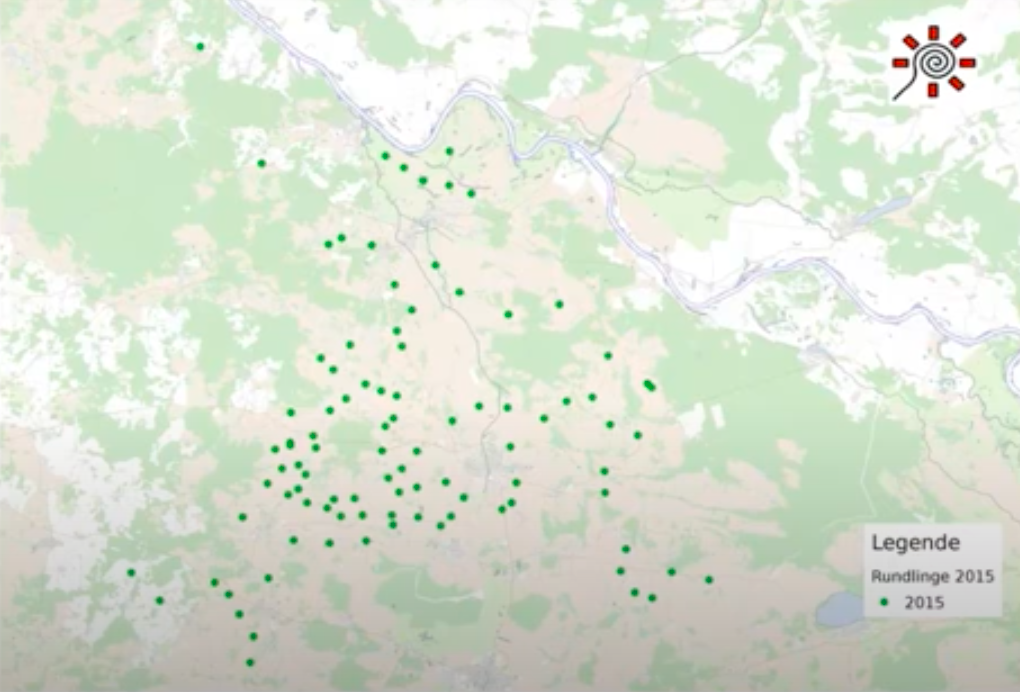
The locations of all remaining Rundlinge.

== History and origins ==
There are no contemporary historical records of the founding of these circular villages, but a consensus has arisen in recent decades that they were founded in the 12th century, on land that had not been previously cultivated, probably because of its essentially low lying boggy nature, its tendency to be flooded and the relative poverty of its sandy soil. The current leading theory is that of Professor Dr Wolfgang Meibeyer, who believes that all the Rundlinge were developed at more or less the same time in the 12th century, to a model developed by the then Germanic nobility as suitable for small groups of mainly Slavic farm-settlers. Whether these settlers were there by choice, by conquest or by forced settlement is no longer known. It does seem to have happened without much bloodshed, and the following centuries showed a living together of Germans and Slavs. This eventually led to an assimilation and eventual disappearance of the Slavs as a separate ethnic group with their own language, Wendish (Wendisch) or Polabian (dravänopolabisch), which is the language used for the majority of the Rundling names, and still to this day for certain unusual features of local rural architecture and land-use.

In other parts of Europe, outside of Wendland, different terms might be in use. In Slavic languages the term was "opole". Opole etymology is "around" (o) + "the field" (pole). The village green in the middle was (and sometimes still is) called the "maydan". There does not appear to be a connection between opole and rundlinge, although the Germanised population still often bears surnames such as Kophal (Polish: Kowal, "smith"), Ribeck (Polish: Rybak, "fisherman") and similar. They can also be found elsewhere, such as Byšičky in the Czech Republic. In present and formerly Slavic speaking countries in Central/East Europe many references to the opole can still be found, like the cities of Opole (formerly Oppeln) in Poland, Opolye in Russia, Opole Ter in Hungary or Apoldu du Jus in Romania, which is indicative of the Slavic origin of the concept, as German colonisation never reached the most eastern parts of the Slavic lands where the "opole"-toponymns still exist.

This separate Slavic language remained more generally in use in the region of Lüchow until the 18th century, and there is a written chronicle and dictionary still in existence drawn up by Johann Parum Schultze of the village of Süthen, in around 1725, which marks the increasing loss of the old language. The area of its historical use is now often called Wendland after those Slavic peoples who were called the Wends, and it corresponds more or less with the current administrative boundaries of the district of Lüchow-Dannenberg. Two related Slavic ethnic groups were the Wenden of the Spreewald and the Lusatian Sorbs of Upper Lusatia (Oberlausitz), together making a group of about 60,000 who still are said to be able to speak Sorbian in the Spreewald, an area of Eastern Germany near the Polish border around the towns of Bautzen and Cottbus.

== Appearance ==
Schematic diagram of a Rundling with its access track

There are very many circular shaped villages all across the world, but only those created by the Ostsiedlung in the 12th and 13th century should use the name Rundling. Although superficially similar to the Opole in Poland, or the villages around a village green in the UK, they do not have the same genesis and history as the Rundlinge of central Germany. The key is the division of village land into triangular "slices of cake" shapes, between wet pasture land and drier arable land, and the creation of exactly calculated strip farming on the arable land, to ensure absolute fairness of division between farmers, equal under the law. The illustration from the Heidelberger Sachsenspiegel (Cod. Pal.germ.164) of 1300, shows the relationship between the nobility (in green), the local landlords (with a straw hat) and the farmers, who clear the undergrowth of bush, and build the villages on greenfield sites. Later the local landlords act as administrators carrying out the wishes of the nobility, and creating churches and infrastructure. It was exactly so that the rundling villages were created.

These villages were usually small, with only a few farmsteads, averaging perhaps around 5–7, and built away from tracks or roads, around an open central village green, which was a part of the commons, not allocated to any one particular farmer. The leading farmer, called a Schulze, had a slightly better plot, set in the centre opposite the entrance to the village, and usually extra land outside the circle called by its Wendish name Güsteneitz. They are almost always to be found on the border between low-lying wetter land near to water and higher drier land more suitable for cultivation, called here geest.It is striking that most Rundlinge are situated on the 20 meter above sea-level line. Slavic settlers seem to have chosen this level so that they had access to both arable (in front of the village) and pasture land (behind the village). Access was from the higher Geest land, where there were through paths, and the villages originally were cul-de-sacs.The villages were fairly densely scattered across the area to be colonized, with each one barely a kilometre from its neighbour. This means that there were very many, fairly small, settlements. In very very few cases have they been amalgamated into larger villages or subsumed as suburbs of towns. Even today this pattern has continued. Of the 324 named settlements in today's Lüchow-Dannenberg, over 200 are or were once Rundlinge, and virtually none have been swallowed up by the encroachment of towns, or have been amalgamated into larger villages, although since the reforms of 1972, most have lost their political separateness. Prior to 1972 each village had its own separate political status, which led to there being 230 entities, Gemeinden, in what was then and still is one of the most sparsely settled areas of modern Germany, East or West. The smallest of the 230 was Liepehöfen, which had the princely number of 3 adult voters. Instead of 230 there are now 27 Gemeinden.

== Subsequent circular shape ==
The original shape of the Rundlinge was semi-circular or horse-shoe shaped. Most became circular through a period of time in the later Middle Ages, probably between 1500 and 1550, when population densities increased. This led to the original farmsteads being split into two, three or four, and additional wedge-shaped land being made available at the open entrance to the village, in effect closing the village in and allowing only one track in from outside. This development appears to have been ordained from above, rather than being the result of more than one son taking over a farmstead. This gives us the tightly packed Rundling of today with up to 20 farmsteads. The greater prosperity, and therefore greater population density of the Rundlinge of those times may have been related to the increasing addition of flax-weaving to the incomes of the farmers. In any event most of the originally semi-circular villages became more nearly circular, although there were in fact many slightly differently shaped solutions. Some of the Rundlinge today are more oval in shape, others more irregularly shaped. The original "one entrance to the village green" model was in some cases altered to take account, say, of a path to the local church or one to the local mill, and in later years these paths may have been widened to take vehicles, and may today form a route through the village. Although very many Rundlinge of today have retained their separateness, many have expanded during the last century and have modern houses added, typically in one direction away from the original round. This occasionally leads to an elongated village with the old Rundling at the end.{}

== External location of churches ==
One anomaly, which marks out these villages from others in other parts of Europe, is that the Rundling villages virtually never have a church in them. There are churches, even quite ancient ones, but they and their burial grounds are almost always well outside the Rundling itself. This could have come about because the Rundlinge were usually built only just above the water-table, whereas the churches needed higher ground to give enough depth for their burials. It could also be as a result of each village being too small to maintain a church, so the church had to serve several villages. However most researchers believe that it shows that Christianisation came late to the villages, after their basic structure had been created. There are reports by the church authorities of heathen practices well into modern times. It also suggests that, even where it had been possible to add a church to the village circle (even in the middle – why not?), they did not do so. There must have been a sense that it was not appropriate to do so, or there would be examples among the 200+ villages in Wendland, and there are not, even in the villages set on higher ground. Not only are there no churches, there are no schools or communal buildings, no shops and virtually no trade outlets. The villages are made up entirely of farm dwellings.{Wolfgang Meibeyer: Rundlinge und andere Dörfer im Wendland, Weddel, 2005, ISBN 3-9810610-0-4}

== Rundling and Low German Hall House ==
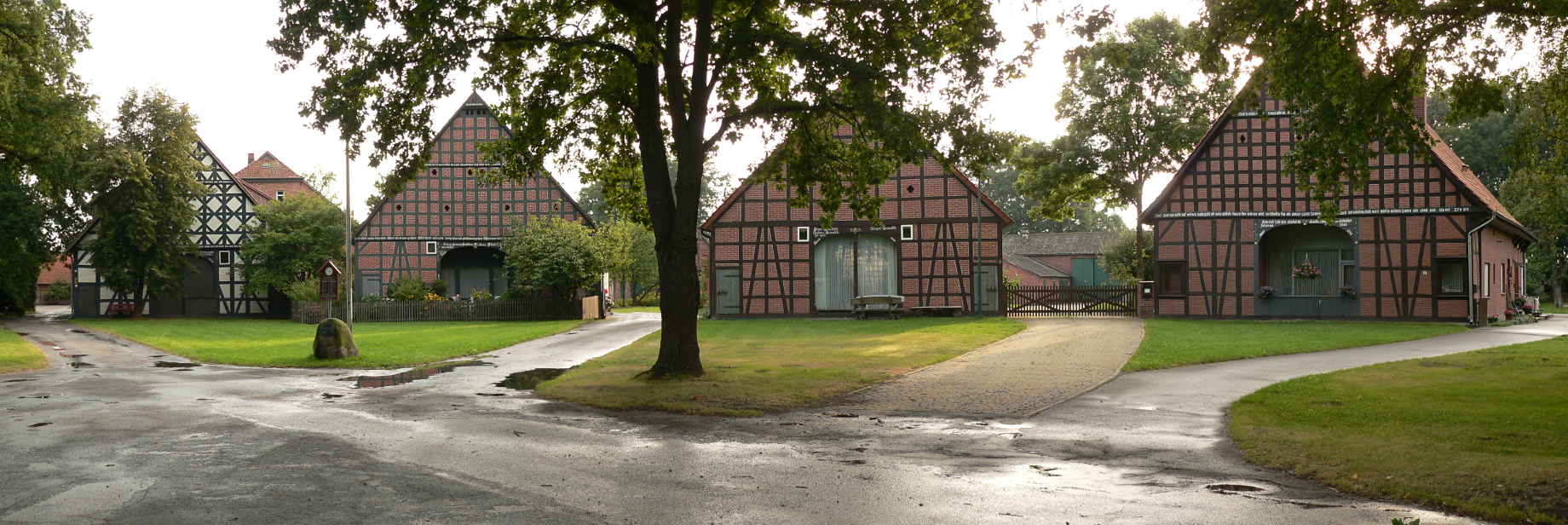
The Rundling village of Schreyahn with its Low German hall houses

Although the Rundling shape and the Rundling farmhouse architecture are two separate developments, with several hundred years between them, and which therefore need to be kept separate in our minds, it is the interplay between the two which makes the Wendland Rundlinge of today so attractive to the visitor. We have seen that the Rundling form seems to have been a planned form of division of property in newly colonized areas east of Germanic lands, and there are historically examples in a wide strip of land running from the Baltic Sea near Kiel and Lübeck down both sides of the Elbe river right down to the Czech Lands in the south. This corresponds to the Eastern Colonisation of Henry the Lion after 1147 and others in the so-called Wendenkreuzzug, or Wendish crusade, where the Pope had given his agreement to a northern crusade to conquer and convert the pagan Slavs, at the same time as others were taking part in southern crusades to retake Jerusalem from the Muslim Turks. However the architecture of the much later mediaeval farmhouses to the south of Wittenberg was different from those in the north, and so different parts of the north–south Rundling strip through Germany looked different as a result. The farmhouses of Wendland were a part of an enormous east–west area running from parts of Eastern Netherlands across the North German plain to Poland, where one form of farmhouse predominated. This was the area of the Low German Hall House (Niederdeutsches Hallenhaus), an all-in-one building of considerable size which housed not only the farmer and his family, but also most of his farmyard animals, his hay loft and his implements. Typically the hall house had the animals and the barn buildings at the front facing the village green, whereas the farmer lived at the back facing his garden or smallholding. The design of the house put the main open fire in the middle at the back of the barn area, the smoke disappearing through small apertures in the front facade. The hall house was an invention of the North German plains, and did not exist to the south of a line from Dortmund to Brunswick to Wittenberg to Stettin. This meant that only about one tenth of its entire width crossed the strip of land running north to south that was part of the 12th century Wendenkreuzzug, which created the Rundling form. Within this strip were the cities of Kiel, Lübeck and Hamburg and the four rural areas of Uelzen, Wendland, Prignitz and the Altmark around Salzwedel.

== Types of Low German hall house ==
The three types of hall house are called after the number of rows of pillars which carry the roof construction. The oldest form, which would also have the lowest roof, was called a Zweiständerhaus because the whole construction rested on two rows of pillars (front to back) carrying beams across the centre. They were pillars and not posts because they rested on stones and were not set in holes in the ground as their predecessors had been. A typical house might have 14 rows of pillars, with a corresponding 14 beams, each of them being originally a single oak tree. Nothing else is load-bearing, although the half-timbered construction with infill does give some extra stability. The infill these days is likely to be brickwork, but was originally wattle and daub, covered with a lime mixture. The oldest house in Wendland of this construction is around 1611, but only about 10 are 17th century in origin, most of the others being 18th century. They are comparatively rare, as less than 80 remain in Wendland. The more recent form which became common throughout the 19th century is called in German Vierständerhaus which means that the roof construction is carried by four rows of pillars carrying beams. This means that the central barn area is narrower than for Zweiständerhäuser but the two single storey sides are larger. The overall building will also be larger, and are sometimes three stories high, or have two stories with much larger hay lofts and storage above the barn. There is a third form which is called a Dreiständerhaus, with three rows of pillars. This looks like a two pillar-row house on one side, with lower eaves, and a four pillar-row house with higher eaves on the other. It also looks lopsided because the barn door is no longer central under the roof apex. This hybrid form can be found across all the eras but was commoner during the 18th century. It is commoner in Wendland than almost anywhere else across Northern Germany (although even here there are only 40 surviving examples), and there are two Wendland villages, Prießeck and Püggen, where it is the commonest form. It does not appear to be a transition between the two and the four pillar-row models but a genuine attempt to get the best of two different models, an experiment which ultimately did not make it through to the very end of the 19th century when almost the last hall houses were being built.{Dr Dirk Wübbenhorst: Page 221 "Hauslandschaften in Lüchow-Dannenberg" Hannoversches Wendland Band 20, HALD Wolfgang Jurries, Luchow 2023 ISSN 0931-6051}

== Present extent ==
Why only Wendland should retain the Rundling form, plus the Low German Hall House, is not immediately clear, but will have more to do with the relative wealth of the cities to the north, which would have swallowed up the "primitive" Rundlinge and its "primitive" rural architecture over the centuries. It is less easy to see why Uelzen, Prignitz and Salzwedel should have so few existing Rundlinge, as they did have them as recently as the 1820–1850 series of enclosure maps, Verkoppelungskarten. Prignitz, Salzwedel and the Altmark were politically parts of Prussia, and Wendland and Uelzen parts of the Kingdom of Hannover at this time. We know that the Government of Prussia had become alarmed at the numbers of fires caused by putting an open fire in the same building as the hay loft and a thatched roof, as well as the animals. They had therefore issued a decree in the early 18th century forbidding the building of traditional hall houses, and requiring farmers to separate out the functions of cooking and storage. This seems to have led to different solutions in Prussia from those traditional to the wider area, favouring Querdielenhäuser or transverse farmhouses, with the barn entrance to the side. In the Altmark they also had the tradition of putting gatehouses across the fronts of their farmsteads, thus blocking the view of the large barn doors from the centre of the village green. It is however probably as much poverty as decrees that led farmers to "make do and mend" rather than demolish their old houses and build new ones in their stead. And Wendland has always been at the poor end of the scale. This has continued right up to the present day, with its unfortunate position as part of the old West Germany sticking out into the old East Germany, so that it was bound on three sides by an electric fence which was the barrier to the Communist East for most of the second half of the 20th century. Wendland has always somehow been passed by, right from the times of the early Christianisation, and even today it has no motorways, virtually no railways, very little industry, very little employment and a shrinking population. If it is known for anything today, it is known for its decades-long fight against the deposit of radioactive waste in Gorleben, a site chosen by the politicians of a generation ago precisely because so few people live there.

== 20th century ==
From the 1880s onwards began a time of greater prosperity in Germany, and this was reflected in Wendland too with the arrival of some industry. A few large brick buildings typical of the time called the Gründerzeit were built in the modern style, and were often faced sideways to the village green, but these were the exceptions. Most farmers had only enough spare to renovate their houses, occasionally replacing the half-timbering with brick, or tiling the outside to give better warmth inside. Most Rundlinge survived intact. Up to the Second World War, the small scale farming of areas such as the Wendland was still just sustainable, although the domestic flax industry had by then disappeared. Briefly in the late 1940s and early 1950s, Wendland became home to very many refugees from the east, but the increasing pull of the industrialised parts of the new Federal Germany led to many moving on. The subsequent division of Germany into East and West affected Wendland a great deal, as it became isolated to the north, east and south by the Inner German Border for almost 40 years until 1989. This development, whilst largely negative for the region, had two major positives. Firstly the rural isolation of the Rundling villages was not affected negatively by industry or motorways, and secondly Wendland became a second home for a large number of West Berliners, who were anxious about their position, surrounded as they were on all sides by an unfriendly state. It was largely Berliners who invested in the old property of the Wendland, which was cheap and spacious. They rescued whole villages from certain ruin. At the same time the local population, reflecting post-war prosperity, was embracing modernization, and pulling down old hall houses to replace them with far less sympathetic modern housing, which was cheaper to maintain and warmer in winter! This trend was noticed with alarm by many lovers of the old hall houses in their picturesque circular villages, and the Rundlingsverein was brought into existence in 1969 to educate the population to the potential loss of a heritage that had become unique not only in Germany but in the whole of Europe. It was those early pioneers that eventually stopped the old houses being demolished, thought through alternative uses for the buildings and supported the initiatives of the Denkmalpflege (the government agency for the protection of monuments in Germany) to preserve the cultural heritage of the Rundlinge and their hall houses.{ 50 Jahre Rundlingsverein im Wendland, published by the Rundlingsverein eV, September 2019}

== Rundlinge today ==
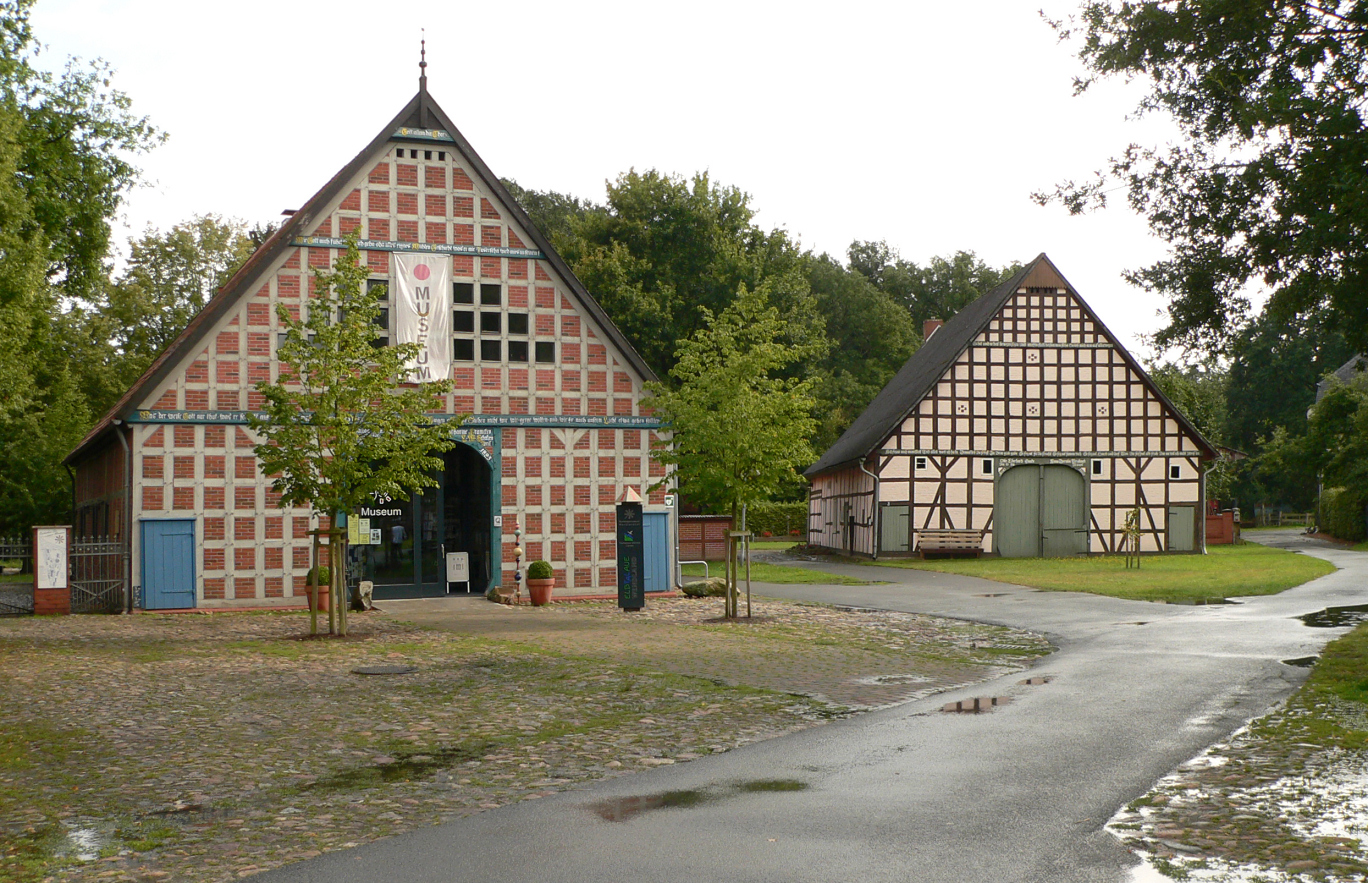
The Rundling museum of Wendlandhof in Lübeln

How many Rundlinge there are is a more difficult question to answer than one might think. Originally there were perhaps a thousand such villages created in the 12th and 13th centuries, perhaps 400 of which survived into the 19th century. In Hanoverian Wendland alone there are over 200 which were clearly still Rundlinge at the time of the Verkopplungskarten (a type of enclosure map, marking the ownership of land and property) in the early parts of the 19th century. Many had already succumbed to catastrophic fires, and had been fully or partially rebuilt, not always as Rundlinge. Modernization has led to the destruction of many of the older hall houses, and their replacement by modern housing, sometimes but not always affecting the circular structure of the villages.

The Rundlingsverein analysed 210 villages in 2012–2014, and categorised 93 villages in Wendland as still recognizable as Rundlinge to an untrained eye, and of these about 30 are of sufficient interest to tourists to warrant developing a tourist plan. The Rundlingsverein, which has long supported the preservation of these unique villages for posterity, put its weight behind the unsuccessful bid from the Samtgemeinde for UNESCO recognition.

English: Considered the last 93 Rundlinge in Wendland

The 93 villages are as follows: Banzau, Bausen*, Beesem, Belau, Belitz, Beseland, Beutow, Bischof, Breese im Bruche, Breustian, Bückau, Bussau*, Dambeck, Diahren*, Dolgow*, Dünsche, Gistenbeck, Gollau, Göttien, Grabau, Granstedt*, Groß Gaddau, Groß Sachau, Großwitzeetze, Gühlitz*, Guhreitzen, Gümse, Güstritz*, Jabel*, Jameln, Jeetzel, Jiggel, Karmitz, Karwitz, Klautze, Klein Breese, Klein Heide, Klein Witzeetze, Klennow*, Köhlen*, Kremlin*, Kriwitz, Krummasel, Kukate, Künsche, Küsten, Lensian*, Loge, Lübeln*, Luckau, Lütenthien, Mammoißel*, Marleben, Marlin, Metzingen, Meuchefitz, Mützen, Nienbergen, Nienwedel, Pannecke, Penkefitz, Platenlaase, Predöhlsau, Prezier, Prießeck*, Püggen*, Puttball, Ranzau, Reddebeitz, Reetze, Rehbeck, Saaße, Saggrian, Salderatzen, Satemin*, Schlanze, Schmarsau (Dannenberg), Schmarsau (Lemgow), Schreyahn*, Seerau in der Lucie, Solkau, Spithal, Tarmitz, Thunpadel, Thurau, Tobringen, Tolstefanz, Trabuhn, Tramm, Vasenthien, Wöhningen, Zadrau, Zeetze. The 18 starred villages plus Ganse* formed part of Lower Saxony's bid for World Heritage status.

== Literature ==
- Wolfgang Meibeyer: Rundlinge und andere Dörfer im Wendland, Weddel, 2005, ISBN 3-9810610-0-4
- Wolfgang Meibeyer: Rundlinge, Wendland-Lexikon, Band 2, Lüchow 2008, ISBN 978-3-926322-45-6, pages 306–312.
- Rundlinge und Slawen, Beiträge zur Rundlingsforschung, Hrsg.: Wolfgang Jürries, Lüchow, 2004, ISBN 3-9806364-0-2
- Rundlinge im Hannoverschen Wendland by the Society for the Preservation of Rundlings in the Hanoverian Wendland (Verein zur Erhaltung von Rundlingen im Hannoverschen Wendland)
- Hannoversches WendlandBand 19, HALD Wolfgang Jurries, Luchow 2019 ISSN 0931-6051
- Hannoversches Wendland Band 20, HALD Wolfgang Jurries, Luchow 2023 ISSN 0931-6051
