= Luckau (Wendland) =

- Municipality
- Location of Luckau within Lüchow-Dannenberg district
- Interactive map of Luckau
- Location within Germany Location within Lower Saxony
- Coordinates: 52°56′N 11°03′E
- Country: Germany
- State: Lower Saxony
- District: Lüchow-Dannenberg
- Subdivisions: 10 Ortsteile

Area
  - Total: 22.37 km^{2} (8.64 sq mi)
- Elevation: 22 m (72 ft)

Population (2025-12-31)
  - Total: 576
  - Density: 25.7/km^{2} (66.7/sq mi)
- Time zone: UTC+01:00 (CET)
  - Summer (DST): UTC+02:00 (CEST)
- Postal codes: 29487
- Dialling codes: 05843
- Vehicle registration: DAN

Luckau (German pronunciation: [ˈlʊkaʊ]) is a village or Gemeinde (municipality) in the south of the Kreis (local government district) of Lüchow-Dannenberg in Lower Saxony, Germany, where it forms part of the Samtgemeinde (joint municipal association) of Lüchow.

The village lies some eight kilometres southwest of Lüchow itself, the administrative centre of both the Kreis and the Samtgemeinde. The southern border of the municipality coincides with that between the German federal states of Lower Saxony and Saxony-Anhalt.

Situated in the region known as the Wendland, Luckau is one of the rundlings (villages arranged in a circle around a common) that are characteristic of the area. The name Luckau comes from the Slavic lauck, signifying a leek- or onion-field.

== Parishes included in the municipality ==
- Bülitz
- Köhlen
- Mammoißel
  This hamlet is one of the best-preserved Wendland rundlings. Worth seeing is a four-post Low German "hall house" dating from 1777, which displays a diagonal pattern of tiling and half-timbers. The placename stems from the Slavic and means Seat of the Malomysl. Around 40 people live here.
- Nauden
- Püggen
- Steine
- Zargleben
- Zeetze
