= Dumme =

Dumme refers to two streams in Germany:

- Salzwedeler Dumme, a western tributary of the Jeetzel/Jeetze in Saxony-Anhalt
- Wustrower Dumme, a western tributary of the Jeetzel/Jeetze in Saxony-Anhalt and Lower Saxony
