= Bergen an der Dumme =

- Municipality
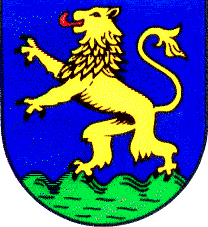
- Coat of arms

- Location of Bergen an der Dumme within Lüchow-Dannenberg district
- Interactive map of Bergen an der Dumme
- Location within Germany Location within Lower Saxony
- Coordinates: 52°53′N 10°58′E
- Country: Germany
- State: Lower Saxony
- District: Lüchow-Dannenberg
- Municipal assoc.: Lüchow (Wendland)
- Subdivisions: 8 Ortsteile

Government
  - Mayor: Wolf Rüdiger Preuß (CDU)

Area
  - Total: 25.48 km^{2} (9.84 sq mi)
- Elevation: 22 m (72 ft)

Population (2025-12-31)
  - Total: 1,398
  - Density: 54.87/km^{2} (142.1/sq mi)
- Time zone: UTC+01:00 (CET)
  - Summer (DST): UTC+02:00 (CEST)
- Postal codes: 29468
- Dialling codes: 05845
- Vehicle registration: DAN
- Website: www.bergen-dumme.de

Bergen an der Dumme is a municipality in the district of Lüchow-Dannenberg, in Lower Saxony, Germany. The Polabian name of Bergen is Ďörskă (spelled Tÿörska in older German reference material), probably derived from ďöră (< Slavic *goră) ‘mountain’.

Bergen an der Dumme lies in the southwestern part of the Wendland region. It is located south of the Drawehn on the southeastern edge of the Elbufer-Drawehn Nature Park. The Wustrow Dumme, western tributary of the River Jeetzel, flows through it.
