= Wendland =

Region in Germany

Coordinates: 52.9665°N 11.1503°E

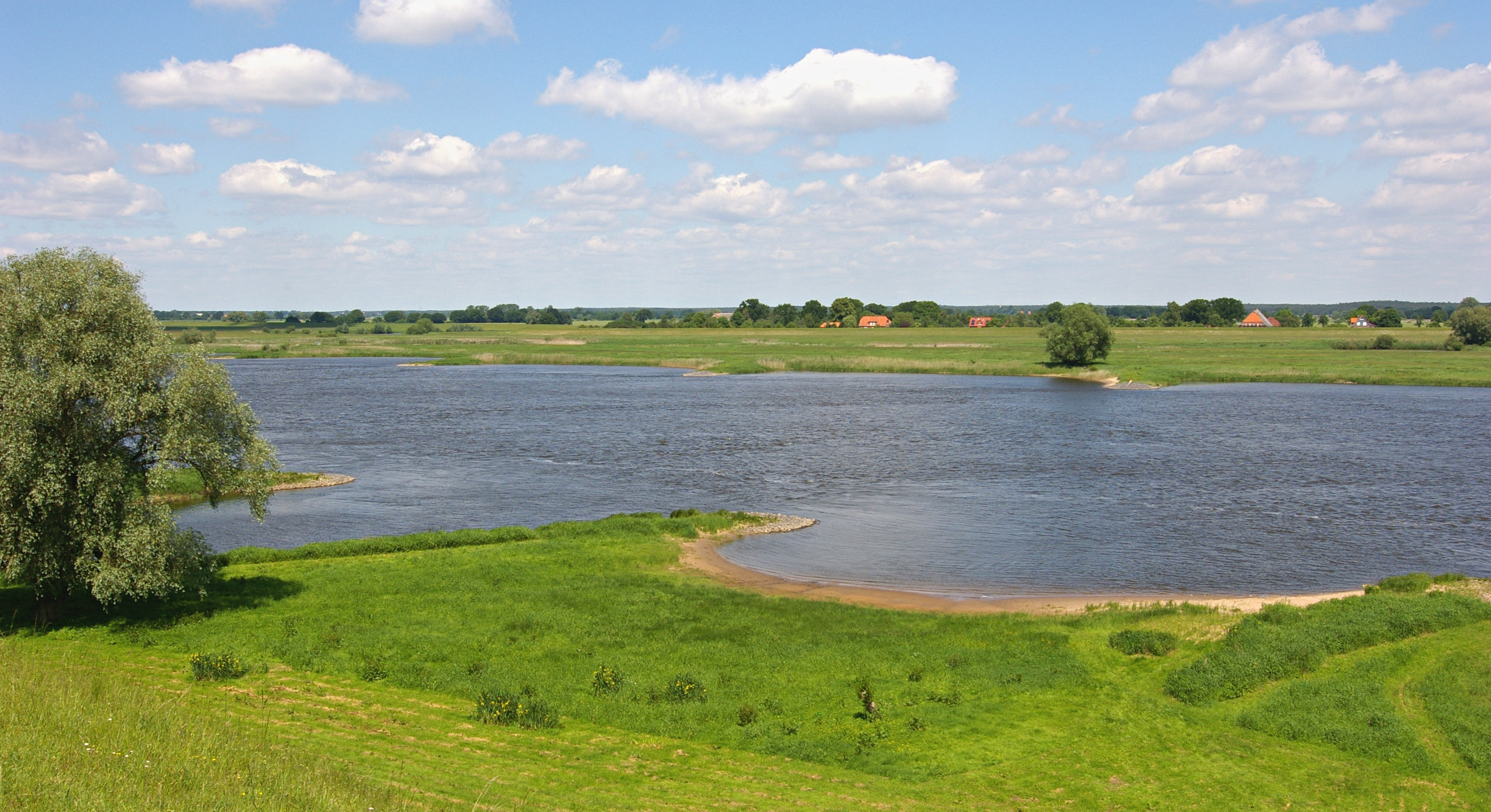
In the north the Wendland is bounded by the flood plain of the Elbe

The Wendland (German pronunciation: [ˈvɛntlant]) is a region in Germany on the borders of the present states of Brandenburg, Mecklenburg-Western Pomerania, Lower Saxony and Saxony-Anhalt. Its heart is the Hanoverian Wendland in the county of Lüchow-Dannenberg in Lower Saxony.

In 2012 the state of Lower Saxony nominated the Rundling villages in Hanoverian Wendland for the German shortlist of candidates for future UNESCO World Heritage Sites. Subsequent decisions that will determine the success of this bid take place in 2013 at the conference of education ministers (Kultusministerkonferenz) and no earlier than 2017 by UNESCO.

== Etymology ==
Wendland is not an ancient regional name. The term was first used around 1700, when a priest from Wustrow wrote about the language, habits, customs and manners of the Polabian inhabitants of this area. He viewed the people in the Dannenberg districts as Wends, an old German word for Slavs, and so named the region the Wendland. Over the course of time the name stuck. The term Vendland was used for the regions east of Lübeck, however, by the Scandinavian peoples since at least before the turn of the 10th Century. One recorded historic instance is when King Olaf I of Norway in 982 married Queen Geira, a daughter of King Burizleif of Vendland.

== Landscape ==
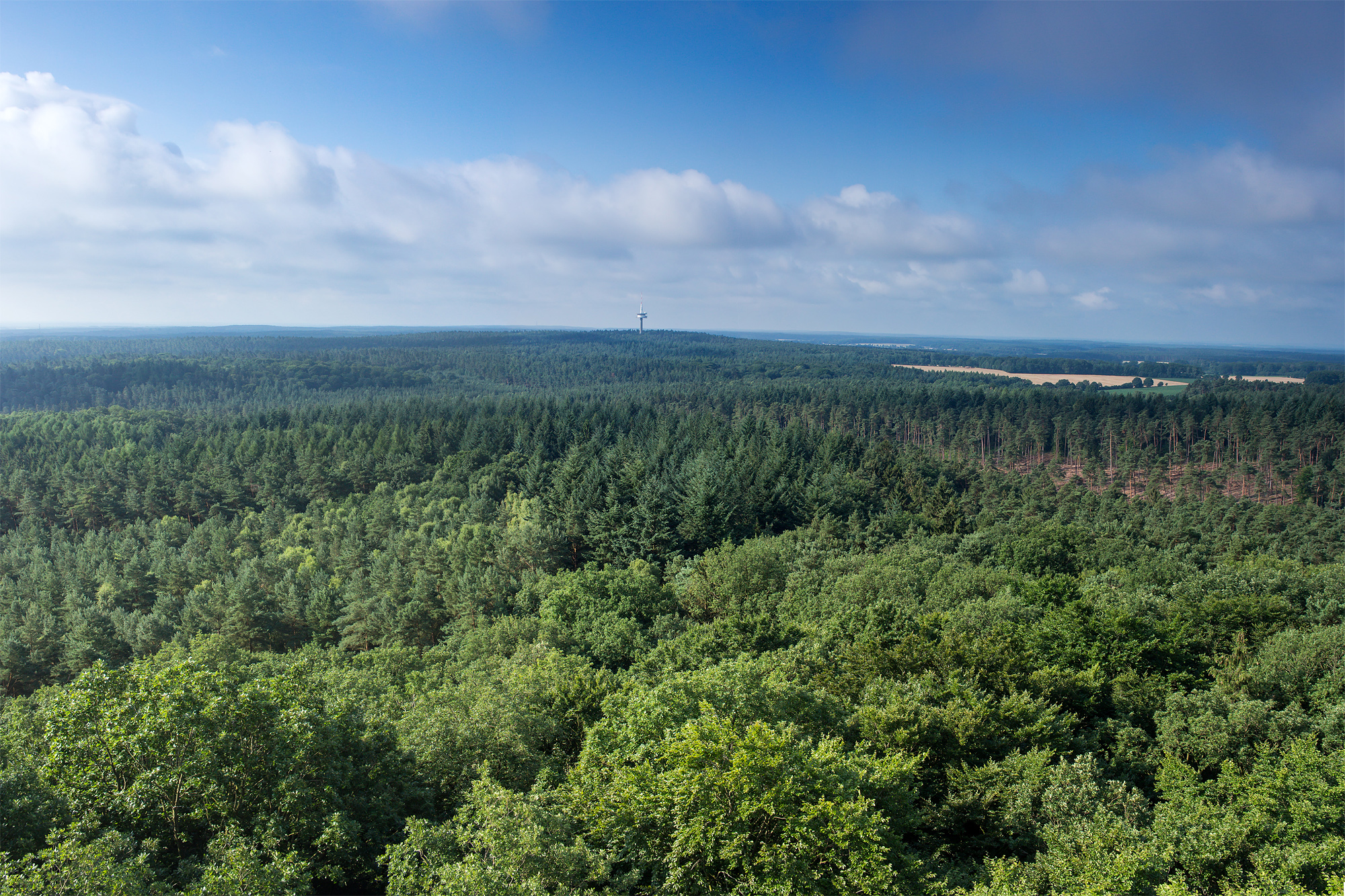
In the west the partially wooded Drawehn ridge dominates the Hanoverian Wendland; view from the Hoher Mechtin

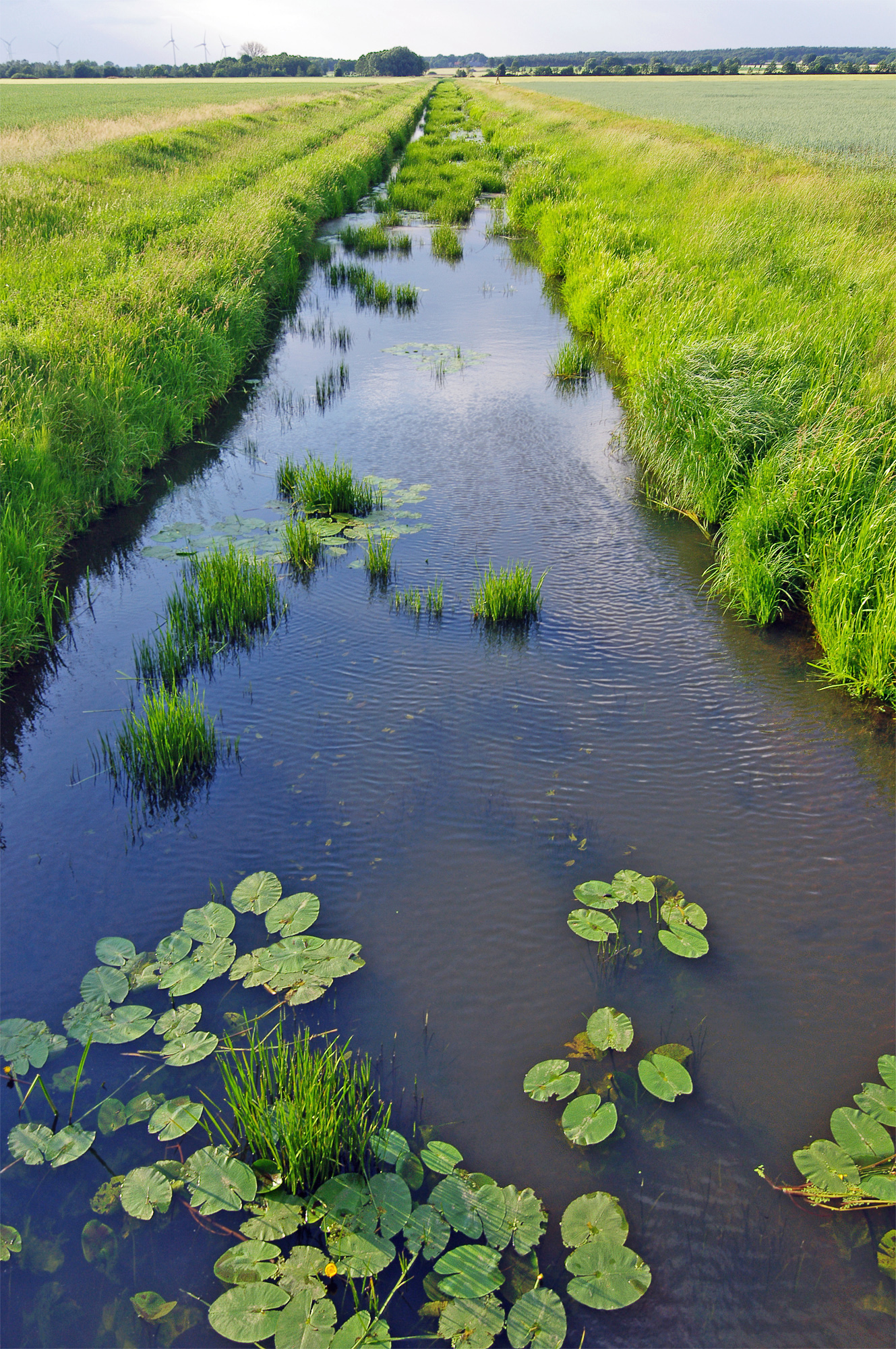
The Lüchower Landgraben and Grenzgraben depressions separate the Wendland in the south from the Altmark; view over the Flötgraben of Lemgow

Geographically the western Wendland is also the eastern edge of the Lüneburg Heath, its appearance shaped during the Saale glaciation. Here the countryside is dominated by the ridge of the Drawehn, which is a gravelly, east Hanoverian terminal moraine. It is thus a sandy geest terrain, afforested with pines. With infertile soils and a scarcity of water as a result of the porous soil it was always historically a hostile environment for settlers. The largest part of the Hanoverian Wendland, however, lies in the glacial meltwater valley (Urstromtal) of the River Elbe. A distinction here needs to be made between the actual flood plain of the Elbe in the north and the Lüchow Depression. The latter is a lower terrace, crossed by numerous streams - the largest being the Jeetzel – canals and ditches. Low hills are formed by small, island-like ground moraines like Öring, Lemgow, Langendorfer Geestinsel and Höhbeck. In the east the Gartow Forest stands on a large plain of wind-borne sand (see also: Wendland and Altmark).

== Culture and history ==
The Wendland was heavily influenced by the Polabian Slav culture. In the Middle Ages, and in places up to the Early Modern Period the Wendland was inhabited by Western Slavs, called Wends in German. As a result there are numerous place names that have Slavic origins, as well as circular villages of the Rundling type that emerged during times of German-Slav conflict in the Medieval period. The Slavic language of the Wendlanders, the Draveno-Polabian, died out by 1756. Previously, the Wendland was the westernmost point of the Slavic language region.

Until the Wende ("great change") in 1989/90, the Wendland was a border zone that extended like a salient into East Germany. Beginning in the late 1970s, it was known for protests against the atomic waste storage facility at Gorleben, and for the so-called Free Republic of Wendland of 1980 – a protest camp later cleared by police.

Since 1989, a cultural festival, the Kulturelle Landpartie, has taken place in the Wendland annually between Ascension Day and Pentecost.

== Types of settlement ==
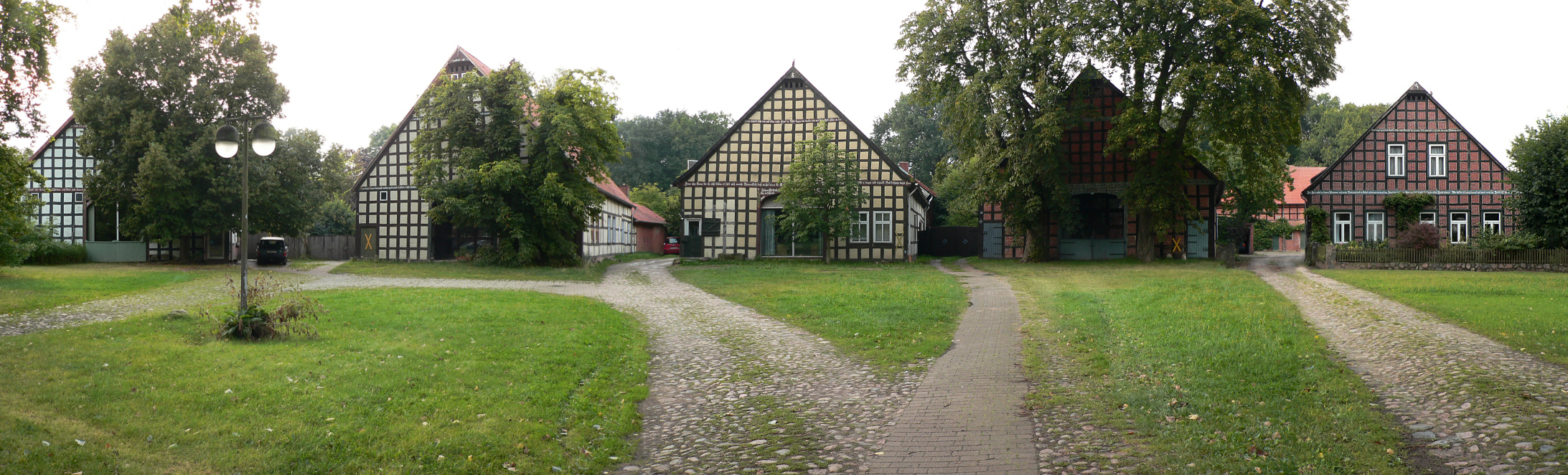
View of the rundling village of Satemin, 3 kilometres west of Lüchow

In Hanoverian Wendland, a distinctive type of historic circular village, known as the Rundling, is common even today. Almost all Rundlinge still bear village names of Slavic origin. This type of settlement occurred in regions from the Baltic Sea to the Ore Mountains, but has only survived in its original form in any numbers in the Wendland due to the relative isolation of the region since the Middle Ages and its distance from the main trading routes.

Over 100 villages in the area still preserve the characteristic appearance of a Rundling. But similar villages called by other names such as Runddorf or Platzdorf or Rundangerdorf occur in significant numbers in neighbouring Altmark as well as the eastern parts of the counties of Lüneburg, Uelzen, Gifhorn and in the south on the Vorsfelder Werder (Rühen, Wendschott, Brackstedt, Velstove) and some parts of Schleswig-Holstein. However, unlike those in the Hanoverian Wendland, they have been greatly modified. It has been put forward that the unusually good preservation state of the Rundlings in the Hanoverian Wendland is largely due to their relatively isolated situation and the low economic prosperity of the region. But socio-cultural reasons appear to have also played an important role.

=== Shortlisting for World Heritage status ===
The Rundling villages of the Hanoverian Wendland were nominated in 2012 by the state of Lower Saxony as a cultural landscape for the German shortlist of candidates for future UNESCO World Heritage Sites. On 18 June 2012, the Lower Saxon Ministry of Science and Culture (Niedersächsisches Ministerium für Wissenschaft und Kultur) announced its decision following a selection process that had started in 2011. The conference of cultural ministers (Kultusministerkonferenz) decided in 2014 that the villages would not be among the 10 objects selected from the 32 candidates. They were rolled forward into the next cycle of entries in the years 2017–2023, but the initiative failed again.

The original bid was based on 15 Rundling villages chosen to represent a selection of highly distinctive high medieval colonisation settlements in the county of Lüchow-Dannenberg. Since then the bid has been modified to encompass the landscape between the villages, and 19 villages were chosen to represent the best of the Rundlingslandschaft. The uniqueness of these circular villages stems from their combination of a distinctive ground plan, a high density of Low German hall houses with their gable ends facing a central green as well as the fact that their houses represent a regionally specific variation of this type of farmhouse. The state of Lower Saxony hoped that the bid will prove successful because these circular villages are among the most unrepresented categories of cultural landscapes and farming architecture in the UNESCO's world heritage list. However the decision was taken by the German state governments on December 4th 2023 not to put the "Rundling Landschaft" forward to UNESCO in Paris. There are no current plans to resubmit the bid.

== Literature ==
- Wendland-Lexikon. ed.: Wolfgang Jürries und Berndt Wachter, Köhring, Lüchow, 2008, Vol. 1: A-K, 2nd ed., 424 pp., Ill., Kt, ISBN 978-3-926322-28-9; Vol. 2: L-Z., 640 pp., Ill., graph. Darst., Kt., ISBN 978-3-926322-45-6
- Ingeborg Harms: Das Wendland. in: Deutsche Landschaften. S. Fischer, Frankfurt am Main, 2003. ISBN 3-10-070404-5
- A. Danneberg, T. Danneberg, B. Eisermann, A. Krüger, B. Sturm: 750 Jahre Trebel, 1251–2001. Köhring, Lüchow, 2001.
- Burghard Kulow: Damals im Wendland. edition limosa, Clenze, 2008. ISBN 978-3-86037-345-3
