= Luckau (disambiguation) =

Luckau is a city in the federal state of Brandenburg, Germany.

Luckau may also refer to:

- Luckau (Wendland), a village in Lower Saxony, Germany
- Luckau-Uckro railway station, a station in the locality of Uckro in the city of Luckau
- Battle of Luckau, a battle fought at Luckau in Brandenburg on 4 June 1813
