= Woltersdorf, Lower Saxony =

Woltersdorf
- Municipality
- Coat of arms

- Location of Woltersdorf within Lüchow-Dannenberg district
- Interactive map of Woltersdorf
- Location within Germany Location within Lower Saxony
- Coordinates: 52°57′N 11°13′E
- Country: Germany
- State: Lower Saxony
- District: Lüchow-Dannenberg
- Municipal assoc.: Lüchow (Wendland)
- Subdivisions: 4 Ortsteile

Government
  - Mayor: Claudia Hennings (CDU)

Area
  - Total: 28.05 km^{2} (10.83 sq mi)
- Elevation: 31 m (102 ft)

Population (2025-12-31)
  - Total: 879
  - Density: 31.3/km^{2} (81.2/sq mi)
- Time zone: UTC+01:00 (CET)
  - Summer (DST): UTC+02:00 (CEST)
- Postal codes: 29497
- Dialling codes: 05841
- Vehicle registration: DAN

Woltersdorf (German pronunciation: [ˈvɔltɐsdɔʁf]) is a municipality in the district Lüchow-Dannenberg, in Lower Saxony, Germany.

The municipality Woltersdorf includes the villages Woltersdorf, Klein Breese, Lichtenberg and Thurau.

Famous sites around Woltersdorf are the Brautstein ("stone of the bride") and the Feldkirche ("church on the field"). Both of these can be seen in the coat of arms of Woltersdorf.

The Brautstein is a formation of ancient boulders left behind by glaciers in the ice age. The Feldkirchr has a little stone in its walls which was taken from the Slavic population and was built into the church.
