= Clenze =

- Municipality
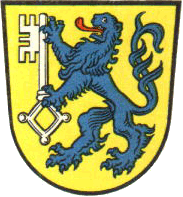
- Coat of arms

- Location of Clenze within Lüchow-Dannenberg district
- Interactive map of Clenze
- Location within Germany Location within Lower Saxony
- Coordinates: 52°56′09″N 10°57′21″E
- Country: Germany
- State: Lower Saxony
- District: Lüchow-Dannenberg
- Municipal assoc.: Lüchow (Wendland)
- Subdivisions: 26 Ortsteile

Government
  - Mayor: Uwe Schulz

Area
  - Total: 72.35 km^{2} (27.93 sq mi)
- Elevation: 25 m (82 ft)

Population (2025-12-31)
  - Total: 2,154
  - Density: 29.77/km^{2} (77.11/sq mi)
- Time zone: UTC+01:00 (CET)
  - Summer (DST): UTC+02:00 (CEST)
- Postal codes: 29459
- Dialling codes: 05844
- Vehicle registration: DAN

Clenze (German pronunciation: [ˈklɛntsə]) is a municipality in the district Lüchow-Dannenberg, in Lower Saxony, Germany. It is situated approximately 20 km northwest of Salzwedel, and 25 km east of Uelzen.

The Polabian name of Clenze is Klǫcka (spelled Cloontzka in older German reference material).

Up until November 1, 2006, Clenze was the seat of the Samtgemeinde ("collective municipality") Clenze. It is now part of the Samtgemeinde Lüchow (Wendland).
