= Waddeweitz =

- Municipality
- Location of Waddeweitz within Lüchow-Dannenberg district
- Interactive map of Waddeweitz
- Location within Germany Location within Lower Saxony
- Coordinates: 53°00′N 10°58′E
- Country: Germany
- State: Lower Saxony
- District: Lüchow-Dannenberg
- Municipal assoc.: Lüchow (Wendland)

Government
  - Mayor: Hermann Döscher (CDU)

Area
  - Total: 48.8 km^{2} (18.8 sq mi)
- Elevation: 40 m (130 ft)

Population (2025-12-31)
  - Total: 867
  - Density: 17.8/km^{2} (46.0/sq mi)
- Time zone: UTC+01:00 (CET)
  - Summer (DST): UTC+02:00 (CEST)
- Postal codes: 29496
- Dialling codes: 05849
- Vehicle registration: DAN
- Website: www.waddeweitz.de

Waddeweitz is a municipality in the district Lüchow-Dannenberg, in Lower Saxony, Germany.
