= Wustrower Dumme =

River in Germany

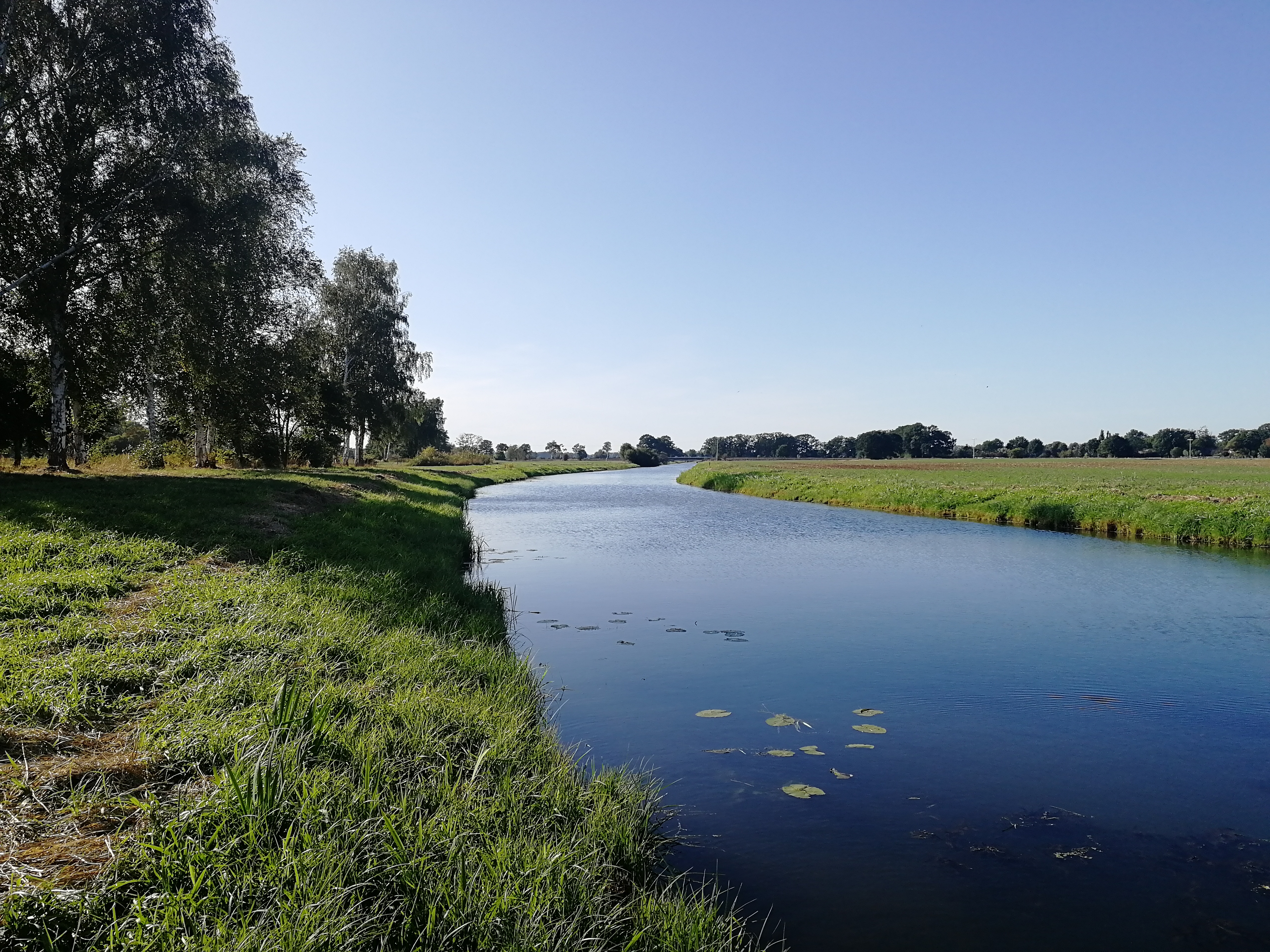

Location
- Country: Germany
- States: Lower Saxony; Saxony-Anhalt

Physical characteristics
- Source
  - location: at the Gielau Mill near Schnega
  - coordinates: 52°51′44″N 10°51′18″E
  - elevation: ca. 41 m (135 ft)
- Mouth
  - location: near Wustrow into the Jeetzel
  - coordinates: 52°55′46″N 11°07′32″E
  - elevation: ca. 17 m (56 ft)
- Length: 32.5 km (20.2 mi)
- Basin size: 275 km (171 mi)

Basin features
- Progression: Jeetzel→ Elbe→ North Sea

Wustrower Dumme is a river of the German states Saxony-Anhalt and Lower Saxony. It is a roughly 32 kilometres (20 mi) long, and a left, western tributary of the Jeetzel (also: Jeetze).

== Course ==
The Dumme runs through the border region between Altmark in the south and Wendland in the north; in places it forms the border river between Lower Saxony and Saxony-Anhalt. During its course it passes Bergen an der Dumme, before discharging into the northward-flowing Jeetzel near Wustrow, hence the first part of the name.

== See also ==
- Salzwedeler Dumme
- List of rivers of Lower Saxony
- List of rivers of Saxony-Anhalt
