= Neuekrug =

- Ortsteil of Diesdorf
- Interactive map of Neuekrug
- Location within Germany Location within Saxony-Anhalt
- Coordinates: 52°46′24″N 10°48′00″E
- Country: Germany
- State: Saxony-Anhalt
- District: Altmarkkreis Salzwedel
- Municipality: Diesdorf

Area
  - Total: 17.97 km^{2} (6.94 sq mi)
- Elevation: 76 m (249 ft)

Population (2006-12-31)
  - Total: 192
  - Density: 10.7/km^{2} (27.7/sq mi)
- Time zone: UTC+01:00 (CET)
  - Summer (DST): UTC+02:00 (CEST)
- Postal codes: 29413
- Dialling codes: 03902
- Vehicle registration: SAW

Neuekrug is a village and a former municipality in the district Altmarkkreis Salzwedel, in Saxony-Anhalt, Germany. Since 1 January 2010, it is part of the municipality Diesdorf. The municipality consisted of the three villages Höddelsen, Reddigau and Neuekrug. The Salzwedel Dumme river rises near Neuekrug-Höddelsen.
