= Lüchow (Samtgemeinde) =

Samtgemeinde in Lower Saxony, Germany

Lüchow (Wendland)
- Samtgemeinde
- Location of Lüchow (Wendland) within Lüchow-Dannenberg district
- Interactive map of Lüchow (Wendland)
- Location within Germany Location within Lower Saxony
- Coordinates: 52°58′N 11°09′E
- Country: Germany
- State: Lower Saxony
- District: Lüchow-Dannenberg
- Seat: Lüchow
- Subdivisions: 12 municipalities

Area
  - Total: 564.08 km^{2} (217.79 sq mi)

Population (2025-12-31)
  - Total: 23,076
  - Density: 40.909/km^{2} (105.95/sq mi)
- Time zone: UTC+01:00 (CET)
  - Summer (DST): UTC+02:00 (CEST)
- Website: www.luechow-wendland.de

Lüchow (Wendland) is a Samtgemeinde ("collective municipality") in the district of Lüchow-Dannenberg, in Lower Saxony, Germany. Its seat is in the town Lüchow, with a branch office in Clenze.

The Samtgemeinde Lüchow (Wendland) consists of the following municipalities:

1. Bergen an der Dumme
2. Clenze
3. Küsten
4. Lemgow
5. Lübbow
6. Lüchow
7. Luckau
8. Schnega
9. Trebel
10. Waddeweitz
11. Woltersdorf
12. Wustrow
