= Küsten =

- Municipality
- Location of Küsten within Lüchow-Dannenberg district
- Interactive map of Küsten
- Location within Germany Location within Lower Saxony
- Coordinates: 52°59′N 11°04′E
- Country: Germany
- State: Lower Saxony
- District: Lüchow-Dannenberg
- Municipal assoc.: Lüchow (Wendland)
- Subdivisions: 18 Ortsteile

Government
  - Mayor: Michael Schulz (FW)

Area
  - Total: 41.27 km^{2} (15.93 sq mi)
- Elevation: 22 m (72 ft)

Population (2025-12-31)
  - Total: 1,315
  - Density: 31.86/km^{2} (82.53/sq mi)
- Time zone: UTC+01:00 (CET)
  - Summer (DST): UTC+02:00 (CEST)
- Postal codes: 29482
- Dialling codes: 05841
- Vehicle registration: DAN

Küsten is a municipality in the district Lüchow-Dannenberg, in Lower Saxony, Germany.
