= Trebel =

- Municipality
- Location of Trebel within Lüchow-Dannenberg district
- Interactive map of Trebel
- Location within Germany Location within Lower Saxony
- Coordinates: 53°00′N 11°19′E
- Country: Germany
- State: Lower Saxony
- District: Lüchow-Dannenberg
- Municipal assoc.: Lüchow

Government
  - Mayor: Wolfgang Wiegreffe

Area
  - Total: 66.44 km^{2} (25.65 sq mi)
- Elevation: 17 m (56 ft)

Population (2025-12-31)
  - Total: 928
  - Density: 14.0/km^{2} (36.2/sq mi)
- Time zone: UTC+01:00 (CET)
  - Summer (DST): UTC+02:00 (CEST)
- Postal codes: 29494
- Dialling codes: 05848
- Vehicle registration: DAN
- Website: www.trebel.de

Trebel is a municipality in the district Lüchow-Dannenberg, in Lower Saxony, Germany.
