= Lübbow =

- Municipality
- Location of Lübbow within Lüchow-Dannenberg district
- Interactive map of Lübbow
- Location within Germany Location within Lower Saxony
- Coordinates: 52°55′N 11°11′E
- Country: Germany
- State: Lower Saxony
- District: Lüchow-Dannenberg
- Municipal assoc.: Lüchow (Wendland)
- Subdivisions: 3 Ortsteile

Government
  - Mayor: Herbert Bosselmann (SPD)

Area
  - Total: 19.52 km^{2} (7.54 sq mi)
- Elevation: 23 m (75 ft)

Population (2025-12-31)
  - Total: 823
  - Density: 42.2/km^{2} (109/sq mi)
- Time zone: UTC+01:00 (CET)
  - Summer (DST): UTC+02:00 (CEST)
- Postal codes: 29488
- Dialling codes: 05883
- Vehicle registration: DAN

Lübbow (German pronunciation: [ˈlʏboː]) is a municipality in the district Lüchow-Dannenberg, in Lower Saxony, Germany.
