= Stones Fan Museum =

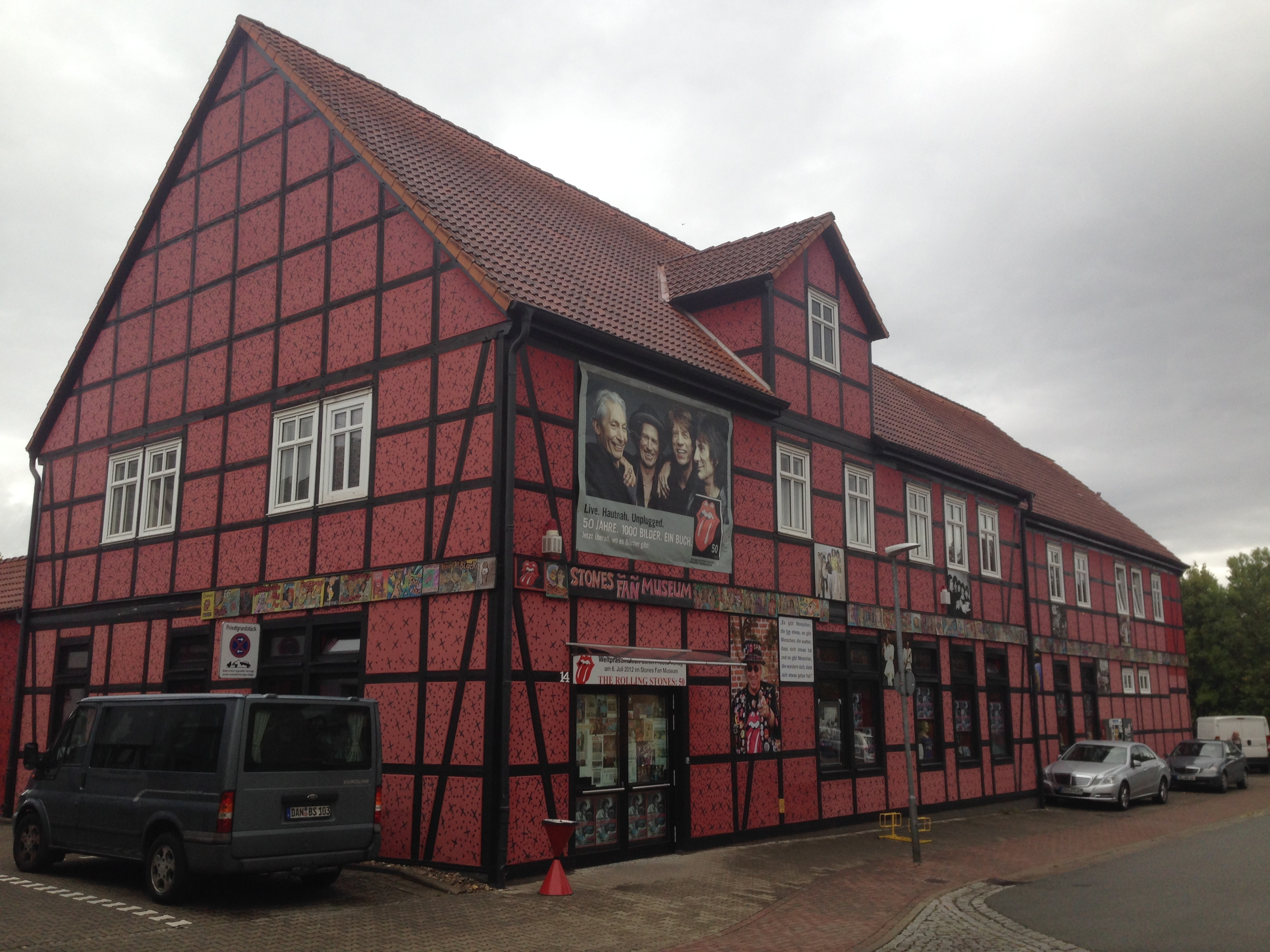

- Location within Germany
- Established: May 2011
- Location: Lüchow, Lower Saxony, Germany
- Coordinates: 52°58′4.856″N 11°9′16.293″E
- Type: musicians museum
- Collections: The Rolling Stones
- Founder: Ulrich (Ulli) Schröder
- Website: stonesfanmuseum.com

The Stones Fan Museum is a museum in Lüchow in Lower Saxony, Germany, that was founded in 2011. It is dedicated to the British rock band The Rolling Stones. The museum is a member of the Museumsverbund Lüchow-Dannenberg.

== History and background ==
The museum was opened in May 2011, when the museum was still under construction. Fans from several European countries attended the opening. The founder of the museum is Ulrich (Ulli) Schröder, a former bank employee and fan from the beginning. In 1965, when he was 15 years old, he visited all three concerts of the Stones in Germany. The construction of the museum was completed in April 2012.

The museum has been established in a former supermarket, and has an exhibition area of 1,000 square metres. From the district government of Lüchow-Dannenberg he was granted a tourist incentive of 100,000 euros. A delegation from Universal Records came to Lüchow to prevent a name like The Rolling Stones Museum. It was agreed then to change the name into Rolling-Stones-Fan-Museum, which was later shortened to Stones Fan Museum. Schröder also needed to place a portrait of himself in the front of the building to make clear that it was a fan initiative and not one by the Stones themselves.

The museum shows part of Schröder's collection, photos, paintings by a variety of artists including Ron Wood, posters, documents, musical instruments, golden records, puppets, pinball tables, a signed billiard table, a BMW Isetta, and many other objects. Next to that, an Irish pub and a podium for bands have been constructed. In the course of time, several tribute bands played here, as well as the 'unofficial Stone' Blondie Chaplin, and Chris Jagger, the younger brother of band member Mick Jagger.

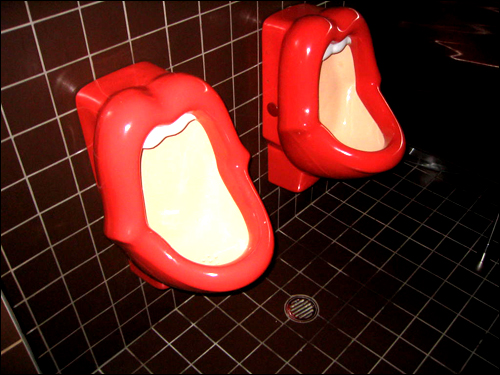
The disputed urinals

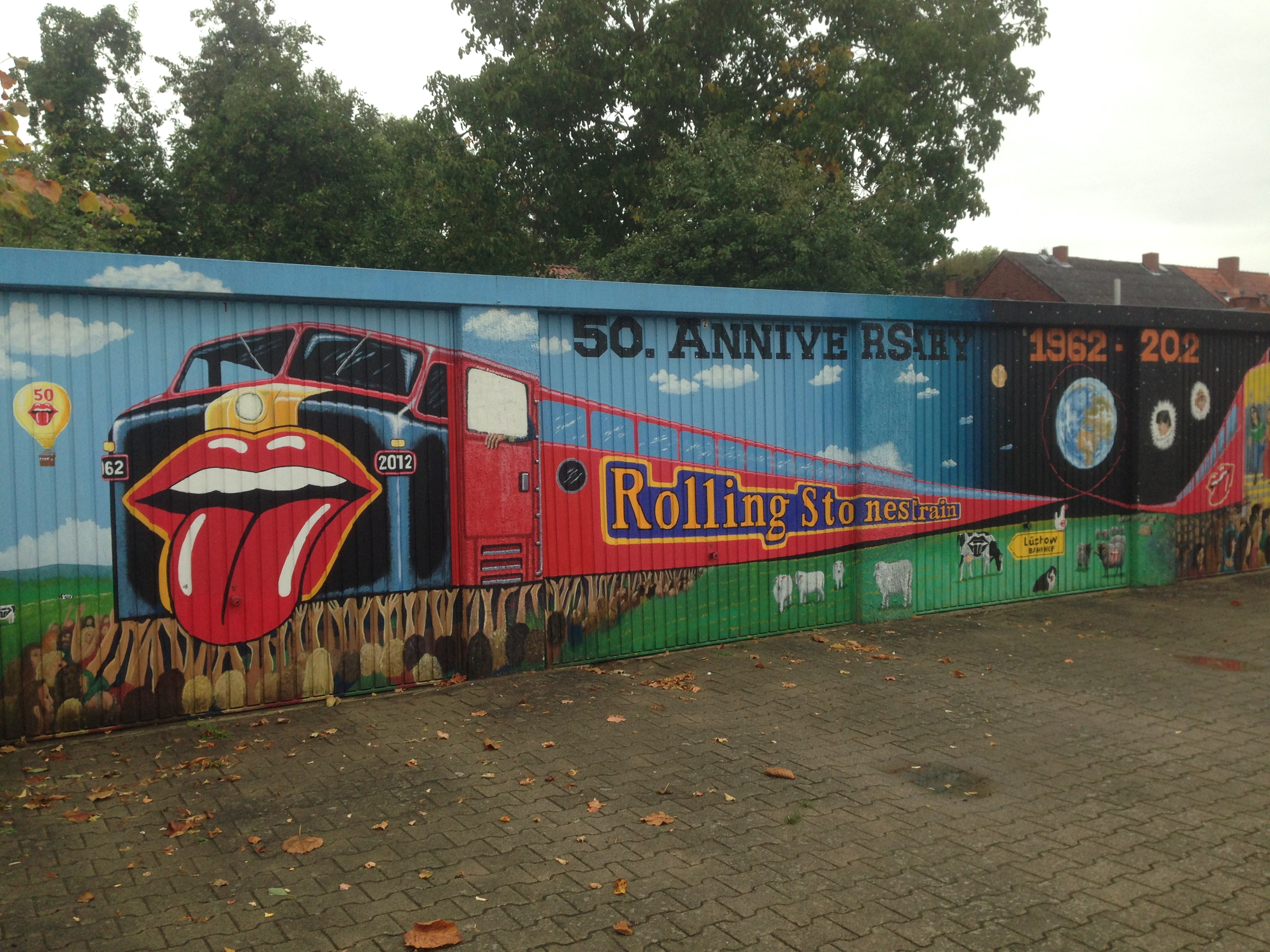
Stones mural in Lüchow

Within a year after the opening, the urinals, designed by the female Dutch artist Meike van Schijndel, where subject to controversy when feminists judged them to be sexist. The urinals have the shape of red lips and are inspired by the logo of The Rolling Stones. Back in 1971, the logo was inspired by the mouth of Mick Jagger. In this design, the tongue is left out, which gives a mere womanly look. Founder Ulli Schröder replied to the controversy with: "That's not a man's mouth or a woman's mouth, that's art. They were damned expensive and they're staying where they are and that’s final."

In 2012 Schröder and artist Heino Jacobsen made a design of a mural painting of forty metres in length. Subsequently, Jacobsen painted it on ten garage boxes in Lüchow, for six weeks, twelve hours a day. The artwork was inaugurated in July, when The Rolling Stones had their fiftieth anniversary. The image is not graffiti but is manually painted. It portrays a train and its major stations in the career of The Rolling Stones.

== Impressions ==
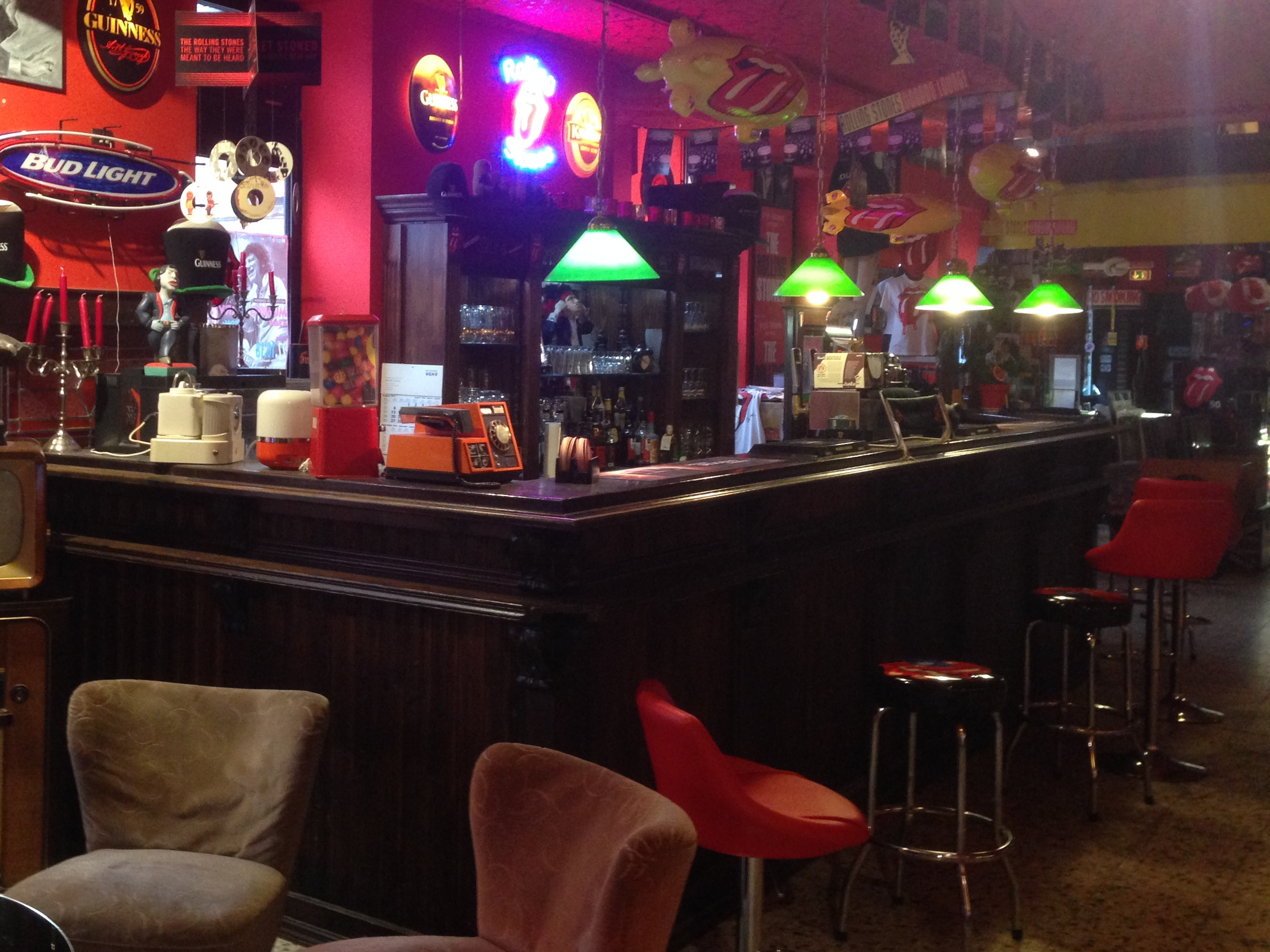
Bar

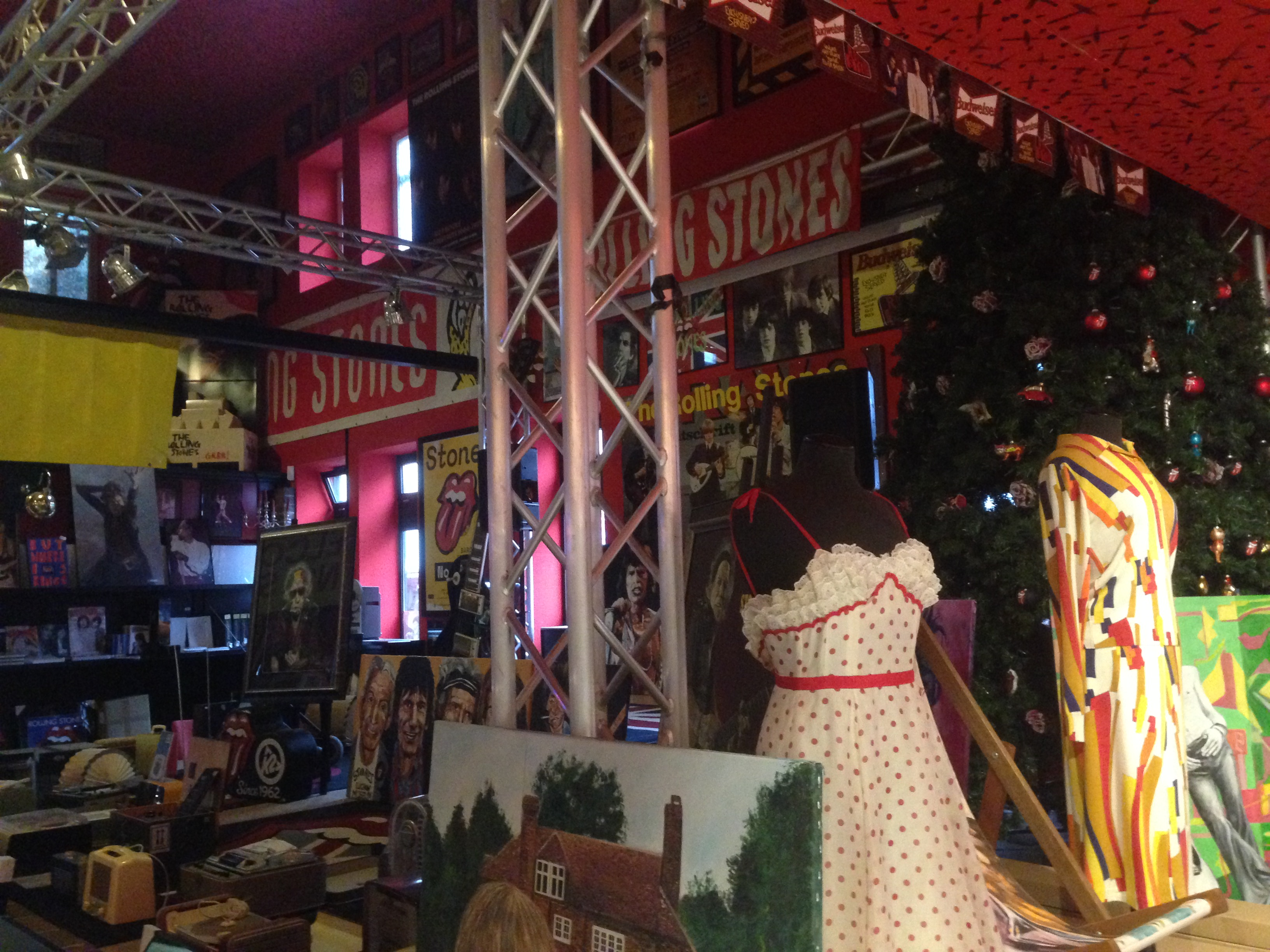
Podium

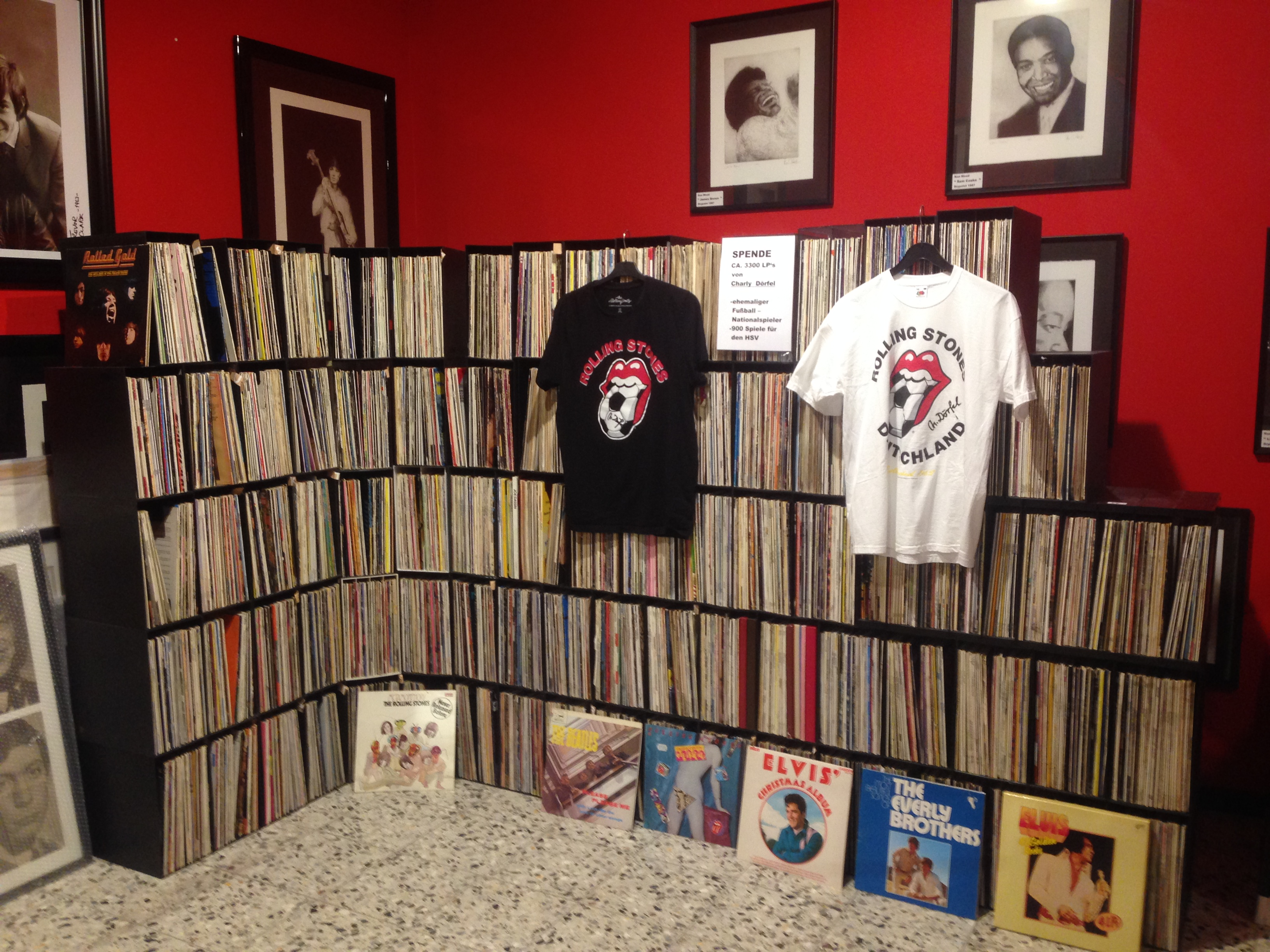
Record collection

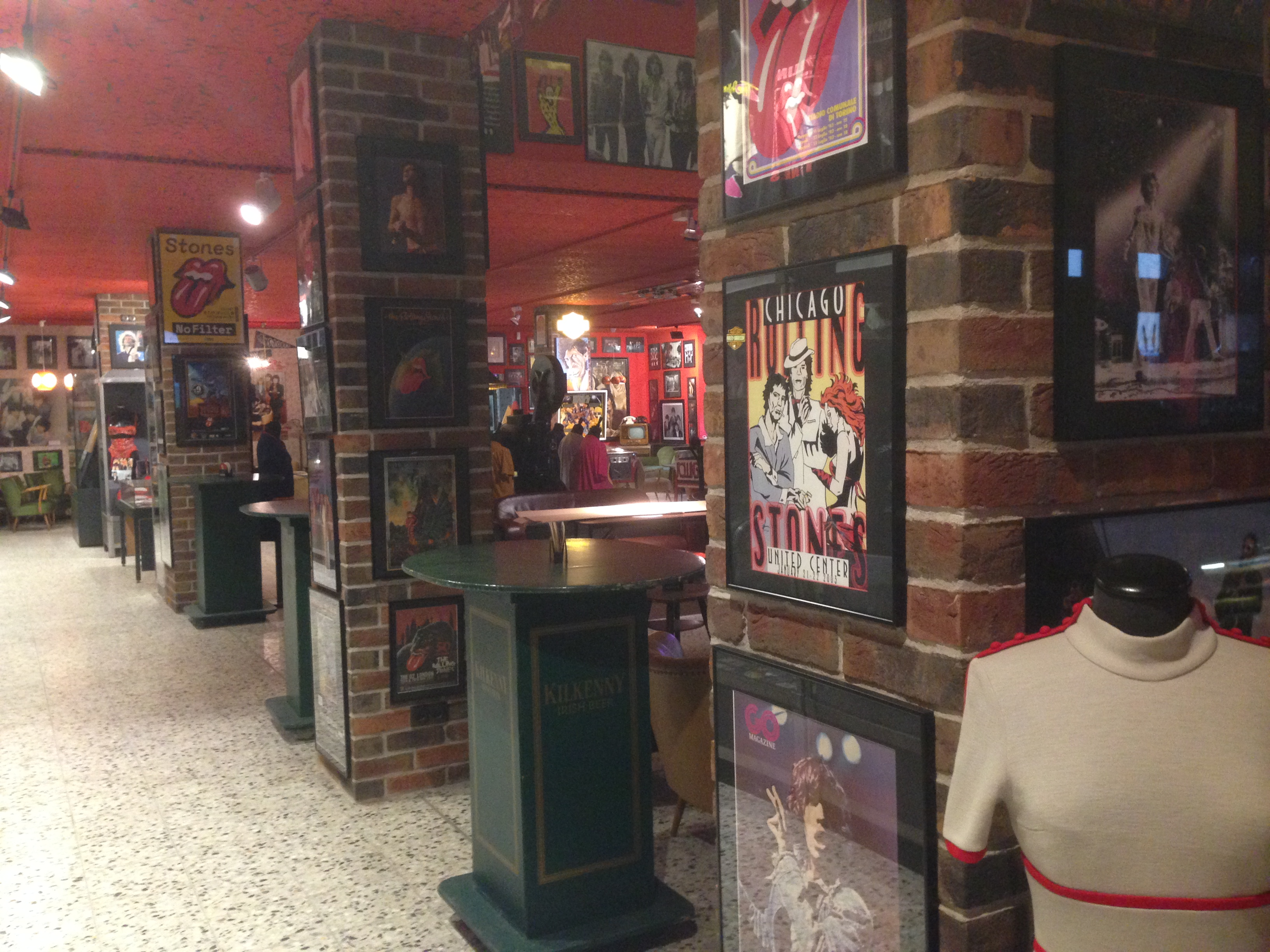
View in the museum

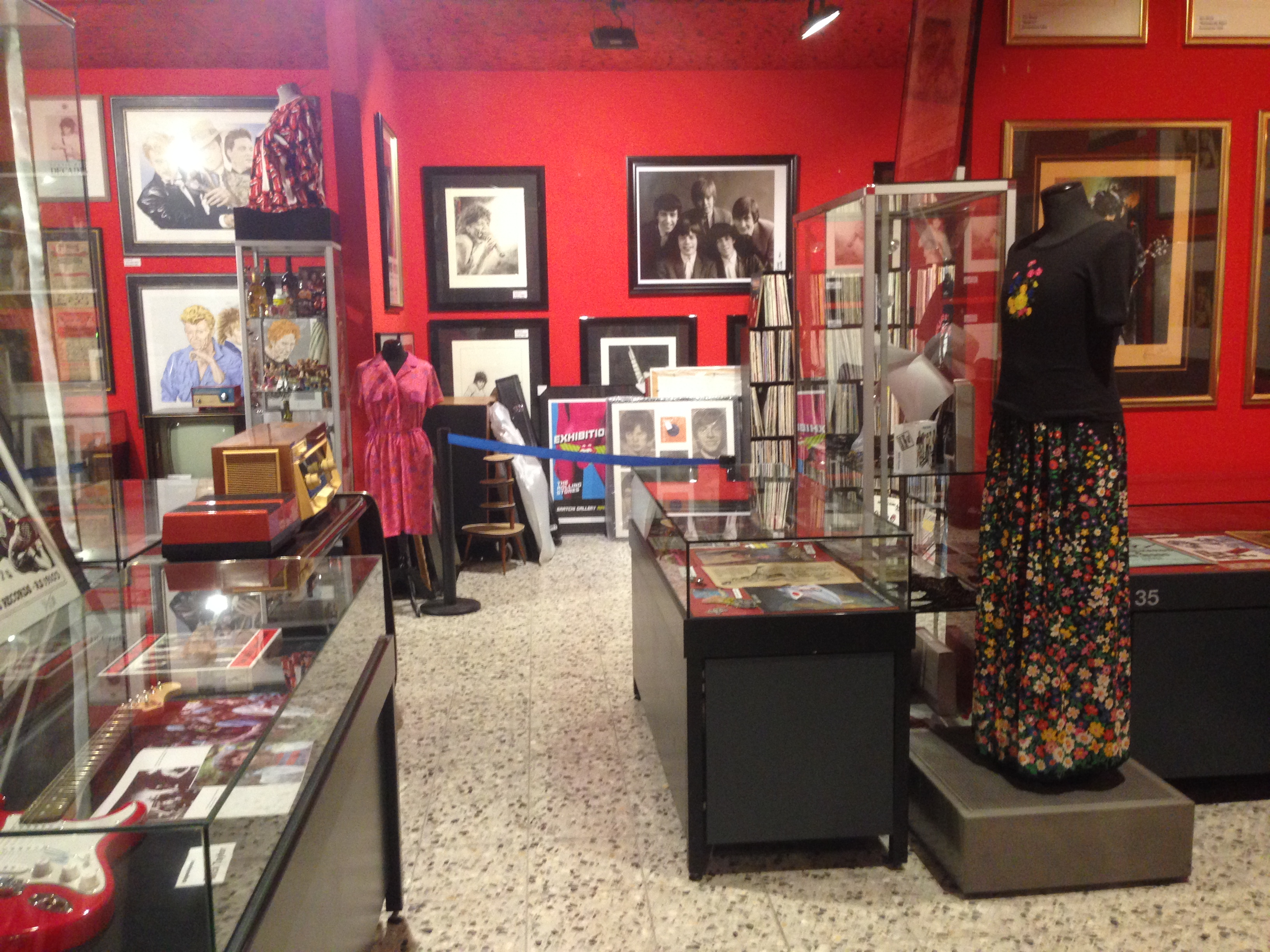
Another view in the museum

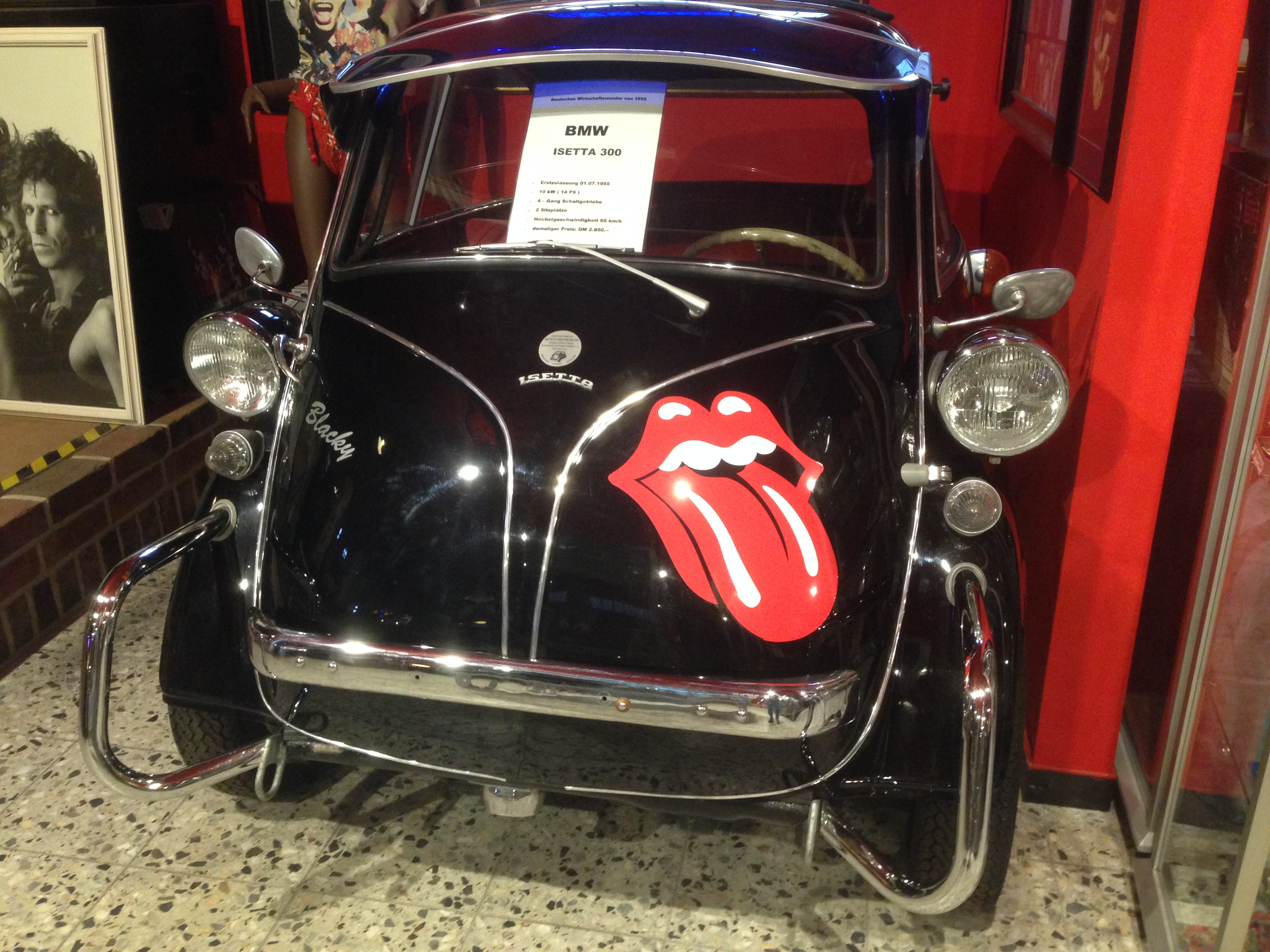
BMW Isetta

== See also ==
- The Rolling Stones Museum (Slovenia)
- List of museums in Germany
- List of music museums
