= The Rolling Stones Museum =

Coordinates: 45°30′41.38″N 13°36′16.905″E

- Location within Slovenia
- Location: Podvozna 15, Portorož
- Type: music museum
- Founder: Slavko Franca
- Owner: Slavko Franca

The Rolling Stones Museum is a museum in Portorož in Slovenia. It is dedicated to the British rock band The Rolling Stones. The music television programme VH1 proclaimed it in 2013 one of the "10 Truly Insane Music Museums + Shrines".

== Background ==
The origin of the collection goes back to 1964, when Slavko Franca (born 1949) bought his first LP of the band. This was the beginning of the extended collection of memorabilia that can be seen in the museum today. His profession as ship chief engineer enabled him to collect items from all over the world. He started his museum at his home in Portorož, a coastal village in the Slovenian part of Istria.

Franca had been a fan since the band began and has travelled to around fifty concerts worldwide to see shows of them. The first one was in Milan in Italy. The band, which has given more than 1,700 concerts in 40 countries, has never played in Slovenia. The 50th anniversary celebration in London was celebrated at the museum by three hundred guests and a concert by Chris Jagger, the younger brother of band member Mick.

The music television programme VH1 proclaimed the museum in 2013 one of the "10 Truly Insane Music Museums + Shrines."

== Collection ==
The museum houses a collection of around 1,000 artifacts, among which the guitar pick that band member Keith Richards once threw to Franca during a show in Belgium. In addition, there are oil paintings, posters, photos, records, beer glasses, T-shirts, fan articles, magazines, newspaper articles, musical instruments such as a guitar with signatures, and other memorabilia.

== See also ==
- Stones Fan Museum (Germany)
- List of music museums
