= Opolye, Vladimir Oblast =

Opolye Ополье
- Selo
- Location within Vladimir Oblast Location within Russia
- Coordinates: 56°33′N 39°38′E
- Country: Russia
- Region: Vladimir Oblast
- District: Yuryev-Polsky District
- Time zone: UTC+3:00

Opolye (Russian: Ополье) is a rural locality (a selo) in Krasnoselskoye Rural Settlement, Yuryev-Polsky District, Vladimir Oblast, Russia. The population was 736 as of 2010.

== Geography ==
Opolye is located 7 km north of Yuryev-Polsky (the district's administrative centre) by road. Fedosyino is the nearest rural locality.
