= Salzwedeler Dumme =

River in Germany

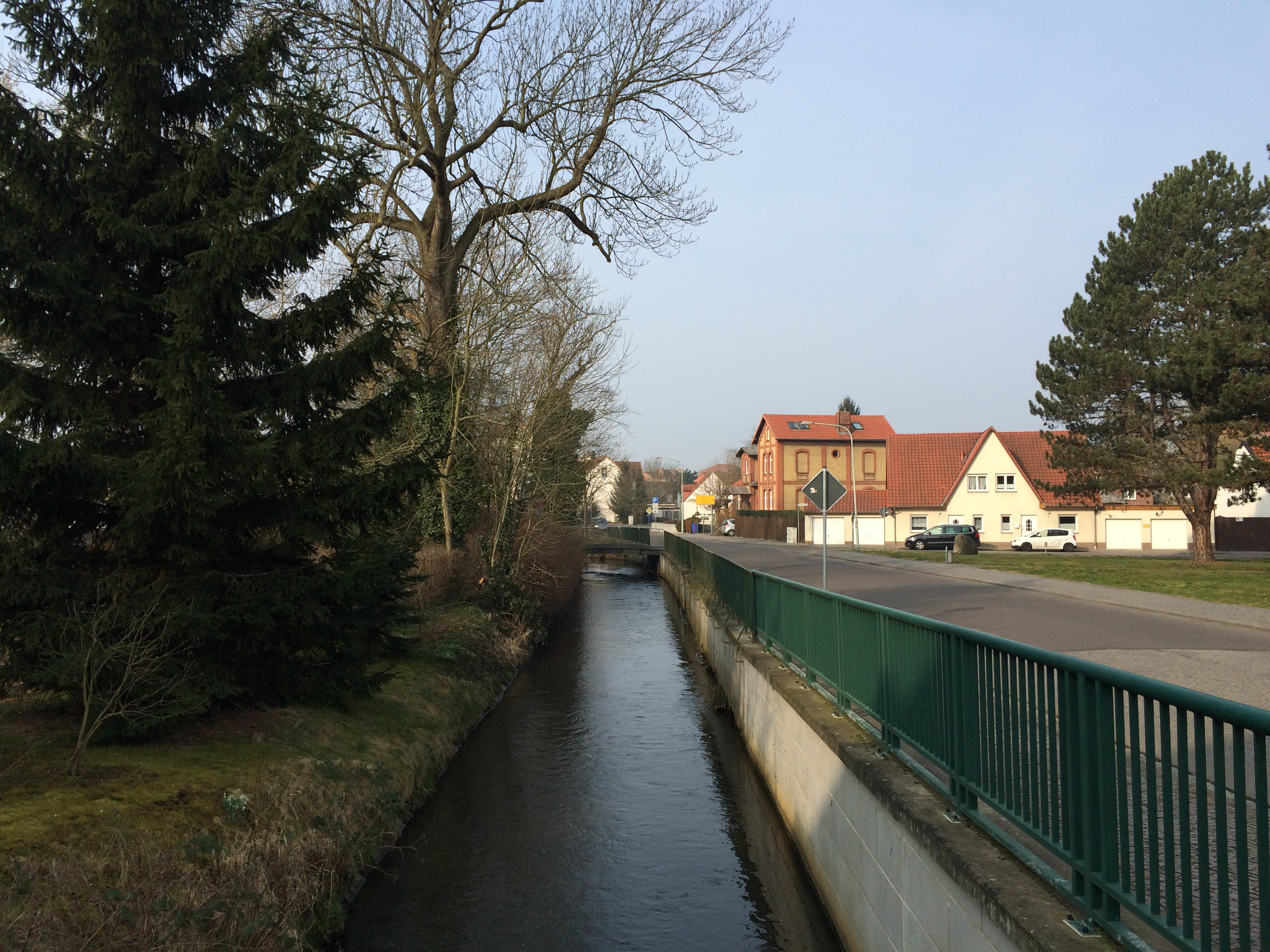

Location
- Country: Germany
- State: Saxony-Anhalt

Physical characteristics
- Source
  - location: near Neuekrug
  - coordinates: 52°46′26″N 10°48′31″E
  - elevation: ca. 75 m
- Mouth
  - location: in Salzwedel into the Jeetze
  - coordinates: 52°51′24″N 11°09′13″E
  - elevation: ca. 21 m

Basin features
- Progression: Jeetzel→ Elbe→ North Sea

The Salzwedeler Dumme is a left, western tributary of the Jeetzel (also: Jeetze) in Saxony-Anhalt, Germany.

== Course ==
The Salzwedeler Dumme runs a few kilometres south of the border with the neighbouring state of Lower Saxony in the Altmark region. It rises near Neuekrug-Höddelsen and passes inter alia the municipality of Dähre, before discharging into the northward-flowing Jeetzel at Salzwedel, hence the first part of the name.

== See also ==
- Wustrower Dumme
- List of rivers of Saxony-Anhalt
