= Schnega =

- Municipality
- Location of Schnega within Lüchow-Dannenberg district
- Interactive map of Schnega
- Location within Germany Location within Lower Saxony
- Coordinates: 52°53′N 10°53′E
- Country: Germany
- State: Lower Saxony
- District: Lüchow-Dannenberg
- Municipal assoc.: Lüchow (Wendland)
- Subdivisions: 14 Ortsteile

Government
  - Mayor: Annegret Gerstenkorn (CDU)

Area
  - Total: 53.95 km^{2} (20.83 sq mi)
- Elevation: 45 m (148 ft)

Population (2025-12-31)
  - Total: 1,154
  - Density: 21.39/km^{2} (55.40/sq mi)
- Time zone: UTC+01:00 (CET)
  - Summer (DST): UTC+02:00 (CEST)
- Postal codes: 29465
- Dialling codes: 05842
- Vehicle registration: DAN

Schnega is a municipality in the district Lüchow-Dannenberg, in Lower Saxony, Germany.

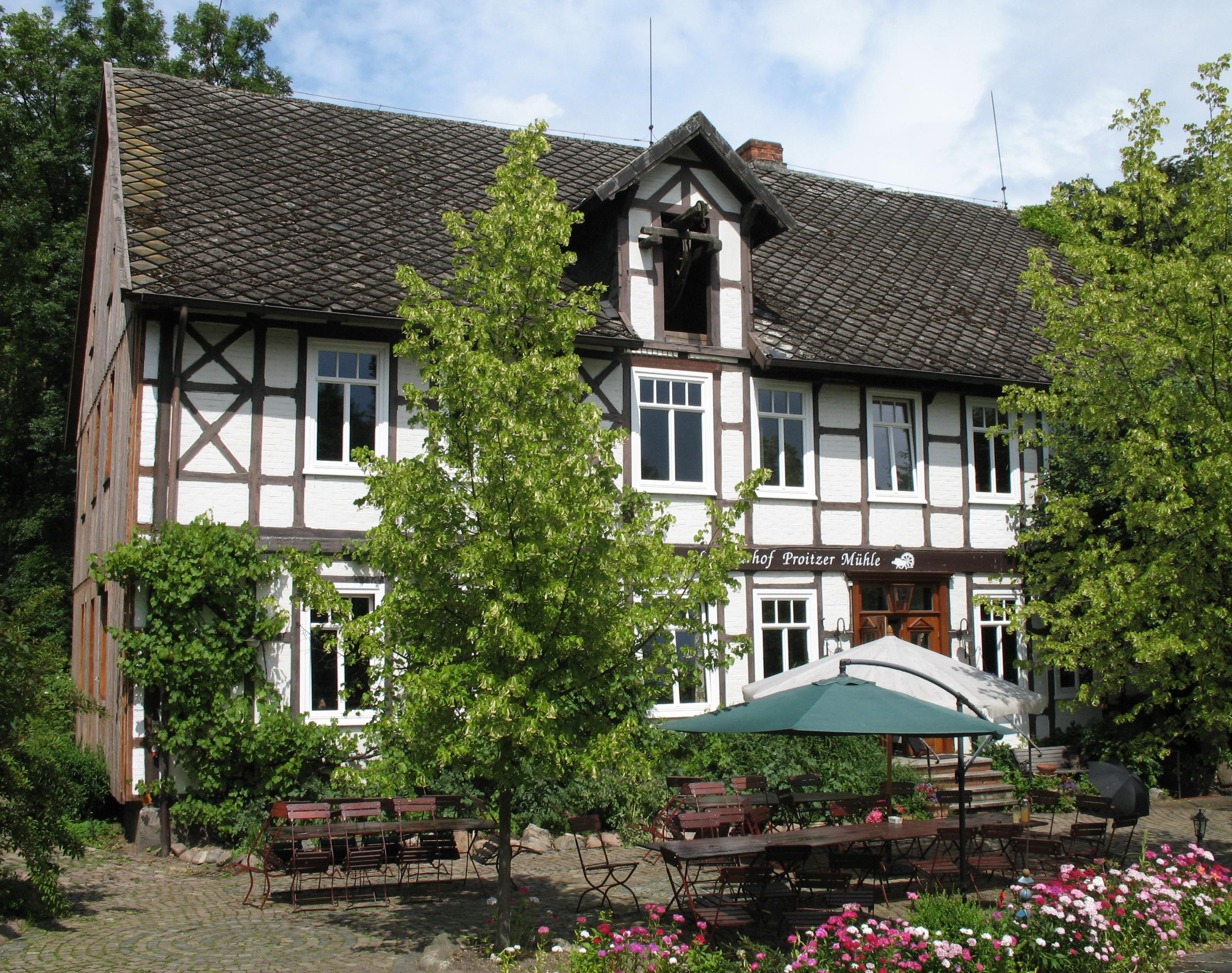
Watermill in Proitze
