= Thurau =

Thurau is a German surname. Notable people with the surname include:

- Björn Thurau (born 1988), German road racing cyclist
- Dietrich Thurau (born 1954), German road racing cyclist
- Friedrich Thurau (1843–1913), German entomologist
