= Lemgow =

- Municipality
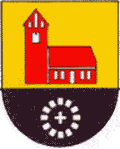
- Coat of arms

- Location of Lemgow within Lüchow-Dannenberg district
- Interactive map of Lemgow
- Location within Germany Location within Lower Saxony
- Coordinates: 52°55′N 11°17′E
- Country: Germany
- State: Lower Saxony
- District: Lüchow-Dannenberg
- Municipal assoc.: Lüchow (Wendland)
- Subdivisions: 12 Ortsteile

Government
  - Mayor: Horst Kaufmann (CDU)

Area
  - Total: 64.48 km^{2} (24.90 sq mi)
- Elevation: 24 m (79 ft)

Population (2025-12-31)
  - Total: 1,329
  - Density: 20.61/km^{2} (53.38/sq mi)
- Time zone: UTC+01:00 (CET)
  - Summer (DST): UTC+02:00 (CEST)
- Postal codes: 29485
- Dialling codes: 05883
- Vehicle registration: DAN

Lemgow (German pronunciation: [ˈlɛmɡoː]) is a municipality in the district Lüchow-Dannenberg, in Lower Saxony, Germany.
