= Wustrow, Lower Saxony =

Wustrow
- Town
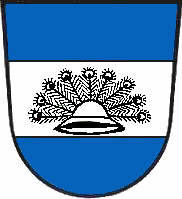
- Coat of arms

- Location of Wustrow within Lüchow-Dannenberg district
- Interactive map of Wustrow
- Location within Germany Location within Lower Saxony
- Coordinates: 52°55′19″N 11°07′18″E
- Country: Germany
- State: Lower Saxony
- District: Lüchow-Dannenberg
- Municipal assoc.: Lüchow (Wendland)

Government
  - Mayor: Andrea Heilemann

Area
  - Total: 30.19 km^{2} (11.66 sq mi)
- Elevation: 17 m (56 ft)

Population (2025-12-31)
  - Total: 2,528
  - Density: 83.74/km^{2} (216.9/sq mi)
- Time zone: UTC+01:00 (CET)
  - Summer (DST): UTC+02:00 (CEST)
- Postal codes: 29462
- Dialling codes: 05843
- Vehicle registration: DAN

Wustrow (German pronunciation: [ˈvʊstʁoː]) is a town in the Lüchow-Dannenberg district, in Lower Saxony, Germany. It is part of the Samtgemeinde ("collective municipality") Lüchow.

== Geography ==
=== Location ===
Wustrow is situated five kilometers (3.1 miles) south of the city Lüchow and eight kilometers (5.0 miles) north of Salzwedel.

The River Jeetzel flows through the town and north of the town flows the River Wustrower Dumme into the Jeetzel.

=== Subdivions ===
The town consists of the following subdivisions:

- Blütlingen
- Dolgow
- Ganse
- Güstritz
- Klennow
- Königshorst
- Lensian
- Neritz
- Schreyahn
- Teplingen
- Wustrow (Wendland)

== Local council ==
The elections in September 2013 showed the following results:

- Bunte Liste Wustrow (Coloured list Wustrow) - 4 seats
- CDU - 4 seats
- SPD - 3 seats
- Bürger statt Bürokratie (Citizens instead of bureaucracy) 2 seats
