= Jeetzel =

River in Germany

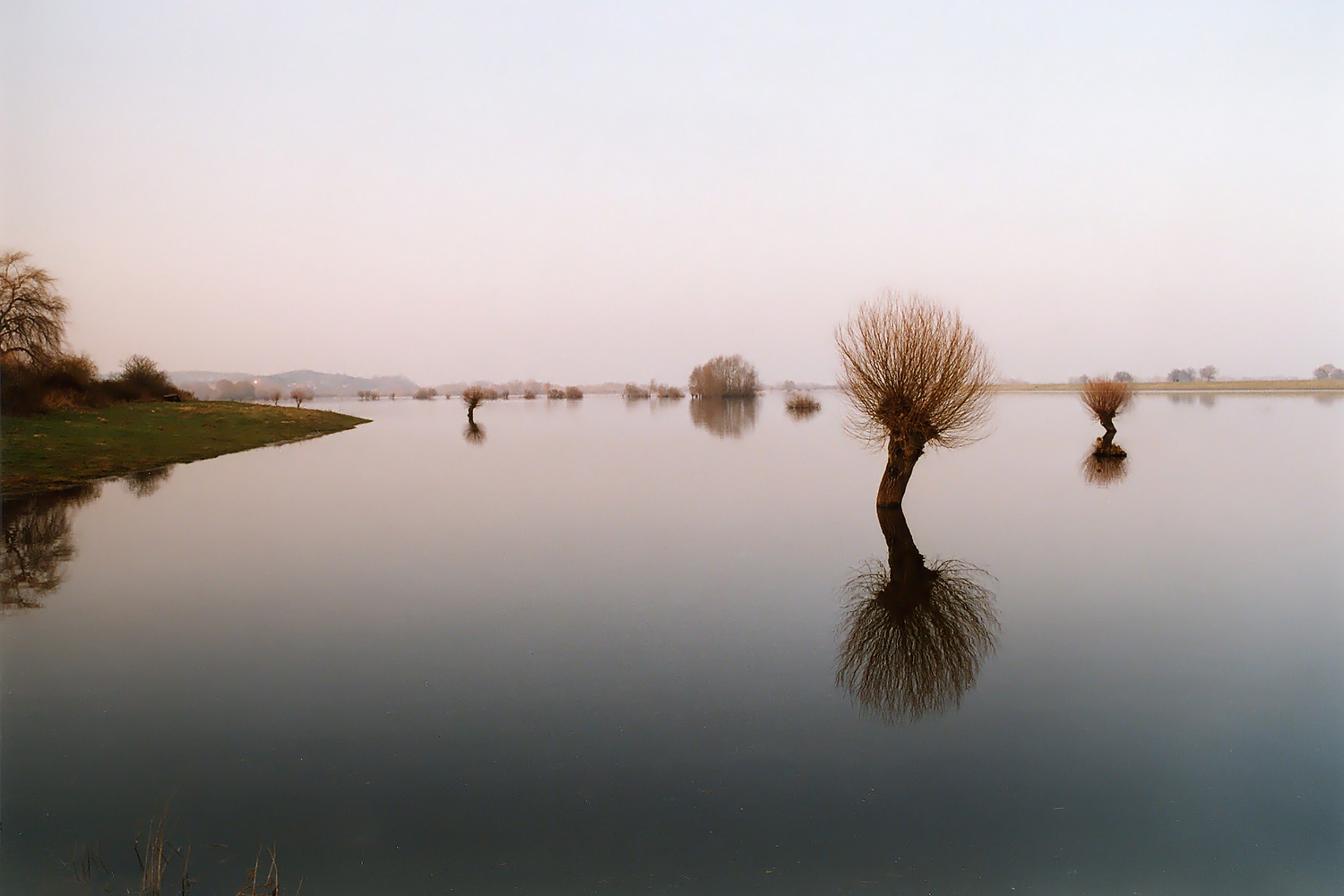
- The Jeetzel as it flows between Seerau and Hitzacker

Location
- Country: Germany

Physical characteristics
- Source
  - location: Altmark
- Mouth
  - location: Elbe
  - coordinates: 53°9′26″N 11°2′38″E
- Length: 73 km (45 mi)
- Basin size: 1,919 km^{2} (741 sq mi)

Basin features
- Progression: Elbe→ North Sea

The river Jeetzel (German pronunciation: [ˈjeːtsl̩]), which begins in the Altmark under the name Jeetze, flows from Saxony-Anhalt through Lower Saxony, in Germany. From its source near the village of Dönitz, it flows north through Beetzendorf, Salzwedel, Wustrow, Lüchow and Dannenberg, before joining the Elbe in Hitzacker. Its total length is 73 kilometres (45 mi).

A left tributary of the Elbe, the Jeetzel has itself several tributaries, including the Salzwedel Dumme and the Wustrow Dumme. The name is Slavic, and means ash (tree)-stream.

Historically, when the Elbe rose too high, it would flooded the Jeetzel, which flowed "backwards" and flooded the surrounding area. Today, a system of canals prevents such flooding.

== See also ==
- List of rivers of Saxony-Anhalt
- List of rivers of Lower Saxony
