= Lüchow-Dannenberg =

District in Lower Saxony, Germany

Coordinates: 53°00′N 11°10′E

- District
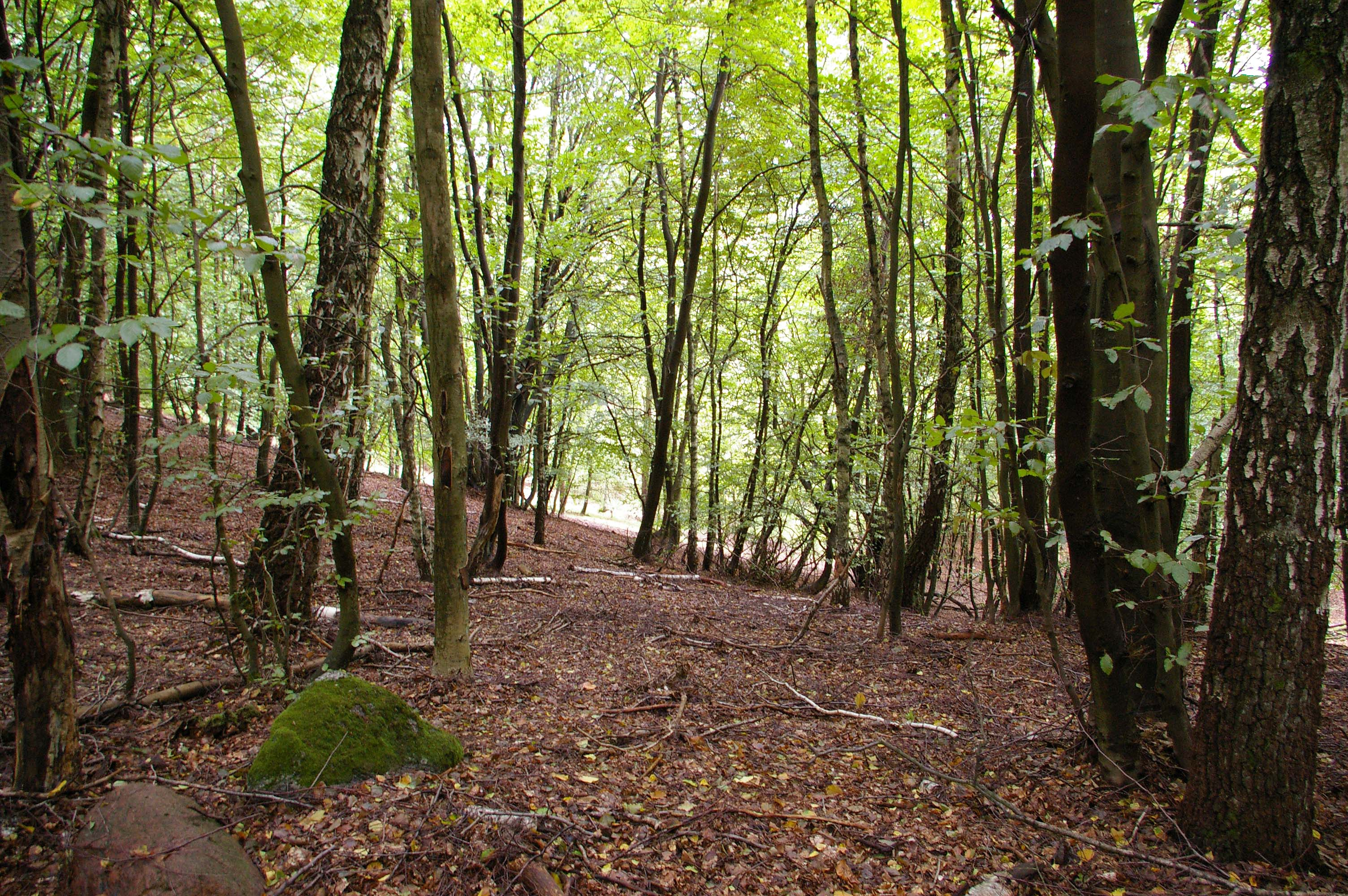

- Flag Coat of arms
- Country: Germany
- State: Lower Saxony
- Capital: Lüchow

Government
  - District admin.: Dagmar Schulz

Area
  - Total: 1,220 km^{2} (470 sq mi)

Population (31 December 2025)
  - Total: 46,471
  - Density: 38.1/km^{2} (98.7/sq mi)
- Time zone: UTC+01:00 (CET)
  - Summer (DST): UTC+02:00 (CEST)
- Vehicle registration: DAN
- Website: www.luechow-dannenberg.de

Lüchow-Dannenberg is a district in Lower Saxony, Germany, which is usually referred to as Hanoverian Wendland (Hannoversches Wendland) or Wendland. It is bounded by (from the west and clockwise) the districts of Uelzen and Lüneburg and the states of Mecklenburg-Western Pomerania (district of Ludwigslust-Parchim), Brandenburg (district of Prignitz), and Saxony-Anhalt (districts of Stendal and Altmarkkreis Salzwedel).

== History ==
In medieval times the counties of Lüchow and Dannenberg occupied the area (from the early 12th century on). These counties were originally Slavic states that lost their independence to the Duchy of Brunswick-Lüneburg in the beginning of the 14th century.

Since that time it was always an eastern extension of different entities, usually states like West Germany.

The area was ruled by Lüneburg until 1705 and then became a part of the Electorate of Hanover. When the Kingdom of Hanover was annexed by Prussia (1866), the districts of Lüchow and Dannenberg were established within the new Province of Hanover.

A Slavic language persisted here until the 18th century.

In 1932 the two districts of Lüchow and Dannenberg were merged into the current district with Dannenberg as capital. In 1951 the seat of the administration was moved to Lüchow.

== Current issues ==
Since the end of the 1990s the financial problems of the municipalities in the district grew more and more severe. To save money spent for administration a major municipal reform is currently discussed. The two most likely outcomes of the reform will be either a conversion of the district to an urban district, in which the 27 municipalities will then become boroughs of one town. The other discussed solution is the merger into two Samtgemeinden. The dissolution of the district and inclusion of the two remaining Samtgemeinden into the districts of Lüneburg and Uelzen are also discussed.

== Geography ==
The district is named for the two main towns. It is better known as the Wendland, a designation referring to the Slavic people of the Wends from Obotrite tribe Drevani, who lived there till the 18th century — the last known user of the local dialect of Polabian language died in 1752. The landscape is characterised by riverside woodlands along the Elbe river and a hilly countryside.

In addition, the Wendland is known for the small village of Gorleben (part of the Samtgemeinde Gartow), where the establishment of a final disposal place for radioactive waste was planned. The salt dome Gorleben, a deep geological repository was proposed. Moreover, an interim storage for spent nuclear fuel was located in Gorleben. The area was a site of clashes between the police and anti-nuclear protesters from the 1980s to the 2010s due to concerns over the suitability of the salt mine as a nuclear waste repository. The site was decommissioned in September 2021, and is currently in the process of being filled back up.

Lüchow-Dannenberg has a sister-city relationship with Steglitz-Zehlendorf, a borough of Berlin since 1979.

Lüchow-Dannenberg is the least populous of Germany's 400 districts, and has the lowest population density of any district in West Germany.

== Coat of arms ==
The coat of arms displays:

- a fir, which was the heraldic symbol of the counts of Dannenberg
- three yellow rhombs from the arms of the counts of Lüchow

== Towns and municipalities ==
Clickable map of towns and municipalities in the district

Samtgemeinden (collective municipalities) with member municipalities
- 1. Elbtalaue
1. Damnatz
2. Dannenberg (Elbe)^{1, 2}
3. Göhrde
4. Gusborn
5. Hitzacker^{2}
6. Jameln
7. Karwitz
8. Langendorf
9. Neu Darchau
10. Zernien
- 2. Gartow
1. Gartow^{1}
2. Gorleben
3. Höhbeck
4. Prezelle
5. Schnackenburg^{2}
- 3. Lüchow
1. Bergen an der Dumme
2. Clenze
3. Küsten
4. Lemgow
5. Luckau (Wendland)
6. Lübbow
7. Lüchow^{1, 2}
8. Schnega
9. Trebel
10. Waddeweitz
11. Woltersdorf
12. Wustrow^{2}
^{1}seat of the Samtgemeinde; ^{2}town

== People ==
See People from Lüchow-Dannenberg.
