= Lüchow =

- Town
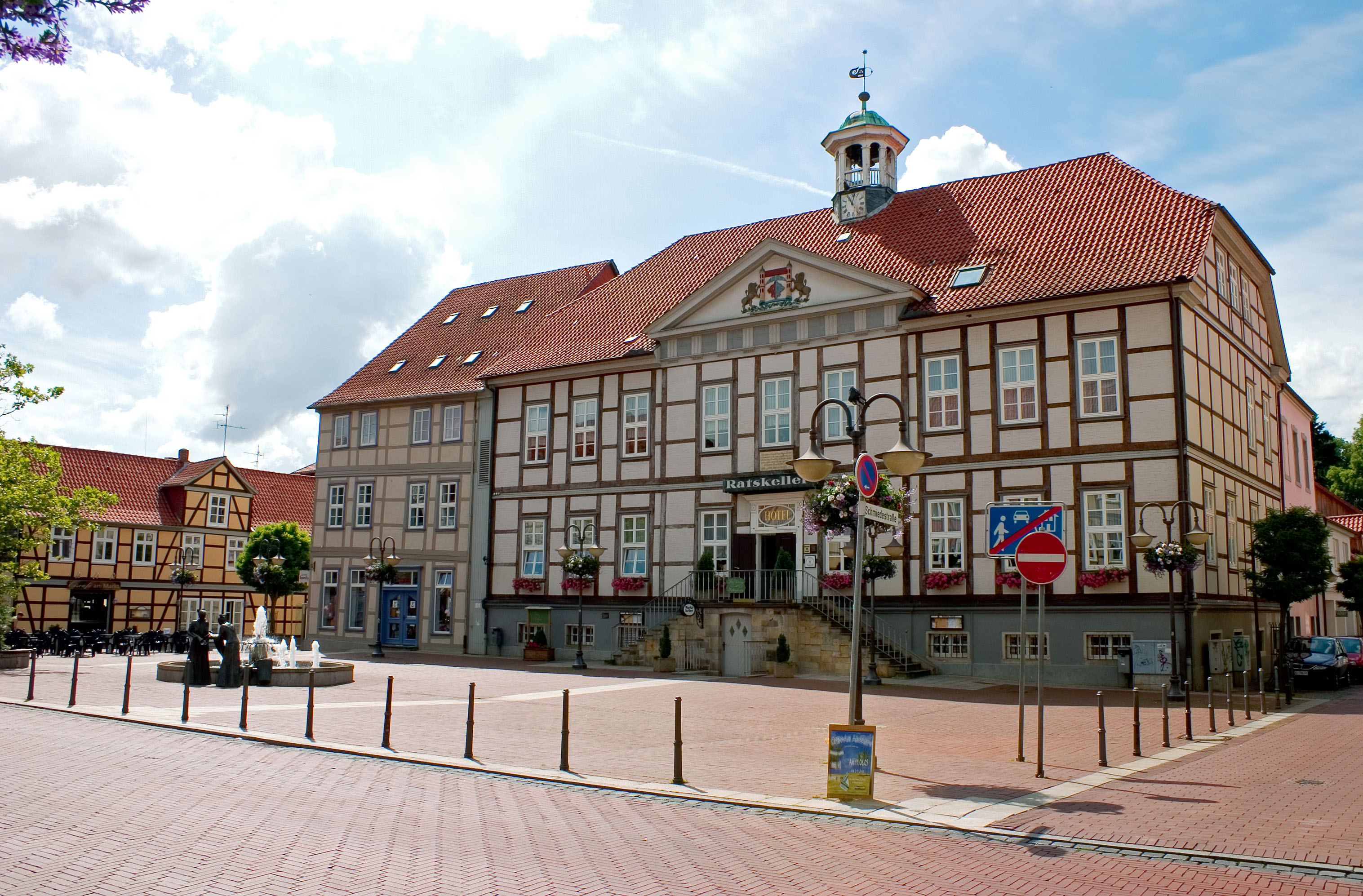
- The marketplace with the old City Hall

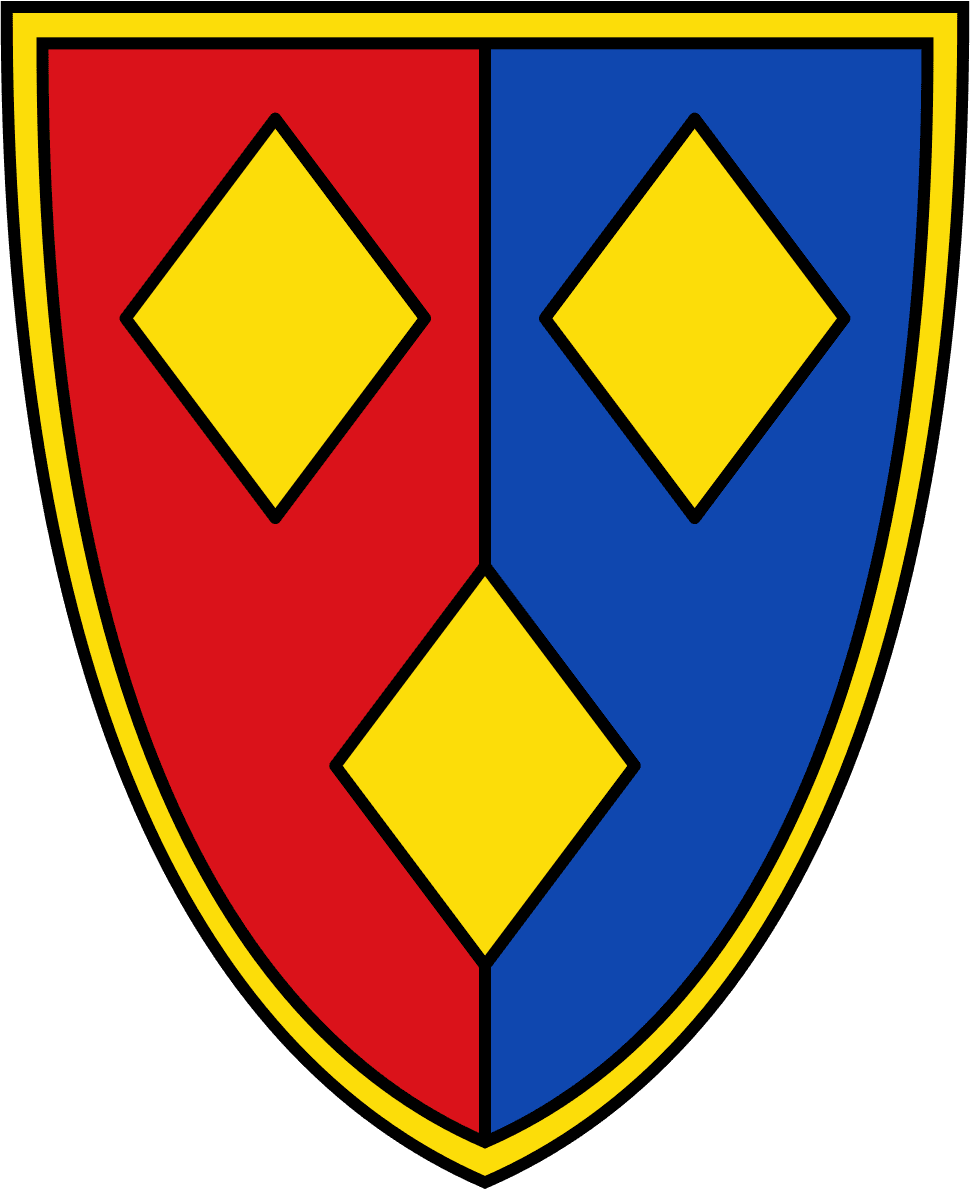
- Coat of arms

- Location of Lüchow within Lüchow-Dannenberg district
- Interactive map of Lüchow
- Location within Germany Location within Lower Saxony
- Coordinates: 52°58′N 11°09′E
- Country: Germany
- State: Lower Saxony
- District: Lüchow-Dannenberg
- Subdivisions: 7 Ortsteile

Government
  - Mayor: Torsten Petersen

Area
  - Total: 89.46 km^{2} (34.54 sq mi)
- Elevation: 18 m (59 ft)

Population (2025-12-31)
  - Total: 9,125
  - Density: 102.0/km^{2} (264.2/sq mi)
- Time zone: UTC+01:00 (CET)
  - Summer (DST): UTC+02:00 (CEST)
- Postal codes: 29439
- Dialling codes: 05841
- Vehicle registration: DAN
- Website: www.luechow.de

Lüchow (German pronunciation: [ˈlyːçoː]; Polabian: Ľauχ́üv) (Note: Spelled Lgauchi or Lieuschü in older German reference material.) is a city in northeastern Lower Saxony, Germany. It is the seat of the Samtgemeinde ("collective municipality") Lüchow, and is the capital of the district Lüchow-Dannenberg. Situated in the historical region of Wendland, approximately 13 km (8.1 mi) north of Salzwedel, Lüchow is located on the German Framework Road.

In Lüchow one can find the Stones Fan Museum. The museum is dedicated to the Rolling Stones and was founded in 2011.

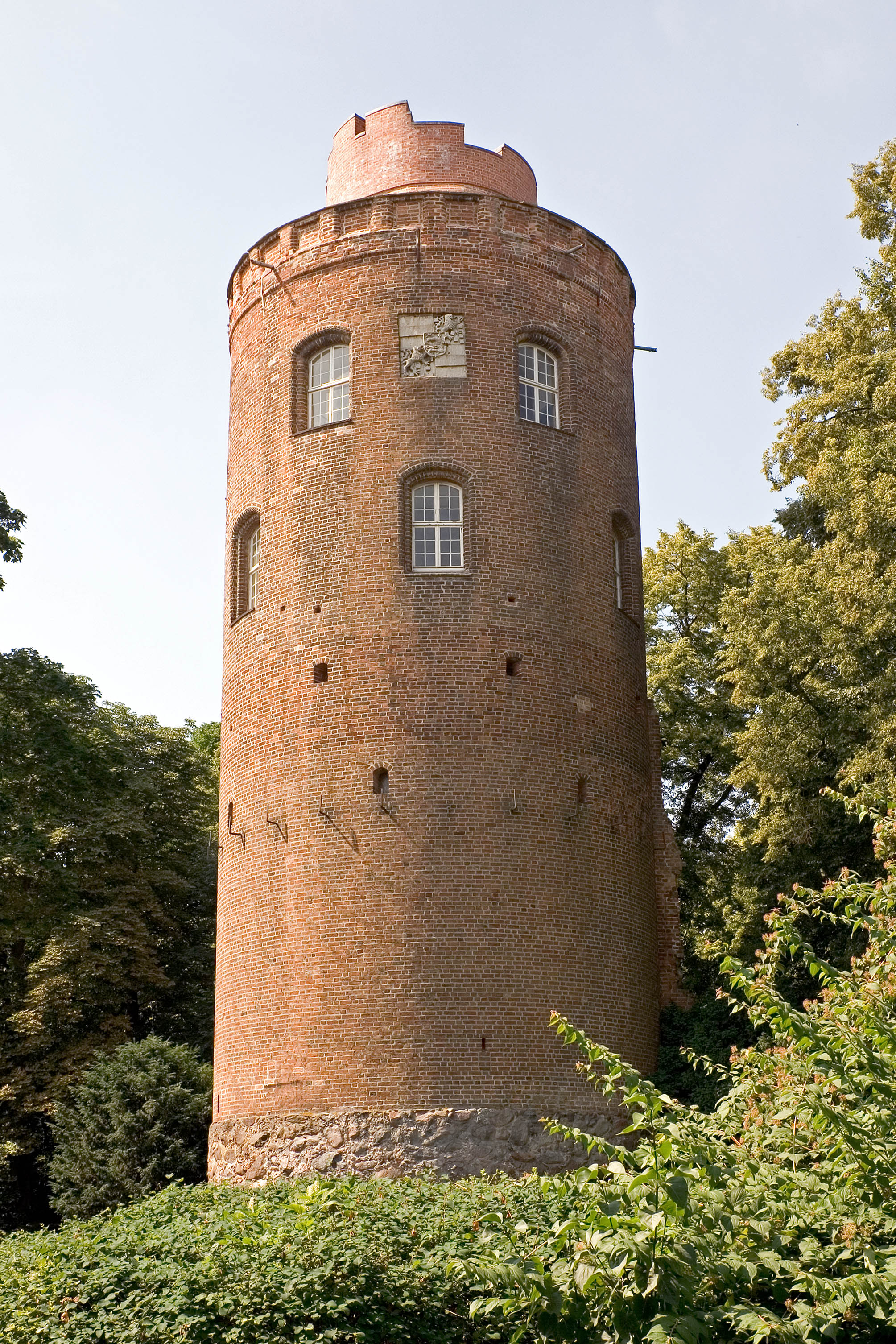
The "Amtsturm", a remnant of the Schloss

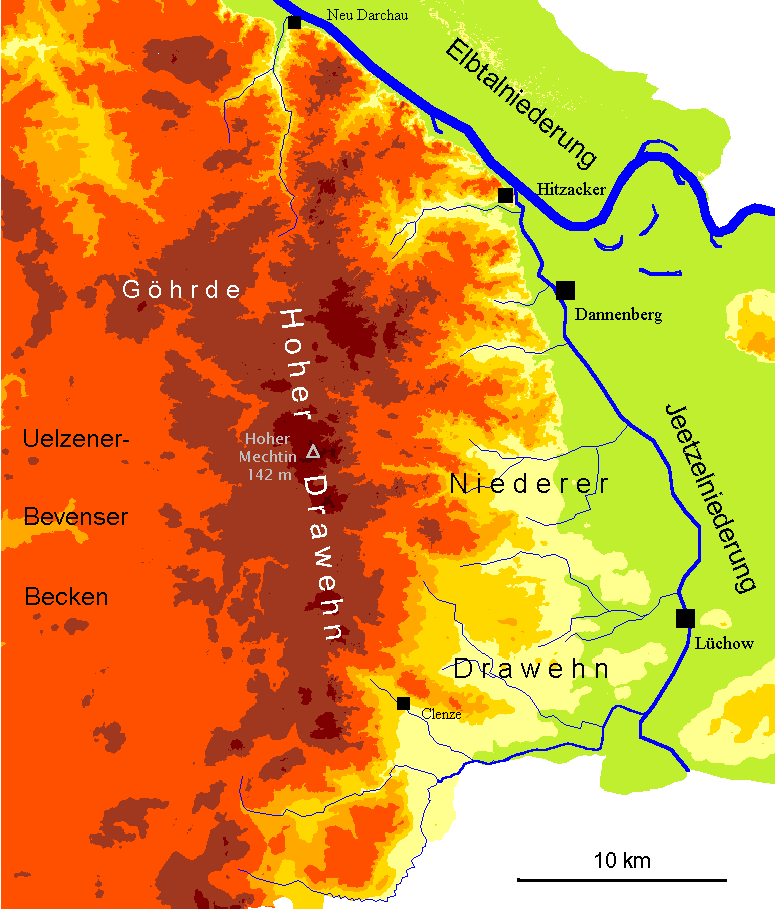
Map of the surrounding Drawehn landscape

== Geography ==
The river Jeetzel, a tributary of the Elbe, flows through the city. The surrounding landscape was created by glacial action, rising in the west, lower in the east.

A total of 89 km^{2} (34 sq mi) are within the limits of the city, which is divided into 24 boroughs:

- Banneick
- Beutow
- Bösel
- Gollau
- Grabow
- Jabel
- Jeetzel
- Kolborn
- Krautze
- Künsche
- Loge
- Lüchow
- Lüsen
- Müggenburg
- Plate
- Ranzau
- Reddebeitz
- Reetze
- Rehbeck
- Saaße
- Satemin
- Seerau in der Lucie
- Tarmitz
- Weitsche

Several of the boroughs are named for, and generally represent, previously independent settlements which Lüchow has incorporated.

The site was first mentioned in 1158, and received city rights in 1293. The only remnant of the fortifications built to defend in the late Middle Ages is a tower, which was adapted and used as a bell tower by St John's Church. A gate was erected in 1555 which divided the city centre from its western suburbs; this gate was demolished in 1793. Lüchow suffered from an outbreak of the Plague in 1537, and barely half a century later, in 1589, was largely destroyed by fire. Another fire in 1608 destroyed much of what had been rebuilt. The worst fire, in 1811, destroyed even the city hall and the Schloss.

== Climate ==
Climate data for Lüchow (1991–2020 normals)
Month	Jan	Feb	Mar	Apr	May	Jun	Jul	Aug	Sep	Oct	Nov	Dec	Year
Mean daily maximum °C (°F)	3.8 (38.8)	4.9 (40.8)	9.1 (48.4)	14.6 (58.3)	19.1 (66.4)	22.0 (71.6)	24.5 (76.1)	24.2 (75.6)	19.6 (67.3)	13.9 (57.0)	7.9 (46.2)	4.6 (40.3)	13.9 (57.0)
Daily mean °C (°F)	1.3 (34.3)	1.9 (35.4)	4.7 (40.5)	9.2 (48.6)	13.5 (56.3)	16.4 (61.5)	18.6 (65.5)	18.1 (64.6)	14.2 (57.6)	9.5 (49.1)	5.2 (41.4)	2.3 (36.1)	9.5 (49.1)
Mean daily minimum °C (°F)	−1.2 (29.8)	−1.3 (29.7)	0.9 (33.6)	3.5 (38.3)	7.2 (45.0)	10.2 (50.4)	12.5 (54.5)	12.3 (54.1)	9.1 (48.4)	5.7 (42.3)	2.4 (36.3)	−0.2 (31.6)	5.1 (41.2)
Average precipitation mm (inches)	46.1 (1.81)	31.2 (1.23)	38.0 (1.50)	29.0 (1.14)	50.3 (1.98)	54.0 (2.13)	72.9 (2.87)	60.8 (2.39)	43.6 (1.72)	48.2 (1.90)	40.9 (1.61)	43.7 (1.72)	555.3 (21.86)
Average precipitation days (≥ 1.0 mm)	16.8	14.6	14.5	12.2	13.0	13.3	15.0	14.4	12.8	15.0	16.6	17.1	175.9
Average relative humidity (%)	87.8	84.1	79.4	72.8	71.9	73.1	73.0	74.9	80.1	85.4	89.4	89.1	80.1
Mean monthly sunshine hours	46.9	72.5	125.1	186.8	226.9	225.2	227.8	210.1	159.7	110.4	50.1	38.5	1,661.6
Source: World Meteorological Organization

== Twin towns and sister cities ==
Lüchow is twinned with:

- Céret, France (1983)
- Oborniki, Poland (2007)
- Steglitz-Zehlendorf (Berlin), Germany (2019)

== Sons and daughters of the city ==
- Friedrich Syrup was born in Lüchow.
- Detlef Weigel grew up and attended high school in Lüchow.

== Sources ==
- Johann Parum Schultze; Reinhold Olesch (publisher): Fontes linguae Dravaenopolabicae minores et Chronica Venedica J. P. Schultzii. (= Slavistische Forschungen; Band 7). Böhlau, Köln und Graz 1967
- Christian Hennig von Jessen: Vocabularium Venedicum (oder Wendisches Wörter-Buch) (1705). Nachdruck besorgt von Reinhold Olesch. - Köln [u.a.]: Böhlau 1959 (Pastor C. Hennig von Jessen's source was the Polabian-speaking Johann Janieschge of Klennow)
- Chronik der Stadt Lüchow. Druck- und Verlagsgesellschaft E. Köhring, Lüchow 1949, 2. unveränd. Nachdruck (second unaltered edition) 1989
- Karl Kowalewski: Lüchow. Vom Mittelalter bis zur Gegenwart. Beiträge zur Geschichte der Jeetzel-Stadt. Stade 1980
- Karl Kowalewski: Der große Brand von Lüchow 1811 und der Wiederaufbau der Stadt, Lüchow 2006
- Karl Kowalewski: Von Altertümern und von Heimatliebe. Notizen und Beobachtungen aus Anlaß des Doppeljubiläums; 75 Jahre Wendländischer Altertumsverein 1905–1980; 50 Jahre Wendländisches Heimatmuseum 1930–1980. Lüchow 1980
- Burghard Kulow: Lüchow (Wendland), Die 50er und 60er Jahre. Horb 2006
- Hans Nordsiek: Von Lüchow nach Salzwedel – auf den Spuren des Mindener Reformators Nicolaus Krage. In: Mitteilungen des Mindener Geschichtsvereins, 53/1981, pages 51–106
- Peter und Torsten Schoepe: Lüchow. Wandel des Stadtbildes in 120 Jahren. Lüchow 1985
