= List of Gothic brick buildings in Germany =

This is a list of Gothic brick buildings in Germany.

== Saxony ==
Place	Building	Main period of construction	Special features	Image
Chemnitz	Red Tower		Gothic top storey above natural stone	
Delitzsch	Ss. Peter and Paul Church	1404–1491	hall church	
Dommitzsch	St. Mary's Church	1440–1493 & 1588	Destroyed by fire in 1588, except choir; nave and tower restored with Renaissance alternations	
Eilenburg	St. Nikolai	brick 1444	hall church	
Eilenburg	Defensive walls with 2 towers		Sorbenturm ('Sorbs Tower') and südwestlicher Turm ('southwestern tower')	
Eilenburg	Eilenburg Castle		very much altered, nowadays a prison	
Freiberg	St. Nikolai	1185–1190	upper storeys of the steeples	
Hoyerswerda	St. John's Church	up to 15th century	western gable on roof level	
Löben	Village Church	about 1250	originally a basilica, about 1550 reduced to an aisleless church; only arcades and clerestory of the central nave of brick	
Leisnig	Mildenstein Castle		only upper storeys of the donjon Gothic	
Lunzenau	Rochsburg Castle	since early 13th century	nowadays mainly Renaissance	

== Saxony-Anhalt ==
Place	Building	Main period of construction	Special features	Image
Aken	St. Mary's Church	(1188), 1485	parts of the upper storeys of the towers Gothic and of brick	
Aken	2 towers of former city gates: Burgtorturm; Dessauer Torturm			
Dessau	St. Mary's Church	1523	predecessor 1263, Romanesque; since reconstruction (1989–1998) secular event hall	
Gardelegen	St. Mary's Church	13th century	hall church with 5 naves (two pairs of aisles)	
Gardelegen	St. Nikolai	Gothic changes 13th–15th century	begun about 1200 in Romanesque style already in brick; since WW. II partly ruins	
Gardelegen	Town Hall	13th century & since 1526	only partly visible brick, Gothic Revival alterations	
Gardelegen	Salzwedel Gate			
Gardelegen	Neuendorf Convent	13th to 15th century		
Havelberg	St. Mary's Church	1150–1170 of stone, 1280–1330 mixed	originally a Romanesque basilica of stone with flat ceilings; after destruction by a fire in 1279, the nave was rebuilt in Gothic style in a mixture of brick and stone	
Havelberg	Premonstratensian convent	1150 & 14th century	adjacent to the cathedral	
Havelberg	St. Lawrence	14th century (?)		
Havelberg	St. Anne Chapel	15th century	former hospital chapel	
Kemberg; S of Wittenberg	St. Mary's Church	1290–1346	late Romanesque predecessor; tower 1856–1859	
Magdeburg	St. Peter's Church	entrance 1480	gable, framings and buttresses of the southern entrance hall of the church otherwise built of stone	
Nitzow north of Havelberg	Village Church	about 1400		
Osterburg (Altmark)	St. Nikolai Church	13th century, choir 1484	rebuilt from a Romanesque cross-shaped stone church of the 12th century, lower parts of the nave and lower storeys of the steeple of stone	
Prettin	St. Mary's Church			
Prettin	Lichtenburger Torturm ('Lichtenburg Gate Tower')	14th century		
Salzwedel	St. Catherine's Church	since 1280 – etwa 1500		
Salzwedel	St. Mary's Church	1350–1550	Gothic new building replacing a Romanesque predecessor	
Salzwedel	St. Lorenz Church	mid 13th century	arcades of the aisles and western portal Romanesque	
Salzwedel	Mönchskirche ('Monks' Church')	since 1250	former Franziscan monastery, convengtual buildings preserved	
Salzwedel	Amtsgericht ('District Court house')	since 1509	former town hall	
Salzwedel	Fortifications (Steintor, Neuperver Tor)			
Seehausen	St. Peter's Church	about 1300		
Seehausen	Salzkirche ('Salt Church')	15th century	former church of the Holy Ghost Hospital, later used as a store	
Seehausen	Beustertor ('Beuster Gate')	15th century		
Stendal	St. Nicholas	1423 to mid-15th century	called Dom, former collegiate church, never been a cathedral	
Stendal	Town Hall	Gothic part early 15th century		
Stendal	St. Mary's Church	12th century Romanesque Basilica, late 14th Century western towers, since 1420 Gothic hall church		
Stendal	St. Anne's Church & former refectory	consecrated 1461	former Franciscan nunnery	
Stendal	Municipal Library		former refectory of the Franciscan friars' convent	
Stendal	Former St. Catherine Church & Monastery	1556/1561–1568	former Benedictine nunnery, nowadays Musikforum concert hall & Altmärkisches Museum, Schadewachten 46	
Stendal	Gertrudishospital	founded 1370		
Stendal	Fortifications	brick 15th century	Tangermünder Tor (gate); Uenglinger Tor (gate); Pulverturm (powder tower)	
Tangermünde	Town Hall	about 1430		
Tangermünde	St. Stephen's Church	14th century		
Tangermünde	St. Elizabeth Chapel	15th century	Salzkirche ('Salt Church'), former hospital church, nowadays hall for events	
Tangermünde	Imperial Castle	(925), 1374	under emperor Charles IV extension of an older fortress into a Gothic representative castle, mainly of brick; most of it today in ruins	
Tangermünde	Defensive walls	14th–15th century	Neustädter Tor; Elbtor; Eulenturm; Schrotturm	
Werben	St. John's Church	hall church, 15th century		
Werben	Salzkirche ('Salt Church)'	15th century	former chapel of the Holy Ghost Hospital	
Werben	Elbtor ('Elbe Gate')	about 1470	part of the town fortifications	
Wolmirstedt	Wolmirstedt Castle	1480	chapel and parts of the Unterburg ('Lower Castle')	
Zahna	St. Mary's Church	tower 12th century	upper storeys of the steeple of an otherwise Romanesque church, mostly built of stone	

== Brandenburg and Berlin ==
Place	Building	Main period of construction	Special features	Image
Abbendorf, Rühstädt (Prignitz)	Village Church	early 16th century	Baroque relaunch 1662	
Alt Ruppin, Neuruppin	St. Nikolai Church	eastern nave 1st half of 14th, western nave & tower rebuilt in 1598–1603, porch Baroque, sacristy G. Revival		
Angermünde	St. Mary's Church	brick 15th & 16th century	13th century boulders	
Angermünde	Church of St. Peter and St. Paul	brick since 1300	13th century aisleless building of granite cubes	
Angermünde	Holy Ghost Chapel	14th – 15th century	part of a hospital that was destroyed in the Thirty Years War	
Angermünde	Defensive city wall with powder tower	late 13th century	lower sections partly of boulders	
Angermünde	City Castle		ruin	
Angermünde	Greiffenberg Castle	since 1224	ruin	
Alt Krüssow, Pritzwalk	Pilgrimage Church	1501–1520	western bay & tower 1879/1890; former pilgrimage church	
Bardenitz, Treuenbrietzen	Village Church	13th/15th century		
Baruth/Mark	Parish Church of St. Sebastian	15th – 16th century	late Gothic hall church, lower parts of stone	
Beelitz	St. Mary and St. Nikolai Church	1247, brick 1511	basilica converted into a Gothic hall church	
Beeskow	St. Mary's Church	15th century	hall church; predecessor 14th century	
Beeskow	Defensive towers		Mäuseturm; Münzturm; Storchenturm	
Beeskow	Beeskow Castle	since 1272	lower parts mostly of boulders, upper mostly of brick	
Bad Belzig	Eisenhardt Castle	Backstein 14th and 15th century		
Berlin	St. Mary's Church			
Berlin	St. Nicholas Church			
Berlin	Graues Kloster ('Grey Abbey')	End of 13th century	former Franciscan abbey; ruins since World War II	
Berlin-Spandau	St. Nikolai Church	since about 1370	halle church	
Berlitt, Kyritz	Village Church	1526	brick gable and other brick decorations on a structure of boulders	
Bernau bei Berlin	St. Mary's Church	1400–1519	predecessors since 1240; tower 19th century	
Bernau bei Berlin	Chapel of the St. Georg Hospital	1328, brick, mid 15th century	former hospital church, later French Calvinist church	
Bernau bei Berlin	Steintor ('Stone Gate')	15th century		
Boitzenburger Land municipality (Uckermark)	Ruins of Boitzenburg Monastery	after 1280	Cistercian nunnery, destroyed in Thirty Years War	
Brandenburg (originally three municipalities, the cities: Brandenburg Altstadt; Brandenburg Neustadt; and the village Dom-Brandenburg; the cities united in 1715, Dom Brandenburg incorporated in 1929)	St. Peter and Paul Cathedral	Mainly 1165–1240	including the foundations erected by brick, first brick church in the Margraviate of Brandenburg	
Brandenburg (originally three municipalities, the cities: Brandenburg Altstadt; Brandenburg Neustadt; and the village Dom-Brandenburg; the cities united in 1715, Dom Brandenburg incorporated in 1929)	St. Peter's Chapel	1314–1320	until 1237 chapel of the margravian castle, since 1320 parish for the laic inhabitants of the Cathedral Island	
Brandenburg (originally three municipalities, the cities: Brandenburg Altstadt; Brandenburg Neustadt; and the village Dom-Brandenburg; the cities united in 1715, Dom Brandenburg incorporated in 1929)	Domklausur		eastern part pure Gothic, northern part since 1707 modest Baroque, western part since 1870 Gothic Revival	
Brandenburg (originally three municipalities, the cities: Brandenburg Altstadt; Brandenburg Neustadt; and the village Dom-Brandenburg; the cities united in 1715, Dom Brandenburg incorporated in 1929)	Curia (Capitular's house) V		decorated western gable of unpainted brick, other curias nowadays in modest baroque	
Brandenburg (originally three municipalities, the cities: Brandenburg Altstadt; Brandenburg Neustadt; and the village Dom-Brandenburg; the cities united in 1715, Dom Brandenburg incorporated in 1929)	St. Catherine's Church	after 1401	two phases of construction, parish of Neustadt	
Brandenburg (originally three municipalities, the cities: Brandenburg Altstadt; Brandenburg Neustadt; and the village Dom-Brandenburg; the cities united in 1715, Dom Brandenburg incorporated in 1929)	St. Paul Convent	1286–end of 14th century	Neustadt	
Brandenburg (originally three municipalities, the cities: Brandenburg Altstadt; Brandenburg Neustadt; and the village Dom-Brandenburg; the cities united in 1715, Dom Brandenburg incorporated in 1929)	Old Town Hall	mainly 1450–1468		
Brandenburg (originally three municipalities, the cities: Brandenburg Altstadt; Brandenburg Neustadt; and the village Dom-Brandenburg; the cities united in 1715, Dom Brandenburg incorporated in 1929)	Ordonnance House	mainly 1300–1310	probably oldest secular hardwall building in Brandenburg Margraviate	
Brandenburg (originally three municipalities, the cities: Brandenburg Altstadt; Brandenburg Neustadt; and the village Dom-Brandenburg; the cities united in 1715, Dom Brandenburg incorporated in 1929)	Gothic House	1452		
Brandenburg (originally three municipalities, the cities: Brandenburg Altstadt; Brandenburg Neustadt; and the village Dom-Brandenburg; the cities united in 1715, Dom Brandenburg incorporated in 1929)	St. Godard	mainly 1450–1468	Romanesque western portal, tower Baroque	
Brandenburg (originally three municipalities, the cities: Brandenburg Altstadt; Brandenburg Neustadt; and the village Dom-Brandenburg; the cities united in 1715, Dom Brandenburg incorporated in 1929)	St. John's Church		Altstadt, Franciscans	
Brandenburg (originally three municipalities, the cities: Brandenburg Altstadt; Brandenburg Neustadt; and the village Dom-Brandenburg; the cities united in 1715, Dom Brandenburg incorporated in 1929)	Two separate defensive wall rings (Altstadt & Neustadt), 4 surviving gate towers		Plauer Turm; Rathenower Turm; Mühlentorturm; Steintorturm	
Buckow, Nennhausen; N of Brandenburg city	Village Church	1344 & 1473	former pilgrimage, relics of 14th century chapel in the choir of → 15th century church, retrospective style, following St. Peter's near Brandenburg cathedral	
Burxdorf, Bad Liebenwerda (Elbe-Elster district)	Village Church	1st half of 13 century		
Calau	City Church	about 1400		
Chorin	Chorin Abbey		former Cistercian monastery	
Cottbus; Lower Lusatia	Upper Church St. Nikolai	15th – 16th century		
Cottbus; Lower Lusatia	Monastery Church		former Franciscan church; tower in the east	
Doberlug-Kirchhain	Dobrilugk Abbey		former Cistercian monastery	
Eberswalde near Oder river	Church of St. Mary Magdalene	1303, 1503	various Gothic Revival alterations in 1876	
Fergitz on Oberuckersee, Uckermark	Village Church	bt. 13th & 15th century	brick on a base of boulders, decorated eastern gable	
Frankfurt (Oder)	St. Mary's Church	1253–1367, additions in 15th century		
Frankfurt (Oder)	Town Hall	begun 1253, altered in 14th century		
Frankfurt (Oder)	Franciscan Abbey church	nave 1515–1525	very late Gothic; today Concert Hall Carl Philipp Emanuel Bach Frankfurt (Oder)	
Bad Freienwalde	St. Nikolai Church	15th century	spire 19th century	
Friedersdorf, Sonnewalde (Elbe-Elster)	Village Church	15th century, brick 16th century		
Fürstenwalde/Spree	St. Mary's Cathedral	1446	long-time cathedral of the diocese of Lebus; almost completely destroyed in WW II, reconstruction finished in 1995	
Gartz (Oder)	St. Stephen's Church	13th/14th century	since destruction by a fire in 1945, nave is an open ruin, vaults lost	
Gartz (Oder)	former chapel of the Holy Ghost Hospital	about 1400	in 19th century used for residential purpose, today hall for events	
Gartz (Oder)	Towers of the defensive wall	Stettiner Tor ('Szczecin Gate'); Blauer Hut ('Blue Hat'); Pulverturm ('Powder Tower'); Storchenturm ('Stork Tower')		
Goßmar, Heideblick, Dahme-Spreewald district	Village Church	brick 2nd half of 15th century	many parts plastered, core early 14th century of boulders, only upper parts of the choir of brick	
Goßmar, Sonnewalde, Sonnewalde, Elbe-Elster	Village Church	core 1st half of 14th century, brick later	church of boulders with Gothic choir windows of brick	
Gottberg, Märkisch Linden	Village Church	2nd half of 13th century	building of boulders with windows, edges and structured gables of brick; 1902 choir added and new windows of the nave	
Gransee	St. Mary's Church	14th–16th century	with older parts of the predecessor of boulders	
Heiligengrabe, Ostprignitz-Ruppin district	Abbey Heiligengrabe	about 1300–1520	convent buildings enlarged 1510–1520, Cistercian nunnery, 1549 continued as a Lutheran convent until 1945, and refounded in 1996	
Heiligengrabe, Ostprignitz-Ruppin district	Blood Chapel	1512	separately west of the main compound	
Herzberg (Elster)	St. Mary's Church	about 1350	hall church	
Himmelpfort, Fürstenberg/Havel	Abbey Himmelpfort	since 1308	decay 18th–21st century (2010 fire of the brewery)	
Hohengüstow, Uckerfelde, Uckermark	Village Church	13th century	windows enlarged downward in 19th century	
Holzhausen, Kyritz, Ostprignitz-Ruppin	Village Church	about 1300	windows & blind arcades of brick on the Easter gable	
Hornow, Spremberg, Lower Lusatia	St. Martin Church	13th century	decorative gable of brick, church otherwise built of boulders; tower 1901/1902	
Jüterbog; N of Wittenberg	Town Hall			
Jüterbog; N of Wittenberg	Mönchenkirche ('Monks' Church')			
Jüterbog; N of Wittenberg	Our Lady's Church	1174/1183, choir 1480	choir of a generally Romanesque brick church	
Jüterbog-Zinna	Zinna Abbey	Mainly from 1220	former Cistercian monastery	
Kremmen; NW of Berlin	St. Nikolai Church	13th and 15th century	brick Late Gothic, stepped halle	
Flatow, Kremmen	Village Church	1472	later additions, steeple altered in Gothic Revival style	
Ketzür, Beetzseeheide, NE of Brandenburg city	Village Church	2nd half of 13th century	central scheme, octagon, tower 15th century	
Kleinmachnow, S of Berlin	Village Church	1568–1600	very late Gothic, patronate of Hake family	
Kränzlin, Märkisch Linden	Village Church	late 13th century	building of boulders with windows and structured gable of brick; 1895/1896 Gothic revival tower; in ruins since 1970, provisionally stabilized 1998	
Lehnin, SE of Brandenburg city	Lehnin Abbey	since end of 12th century, consecrated 1262 or 1270		
Lenzen (Elbe) (Prignitz)	St. Catherine's Church	14th century		
Lenzen (Elbe) (Prignitz)	Stumpfer Turm ('Blunt Tower')		part of the former city gate Bergtor	
Leuthen, Drebkau; SW of Cottbus	Village Church	1st half, tower 2nd half of 13th century	two representative stepped gables; tower replaced by Gothic Revival in 1854	
Bad Liebenwerda	Parish Church of St. Nikolai	14th and 16th centuries	simplified reconstraction before 1655	
Lieberose	City Church	15th/16th century	since 1945 in ruins	
Lübben (Spreewald)	Paul Gerhard Church	1494–1550	latest Gothic; tower mid 15th century, nowadays plastered; originally St. Nicholas	
Steinkirchen, Lübben (Spreewald)	St. Pankrace Church	1st & 2nd half of 13th century	Romanesque brick church extended by a choir of granite with brick-framed windows	
Luckau	St. Nikolai Church	14th century		
Luckau	Hausmannsturm ('Stewards Tower') next to the Georg Chapel		octagonal Gothic tower with a Baroque top above square Romanesque basic section	
Luckau	Red Tower	13th/14, century	part of the lost Calauer Gate	
Luckenwalde	St. John's Church	(about 1200), Gothic 2nd half of 15th century	hall church with two naves, lower walls partly of boulders; separate belfry, originally urban market tower, only bell storey Brick Gothic	
Marienfließ (Prignitz)	Marienfließ Monastery	14th century	Cistercian monastery church	
Mittenwalde	St. Maurice Church	14th–15th century	with remains of stone walls of a predecessor; steeple in Gothic Revival style 1877/78	
Mittenwalde	Spitalkapelle (Hospital Chapel)	1394		
Mittenwalde	Berliner Tor ('Berlin Gate')		upper section of the powder tower (lower walls of boulders) and arch (semi-ruin)	
Mödlich, Lenzerwische; Elbe river	Village Church	1468–1500		
Mühlberg	Marienstern Abbey	since 1228	church and refectory Early Gothic brick buildings	
Müncheberg	Parish Church of St. Mary	15th century, predecessor 13th century	hall church with two naves, base partly of boulders, neoclassicist tower	
Müncheberg	Berliner Tor ('Berlin Gate')		lower storeys partly of boulders	
Bad Muskau	Bergsche Kirche ('Church of Berg')	13th century	ruins; door and window framings of brick	
Nauen	St. James' Church	1st third of the 14th century	hall church	
Nitzow north of Havelberg	Village Church	about 1400		
Neuruppin	Trinity Church	1st half 13th century	hall church, towers Gothic Revival style	
Pechüle, Bardenitz, Treuenbrietzen	Village Church	1st third 13th century	Romanesque apsis and Early Gothic nave built of brick, younger tower mainly from boulders	
Perleberg, Prignitz	St. James' Church	1280/90–1361, tower 15th century	hall church	
Plaue (incorporated by Brandenburg city)	Village Church	13th & 16th centuries	primarily Romanesque, then extended to a Late Gothic hall with two naves, further additions im 18th century	
Prenzlau	St. Mary's Church			
Pritzwalk	St. Nikolai Church	since 1256, modernizations since 1501	some walls of boulders; steeple in Gothic Revival style	
Rathenow	Church of St. Mary and St. Andrew	14th & 16th century	first parts 13th century, tower 19th century	
Rottstock (to Brück)	Village Church	15th century	mainly boulders, only eastern gable of the nave (above the choir) of brick	
Sachsendorf, Lindendorf, Oderbruch	Village Church	1514–1519	tower after WW II restored without uppermost storey	
Selbelang, Paulinenaue, Havelland	St. Nikolai Church	2nd half of 15th century	tower 1597, windows enlarged in 1862	
Senftenberg	Ss. Peter and Paul Church	end 14th to early 15 th century	only szteeple of brick	
Templin	St. Georg Chapel, of the St. Georg Hospital	late 14th century	former hospital church	
Templin	Berliner Tor; Prenzlauer Tor; Mühlentor; Pulverturm	14th century	remaining completely preserved town wall made of fieldstone	
Teupitz	Church of the Holy Spirit	1346	aisleless church with a flat ceiling, gables of the tower and other parts altered in the 19th century	
Tremmen, Ketzin	Village Church	15th century	originally pilgrimage; 1724 Baroque upper sections and roofs of the steeples	
Treuenbrietzen	St. Mary's Church	1220–early 16th century	begun as a Romanesque basilica of boulders, clerestory of brick, Brick Gothic vaults and steeple	
Treuenbrietzen	St. Nikolai Church		Romanesque-Gothic intermediate style	
Werben/Wjerbno (Spree-Neiße)	Village Church	1st half of 15th century	after damage in WW II. simplified reconstruction	
Bad Wilsnack	Church of the Holy Blood		major place of pilgrimages in Northern Germany until the 16th century	
Wittstock/Dosse	St. Mary's Church	13th to 15th century		
Wittstock/Dosse	Bishop's Castle	since 1244	the donjon, one gate and parts of the circular wall have been preserved	
Wittstock/Dosse	Gröpertor ('Gröper Gate')	14th century, enlarged in 1530	last surviving gate of originally three gates of an almost complete circular town wall	
Wittstock/Dosse	Daberburg Castle	betw. 1438 & 1475	altering restoration of the donjon, rest lost	
Wittstock/Dosse	Village Church Wulfersdorf	16th century	stepped eastern gable some frames of a church mainly built of boulders; Renaissance tower	
Wriezen	St. Mary's Church	15th century	since 1945 ruins; predescendant from the 13th century	
Wusterhausen/Dosse	Ss. Peter and Paul Church	13th/15th century	choir of brick, nave and steeple mixed with an exceptional combination in the walls of the steeple	
Zachow, Ketzin/Havel	Village Church	15th century	except of the eastern gable altered to simple Baroque in early 18th century	
Ziesar	Ziesar Castle	brick since 1213	chapel (1470); courtside and upper walls of other buildings; Storchenturm ('Stork Tower')	

== Mecklenburg-Vorpommern ==
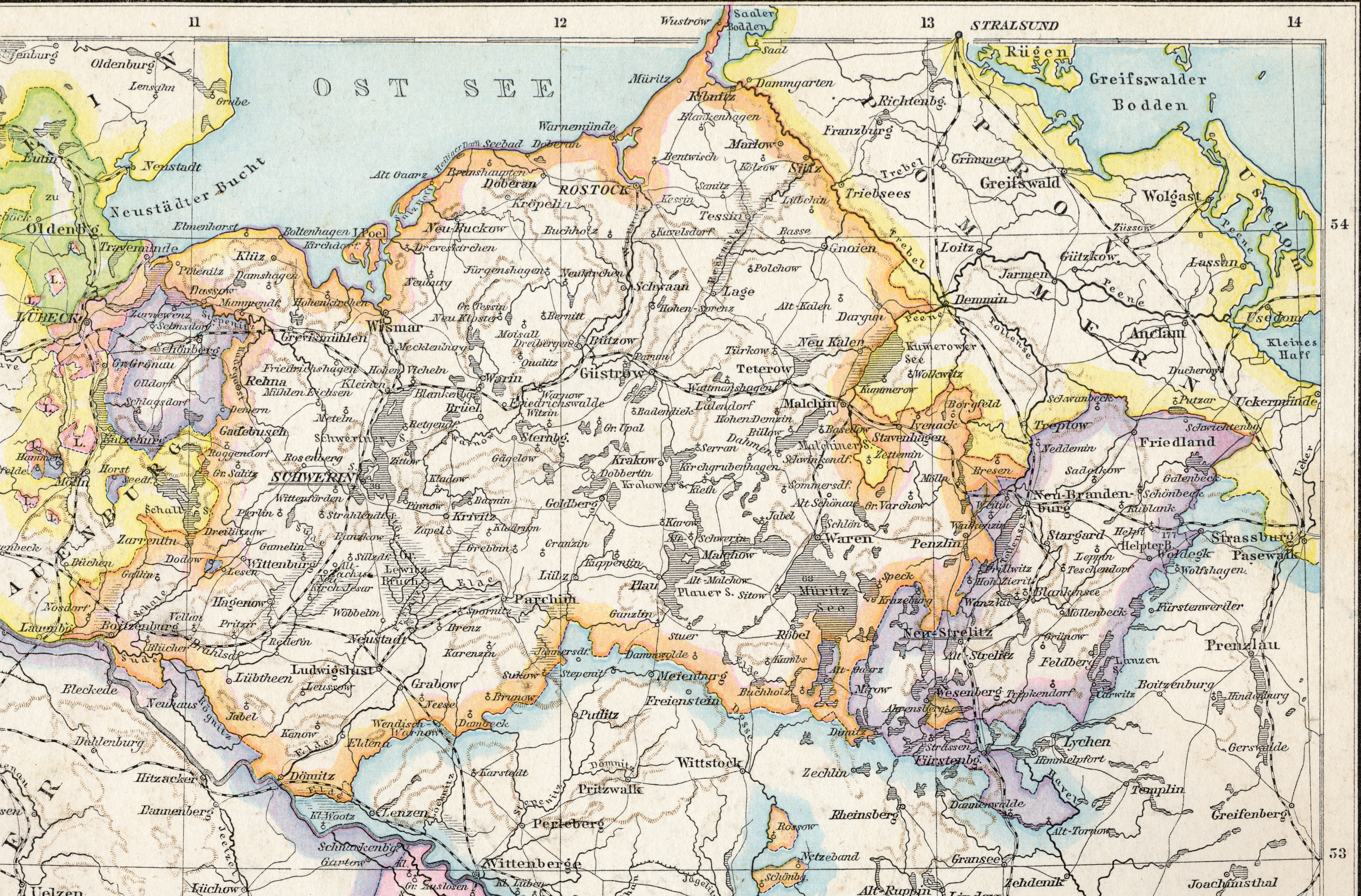
Mecklenburg in 1880

–Database links:

- D-NO = Dehio List of Monuments 1906 – Northeast of that time German Empire (in German), digital Library of Heidelberg University–

The distinction between Mecklenburg and Vorpommern (Hither Pomerania) follows the historical borders, the borders of presentday districts do not. Therefore, the list of Mecklenburg shows some buildings in Vorpommern-Rügen district, and the list of Hither Pomerania without Rügen shows some buildings in Mecklenburgische Seenplatte district.

=== Mecklenburg ===
Place	Building	Time of construction	Notes	Image
Alt Bukow, Rostock district	Village Church	15th century	including relics of an older church of boulders	
Altkalen (Rostock district)	Village Church	2nd half of 13th century		
Alt Karin, Carinerland (Rostock district)	Village Church	13th/14th century		
Alt Meteln (Nordwestmecklenburg)	Village Church	2nd half of 13th century		
Alt Panstorf, Malchin (Meck. Lakes distr.)	Church ruin	14th century	decay since end 19th century	
Alt Schönau, Peenehagen (Meck. Lakes distr.)	Village Church	14th century	building of boulders with windows & decorated gable triangle of brick	
Bäbelin, Züsow (Nordwestmecklenburg)	Village Church	15th century	tower inclusive its base 1872	
Bargensdorf, Burg Stargard (Meck. Lakes distr.)	Village Church		western gable triangle (partly hidden by the wooden tower) decorated of brick, windows enlarged in end 18th century	
Basedow, south of Malchin (Meck. Lakes distr.)	Village Church	brick 15th century	13th century boulders	
Basse, Lühburg, Walkendorf (Rostock district)	Village Church	13th/14th century		
Beidendorf, Bobitz (Nordwestmecklenburg)	Village Church	13th or early 14th century		
Belitz, Prebberede (Rostock district)	Village Church	nave since 1270, tower 15th century		
Below, Techentin (Ludwigslust-Parchim)	Village Church	1483	mainly of boulders; buttresses and poor window framings of brick	
Bentwisch (Rostock district)	Village Church	13th–early 14th century	base of boulders; aisleless	
Berendshagen, Satow, SW of Rostock	Village Church	15th century ?		
Bernitt (Rostock district)	Village Church	13th century, tower 15th century	only gable triangles and windows & gates of brick	
Bibow (Nordwestmecklenburg)	Village Church	1st half of 14th century		
Boddin (Rostock district)	St. Nikolai Church	1288	Gothic Revival alterations	
Börzow, Stepenitztal (Nordwestmecklenburg)	Village Church	mid 15th century	southern chapel added in 1738, northern about 1900	
Bössow; Warnow municipality, near Grevesmühlen	Village Church	about 1310		
Brüel (Ludwigslust-Parchim district)	City Church	13th century	aisleless	
Bülow, Schorssow (Rostock district)	Village Church	nave 13th, tower 15th century		
Bützow	Collegiate Church	mid 13th to 2nd half of 14th century	hall church	
Cammin, Burg Stargard (Meck. Lakes distr.)	Village Church		Early Gothic building of boulders with few Romanesque elements and some decoration of brick	
Chemnitz, Blankenhof (Meck. Lakes distr.)	Village Church	about 1305	building of boulders, windows (probably renewed) and (eastern) gable decoration of brick, western gabel new of brick	
Cramon, Cramonshagen (Nordwestmecklenburg)	Village Church	14th century	separate tower 1844	
Crivitz	City Church	end of 14th century		
Dambeck, Bobitz (Nordwestmecklenburg)	Village Church	14th century		
Damm, Parchim	Village Church	late 15th century		
Damshagen (Klützer Winkel) (Nordwestmecklenburg)	St. Thomas Church	early 14th century	reconstruction & tower about 1730	
Dassow (Nordwestmecklenburg)	St. Nikolai Church	13th century	flat ceiling since 1632, only choir and tower of brick	
Dargun (Meck. Lakes distr.)	Dargun Abbey	1225–1270		
Demen, near Crivitz (Ludwigslust-Parchim)	Village Church	late 13th & mid 14th century		
Deven, Groß Plasten (Meck. Lakes distr.)	Village Church	14th/15th century	decorated gable triangles, edges and windows of brick	
Diedrichshagen, Rüting (Nordwestmecklenburg)	Village Church			
Dobbertin Abbey		founded about 1220	church massively altered in Gothic Revival style, convent buildings partly plastered and partly half timbered	
Bad Doberan	Doberan Minster	1291–1368	former Cistercian monastic church; basilica	
Bad Doberan	Althof Chapel	14th century	western façade Gothic Revival	
Dorf Mecklenburg (Nordwestmecklenburg)	Village Church	14th century	originally neighbour of the ducal castle; temporarily altered in Baroque style, re-gothisized in 19th century	
Dreveskirchen, Blowatz (Nordwestmecklenburg)	Village Church	2nd half of 13th century		
Elmenhorst, Kalkhorst (Nordwestmecklenburg)	Village Church	13th century		
Friedland	St. Mary's Church		Hall church	
Friedland	St. Nikolai Church		ruins since WW.II	
Friedland	Wiekhaus Fischerburg ('guard house Fisherman's Castle')			
Friedland	Anklamer Tor ('Anklam Gate')			
Friedland	Neubrandenburger Tor ('Neubrandenburg Gate')			
Friedrichshagen, Upahl (Nordwestmecklenburg)	Village Church	(14th or) 15th century		
Gadebusch	City Church	1210 – early 15th century	started in late Romanesque style, one of the earliest hall churches in northern Germany	
Gadebusch	Town Hall	1340, altered in 1618	outside mainly Renaissance and early Baroque	
Gägelow, Sternberg (Ludwigslust-Parchim)	Village Church	1260–1270	vaulted	
Gammelin near Ludwigslust	Village Church	about 1335		
Garwitz, Lewitzrand (Ludwigslust-Parchim)	Village Church	15th century	brick with some boulders	
Gnoien (Rostock district)	St. Mary's Church	13th century 1445		
Goldberg (Ludwigslust-Parchim)	City Church	1290	restored (nave rebuilt) after fire by a lightning in 1643	
Goldebee, Benz (Nordwestmecklenburg)	Village Church	15th century	tower rebuilt in modern style in the 20th century	
Grabow on Elde river	St. George's Church	late 13th/14th century	hall church, damage fire in 1715; tower base 15th century of stone, top of brick 1906–1910	
Gressow, Gägelow west of Wismar	Village Church	14th century		
Grevesmühlen	St. Nikolai Church	13th century	Romanesque-Gothic intermediate style	
Groß Brütz, Brüsewitz; NW near Schwerin	Village Church	consecrated 1456		
Groß Eichsen, Mühlen Eichsen; NW of Schwerin	Village Church	1st half of 14th century	founded by the Order of St John	
Groß Gievitz, Peenehagen (Meck. Lakes distr.)	Village Church		decorated gable triangle, gate and (partly renewed) windows of brick; pointed arch vaults without ribs	
Groß Lukow, Penzlin (Meck. Lakes distr.)	Village Church	tower 14th or 15th century	nave 1866	
Groß Salitz, Krembz (Nordwestmecklenburg)	St. Mary's Church	about 1280	basilica	
Groß Trebbow, Klein Trebbow, north of Schwerin	Village Church	roof 1402		
Groß Tessin, Glasin; NE of Neukloster	Village Church	nave 1298–1345	tower 1741	
Groß Varchow, Möllenhagen; NE of lake Müritz	Village Church	since 1276 ?	lower wall sections partly of boulders	
Güstrow	Güstrow Dom (actually not a Dom (cathedral) but a collegiate church)	early 13th to late 15th century	hall church	
Güstrow	St. Mary's Church		hall church	
Hanstorf, Satow	Village Church	13th/14th century	started of boulders, completed of brick	
Herrnburg, Lüdersdorf	Village Church	13th, 15th, 16th century		
Hohen Luckow, Satow	Village Church	14th century	restored after fire in 1934	
Hohenkirchen coast of Lübeck Bay	Village Church	mid 15th century	aisleless, vaulted	
Hohen Mistorf, Alt Sührkow (Rostock district)	Village Church	choir since 1280, nave 14th, tower 15th century		
Hohen Sprenz (Rostock district)	Village Church	1261–1458	partly boulders with brick decoration, partly brick	
Hohen Viecheln northern end of Lake Schwerin	Village Church	1310–1320	hall church	
Holzendorf, Groß Miltzow (Meck. Lakes distr.)	Village Church	15th century		
Holzendorf, Kuhlen-Wendorf (Ludwigslust-Parchim)	Village Church	end 15th century	choir and windows Gothic Revival	
Hornstorf (Nordwestmecklenburg)	Village Church	14th/15th century		
Jabel; W of Waren (Müritz) (Meck. Lakes distr.)	Village Church	14th century & 1868	except of sacristy and lower part of the tower Gothic Revival	
Kalkhorst; Klützer Winkel (Nordwestmecklenburg)	Village Church	13th/14th century		
Kambs, Vorbeck (Rostock district)	Village Church	choir 1289, porch about 1500	northern side of the choir of boulders; nave Gothic Revival	
Karow, Plau am See (Ludwigslust-Parchim)	Village Church	late 15th century	eastern part of brick, western part mainly of boulders, transept and all gables Gothic Revival	
Kessin, Dummerstorf (Rostock district)	St. Godehard Church	choir 1269, nave about 1360	choir boulders with brick decoration, nave all of brick	
Kirch Grambow, Wedendorfersee (Nordwestmecklenburg)	Village Church	13th century	at least windows of the nave later altered	
Kirch Kogel, Reimershagen (Rostock district)	Village Church	13th & early 14th century		
Kirch Mulsow (Rostock district)	Village Church	14th century	tower 18th century	
Kirch Mummendorf, Stepenitztal (Nordwestmecklenburg)	Village Church	2nd half of 13th century		
Kirch Stück, Klein Trebbow (Nordwestmecklenburg)	Village Church	about 1280		
Klinken, Lewitzrand (Ludwigslust-Parchim)	Village Church	choir 1300, aisles end 14th century	asymmetrical stepped hall church (southern aisle demolished in 1804)	
Kloster Tempzin near Brüel (Ludwigslust-Parchim)	Monastery Tempzin	church early 15th century, warm house 1496	Hospital Brothers of St. Anthony	
Klütz	St. Mary's Church	since 12th century	choir (also brick) Romanesque, nave and steeple Gothic	
Kraak, Rastow near Ludwigslust	Village Church	14th / early 15th century		
Krakow am See (Rostock district)	City Church	1250	reconstruction after fire about 1700	
Kröpelin	City Church	13th/14th century	aisleless	
Kröslin; Vorpommern-Greifswald	Village Church	13th century		
Kühlungsborn (Rostock district)	St. John's Church	13th century	boulders with few decorations of brick	
Kuppentin, Gallin-Kuppentin (Ludwigslust-Parchim)	Village Church	choir of brick 1284, nave of boulders & few brick 1337, wooden tower 1556		
Laage	City Church	13th–15th century	hall church, lower sections partly of boulders	
Lambrechtshagen (Rostock district)	Village Church	14th century	choir boulders with brick, nave mainly, tower all brick	
Lancken, Rom (Ludwigslust-Parchim)	Village Church	14th/15th century	windows gate and decorated western gable tringe of brick, else mixture of boulders & brick	
Levitzow, Sukow-Levitzow (Rostock district)	Village Church	end 13th century	Late Gothic eastern gable triangle, Renaissance additions	
Lichtenhagen, Elmenhorst/Lichtenhagen (Rostock district)	Village Church	late 13th & 14th century	hall church	
Lübsee, Menzendorf (Nordwestmecklenburg)	Village Church	1236–1263	Tower Gothic Revival	
Lübz	City Church	about 1570	outside Late Gothic, inside Renaissance, aisleless with wooden barrel vaults	
Ludorf, Südmüritz (Meck. Lakes distr.)	Village Church	13th/14th century	octagonal footplan	
Lüdershagen, Hoppenrade (Rostock district)	Village Church	13th century	Romaesque & Gothic; boulders & some brick	
Lüssow near Güstrow (Rostock district)	Village Church	13th century	boulders & some brick; upper tower 15th century, all brick	
Malchin	St. John's Church	from 1397	Basilica	
Malchin	Kalensches Tor ('Kalen Gate')	15th century		
Malchin	Steintor ('Stone Gate')	15th century	1893/94 demolished and restored	
Malchin	Fangelturm (tower)	15th century, attic 16th century	part of the fortifications, later used as a prison	
Marlow	City Church	13th & 15th century	nave mainly Romanesque, tower Gothic	
Mestlin	Village Church	about 1250 and about 1370	choir Romanesque of boulders, nave Gothic hall	
Mollenstorf, Penzlin (Meck. Lakes distr.)	Village Church	14th century	brick with some boulders	
Mühlen Eichsen on Stepenitz river (Nordwestmecklenburg)	Village Church	14th century		
Müsselmow, Kuhlen-Wendorf (Ludwigslust-Parchim)	Village Church	restored in 1502	modest brick walls, no buttresses	
Nätebow, Bollewick near Röbel (Müritz) (Meck. Lakes distr.)	Village Church	early 14th century	tower Gothic Revival	
Neubrandenburg	Marienkirche (St. Mary's Church)	2nd half 13th century		
Neubrandenburg	St. John's Church	1st half 14th century	hall church, former Franciscan friary	
Neubrandenburg	Town fortifications, e.g. Stargarder Tor, Treptower Tor, Neues Tor ('Stargard Gate', 'Treptow Gate', 'New Gate')	after 1300 until early 15th century		
Neubukow (Rostock district)	City Church	13th century	Early Gothic	
Neuburg (Nordwestmecklenburg)	Village Church	1200–1244	very early Gothic, begun in Romanesque style (closed round low arcades below the windows)	
Neukloster (Nordwestmecklenburg)	Monastery Church Neukloster	begun 1219, slow progress	Romanesque & Gothic; Evangelical former abbey church	
Neustadt-Glewe	Alte Burg ('Old Castle')	13th–17th century		
Neustadt-Glewe	St. Mary's Church	14th/18th century	simplified reconstruction after a great fire of 1728	
Parchim	St. George's Church	since 1289	hall church	
Parchim	St. Mary's Church	14th century	hall church	
Parchim	St. Bartholomew's Chapel	about 1350	several alterations, now a private home	
Parkentin, Bartenshagen-Parkentin (Rostock district)	Village Church	13th & 14th century	boulders & brick	
Parum, Dümmer (Ludwigslust-Parchim)	Village Church	15th & 19th centuries	wooden tower, only (western) nave medieval, windows, transept and choir Gothic Revival	
Passee; NE of Neukloster (Nordwestmecklenburg)	Village Church	early 14th century	rib vaults	
Penzlin (Meck. Lakes distr.)	St. Mary's Church	14th century	hall church	
Penzlin (Meck. Lakes distr.)	Alte Burg ('Old Castle')	begun before 14th century	reconstruction after centuries of decay, only ground flour & basement walls medieval	
Perlin (Nordwestmecklenburg)	Village Church	13th century	structured brick gable and edges of brick on a building of boulders	
Petersdorf, Woldegk (Meck. Lakes distr.)	Village Church	15th century	building of boulders with various decorations of brick, tower Gothic Revival	
Petschow, Lieblingshof, Dummerstorf (Rostock district)	Village Church	13th century	boulders & few brick, early Gothic	
Pinnow, near Schwerin	Village Church	14th century	tower and base of the walls of boulders	
Plau am See (Ludwigslust-Parchim)	St. Mary's Church	13th & 14th century	nave Romanesque & Gothic hall church, choir Gothic Revival	
Kirchdorf, Poel (Poel Island)	Village Church	tower 13th century, nave 14th century	aisleless, vaults	
Pokrent (Lützow-Lübstorf) (Nordwestmecklenburg)	Village Church	late 16th century		
Prestin, Bülow east of Crivitz (Ludwigslust-Parchim)	Village Church	14th–15th centuries	building of boulders with a little medieval brick and restoration by brick and framework in 1704	
Proseken, Gägelow near Wismar	Village Church	2nd half of 13th century	tower 15 th century	
Rehna	Monastery Rehna	13th century & 2nd fourth 15th century	Late Gothic adaption of the originally Late Romanesque church	
Rerik	St. John's Church	after 1250	hall church	
Retgendorf, Dobin am See; NE of Lake Schwerin	Village Church	1st half of 14th century		
Rethwisch, Börgerende-Rethwisch (Rostock district)	Village Church	early 14th century	brick & some boulders	
Rittermannshagen, Faulenrost (Meck. Lakes distr.)	Village Church	choir 1300	stepped western gable Gothic revival	
Ritzerow near Stavenhagen (Meck. Lakes distr.)	Village Church	eastern parts 15th century	eastern parts brick & boulders, western parts and decorations of the eastern parts Gothic Revival	
Röbel southwest coast of lake Müritz	St. Nikolai Church	13th century – about 1500	hall church	
Roggendorf; Nordwestmecklenburg near Ratzeburg	Village Church	early 15th century	built of fieldstone with structured brick gables, gothic buttresses and a small brick extension	
Roggenstorf near Grevesmühlen (Nordwestmecklenburg)	Village Church	about 1325		
Rostock	St. Mary's Church	after 1290 & after 1398	two phases of construction, basilica, footplan of a Greek cross	
Rostock	St. Nikolai Church	present form after 1400		
Rostock	St. Peter's Church	about 1325 – early 15th century		
Rostock	Town Hall	core about 1230, Gothic façade after 1300	since 1729 largely hidden by Baroque structure	
Rostock	Abbey of the Holy Cross	1st half 14th century	former Cistercian nunnery	
Rostock	House in the Kröpeliner Straße	Late 15th century	former parsonage, now library Stadtbibliothek Rostock	
Rostock	Kerkhoff House	3rd quarter 15th century	originally a citizen's house, now municipal office	
Rostock	Kröpeliner Tor ('Kröpelin Gate')	13th to 16th century		
Rostock	Kuhtor ('Cow Gate')	13th century		
Ruchow, Mustin (Ludwigslust-Parchim)	Village Church	13th–15th centuries	building of boulders with windows, gate and decorated gable triangles of brick	
Russow, Rerik (Rostock district)	Village Church	about 1300	integrated tower Gothic revival	
Satow (Rostock district)	Church ruin	13th century	given up for decay	
Schönberg	St. Lawrence's Church	existent before 1235, enlarged after 1324	since restoration after fire in 1601 a pseudo-basilica with flat ceilings	
Schorrentin, Neukalen (Meck. Lakes distr.)	Village Church	about 1300	tower 1767	
Schwaan	St. Paul's Church	1st half 13th century u. 15th century	nave mainly Romanesque, aisleless; steeple Gothic, 1840 Neoclassic alterations	
Schwerin	Cathedral	c. 1280 – c. 1420	Basilica; western tower 19th century	
Serrahn, Kuchelmiß (Rostock district)	Village Church	2nd half of 13th century	most of the tower medieval, most of the nave Gothic Revival	
Slate, Parchim	Village Church	last Q. of 14th century	nave of brick, tower of boulders with edges of brick	
Stäbelow; SW of Rostock	Village Church	end 13th century	aisleless, vaults, tower newer and of yellow brick	
Steffenshagen (Rostock district)	Village Church	late 13th century	terra cotta friezes; western three bays & tower 19th century	
Burg Stargard south of Neubrandenburg	Stargard Castle	12th & mid 13th century		
Sternberg northeast of Schwerin	City Church	1309–1322	hallchurch	
Suckow, Ruhner Berge; SE of Schwerin	Village Church	late 16th century	predecessor early 14th century	
Sülstorf (Ludwigslust-Parchim) south of Schwerin	Village Church	15th century	Knights Hospitaller	
Bad Sülze (Vorpommern-Rügen)	City Church	about mid 13th century		
Tarnow (Rostock district)	Village Church	14th century		
Tessin east-southeast of Rostock	City Church	14th century	basilica, choir partly of boulders, entrance hall Gothic Revival style	
Teterow	St. Peter and St. Paul Church	since 1215; tower before 1450	basilica	
Teterow	Town gates Rostocker Tor ('Rostock Gate'), Malchiner Tor ('Malchin Gate')	14th century		
Thulendorf (Rostock district)	Village Church	13th century, choir 15th century	boulders & some brick	
Vorbeck, Gneven (Ludwigslust-Parchim)	Village Church		eastern gable Early Gothic, other parts Baroque or Gothic revival	
Waren (Müritz)	St. George's Church	14th century	basilica; Gothic Revival alterations	
Waren (Müritz)	St. Mary's Church	Gothic parts 14th century	choir 13th century of stone	
Wamckow, Kobrow (Ludwigslust-Parchim)	Village Church	2nd half of 15th century	building of boulders with edges & windows of brick	
Wanzka, Blankensee; S of Neubrandenburg	Monastery Wanzka	1275–1290	former Cistercian nunnery	
Wattmannshagen, Lalendorf (Rostock district)	Village Church	1260 & 1283		
Weltzin, Burow (Meck. Lakes distr.)	Village Church	15th or 16th century	lower parts of the walls with boulders, long sides of the nave partly renewed in 16th or 17th century	
Westenbrügge, Biendorf (Rostock district)	Village Church	13th century	cross-shaped footplan, elegant southern gable	
Wiendorf near Schwaan (Rostock district)	Village Church			
Wismar	St. George's Church	oldest part about 1300, completed in 15th century	after partial collapse of the WW. II ruin in 1990, reconstruction until 2010; a principal example of Brick Gothic	
Wismar	Church of the Holy Spirit	1220–1226	church of the medieval hospital	
Wismar	St Nicholas Church	1380 – 2nd half of 15th century	basilica with an older predecessor; galleries of large terracotta sculptures in the southern gable	
Wismar	St. Mary's Church	after 1339 – 15th century	World War II damage, nave dynamited in 1960, only tower preserved	
Wismar	Alter Schwede, Wismar	about 1380	private house, now restaurant	
Wismar	Archidiakonat ('Archdeacons's House')	mid 15th century	private house	
Wismar	Wassertor ('Water Gate')	3rd quarter 15th century		
Wittenburg	St. Bartholomew's Church	1240–1287	started in Romanesque style	
Wittenburg	Former castle with Amtsberg Tower		middling storey of brick, upper storey modern, other parts of the castle ruins or ground structures	
Wittenburg	City fortifications with watchtowers, e.g. Amtsberg Tower, Hunger Tower, Stork Tower			
Woldegk	St. Peter's Church	1250, Schiff 1442	hall nave of brick, choir & tower of boulders	
Woosten, Goldberg (Ludwigslust-Parchim)	Village Church	mid 13th / early 14th century	pure brick	
Zapel near Crivitz (Ludwigslust-Parchim)	Village Church	early 14th century ?	walls of boulders, windows & buttresses of brick, timber-framed tower	
Zarrentin on lake Schaalsee	Monastery Zarrentin	church primarily Romanesque of stone about 1240, Brick Gothic enlargements about 1310 and 1460; convent building 15th century or earlier		
Zieslübbe, Domsühl near Parchim	Village Church	late 15th century		
Zittow, Leezen east coast of Lake Schwerin	Village Church	since mid 13th century	brick: gable of the Early Gothic choir, Late Gothic porch, Baroque & retrospective tower	
Zurow; SE of Wismar (Nordwestmecklenburg)	Village Church	end 13th century		

=== Rügen island ===
Place	Building	Time of construction	Notes	Image
Altefähr near Stralsund	St. Nikolai Church			
Altenkirchen northern Rügen	Village Church	about 1200	Danish building, apse & choir Romanesque, nave Early Gothic, pseudo-basilica	
Bergen auf Rügen	St. Mary's Church	Gothic 1380 and after 1445	basilica, 1180–1193 built of brick in Romanesque style, founded by the Princes of Rügen, projected as a cathedral, temporarily monastic church of Benedictine or Cistercian nuns	
Bessin, Rambin	Bessin Chapel	1482	octagon	
Bobbin, Glowe	St. Paul's Church	about 1400		
Garz/Rügen	St. Peter's Church	13th & 15th century	aisleless, vaulted	
Gingst	St. James' Church	15th century	altering reconstruction after fire of 1726	
Groß Zicker, Mönchgut	Village Church	before 1360		
Gustow	Village Church	choir 1250, nave 15th century		
Kasnevitz, Putbus	St. James' Church	2nd half of 14th century	tower 1768	
Landow, Dreschvitz	Village Church	1312		
Lancken-Granitz	St. Andrew's Church	15th century		
Poseritz	St. Mary's Church	1302–1325	aisleless	
Prohn; NW of Stralsund	Village Church	mid 13th to mid 14th century	2-naved hall church	
Rambin	St. John's Church	since before 1300		
Rappin	St. Andrew's Church	c. 1300 & c. 1400		
Sagard	St. Michael's Church	c. 1400 & 1500	choir (replaced) and tower (added) of an originally Romanesque building of 1210	
Schaprode	St. John's Church	Romanesque early 13th century, Gothic about 1450	apse Romanesque, choir Romanesque wizh Gothic alterations, nave Gothic	
Swantow, Poseritz	St. Stephen's Church	late 15th century	predecessor mentioned in 1294	
Trent	St. Catherine's Church	14th century		
Vilmnitz, Putbus	Village Church	mid 13th – 15th century	choir & sacristy Early Gothic, nave & tower Late Gothic	
Waase, Ummanz	St. Mary's Church	14th/15th century		
Zudar peninsula	St. Lawrence's Church	14th century		

=== Hither Pomerania without Rügen ===
Place	Building	Time of construction	Notes	Image
Abtshagen, Wittenhagen	Church of the Holy Spirit	1380	inside facilities from 19th century	
Altentreptow (Meck. Lakes distr.)	St. Peter's Church	mid 13th to 1st half 14th century	Hall church	
Altentreptow (Meck. Lakes distr.)	Demminer Tor ('Demmin Gate')	about 1450		
Altentreptow (Meck. Lakes distr.)	Neubrandenburger Tor ('Neubrandenburg Gate')	about 1450		
Anklam	St. Mary's Church	2nd half 13th to late 14th century	hall church; planned with two towers, not completed, thus asymmetric	
Anklam	St. Nikolai Church	14th century	heavily damaged in 1945, reconstruction after late start now almost perfect	
Anklam	Steintor ('Stone Gate')	13th/14th century		
Barth	St. Mary's Church			
Barth	St. George's Church	1380	former hospital, now center of Bible studies	
Barth	Dammtor ('Dam Gate')			
Behrenhoff (Vorpommern-Greifswald)	Village Church			
Bodstedt, Fuhlendorf (Vorpommern-Rügen)	St. Ubald's Church	1465	former pilgrimage	
Brandshagen, Sundhagen (Vorpommern-Rügen)	St. Mary's Church	choir 13th, nave 14th century	hall church, Cistercian	
Franzburg	Castle Church	about 1300, since 1583, 1876/77	originally a transept of Neuenkamp Abbey Church, then a palace church, finally since 17th century a town church; 16th century to 1876 flat roof, stepped gable 19th century Gothic Revival style; hall with tribunes	
Gramzow, Krusenfelde (Vorpommern-Greifswald)	Village Church		step by step reduced in 18th & 19th centuries	
Greifswald	St. Mary's Church	1330 to early 15th century	hall church	
Greifswald	St. Nikolai	mid 14th to 1st quarter 15th century	basilica	
Greifswald	St. James' Church	First mentioned 1280, renovation circa 1400	Early Gothic hall church	
Greifswald	House at Markt 11	probably after 1400	one of the most richly decorated 'citizen's houses' (Bürgerhaus) in Northern Germany	
municipality of Greifswald	Eldena Abbey	1225–1265, additions until 1350	former Cistercian monastery, now in ruins	
Grimmen	St. Mary's Church	since 1275	hall church	
Grimmen	Town Hall	14th century	tower Baroque	
Grimmen	Kaland House	about 1450		
Grimmen	Three city gates: Stralsunder Tor ('Stralsund Gate'), Mühlentor ('Mill Gate'), Greifswalder Tor ('Greifswald Gate')	14th century		
Horst, Sundhagen	Village Church	14th/15th century	aisleless, lower parts of the tower also of boulders	
Groß Kiesow (Vorpommern-Greifswald)	Village Church			
Hanshagen (Vorpommern-Greifswald)	Village Church			
Hohendorf, Wolgast (Vorpommern-Greifswald)	Village Church			
Kagenow, Neetzow-Liepen (Vorpommern-Greifswald)	Village Church		enlarged by boulders; was temporarily plastered	
Kartlow, Kruckow (Vorpommern-Greifswald)	St. John's Church	1249	stepped gables and tower Gothic Revival 1860–1870	
Katzow (Vorpommern-Greifswald)	St. John's Church	about 1300		
Kemnitz (Vorpommern-Greifswald)	Holy Cross Church	14th century	tower Gothic Revival	
Kirchdorf, Sundhagen	Village Church	14th century		
Klempenow Castle (Meck. Lakes distr.)		13th century ff.		
Krien (Meck. Lakes distr.)	Village Church	since 1280	choir today plastered except the gables of the choir (lower part) and the vestry	
Kröslin (Vorpommern-Greifswald)	Village Church	13th century		
Lassan	St. John's Church	13th century	inside columns and vaults partly renewed in 1883	
Löcknitz	Castle		1250–1479 several changes of control; simple donjon and some outer walls preserved and re-completed	
Lüssow, Gützkow (Vorpommern-Greifswald)	Village Church	15th century?	massive alterations 1877/1878	
Morgenitz, Mellenthin; Usedom	Village Church	about 1500		
Neu Boltenhagen (Vorpommern-Greifswald)	St. Mary's Church	brick 14th century		
Neuenkirchen (Vorpommern-Greifswald)	Village Church	13th/14th century		
Nossendorf; NW of Demmin (Meck. Lakes distr.)	Village Church	13th century	lower parts of boulders	
Pasewalk	St. Mary's Church	14th century	hall church; tower collapsed in 1983/84 and replaced since 1988 using concrete	
Pasewalk	Holy Spirit Hospital	13th century	Romanesque-Gothic; relics of a medieval hot air heating	
Pasewalk	Elendenhaus	1350s	originally a pilgrims' hostal	
Pasewalk	St. Nikolai Church	since 12th century, brick early 16th century	gabel and attached arches of a building mainly built of boulders; alterations in Renaissance and Gothic Revival style	
Pasewalk	town fortifications	15th century	Mühlentor ('Mill Gate'); Prenzlauer Tor ('Prenzlau Gate'); Kiek in de Mark (fortified tower); Pulverturm (powder tower)	
Reinkenhagen, Sundhagen (Vorpommern-Rügen)	Village Church	brick about 1400	begun in 13th century 1300 by boulders; reconstructions of nave & tower after 30 Years War	
Ribnitz-Damgarten (Ribnitz historically to Mecklenburg)	St. Bartholomew's Church	brick 15th century	Gothic enlargement of a Romanesque stone building. The tower is Gothic Revival.	
Ribnitz-Damgarten (Ribnitz historically to Mecklenburg)	Rostocker Tor ('Rostock Gate')			
Ribnitz-Damgarten (Ribnitz historically to Mecklenburg)	Church of the former Monastery Ribnitz			
Ribnitz-Damgarten (Ribnitz historically to Mecklenburg)	St. Mary's Church			
Richtenberg	St. Nikolai Church	13th cent., brick 15th century	stepped hall of brick, choir of boulders	
Rubkow (Vorpommern-Greifswald)	Village Church	2nd half of 14th century	choir & windows of visible brick, walls of boulders	
Sassen, Sassen-Trantow (Vorpommern-Greifswald)	Village Church	13th & 15th century	eastern part boulders & brick, western part brick	
Schmarsow, Kruckow (Vorpommern-Greifswald)	Village Church	about 1400		
Schönfeld (Meck. Lakes distr.)	Village Church	choir of brick & boulders about 1400, nave of pure brick Gothic Revival		
Starkow, Velgast	St. George's Church	13th century	basilica	
Steinfurth, Karlsburg (Vorpommern-Greifswald)	Church ruin	early 14th century	collapsed 1664	
Stoltenhagen, Grimmen	Village Church	13th century		
Stralsund	St. Nicholas Church	about 1270 to early 15th century	Main church of Stralsund	
Stralsund	Town Hall	13th and 14th centuries	several phases of construction	
Stralsund	St. Mary's Church	1382/84 to late 15th century	second largest brick church in Hanseatic region, basilica	
Stralsund	Holy Ghost Church	14th century	hall church, western façade Gothic Revival	
Stralsund	St. James' Church	after 1300 and after 1400	basilica with older predescendants	
Stralsund	Monastery of St. John	early 14th century	former Franciscan friary, hall church	
Stralsund	Wulflam House			
Stralsund	Monastery of St. Catherine	c. 1250–1300	former Dominican monastery	
Strasburg (Uckermark)	St. Mary's Church	about 1250, brick since 1450	begun of boulders, nave (hall church) of brick	
Reinberg, Sundhagen	Village Church	13th–14th century		
Trantow, Sassen-Trantow (Vorpommern-Greifswald)	Village Church	about 1400		
Tribsees on Trebel river	St. Thomas Church			
Tribsees on Trebel river	Mühlentor ('Mill Gate')			
Tribsees on Trebel river	Steintor ('Stone Gate')			
Usedom (town)	Anklamer Tor ('Anklam Gate')	about 1450		
Velgast	Christ Church	13th & 15th century	aisleless	
Voigdehagen, Stralsund; Vorpommern-Rügen	Village Church	15th century	predecessor 13th century	
Wildberg; NW of Neubrandenburg (Meck. Lakes distr.)	Village Church	Early Gothic choir late 13th century of brick on a base of boulders, Gothic/Renaissance nave 16th century of boulders with few brick		
Wolgast on Peenestrom strait	St. Peter's Church	1280–1350	basilica	
Wolgast on Peenestrom strait	St. Gertrude's Chapel	15th century	12 corners central building	
Wolkow, Wildberg (Meck. Lakes distr.)	Village Church	13th century built of fieldstone, western part of the nave renewed of brick late 19th century		
Zirchow on Usedom island	St. James' Church	15th century	tower of brick and boulders; nave 13th century of boulders	

== Schleswig-Holstein and Hamburg ==
Place	Building	Main period of construction	Special features	Image
Ahrensbök	St. Mary's Church	about 1400	1409–1584 church of a Carthusian monastery	
Behlendorf (District of Duchy of Lauenburg)	Village Church	mid 13th century	boulders with decorations of brick; tower and some windows 1893	
Berkenthin	St. Mary Magdalene's Church	since 1230		
Böel (Schleswig-Flensburg)	St. Ursula's Church	Gothic end 15th century	tower and windows of an originally romanesque church of 1st third of 13th century	
Bordesholm	Bordesholm Monastery Church	1309–1332	former Augustine monastery	
Bad Bramstedt	St. Mary Magdalene's Church	early 14th century		
Büchen	St. Mary's Church	brick 15th century	Gothic brick choir at an older nave from the 12th century	
Büsum; Northern Frisia	St. Clement's Church	15th century	washed	
Cismar	Cismar Abbey	13th century	former Benedictine monastery, one of the first institutions in Holstein to join the Reformation	
Deezbüll, Niebüll; Northern Frisia	Church of the Apostles	14th century		
Eckernförde	St. Nikolai Church	brick 1521–1530	Stepped hall	
Eutin	St. Michael's Church	1st third 13th century, altered in 14th and 15th centuries		
Burg, Fehmarn Island	St. Nicholas Church	13th and 15th century	hall church	
Burg, Fehmarn Island	St. George's Chapel	13th century	Lepra chapel	
Bannesdorf, Fehmarn Island	St. John's Church	13th century		
Landkirchen, Fehmarn Island	St. Peter's Church	about 1230	hall church, Romanesque-Gothic intermediate style	
Petersdorf, Fehmarn Island	St. John's Church	13th century		
Flensburg	Holy Ghost Church			
Flensburg	St. Mary's Church			
Flensburg	St. Nikolai Church	two phases, between 1390 and 1480		
Flensburg	Nordertor			
Flensburg	Former Franciscan Monastery			
Flensburg	Nikolai pharmacy	1490	oldest profane building of Flensburg; painted but not plastered	
Gettorf	St. George's Church	1250–1494	begun in Romanesque style	
Grömitz (seaside of Ostholstein)	St. Nikolai Church	1230 & 15th century	Gothic from the beginning, boulders with additions of brick, such as upper eastern gable, tower 15th century	
Großenbrode (Ostholstein)	St. Catherine's Church		1232 begun by boulders	
Groß Grönau (District of Duchy of Lauenburg)	St. Willehad's Church	mid – late 13th century		
Grube (seaside of Ostholstein)	St. George's Church	about 1460	begun about 1230, tower collapsed in 1718	
Grundhof (Schleswig-Flensburg)	St. Mary's Church	brick 15th century	tower, porch & revisio of windows on a Romanesque church of boulders from 12th century	
Hamberge (Stormarn)	Village Church	1327/1328		
Hamburg	St. Petri			
Hamburg	St. Catherine's Church			
Hamburg	St. James' Church			
Hamburg-Bergedorf	Bergedorf Castle	14th century & later	alterations especially in Renaissance and Historism	
Heiligenhafen	City Church	1250	Romanesque-Gothic intermediate style	
Hemme (Dithmarschen)	St. Mary's Church	14th century	loss of most pointed arches (17th century ?), washed	
Itzehoe (Steinburg)	Monastery Itzehoe	since 1263	Cistercian nunnery; only preserved Gothic brick building is the cloister beside St. Laurentii	
Karby; Schwansen (Rendsburg-Eckernförde)	Village Church	2nd half of 13th century		
Katharinenheerd; Eiderstedt peninsula	St. Catherine's Church	brick since ?	begun 1113	
Keitum; Sylt island	St. Severin	nave 1216, tower c. 1450	nave with Gothic modernizations, different kinds of stone, little brick; tower all brick	
Kiel	St. Nikolai	13th, 14th, 16th century	simplified reconstruction after WW. II	
Lauenburg	St. Mary Magdalene's Church	brick about 1300	base of boulders, nave Brick Gothic, tower & chor Gothic Revival style	
Lauenburg	Castle Tower	1477		
Lensahn	St. Catherine's Church	since 1245, choir after 1300	aisleless	
Lübeck	St. Mary's Church	From 1251, completed late 14th century	Basilica; most influential Brick Gothic building	
Lübeck	Town Hall	1298–1444	Langes Haus ('Long House') 1298–1308, main building 1340–50, Kriegsstubenbau ('War Chambre') 1442–44	
Lübeck	Cathedral	Gothic 1266–15th century	construction started in 1173 by Henry the Lion, consecrated 1247	
Lübeck	Holstentor	1466–78	major later additions, still in Gothic age	
Lübeck	Burgtor			
Lübeck	St Peter's Church	late 13th to 15th century	several phases	
Lübeck	St James' Church	after 1276 to 1334		
Lübeck	Aegidienkirche	1st half 14th century		
Lübeck	St. Catherine's Church	1300–1330	former Franciscan mendicant church	
Lübeck	Hospital of the Holy Spirit	about 1276–1286		
Lübeck	Burgkloster	after 1276 to 1401	former Dominican monastery, modern additions	
Lübeck	Monastery of St. Anne		former Augustinian nunnery, damaged by fire in 1843	
Lübeck	Chancery	1484	Renaissance enlargements 1588 and 1614	
Lübeck	Several citizens' houses			
Krummesse outskirts of Lübeck	St. John's Church	1230	tower about 1400	
Lütjenburg (Plön district)	St. Michael's Church	Gothic 13th century	choir & vaults of a primarily Romanesque church; aisleless	
Malente (seaside of Ostholstein)	St. Mary Magdalene's Church	13th century	boulders & brick; tower & reparations 1893	
Meldorf	St. John's Church	1230–1300		
Mölln (District of Duchy of Lauenburg)	St. Nikolai Church	Gothic 1391 & 1470/71	begun about 1200 as a Romanesque brick basilica	
Mölln (District of Duchy of Lauenburg)	Town Hall	1373	built under the rule of Lübeck	
Mustin (District of Duchy of Lauenburg)	St. Mary Magdalene's Church	late 12th/early 13th century	begun in Romanesque style, lower parts of boulders	
Neuendorf bei Elmshorn (Steinburg)	Trinity Church	1504	after destruction in 30 Years' War rebuilt in 1629 andenlarged in 1722	
Neuenkirchen (Dithmarschen)	St. James' Church	14th & 18th century	rebuilt in Baroque style using much of the Gothic walls	
Neukirchen (seaside of Ostholstein)	St. Anthony's Church	founded 1244/1245	Romano-Gothic brick building	
Neustadt in Holstein	City Church	1258–1350	pseudo-basilica, upper storeys of the steeple 19th century	
Neuwerk Island	Great Tower	1300–1310	oldest secular building on the German North Sea coast	
Oldenswort; Eiderstedt peninsula	with proviso: St. Pancras' Church	about 1245 & 1456–1485	Gothic additions of choir & tower mostly in Romanesque forms	
Preetz	Preetz Priory	1325–1340	had a predecessor of 1280s	
Pronstorf (Segeberg distr.)	St. Vicelin's Church	choir 14th century	Romanesque building of boulders with Gothic additions of brick	
Rendsburg	St. Mary's Church	1287–1330	hall church; predecessor in the 12th century	
Rensefeld, Bad Schwartau	St. Fabian and St. Sebastian Church	1164 (?)		
Rabenkirchen-Faulück on Schlei inlet	St. Mary's Church	brick 15th century	tower of red and pale brick, nave of boulders (12th century) several times altered	
Schleswig	Schleswig Cathedral	1275–1320	tower 19th & 20th centuries	
Bad Schwartau near Lübeck	St. George's Church	1508	predecessor lepra chapel of 1289	
Seedorf (District of Duchy of Lauenburg)	St. Clement and St. Catherine Church	1230	tower 1872	
Seester (Pinneberg)	St. John's Church	15th century	since 1889, medieval walls hidden by a Gothic Revival skin	
Sterley (District of Duchy of Lauenburg)	St. John's Church	13th century	walls of boulders with windows of brick; inside medieval frescos	
Tetenbüll; Eiderstedt peninsula	St. Anne's Church	about 1400		
Tönning; Northern Frisia	St. Lawrence's Church	since 1186	northern windows still Romanesque, reconstruction with Gothic windows in 15th century, choir added 1633, 1703 reconstruction with wooden barrel vault	
Westensee west of Kiel	St. Catherine's Church	Gothic about 1400	begun mid 13th century by boulders	
Westerhever; Eiderstedt	St. Stephen's Church	tower 1370	nave 1804	
Wewelsfleth (Steinburg)	Trinity Church	1503	Renaissance enlargement & alteration in 1593/1594	
Zarpen (Stormarn)	Village Church	13th century	nave Romanesque, tower Gothic	

== Lower Saxony and Bremen ==
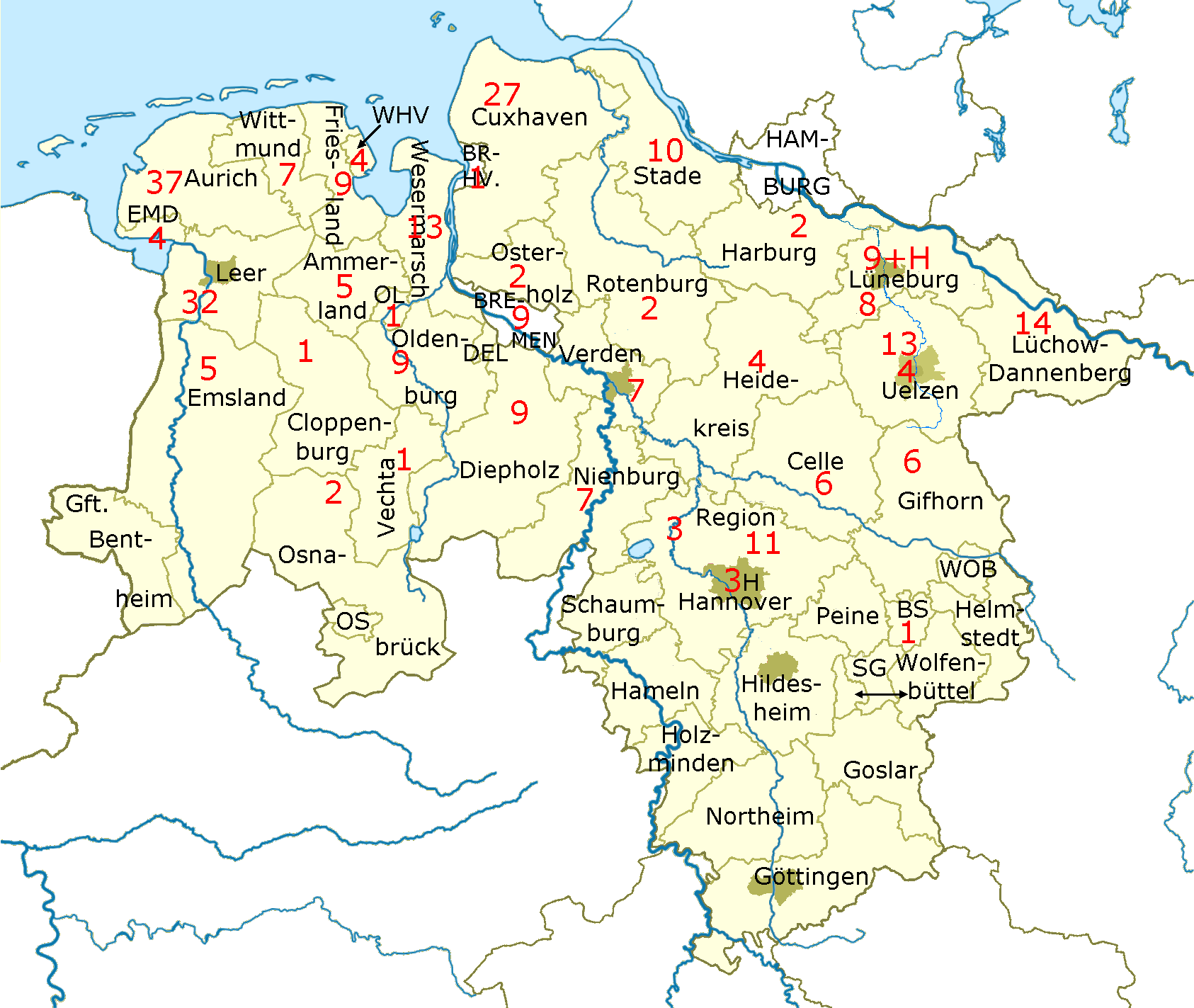
Numbers of Brick Gothic buildings in the districts of Lower Saxony, in its Hanover Region and in the free city of Bremen, in some cases split into the central city and the rest of the territory; red H = several civic houses

Place	Building	Main period of construction	Special features	Image
Achim (Verden district)	St. Lawrence's Church	13th century	choir and southern transept of an originally Romanesque church	
Altenesch, Lemwerder	St. Gall's Church	13th century	battlefield of the Stedinger Crusade	
Altenoythe, Friesoythe (Cloppenburg district)	St. Vitus's Church	brick 13th & 15th century	enlargement of a Romanesque building of boulders	
Apen (Ammerland)	St. Nikolai Church	1238	early Gothic	
Aschendorf, Papenburg (Emsland)	St. Amand's Church	13th–15th century	enlarged in modern style in 1969	
Asendorf (Diepholz district)	St. Marcellus Church	tower 1524	nave older, but later rebuilt	
Atens, Nordenham (Wesermarsch)	St. Mary's Church	1600–1606	brick & boulders, very late Gothic; predecessor of 1509 possibly about 100 metres distant	
Backemoor, Rhauderfehn	Ss. Vincent and Lawrence Church	13th century	nave Romanesque, tower Gothic	
Bangstede, Ihlow (East Frisia)	Bangstede Church	13th century	Romanesque/Gothic	
Bardewisch, Lemwerder	Holy Cross Church	1st half of 14th century	Hall church with three parallel roofs	
Bardowick (Lüneburg district)	Ss. Peter and Paul Church	1389–1485		
Barrien, Syke (Diepholz district)	St. Bartholomew's Church	brick 14th century	Gothic enlargement of a church of boulders from 12th century	
Bassum (Diepholz district)	Collegiate Church		basically Romanesque, completed in Gothic style, hall church	
Bad Bederkesa, Geestland (Cuxhaven district)	Bederkesa Castle	first section before 1460	Late Gothic and Renaissance	
Berne	St. Giles' Church	13th century	originally Romanesque, early Gothic enlargement of bricks, traverse roofs	
Betzendorf (Lüneburg district)	Ss. Peter and Paul Church	brick 1450–1460	choir, vaults & buttresses of brick at an older church of boulders from 1250 & 1350	
Bispingen (Heidekreis)	Ole Kerk (Old Church)	1353		
Blexen, Nordenham	St. Hippolytus' Church	tower 13th century & after 1410 & 1566	choir & nave Romanesque, since 1150	
Borstel (Diepholz district)	St. Nikolai Church	mid 13th century	only the eastern attic of brick, above a landlords proper church of boulders; window below it from 19th century	
Braunschweig	Liberei	1413–1422	Oldest surviving library building north of the Alps	
Bremen	St. Martin's Church	13th & 14th century	Late Gothic	
Bremen	St. John's Church borough Mitte	14th century	originally Franciscan church, re-catholized in early 19th century	
Bremen	St. John's Church borough Obervieland	about 1250	in Arsten suburb, Obervieland	
Bremen	City Hall	1405–1410; 1608–1612 altered in style of Weser Renaissance	in Gothic state hip roof without decorated gables, all windows with pointed arches, already the twelve monumental sculptures	
Bremen	Cathedral		only the Gothic chapels of visible brick	
Bremen	Church of Our Lady	since 1230 & about 1300	attics of the traverse roofs of the building otherwise outside showing stone	
Bremen	St. Stephen's Church	alterations of the 13th century	of brick: northern gable and the attic of the eastern gable (the southern gable after the destructions of WW. II was rebuilt as a free imitation)	
Bremen	Spitzen Gebel	about 1400	Bremen's last Gothic private house, large windows 1590; rebuilt 1948–1950	
Bremen	St. Catherine's Monastery	1253–1284	only refectory preserved; church 1579–1820 used as arsenal, demolished in 1888	
Bremen	Burg Blomendal	1353	several alterations in Baroque, Rococo and Historism	
Bruchhausen-Vilsen (Diepholz district)	St. Cyriacus' Church	brick late 13th century	Gothic enlargement (transept & choir) of a boulder building from c. 1200; masonry portals in the 16th century; gothic revival additions in 1883/1885	
Bunde (Leer district)	Reformed Church	about 1200 and 1270/80	large parts Romanesque; west of Ems river, near the Dutch border	
Bussau, Clenze; Wendland	Village Church		tower mainly of boulders, but edges, Gothic windows and a simple frieze of brick, western façade repaired by brick; nave of framework lost	
Buxtehude (Stade district)	St. Peter's Church	13th century & 19th century	choir and aisles replaced in 1898/1899	
Campen, Krummhörn (East Frisia)	Reformed Church	late 13th century	Romanesque/Gothic	
Cuxhaven	Ritzebüttel Castle	14th century	later extensions	
Dannenberg (Elbe)	St. John's Church	about 1385	predecessor 12th century; later alterations; 1812 loss of the choir	
Detern (Leer district); East Frisia	Bell tower of Ss. Stephen and Bartholomew Church			
Detern (Leer district); East Frisia	Stickhausen Castle	tower 1498		
Dörverden (Verden district)	Ss. Cosmas and Damian Church	brick 15th century	eastern prolongation of a Romanesque nave	
Dötlingen (Oldenburg district)	St. Fermin's Church	brick 2nd half of 13th century	Gothic enlargement of a Romanesque brick building	
Dorum (Cuxhaven district)	St. Urban Church	1510	late Gothic hall choir at an older aisleless nave	
Drakenburg (Nienburg district)	St. John the Baptist's Church	14th–15th century	choir younger than the nave	
Ebstorf (Uelzen district)	Ebstorf Abbey	14th century	Premonstratensian, later Benedictine monastery	
Eckwarden, Butjadingen (Wesermarsch)	St. Lambert Church	13th century		
Eldingen (Celle district)	St. Mary's Church		mainly of boulders, northern central entrance Brick Gothic, northern and western porches Gothic revival	
Elsfleth (Wesermarsch)	St. Nikolai Church	nave since 1220 of boulders, tower of brick, still medieval with basket arch windows		
Emden; East Frisia	Great Church	14th–16th century	Older predecessor; after destruction in WW II, for worship a simpler new church was built beside the old one. Later, the old building was rebuilt to house the Reformed John à Lasco library.	
Emden; East Frisia	Twixlum Church	about 1500	in the district Twixlum of Emden	
Engerhafe, Südbrookmerland; East Frisia	St. John the Baptist's Church	1250 – 1280	aisleless	
Esenshamm, Nordenham (Wesermarsch)	St. Matthew's Church	nave since 1220 of boulders, tower of brick, still medieval with basket arch windows		
Esklum, Westoverledingen (Leer district)	Esklum Church	13th & 14th centuries		
Esperke, Neustadt am Rübenberge (Hanover Region)	Esperke Chapel	early 14th century		
Fedderwarden, Wilhelmshaven	St. Stephen's Church	Late Romanesque church with Gothic vaults and only inside Gothic window arches		
Funnix, Wittmund	St. Florian's Church	about 1300	about 1500 shortened in the west by 3 m	
Fürstenau (Osnabrück district)	Stift Börstel ('Collegiate Börstel')	since mid 13th century	former Cistercian convent	
Ganderkesee (Oldenburg district)	Ss.Cyprian and Cornelius Church	15th century	stone church since 1052, Gothic enlargement (hall church), brick at all edges, but much of the walls of boulders	
Gandersum, Moormerland (Leer district)	Gandersum Church	14th century	choir lost, windows possibly enlarged	
Garßen, Celle	St. Mark's Church	14th century		
Gerdau (Uelzen district)	St. Michael's Church	tower early 16th century	nave 1888–1891	
Greetsiel, Krummhörn (East Frisia)	Greetsiel Church	1380–1410		
Grimersum, Krummhörn (East Frisia)	Grimersum Church	13th century	Romanesque/Gothic	
Groothusen, Krummhörn (East Frisia)	Groothusen Church	nave 1425	Romanesque steeple about 1225	
Groß Liedern, Uelzen	St. George Chapel	2nd half of 14th century		
Groß Midlum, Hinte (Aurich district)	Groß Midlum Church			
Großwolde, Westoverledingen (Leer district)	Großwolde Church	between 1250 & 1350	windows later enlarhed	
Hage (East Frisia)	St. Ansgar's Church	Gothic 1480–1490	Gothic choir of a generally Romanesque building	
Hagen im Bremischen (Cuxhaven district)	Hagen Castle	1502–1507	post of the Archbishops of Bremen	
Hankensbüttel	Isenhagen Abbey	1435	aisleless, flat ceiling; originally Cistercian convent, nowadays Lutheran convent	
Hanover	Marktkirche	14th century		
Hanover	Old Town Hall	1303, gable 1453/55	destroyed in WWII, main gable reconstructed in 1964	
Hanover	Towers of the Landwehr	14th century	Hanover Landwehr	
Haselünne (Emsland)	St. Vincent Church	15th centuryt	nave walls mainly of brick, vault ribs and tower of stone	
Hatzum, Jemgum in Rheiderland (Leer district)	St. Sebastian's Church	end 13th century	round arches at the lower wall sections of the choir, but pointed arch windows	
Heiligenrode, Stuhr	Monastery Church St. Mary	about 1300	aisleless	
Heppens, Wilhelmshaven	St. Nikolai Church	nave about 1350	tower Neo-Romanesque	
Hinte (Aurich district); East Frisia	Reformed Church	15th century	late Gothic with an older – Romanesque – bell house	
Holle, Hude (Oldenburg district)	St. Denis' Church	1277	western gable restored in modern layout	
Holtgaste, Jemgum in Rheiderland (Leer district)	St. Ludger's Church	13th century	initially Romanesque, choir Gothic	
Holtorf, Schnackenburg (Lüchow-Dannenberg)	Village Church	14th century	nave in 1745 altered to a moderate Baroque	
Hoya (Nienburg district)	former St. Martin's Church		only choir of brick	
Hude	Hude Monastery	13th century	nowadays in ruins	
Hude	St. Elizabeth Church	13th century	founded as a gate chapel for lay people who were not allowed into the monastery church	
Jennelt, Krummhörn (East Frisia)	Jennelt Church	2nd half of 13th century	nave Romanesque, tower Gothic	
Jeetzel, Lüchow; Wendland	Jeetzel Chapel	15th century	with pointed arch of a former entrance; 17th century enlargement by framework	
Jork (Stade district); Altes Land	St. Matthias' Church	13th century (or 15th)	alterations around 1664 and 1709	
Kirchhatten, Hatten (Oldenburg district)	St. Ansgar's Church	between 1230 & 1260	vaults of the nave removed in 1682, windows enlarged probably 1676	
Leer; East Frisia	Harderwykenburg	about 1450	fortified house, whitewashed	
Leerhafe, Wittmund	Ss. Cecilia and Margaret Church	about 1500		
Lemgow (Lüchow-Dannenberg district); Wendland	High Church	steeple since 1450	lnave of 14th century replaced in 1770/10771	
Lemwerder	Chapel at the Dike	1260		
Liebenau	St. Lawrence's Church	2nd half of 13th century	rectangular choir of brick, nave successively of stone	
Lilienthal	Abbey church St. Mary's	1250–1262	early Gothic	
Logabirum, Leer (East Frisia)	Logabirum Church	about 1300	enlargement and new windows in 1812, steeple 1879 & 1960 ff.	
Loxstedt (Cuxhaven district)	St. Mary's Church	before 1506		
Lüchow; Wendland	St. John's Church	early 15th century		
Lüchow; Wendland	Lüchow Castle	end 14th century	in the 18th century farly demolished	
Luckau; Wendland	St. Mary Magdalene Chapel	13th century	edges, Gothic windows and some small sections of the walls of brick	
Lüder (Uelzen district)	St. Bartholomew's Church	1373	at least base of the tower medieval; upper storeys of the tower about 1800	
Lüneburg	St. John's Church, Lüneburg	1300–1370		
Lüneburg	Town Hall	1st half to end 13th century		
Lüneburg	St. Michaelis Church	about 1379		
Lüneburg	St. Nicolai Church	1407–1440		
Lüneburg	Glockenhaus and Glockenhof ('Bell House' and 'Bell Yard')	1482	former arsenal	
Lüneburg	Lüner Hof ('Lüne Yard')		former dependency of Lüne Abbey	
Lüneburg	Numerous 'citizen's houses' ('Bürgerhäuser')			
Lüneburg	Lüne Abbey		outside the city	
Manslagt, Krummhörn (East Frisia)	Manslagt Church	about 1400		
Mariendrebber, Drebber	Ss. Mary and Pancras Church	13th & 15th century	only unilateral transept, various different Gothic vaults, outer appearance altered in the 19th century	
Marienhafe	St. Mary's Church	13th century	formerly triple-naved church with 80-m tower doubling as landmark for shipping, in 1829 tower reduced and part of church demolished for financial reasons	
Mariensee, Neustadt am Rübenberge (Hanover Region)	Monastery Church of the Kloster Mariensee	13th century	1867 massive Gothic revival alterations	
Midlum, Jemgum in Rheiderland (Leer district)	Midlum Church	early or mid 13th century	Gothic alterations of an originally Romanesque building	
Mitling-Mark, Westoverledingen (Leer district)	Mitling-Mark Church	13th century	former large pointe darch portal in the southern wall, two closed hagioscopes	
Müden (Örtze) (Celle district)	St. Lawrence's Church	vaults 1444	outside nowadays Gothic Revival	
Munster (Heidekreis)	St. Urban Church	Gothic since 1519	only northern sied of the nave between steeple and transept of medieval brick	
Neuende, Wilhelmshaven	St. James' Church	choir early 13th century Romanesque of granite, nave late 14th century of brick, one round & 7 pointed arch windows, tower Late Gothic 16th century		
Neuenkirchen (Cuxhaven district)	St. Mary's Church	14th & 16th century		
Neustadt am Rübenberge (Hanover Region)	Our Lady's Church	13th century, Gothic 1502	Nave enlarged of brick; tower of stone, base older, top newer than the nave	
Nienburg/Weser	St. Martin's Church	15th century	Romanesque predecessor on stone, 13th century	
Norden; East Frisia	St. Ludger's Church	15th century	Choir, transept and separate belfry of an originally Romanesque building	
Ochtelbur, Ihlow; East Frisia	Ochtelbur Church	13th century	Romanesque/Gothic	
Oldenburg	St. Gertrude's Chapel, Gertrude Cemetery	13th–15th century		
Oldendorp, Jemgum; Rheiderland (Leer district)	Oldendorp Church	13th century	Early Gothioc; wooden barrel vault	
Oldenstadt, Uelzen	Oldenstadt Monastery Church	stone between 1150 & 1200	southern transept gable of a Romanesque stone building	
Otterndorf (Cuxhaven district)	St. Severus' Church	13th–15th centuries	Renaissance alterations, Steeple 19th century	
Plate, Lüchow; Wendland	St. Mary's Church	13th century	Romanesque & Gothic; renovations Gothic Revival	
Pogum, Jemgum in Rheiderland (Leer district)	Pogum Church		church itself replaced in 1776	
Quakenbrück (Osnabrück district)	St. Sylvester's Church	13th–15th centuries	only parts of the walls of the aisles of brick	
Rastede	St. Ulrich's Church	brick 15th century	oldest parts, such as the crypt, since 1100; has a steeple & a bell tower	
Remels, Uplengen (Leer district)	St. Martin's Church	brick about 1300	Gothic nave about 1/3 of brick, tower Gothic revival	
Reepsholt, Friedeburg (Wittmund district)	St. Maurice's Church	brick since about 1300	lower wall sections of granite, tower since Thirty Years' War in ruins	
Rhaude, Rhauderfehn (Leer district)	Rhaude Church	early 14th century	window arches minimally pointed; polygonal choir of 15th century	
Rhede	Old Village Church	13th – 15th century	west of Ems river	
Rießen, Steyerberg (Nienburg district)	St. Catherine's Church	13th century	Brick Gothic former portal, else plastered	
Rodewald (Nienburg district)	St. Giles' Church	13th century	restoration after fire of the steeple in the 19th century	
Rodewald (Nienburg district)	St. John's Church	about 1330		
Riepe, Ihlow (East Frisia)	Riepe Church		late Gothic	
Rorichum, Moormerland (Leer district)	St. Nikolai Church	early 14th century	originally of boulders, enlarged in brick	
Satemin, Lüchow; Wendland	Village Church		eastern part with a decored gable all of brick, western part more boulders	
Schinna, Stolzenau	Monastery Schinna	13th/14th century	in the 16th century convent buildings altered to farm buildings, Gothic church substituted by a half timbered church	
Schmalförden, Ehrenburg (Diepholz district)	St. Nikolai Church	3rd fourth 13th century	tower 1755, masonry	
Schnega; Wendland	St. Michael's Church	14th century	choir; rest Gothic Revival	
Schönemoor, Ganderkesee (Oldenburg district)	St. Catherine's Church	1324	choir partly of boulders, possibly older	
Simonswolde, Ihlow (East Frisia)	Simonswolde Church	13th century	Romanesque/Gothic	
Spaden, Schiffdorf (Cuxhaven district)	Spaden Chapel ("Klus")			
Stade	St. Willehad's Church	14th century	hall church	
Stapelmoor, Weener (Leer district)	Stapelmoor Church	1250–1275	Romanesque & Gothic	
Stedesdorf (Wittmund district)	St. Giles' Church	Gothic 1350	Gothic relaunch and enlargement of a Romanesque church, partly tuff	
Steenfelde, Westoverledingen (Leer district)	Steenfelde Church	1429 partly rebuilt	originally late Romanesque; Windows 1860	
Steinbild, Kluse, (Emsland district)	St. George's Church	1512	division (but not outer shape) of the windows end 19th c., most of the outer skin renovated 1988/89	
Stuhr	St. Pancras' Church	13th century	built in 3 phases, aisleless	
Tergast, Moormerland (Leer district)	Tergast Church	13th century	western gable 19th century after a storm	
Tossens, Butjadingen (Wesermarsch)	St. Bartholomew's Church	Gothic end 15th century	choir added to a Romanesque nave	
Uelzen	St. Mary's Church	13th–14th century		
Uelzen	St. Gertrude's Chapel	1511–1513		
Uelzen	Holy Ghost Chapel	about 1320		
Uelzen	Evangelische Probstei ('provostry')	1st half of 15th century		
Uttum, Krummhörn (East Frisia)	Uttum Church	13th century	nave Romanesque, tower Gothic	
Veenhusen, Moormerland (Leer district)	Veenhusen Church	about 1290	steeple 1869	
Veerßen, Uelzen	St. Mary's Church	1302		
Verden	Cathedral	Gothic 1290–1323 & 1473–1490	stone (1100) and brick (about 1150) tower of Romanesque predecessor	
Völlen, Westoverledingen (Leer district)	Ss. Peter and Paul Church	15th & 16th centuries		
Walsrode	Chapel of Walsrode Abbey	1483	Reconstruction after a fire caused by a lightning in 1482	no photo of the chapel available
Weene, Ihlow (East Frisia)	St. Nikolai Church	13th century	Romanesque/Gothic	
Weener (Leer district)	Reformed Church	choir 1462	about 1230 Romanesque; 1785 wooden barrel vaults; north side Gothic Revival transept	
Werdum (Wittmund district)	St. Nikolai Church	1327	massive Neo-Romanesque alterations	
Westerholt (Wittmund district)	Westerholt Church	1250–1270	western gable Gothic	
Westerstede (Ammerland)	St. Peter's Church	Gothic 13th/14th centuries	with a western steeple and a separate bell tower	
Wiefelstede	St. John's Church	15th century	upper parts of choir and western tower and the whole separate bell tower; other parts Romanesque of boulders since 1200	
Wienhausen	Wienhausen Abbey	13th and 14th century	Cistercian nunnery	
Wildeshausen (Oldenburg district)	St. Alexander's Church	1224–1270	partly amazing mixture of Romanesque and Gothic elements; base of the tower of stone, portal 1540	
Wildeshausen (Oldenburg district)	Town Hall	13th–15th century		
Wirdum, East Frisia	Village Church	14th century		
Wittingen	St. Stephen's Church	about 1250	nave Romanesque, tower and choir Gothic	
Wieren, Wrestedt (Uelzen district)	Old Church Wieren	brick 1433	choir of a church of boulders	
Wolterdingen, Soltau (Heidekreis)	Holy Ghost Church	since 1245		
Zebelin, Waddeweitz; Wendland	Zebelin Church	13th century and ?	Gothic tower mainly of brick; brick parts of the nave younger	
Zeetze, Luckau; Wendland	St. John's Church		tower Late Gothic, mainly brick, nave Romanesque, mainly boulders	
Bad Zwischenahn (Ammerland)	St. John's Church	choir mid 15th century	stylistically only eastern gable Gothic	

== North Rhine-Westphalia ==
In North Rhine-Westphalia, Brick Gothic is concentrated west of the Rhine north of Bonn and in western Münsterland. The regional style, including the colour of the bricks (very dark or very pale, but seldom very red), is very similar to neighbouring regions of the Netherlands – the present day border, three miles east of the Meuse, is as young as from 1815.

See the location map, placed between the lists of Münster region and of northern Rhine region.

=== East-Westphalia ===
Place	Building	main period of construction	special features	Image
Kleinendorf, Rahden	Rahden Castle	1310–1320	since winter 1878/1879 in ruins	

=== Münster region ===
Place	Building	main period of construction	special features	Image
Bocholt	St. Agnes Chapel	before 1447	bombed in WW. II, rebuilt in 1953; was temporarily the church of the evangelical parish	
Borken	Five towers of the defensive walls	14th–15th century		
Burlo, Borken	St. Mary's Church	13th–15th century	restored in 17th century; Cistercian, since 1921 Missionary Oblates'-monastery	
Coesfeld	St. Lambert Church	1473	choir & lateral gable triangles Brick Gothic	
Coesfeld	Walkenbrückentor ('Walkenbridge Gate')	1st half of 14th century	last medieval city gate	
Coesfeld	Bischofsmühle ('Bishops Mill')	12th/13th century	former defensive tower in 1248 rebuilt as a mill, no Gothic design	
Dülmen	Lüdinghauser Tor ('Lüdinghausen Gate')			
Haltern am See	Siebenteufelsturm ('Seven Devils' Tower')	1502	part of the defensive wall	
Haltern am See	Sythen Castle	1330	only the chapel building (chapel in the ground flour) Gothic, later alterations	
Lüdinghausen	Chapel of Vischering Castle	1495	outside the castle, which was rebuilt in Renaissance style after a fire in 1521	
Ottenstein, Ahaus	St. George's Church	1292 & 1521	western two bays Gothic revival (1751 & 1915; photo shows little more)	
Südlohn	St. Vitus's Church	14th/15th century	hall church	
Wüllen, Ahaus	St. Andrew's Church	nave 15th century	Romanesque stone tower, Gothic Revival transept & choir	

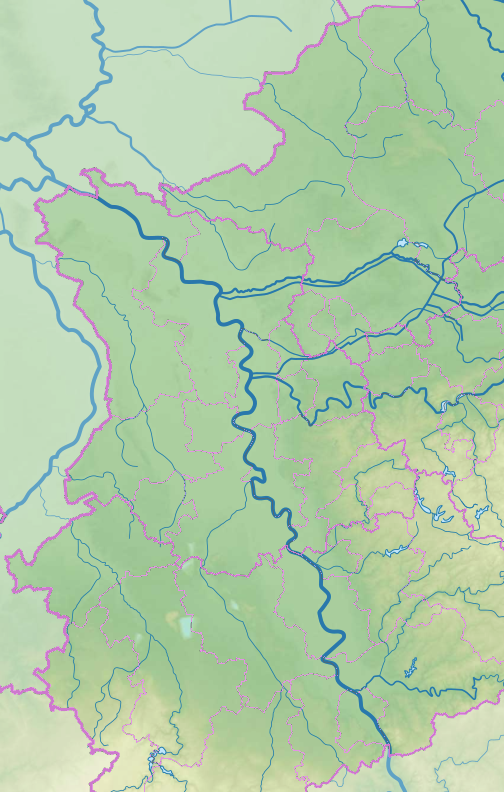
Places with Brick Gothic buildings in North Rhine-Westphalia. If possible, the label is linked to the (most important) brick building, there, otherwise to the place. If the place is a little billage and has no article, the municipality is linked. If there are Gothic brick buildings in several villages of a municipality, not all are linked.

=== Northern Rhineland ===
Place	Building	main period of construction	special features	Image
Aengenesch, Kapellen, Geldern	St. Mary Chapel	1430	enlarged & Baroque façade in 1720	
Aldekerk, Kerken	Ss. Peter and Paul Church	basically early 15th century	several changes in 1863 to 1880 in Gothic revival style	
Barmen, Jülich	St. Martin's Church	15th & 16th century	Romanesque stone church of 12th century enlarged by two Brick Gothic naves	
Bergheim	Aachener Tor ('Aachen Gate')			
Berrendorf-Wüllenrath, Elsdorf	St. Michael's Church	tower 1300 & 1467	nave replaced in the 19th century	
Bienen, Rees	Ss. Cosmas and Damian Church		upper part of the steeple Brick Gothic	
Birgden, Gangelt	St. Urban Church	tower 1480	nave replaced in 1868	
Blatzheim, Kerpen	St. Cunibert's Church	tower 1605	very late Gothic; nave replaced in 1923–1925	
Borth, Rheinberg	St. Evermarus' Church	nave 1452	stepped hall of 2 naves; modern enlargement in 1980	
Brachelen, Hückelhoven	St. Gereon's Church	choir 15th century	rest new after destruction in WW. II	
Brüggen	Brüggen Castle		altered	
Brühl south of Cologne	St. Margaret's Church	mid 14th century	basilica, end 19th century enlarged by a duplex transept	
Budberg, Rheinberg	Evangelical Church	Gothic 15th century	upper parts of the Romanesque nave and the Gothic choir of brick; upper storey of the tower of brick, middling storey a decorative mixture	
Dremmen, Heinsberg	St. Lambert Church	tower about 1500	nave replaced 1835–1852	
Düsseldorf	St. Lambert Church	1370–1394	hall church with three parallel naves & roofs, tower of tuff, founded as a collegiate church	
Düsseldorf	Church of the Order of the Holy Cross	since 1443	2-naved hall church	
Elten, Emmerich	St. Martin's Church	mid or 2nd half of 15century		
Emmerich	St. Aldegund's Church	1449–1514	pseudo-basilica	
Emmerich	St. Martin's Church	12th–15th century	losses by high waters of the Rhine, simplified reconstruction after WW. II; transept of tuff	
Erkelenz	St. Lambert Church		tower	
Erkelenz	Old Town Hall		washed brick	
Erkelenz	Erkenlenz Castle, part of the Erkelenz Town Fortification		Guelders fortification	
Eyll, Kamp-Lintfort	Church of the Assumption of Mary			
Gaesdonck, Goch	Collegiate Church			
Geilenkirchen	Trips Castle	15th century		
Geldern	St. Mary Magdalene's Church		hall church	
Geldern	Haag Castle			
Geldern	Tower of Langendonk Castle		ruin	
Glesch, Bergheim	Ss. Cosmas and Damian Church	1493 + 1553	partly several layers of bricks alternant with a layer of stone; enlarged 1553 in Gothic and in 1887 in Gothic revival style.	
Goch	St. Mary Magdalene's Church		new tower (moderately modern) after a recent collapse	
Goch	St. Johns's Convent			
Goch	Haus zu den fünf Ringen ('House of the Five Rings')			
Goch	Steintor ('Stone Gate')			
Goch	Graefenthal Monastery			
Haffen, Rees	St. Lambert Church	early 15th century		
Haldern, Rees	St. George's Church	tower 13th & 15th century	nave replaced in 1874–1876	
Hambach, Niederzier	St. Anthony's Church	1419	distinct modern enlargement in 1971/1972	
Hasselt, Bedburg-Hau	St. Stephen Chapel	tower mid 15th century	first mentioned in early 13th century; nave in 1824–1826 altered to be a primary school	
Hau, Bedburg-Hau	St. Anthony's Church	1378	Gothic Revival enlargement in 1882	
Havert, Selfkant	St. Gertrude's Church	tower 1525	nave 1863 replaced, tower heightened in 1904 and restored in 1945–1949	
Heinsberg	St. Gangulphus's Church	century	tower 19th & 20th century	
Hemmersbach, Horrem, Kerpen	St. Clement's Church	Gothic relaunch in 15th century		
Heppendorf, Elsdorf	St. Denis' Church	nave 1505	church originally Romanesque	
Hoeningen, Rommerskirchen	St. Stephen's Church	1524 older part of the southern aisle	core of the church Romanesque tuff; later enlargements in 1771 & 1864	
Huisberden, Bedburg-Hau	St. Peter's Church	end 14th century	15th century larger choir	
Issum	tower of St. Nikolai Church	15th century (?)	nave Gothic revival of 1888/1889	
Kalkar	St. Nikolai Church	15th century	only partly brick, hall church	
Kamp-Lintfort	Kamp Abbey		late Gothic, hall church	
Karken, Heinsberg	tower of the old St. Severus' Church	1561	about 1900 a new church was built on a different site	
Kaster, Bedburg near Bergheim	St. George's Church	tower 16th century	nave replaced 1783–1785	
Kerpen	St. Martin's Church	tower 1496	nave replaced after destruction in WW. II	
Kervenheim, Kevelaer	St. Anthony's Church	about 1445	lateral (1775 & 1840) and longitudinal (1888) enlargements of the nave	
Kervenheim, Kevelaer	Castle "Haus Kervendonk"	early 14th century	destructions by a fire in 1757 and WW. II	
Kirchberg, Jülich	St. Martin's Church	about 1520	about 1900 enlarged by a rectangularly attached new nave	
Kleve	Church of Saint Mary of the Immaculate Conception, also called "Unterstadtkirche"		hall church with two naves	
Kleve	Church of the Assumption of Mary			
Korschenbroich	St. Andrew's Church	tower 1504	nave of 1471 replaced in 1889	
Kranenburg	Ss. Peter and Paul Church	1406–1447	masonry of stone	
Kückhoven, Erkelenz	St. Servatius' Church	tower 1460	nave replaced in 1792 & enlarged in 1910	
Lechenich, Erftstadt	Lechenich Castle	1308	first large brick building in German Lower Rhine region	
Lindern, Geilenkirchen	St. John the Baptist's Church	consecrated in 1481	enlarged by modern addition in 1963	
Linn, Krefeld	Linn Castle		Romanesque & Gothic	
Linnich	St. Martin's Church		brick nave, older Romanesque stone tower	
Lipp, Bedburg	St. Ursula's Church	Gothic 1503	enlarged northern aisle of a Romanesque basilica, layers of brick and layers of stone	
Lobberich, Nettetal	Bocholt Castle			
Lüttingen, Xanten	St. Pantaleon's Church	nave 1473	tower of tuff, nave & older choir of brick	
Marienbaum, Xanten	Church of the Assumption of Mary	choir 1438–1441	1460 –1802 Bridgettines church; Gothic Revival tower 1898–1890	
Marienthal, Hamminkeln	Monastery Marienthal			
Mehr, Kranenburg left of the Rhine	St. Martin's Church	15th century	St Martin church	
Mehr, Rees right of the Rhine	St. Vincent Church	1447	1863–1866 addition of the sacristy and one aisle	
Mersch, Jülich	St. Agatha's Church	1463	in 1913 enlarged by a rectangularly attached new nave	
Millen, Selfkant	St. Nikolai Church	nave 1121–1162	Gothic brick tower of the Romanesque stone church	
Millingen, Rees	St. Quirinus' Church	century		
Moers	City Church	15th century	1605 reconstruction after a fire, 1655 enlarged by two lower aisles	
Nettesheim, Rommerskirchen	St. Martin's Church	1515	relics of a medieval Gothic aisle in the Gothic revival nave	
Neurath, Grevenbroich	St. Lambert Church	1554 Gothic enlargement of the Romanesque church, 1743 tower heightened, 1904 choir & sacristy added		
Neuss	Marienberg Monastery	1478	after destruction in WW. II rebuilt with simple interior	
Niederaußem, Bergheim	St. John the Baptist's Church		oldest parts Romanesque, Gothic enlargement in the 16th century, now a pseudo-basilica with three parallel ridges	
Niel, Kranenburg	St. Boniface's Church	15th century		
Nieukerk, Kerken	St. Denis' Church	1421–1453	much enlarged in Gothic style	
Oedt, Grefrath	Uda Castle		only one tower is still upright	
Paffendorf, Bergheim	St. Pancras' Church	1505	Gothic enlargement of an older church, 1860 Gothic Revival alterations	
Paffendorf, Bergheim	Paffendorf Castle	1531–1546	enlarged in 1745–1753, Gothic Revival alterations in 1861–1865	
Prummern, Geilenkirchen	St. John the Evangelist's Church	1470	2-naved hall church; after damages of WW. II reconstruction in 1962	
Quadrath-Ichendorf, Bergheim	St. Lawrence's Church	1532–1535	later enlargements	
Repelen, Rheinkamp, Moers	Village Church	brick 14th century	only upper parts of the walls of the choir of brick	
Rheidt-Hüchelhoven, Bergheim	Geretzhoven Castle	14th century	interior relaunch in the 1920s	
Rheinberg	St. Peter's Church	aisles 14th century	aisles of brick	
Schermbeck	St. George's Church	15th century	several early destructions and reconstrictions	
Schermbeck	Schermbeck Castle	13th century	several reconstructions	
Schneppenbaum, Bedburg-Hau	St. Mark's Church	"apse" about 1450	Gothic eastern wall of a centralized Romanesque stone church	
Schwanenberg, Erkelenz	Evangelical Church	1547	one of the rare Gothic churches originally built for Protestant worship	
Siersdorf, Aldenhoven	St. John the Baptist's Church	1510	2-naved hall church, nowadays red washed, 1957 modern enlargement	
Sindorf, Kerpen	St. Ulrich's Church	about 1484		
Sonsbeck	Church of St. Mary Magdalene	1431, choir 1547	tower heightened in 1892	
Spellen, Voerde	St. Peter's Church	pseudo-basilica, nave 14th century of tuff, aisles 15th century of brick		
Steinkirchen, Ophoven, Wassenberg	St. Martin's Church	tower 16th century	nave 1871	
Stommeln, Pulheim	Old St. Martin's Church	1540–1553	alternating layers of brick and stone; tower about 1100	
Straelen	Ss. Peter and Paul Church		hall church	
Süggerath, Geilenkirchen	Holy Cross Church	presbytery about 1500	else replaced in 1877	
Teveren, Geilenkirchen	St. Willibrord's Church	tower 15th century	nave replaced in 1868/1869	
Thorr, Bergheim	Römerturm ('Roman Tower')	about 1500	relic of the old parish church	
Übach, Übach-Palenberg	St. Denis' Church	tower 1581	1840 some Gothic decoration of the tower withdrawn; after WW: II modern nave	
Uedesheim, Neuss	St. Martin's Church	tower 1453 & 1661	nave modern (1959)	
Vynen, Xanten	St. Martin's Church	brick & tuff; tower 14th century, nave 2nd half of 15th century, transept G. Revival 1870		
Wachtendonk	St. Michael's Church	since 1360 or 1380		
Walbeck, Geldern	Walbeck Castle			
Walbeck, Geldern	St. Nikolai Church	15th century		
Waldfeucht	St. Lambert Church	15/16th century		
Wassenberg	St. George's Church	tower 1420	nave after destruction in WW. II modern in 1954–1956	
Wegberg	Ss. Peter and Paul Church		1856/57 enlarged in Gothic Revival style, northern aisle added	
Wardt, Xanten	St. Willibrord's Church	tower 15th century	lower parts of tuff	
Würm, Geilenkirchen	St. Gereon's Church	15th century	after destruction in WW. II, southern & eastern walls of the medieval hall church integrated in the new church of 1951/1953	
Xanten	The Gothic House	1540	Gothic & mannerist elements, brick with a bit of tuff	
Xanten	Klever Tor ("Kleve Gate")	1393	and other elements of the defensive walls	
Zons between Cologne and Düsseldorf	Friedestrom Castle	14th–16th century	various materials: boulders, regular mix of boulders and brick, pure brick, sandstone	
Zülpich	Zülpich Castle	since 1369	Electoral Cologne sovereign castle, predecessors since Roman antiquity, various demolitions and reconstructions	
Zyfflich, Kranenburg	St. Martin's Church	Romanesque stone church of 11th century enlarged in 14th century and reduced in 15th century, partly use of brick, especially on vault level		

== Baden-Württemberg ==
Place	Building	Main period of construction	Special features	Image
Ulm	Ulm Minster	1377–1543, 1844–1890	large brick walls among dominant sandstone masonry; upper section of the western tower, flying buttresses and small towers added in the 19th century	
Ulm	St. Valentine Chapel	1458		
Ulm	Town Hall	1370–1578	walls almost totally built of brick, but plastered and covered with famous frescos; gables and even eaves crowned by tracery of cubic bricks and terracotta	
Ulm	House no.3 Schwörhausgasse	1430/1431	today washed	
Ulm	Slanted House	13th/14th century	northern gable washed brick, other walls half timbered	
Ulm	Zeughaus ('arsenal')	Gothic wing 1522	in ruins since WW. II, walls today washed, predominantly brick	
Ulm	City wall with gate towers		Gänsturm ('Geese Tower'); Metzgerturm ('Butchers' Tower'); Zundeltor, a gate with the Seelturm ('Soul Tower')	

Places with Gothic brick buildings in Bavaria and Baden-Württemberg. If possible, the label is linked to the (most important) brick building, there, otherwise to the place. If the place is a little billage and has no article, the municipality is linked. If there are Gothic brick buildings in several villages of a municipality, not all are linked.

== Bavaria ==
Database information on listed cultural heritage monuments in Bavaria are available from the Bayerischer Denkmal-Atlas. The informations are presented, if you click on the building in the map. The search function of this atlas does not work by the object numbers, but by addresses. Therefore, in this list, after the number of the dossier, street names and house numbers are noted, which have to be copied into the search form, together with the place name.

Place	Building	Main period of construction	Special features	Image
Airischwand, Nandlstadt; Freising district	St. Sylvester's Church; D-1-78-144-25, Airischwand 11	15th century		
Allakofen, Elsendorf; Kelheim district	St. Xystus' Church; D-2-73-163-2, Allakofen 10	choir with tower Early Gothic, enlargement in the 15th century, nave altered to baroque and nowadays plastered		
Altmühldorf, Mühldorf am Inn	St. Lawrence's Church; D-1-83-128-193, Münchener Straße 174	1509–18	three-naved hall church	
Augsburg	Augsburg Cathedral; D-7-61-000-238, Frauentorstraße 1	brick since 1331	predecessor since the 8th century, present building from 995, partly built of Roman wall stones; "Romanesque" tower elevations not earlier than in 1487 and 1556; west choir and north aisle plastered, until the early 20th century the other parts were also plastered	
Augsburg	Discalced's Church; D-7-61-000-131, Barfüßerstraße 8	1407–1411	Romanesque precedent destroyed by fire in 1398; after WW. II only eastern part rebuilt; some windows altered to Baroque	
Augsburg	Steeple of St. Maurice's Church; D-7-61-000-728, Moritzplatz 3 without description of the tower	1494 above 1084	two additional storeys on a Romanesque tower, late Gothic tracery of preformed brick	
Augsburg	Jakobertor ('James' Gate'); D-7-7631-0525, Jakoberstraße 79	14th century		
Augsburg	Vogeltor ('Birds Gate'); D-7-61-000-1052 Am Vogeltor 2	1445		
Augsburg	Further buildings of the urban fortifications			
Dingolfing	St. John's Church; D-2-79-112-28, Pfarrplatz 9	1467–1502		
Dingolfing	Herzogsburg ('Duke's Castle'); D-2-79-112-58, Obere Stadt 15		painted but not plastered; sophisticated tracery of shaped bricks	
Dingolfing	Trinity Chapel ('Dreifaltigkeitskapelle'); D-2-79-112-29, Pfarrplatz 9a	15th century		
Dingolfing	Defensive walls D-2-79-112-1, Obere Stadt 16	13th century, strengthened in the 15th century	mainly washed brick, but towers and gates plastered	
Donauwörth	Our Lady's Minster; D-7-79-131-58, Münsterplatz 1	1444–1467	Nave nowadays outside plastered, 1577–1607 Lutheran	
Donauwörth	Defensive walls & towers D-7-79-131-1, Hadergasse 17	13th – 15th centuries		
Ebering, Steinkirchen (Erding district)	Ss. Lawrence and Stephen Church; D-1-77-138-6, Ebering 1	about 1300		no photo of the church available
Ebrantshausen, Mainburg; Kelheim district	Ss. Peter and Paul Church; D-2-73-147-21, Kirchenäcker 13	Gothic; 14th/15th century	Romanesque brick church with tower upon the choir, enlarged by a Gothic second nave, also of brick	
Eggenfelden	Ss. Nikolai and Stephen Church Church; D-2-77-116-9, Kirchenplatz 1	15th century	Stepped hall	
Eichhornseck, Tann (Rottal-Inn district)	St. Leonard's Church; D-2-77-148-1, Eichhornseck 5	core 13th/14th century, tower 2nd half of 15th century		no photo available
Erding	St. John's Church; D-1-77-117-22, Kirchgasse 8	end 14th century –1420	nave visible brick, tower plastered	
Friedberg	City fortifications D-7-71-130-1, without noted address, click north of the turn of "Friedberger Berg" street	since 1409	built as a Bavarian border stronghold	
Grasensee, Wurmannsquick (church assigned to Grasensee, actually between Martinskirchen and Grasensee) (Rottal-Inn district)	St. Coloman's Church; D-2-77-153-12, Kolomann Straße 16	2nd half of 15th century		no photo available
Bad Griesbach (Passau district)	St. Michael's Church; D-2-75-124-21, Schloßberg 11	1480		
Günzburg	Reisensburg Castle; D-7-74-135-182, Bgm.-Johann-Müller-Straße 1	donjon 14th/15th centuries	else of the castle 16th/17th centuries	
Hirschhorn, Wurmannsquick (Rottal-Inn district)	St. Rupert's Church; D-2-77-153-18, Kirchenberg 6	core 15th century	altered in 1880–1885	
Ingolstadt	Our Lady's Cathedral; D-1-61-000-224, Kreuzstraße 1	1425–1525	main parish, no cathedral	
Ingolstadt	Kreuztor ('Holy Cross Gate')} D-1-61-000-232, Kreuzstraße 13	1385		
Ingolstadt	Münzbergtor ('Münzberg Gate'); D-1-61-000-15, Am Münzbergtor 20	1390		
Kaufbeuren	St. Martin's Church; D-7-62-000-135, Kirchplatz 9	choir 1438–1443	rebuilt from a Romanesque basilica	
Kaufbeuren	Blasiusturm ('St. Blaise Tower')	1420	urban fortification tower at St. Blaise's Church; D-7-62-000-1, Blasiusberg 13	
Kempten	urban fortification tower of the castle ruin Burghalde on the similar-named hill D-7-63-000-38, Burghalde 1	1488		
Landau an der Isar	Kastenhof Landau ('bursary officer's residence'); D-2-79-122-23, Oberer Stadtplatz 20	15th–16th century	lterations in 19th and 20th centuries, whitewashed; nowadays an archeological museum	
Landsberg am Lech	Church of the Assumption of Mary; D-1-81-130-76, Georg-Hellmair-Platz 1; no notes on material	1458–1466	mainly washed, party plastered	
Landsberg am Lech	City fortifications D-1-81-130-613, without address, click on the northernmost tower	14th–16th centuries	various times enlarged, with Schmalzturm ('Lard Tower') & others, partly visible brick, partly washed, partly plastered	
Landshut	St. Martin's Church; D-2-61-000-637, Martinsfriedhof 219	1385–1500		
Landshut	St. Judoc's Church; D-2-61-000-267, Freyung 592	about 1350–1450		
Landshut	Holy Ghost Church; D-2-61-000-229, Heilig-Geist-Gasse 394	1407–1461	nowadays used as exposition hall	
Landshut	Trausnitz Castle; D-2-61-000-563, Burg Trausnitz 168	1150–1503	(late) Romanesque and Gothic; later alterations and buildings (Renaissance and Neo-Renaissance) no more by visible brick	
Landshut	City fortifications		Burghauser Tor ('Burghausen Gate') D-2-61-000-37, beside Alte Bergstraße 162; Ländtor ('Länd Gate') D-2-61-000-332, northeast of Lendtorplatz 3; 3 more towers	
Moosburg an der Isar	St. Castulus' Minster; D-1-78-143-13, Auf dem Plan 3	choir 1468	late Gothic brick choir at a Romanesque nave (plastered but also built of brick) of 12th century	
Moosvogl, Massing (Rottal-Inn district)	St. Nikolai Church; D-2-75-125-139, Moosvogl 1	2nd half of 15th century		no photo of the church available
Mühlried, Schrobenhausen	St. Ursula's Church; D-1-85-158-101, St.-Ursula-Straße 2	13th/14th century	whitewashed brick	
Munich	Frauenkirche; D-1-62-000-1808, Frauenplatz 1	1468–1488	one of the two largest hall churches and two or three second largest Gothic brick churches of the world (volume between 185,000 m³ and 190,000 m³)	
Munich	Augustinian Church; D-1-62-000-4718, Neuhauser Straße 6	13th, 14th & 15th century	1618 baroquified	
Munich	Kreuzkirche; D-1-62-000-3639, Kreuzstraße 10	consecrated in 1485	originally graveyard church of St. Peter's Church, 1620 baroquified, 1814 re-gothified	
Munich	Salvatorkirche; D-1-62-000-6044, Salvatorstraße 17	consecrated in 1494	originally graveyard church of Frauenkirche, since 1828 Greek Orthodox Church; after temporary baroquification re gothified	
Munich	Löwenturm ('Lion's Tower'); D-1-62-000-5958, Rosental 4	14th century	fortified domicile, 7 storeys	
Munich	Isartor ('Isar Gate'); D-1-62-000-6747, Tal 50	1337	originally only one tower, then surroundging fortress, in 19th century dismantled except of the towers, but afterwards restored; central tower washed, surrounding parts plastered	
Munich	Sendlinger Tor ('Sendling Gate'); D-1-62-000-6485, Sendlinger Straße 49	about 1300	alterations in 19th and early 20th century, loss of the central tower	
Neukirchen, Triftern (Rottal-Inn district)	St. John the Baptist's Church; D-2-77-149-56, Irlhamer Straße 4	tower 13th/14th century	only tower of visible brick; plastered nave of 2nd half of 15th century	
Neuötting	St. Nikolai Church; D-1-71-125-49, Ludwigstraße 14	1410–1511	Tower 1623, plastered	
Noppling, Reut	St. John the Baptist's Church; D-2-77-140-25, Dorfstraße 1	late 15th century	Gothic Revival enlargement to the west	no photo of the church available
Nuremberg	Nuremberg Castle; D-5-64-000-305, Burg 18, Kemenate		Kemenate and parts of other buildings of brick	
Nuremberg	Old Town Hall; D-5-64-000-1589, Fünferplatz 7	1332–1340	eastern gable of the southern wing (great hall): decorated gable of brick, else of the building of sandstone	
Nuremberg	Citizen's house (Bürgerhaus) at Weinmarkt 2 D-5-64-000-2099	2nd half of 15th century	Gothic brick decorated gable	
Nuremberg	Towers of the older defensive walls	mid 13th century	Laufer Schlagturm ('Lauf Gate Clock Tower'), D-5-64-000-86, Innerer Laufer Platz 3 a; Schuldturm ('Debtors' Tower'), D-5-64-000-2056, Vordere Insel Schütt 2; Weißer Turm ('White Tower'), D-5-64-000-1236, Ludwigsplatz 19	
Oberdietfurt, Massing	St. John the Baptist's Church; D-2-77-133-31, Dorfplatz 2	2nd half of 15th century	three-naved hall church	
Obermenzing, Pasing-Obermenzing, Munich	Blutenburg Castle Chapel; D-1-62-000-6226, Seldweg 15	1488		
Oberuttlau, Uttlau, Haarbach	St. Andrew's Church; D-2-75-125-91, Am Dorfplatz 4	about 1476–1478	brick wall with inclusions of boulders, Late Gothic	
Oberwittelsbach, Aichach	Mary of Victory Church; D-7-71-113-84, Nähe Kurat-Bayer-Weg	1418 & 16th century	Baroque alterations in the 17th century	
Pfaffenhofen an der Ilm	Pfänderturm ('Debtors' Tower'); D-1-86-143-122, Frauenstraße 34	about 1400	last surviving tower of the urban fortifications	
Pfarrkirchen	Ss. Simon and Jude Thaddaeus Church; D-2-77-138-30, Kirchenplatz 3	13th–15th–20th century	Late Gothic church with older predecessors, enlarged in modern style in 1971/1972	
Pischelsberg, Eggenfelden	St. Andrew's Church; D-2-77-116-86, Pischelsberg 5	1472	turret added in the 19th century	
Pürkwang, Wildenberg (Kelheim district)	St. Andrew's Church; D-2-73-181-6, Am Kirchberg 9	1462	lateral tower with blind pointed arches, nave altered in the 18th century	
Reut (Rottal-Inn district)	St. Stephen's Church; D-2-77-140-1, Simbacher Straße 1	late 15th century	enlarged in 1895	
Sankt Alban, Hörgertshausen (Freising district)	St. Alban's Church; D-1-78-132-5, Sankt Alban 13	15th century		
Schrobenhausen	City fortifications D-1-85-158-120, Am Oberen Tor 10 & else	about 1440	mostly washed brick; 12 towers	
Staudach, Massing	St. Corona's Church; D-2-77-133-37, Staudach 4	1481–1488		
Steinkirchen (Erding district)	Ss. John the Baptist and John the Evangelist Church; D-1-77-138-1, Am Kirchberg 9	2nd half of 15th century	Baroque alterations in 18th century	
Steinkirchen, Ortenburg (Passau district)	St. Lawrence's Church; D-2-75-138-137, Steinkirchen 9	1474–1478	single nave church, evangelical since 1573	
Straubing	Basilica St. James; D-2-63-000-152, Pfarrplatz 21	1400–1512		
Straubing	Church of the Carmelite Monastery; D-2-63-000-11, Albrechtsgasse 24	1368–1430	1700–1755 altered to Baroque style	
Straubing	Defensive walls D-2-63-000-1, Fürstenstraße 15 a	14th & 15th centuries	two Gothic watchtowers and parts of the walls of brick: Joseph- or Agnes-Bernauer-Turm ('Josephi Tower' or 'Agnes Bernauer Tower'); Pulverturm ('Powder Tower')	
Usterling, Landau an der Isar	St. John the Baptist's Church; D-2-79-122-74, Mamminger Straße 62	early 16th century		
Vilsbiburg	Church of the Assumption of Mary; D-2-74-184-7, Kirchstraße 13	1404–1500	tower heightened in the 17th century	
Walburgskirchen, Tann (Rottal-Inn district)	St. Walpurga's Church; D-2-77-148-48, Dorfplatz 2	2nd half of 15th century, tower about 1400	nave extended to the west in 1882	
Wasserburg am Inn	St. James' Church	15th century	only the nave of brick	
Wittibreut (Rottal-Inn district)	Ss. Mary, Philip and James Church; D-2-77-152-1, Hauptstraße 15	tower Late Gothic	only tower of visible brick	
Wolfakirchen, Haarbach	Church of the Assumption of Mary; D-2-75-125-139, Wolfakirchen 4	1502–1519	polygonal choir and western tower of brick	
Bad Wörishofen	St. Justina's Church	tower 1519/20	tower of the else plastered church	
Martinskirchen, Wurmannsquick (Rottal-Inn district)	St. Martin's Church	2nd half of 15th century	bare brick tower on the south side	photo missing, but

== Bibliography ==
- Hans Josef Böker: Die mittelalterliche Backsteinarchitektur Norddeutschlands. Darmstadt 1988. ISBN 3-534-02510-5
- Gerhard Vinken (ed.): Georg Dehio Handbuch der deutschen Kunstdenkmäler. Brandenburg. München 20o12. ISBN 3-422-03054-9 The descriptions of the single buildings are also available online from the cultural heritage database of the state of Brandenburg.
- Hans-Christian Feldmann (ed.): Handbuch der deutschen Kunstdenkmäler. Mecklenburg-Vorpommern. München 2000. ISBN 3-422-03081-6
- Johannes Habich (ed.): Georg Dehio Handbuch der deutschen Kunstdenkmäler. Hamburg und Schleswig-Holstein. München 2009. ISBN 978-3-422-03120-3
- Gerd Weiß (ed.): Georg Dehio Handbuch der deutschen Kunstdenkmäler. Bremen und Niedersachsen. München 1992. ISBN 3-422-03025-5
- Claudia Euskirchen & al.: Georg Dehio: Handbuch der deutschen Kunstdenkmäler. Nordrhein-Westfalen I. Rheinland. 2005, ISBN 978-3-422-03093-0.
- Ursula Quednau & al.: Georg Dehio: Handbuch der deutschen Kunstdenkmäler. Nordrhein-Westfalen II. Westfalen. 2016, ISBN 978-3-422-03114-2.
- Georg Dehio: Handbuch der deutschen Kunstdenkmäler. Vol. 1: Mitteldeutschland. Berlin, 1905 (digitized see digi.ub.uni-heidelberg.de Digitalisat).
- Georg Dehio: Handbuch der deutschen Kunstdenkmäler. Vol. 2: Nordostdeutschland. Berlin, 1906 (digitized see digi.ub.uni-heidelberg.de Digitalisat).
- Georg Dehio: Handbuch der deutschen Kunstdenkmäler. Vol. 5: Nordwestdeutschland. Berlin, 1912 (digitized see digi.ub.uni-heidelberg.de).

== See also ==
- List of Brick Gothic buildings
- List of Gothic brick buildings in the Netherlands
- List of Gothic brick buildings in Poland
