= Ihlow =

- Municipality
- Flag Coat of arms

- Location of Ihlow within Aurich district
- Interactive map of Ihlow
- Location within Germany Location within Lower Saxony
- Coordinates: 53°25′N 7°11′E
- Country: Germany
- State: Lower Saxony
- District: Aurich
- Subdivisions: 12 districts

Government
  - Mayor (2021–26): Arno Ulrichs (Ind.)

Area
  - Total: 123 km^{2} (47 sq mi)
- Elevation: 0 m (0 ft)

Population (2025-12-31)
  - Total: 12,305
  - Density: 100/km^{2} (259/sq mi)
- Time zone: UTC+01:00 (CET)
  - Summer (DST): UTC+02:00 (CEST)
- Postal codes: 26632
- Dialling codes: 0 49 29
- Vehicle registration: AUR
- Website: www.ihlow.de

Ihlow (East Frisian Low Saxon: Iil) is a village and a municipality in the district of Aurich, in Lower Saxony, Germany. It is situated approximately 8 km southwest of Aurich, and 15 km east of Emden.
