= Märkisch Linden =

- Municipality
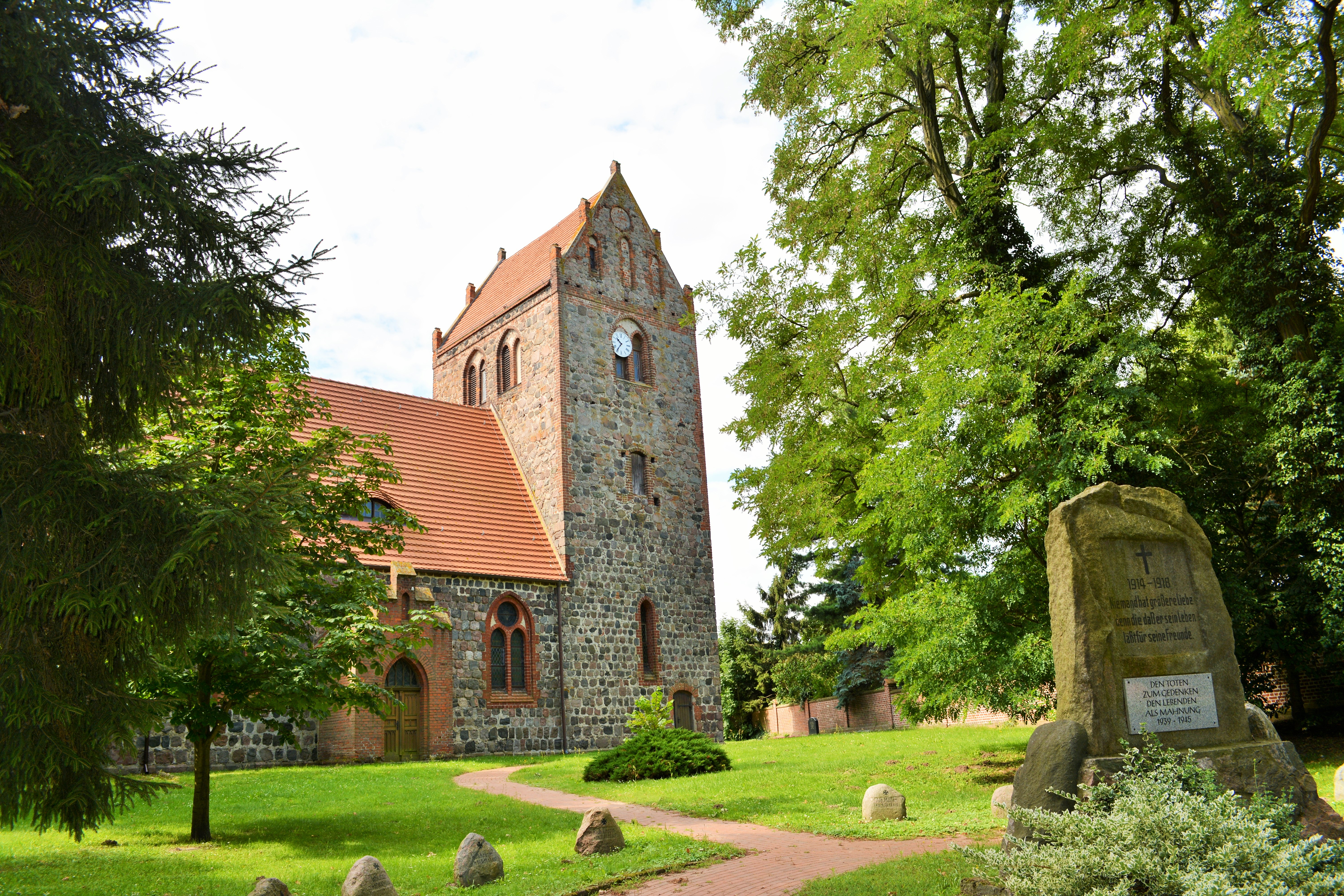
- Gottberg church

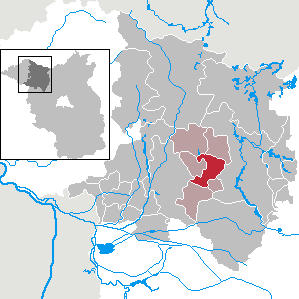
- Location of Märkisch Linden within Ostprignitz-Ruppin district
- Interactive map of Märkisch Linden
- Location within Germany Location within Brandenburg
- Coordinates: 52°55′00″N 12°41′59″E
- Country: Germany
- State: Brandenburg
- District: Ostprignitz-Ruppin
- Municipal assoc.: Temnitz

Government
  - Mayor (2024–29): Jana Schmidt

Area
  - Total: 43.92 km^{2} (16.96 sq mi)
- Elevation: 44 m (144 ft)

Population (2025-12-31)
  - Total: 1,201
  - Density: 27.35/km^{2} (70.82/sq mi)
- Time zone: UTC+01:00 (CET)
  - Summer (DST): UTC+02:00 (CEST)
- Postal codes: 16818
- Dialling codes: 033920
- Vehicle registration: OPR

Märkisch Linden is a municipality in the Ostprignitz-Ruppin district, in Brandenburg, Germany.

== History ==
From 1815 to 1945, Märkisch Linden was part of the Prussian Province of Brandenburg. From 1952 to 1990, it was part of the Bezirk Potsdam of East Germany.

== Demography ==
Development of population since 1875 within the current boundaries (Blue line: Population; Dotted line: Comparison to population development of Brandenburg state; Grey background: Time of Nazi rule; Red background: Time of communist rule)

Märkisch Linden: Population development
within the current boundaries (2013)

Year	Pop.	±% p.a.
1875	1,728	—
1890	1,716	−0.05%
1910	1,542	−0.53%
1925	1,558	+0.07%
1933	1,536	−0.18%
1939	1,454	−0.91%
1946	2,506	+8.09%
1950	2,310	−2.02%
1964	1,637	−2.43%
1971	1,533	−0.93%
1981	1,232	−2.16%
1985	1,144	−1.84%
1989	1,123	−0.46%
1990	1,100	−2.05%
1991	1,091	−0.82%
1992	1,071	−1.83%
1993	1,076	+0.47%
1994	1,092	+1.49%
1995	1,100	+0.73%
1996	1,146	+4.18%

Year	Pop.	±% p.a.
1997	1,169	+2.01%
1998	1,174	+0.43%
1999	1,189	+1.28%
2000	1,216	+2.27%
2001	1,271	+4.52%
2002	1,243	−2.20%
2003	1,247	+0.32%
2004	1,234	−1.04%
2005	1,224	−0.81%
2006	1,235	+0.90%
2007	1,237	+0.16%
2008	1,240	+0.24%
2009	1,241	+0.08%
2010	1,244	+0.24%
2011	1,188	−4.50%
2012	1,193	+0.42%
2013	1,188	−0.42%
2014	1,191	+0.25%
2015	1,178	−1.09%
2016	1,174	−0.34%
