= Satow, Germany =

Satow
- Municipality
- Coat of arms

- Location of Satow within Rostock district
- Interactive map of Satow
- Location within Germany Location within Mecklenburg-Vorpommern
- Coordinates: 53°59′N 11°54′E
- Country: Germany
- State: Mecklenburg-Vorpommern
- District: Rostock

Government
  - Mayor: Matthias Drese

Area
  - Total: 119.51 km^{2} (46.14 sq mi)
- Elevation: 18 m (59 ft)

Population (2025-12-31)
  - Total: 6,372
  - Density: 53.32/km^{2} (138.1/sq mi)
- Time zone: UTC+01:00 (CET)
  - Summer (DST): UTC+02:00 (CEST)
- Postal codes: 18239
- Dialling codes: 038295
- Vehicle registration: LRO
- Website: www.satow.de

Satow is a municipality in the Rostock district, in Mecklenburg-Vorpommern, Germany.

At 1 July 2003, the municipalities Bölkow, Hanstorf, Heiligenhagen, Radegast, Reinshagen (not to be confused with the Reinshagen of Lalendorf) and Satow of the former Amt Satow where merged to the amtsfreie (without Amt) Gemeinde Satow.

== Municipal council ==
The municipal council has 17 members. The elections held on 26 May 2019 yielded the following results:

party/candidates	seats
Christian Democratic Union	4
Social Democratic Party	3
Free Voters	3
The Left	2
Free Democratic Party	3
Alliance '90/The Greens	1
National Democratic Party	1
