= Wurmannsquick =

- Municipality
- Coat of arms

- Location of Wurmannsquick within Rottal-Inn district
- Interactive map of Wurmannsquick
- Location within Germany Location within Bavaria
- Coordinates: 48°21′N 12°47′E
- Country: Germany
- State: Bavaria
- Admin. region: Niederbayern
- District: Rottal-Inn
- Subdivisions: 7 Ortsteile

Government
  - Mayor (2020–26): Georg Thurmeier (CSU)

Area
  - Total: 49.19 km^{2} (18.99 sq mi)
- Elevation: 500 m (1,600 ft)

Population (2025-12-31)
  - Total: 3,390
  - Density: 68.9/km^{2} (178/sq mi)
- Time zone: UTC+01:00 (CET)
  - Summer (DST): UTC+02:00 (CEST)
- Postal codes: 84329
- Dialling codes: 08725
- Vehicle registration: PAN
- Website: www.wurmannsquick.de

Wurmannsquick (German pronunciation: [ˈvʊʁmansˌkvɪk]) is a municipality in the district of Rottal-Inn in Bavaria in Germany.

Wurmannsquick was first mentioned in 1220 and gained the right to hold a market ('Marktrecht') in 1312.
