= Haarbach =

- Municipality
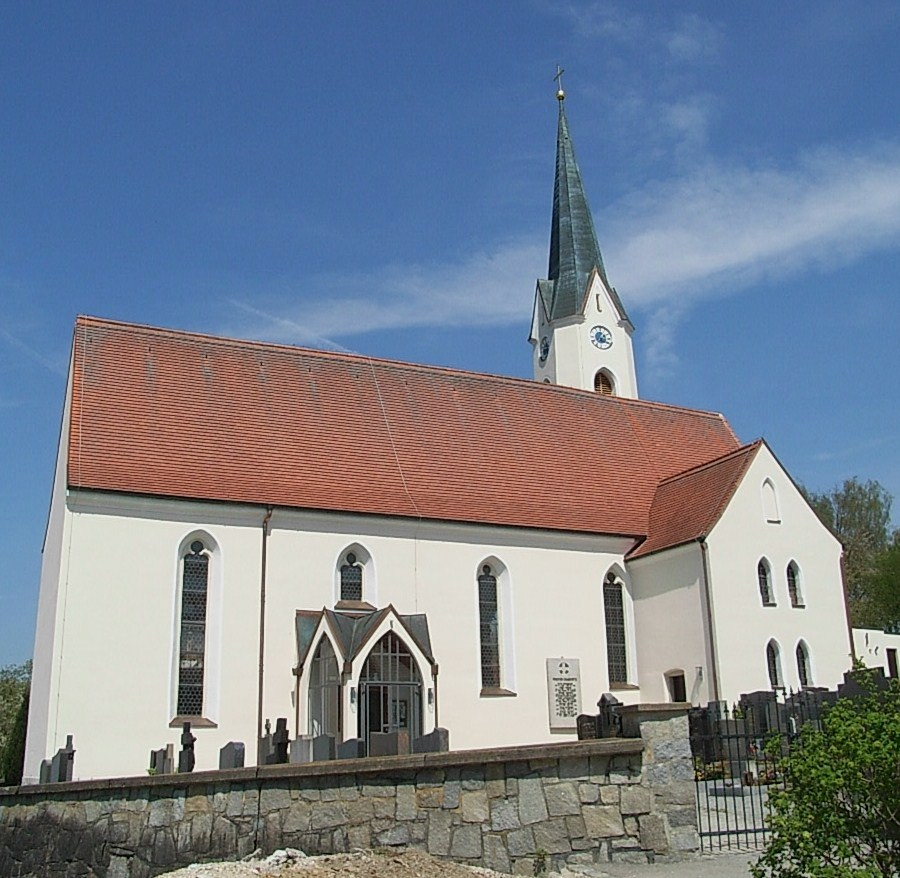
- Saint Martin Church in Haarbach

- Coat of arms

- Location of Haarbach within Passau district
- Interactive map of Haarbach
- Location within Germany Location within Bavaria
- Coordinates: 48°30′N 13°9′E
- Country: Germany
- State: Bavaria
- Admin. region: Niederbayern
- District: Passau

Government
  - Mayor (2020–26): Franz Gerleigner (CSU)

Area
  - Total: 47.71 km^{2} (18.42 sq mi)
- Elevation: 380 m (1,250 ft)

Population (2025-12-31)
  - Total: 2,485
  - Density: 52.09/km^{2} (134.9/sq mi)
- Time zone: UTC+01:00 (CET)
  - Summer (DST): UTC+02:00 (CEST)
- Postal codes: 94542
- Dialling codes: 08535
- Vehicle registration: PA
- Website: www.gemeinde-haarbach.de

Haarbach (Central Bavarian: Hoaba) is a municipality in the district of Passau in Bavaria in Germany.

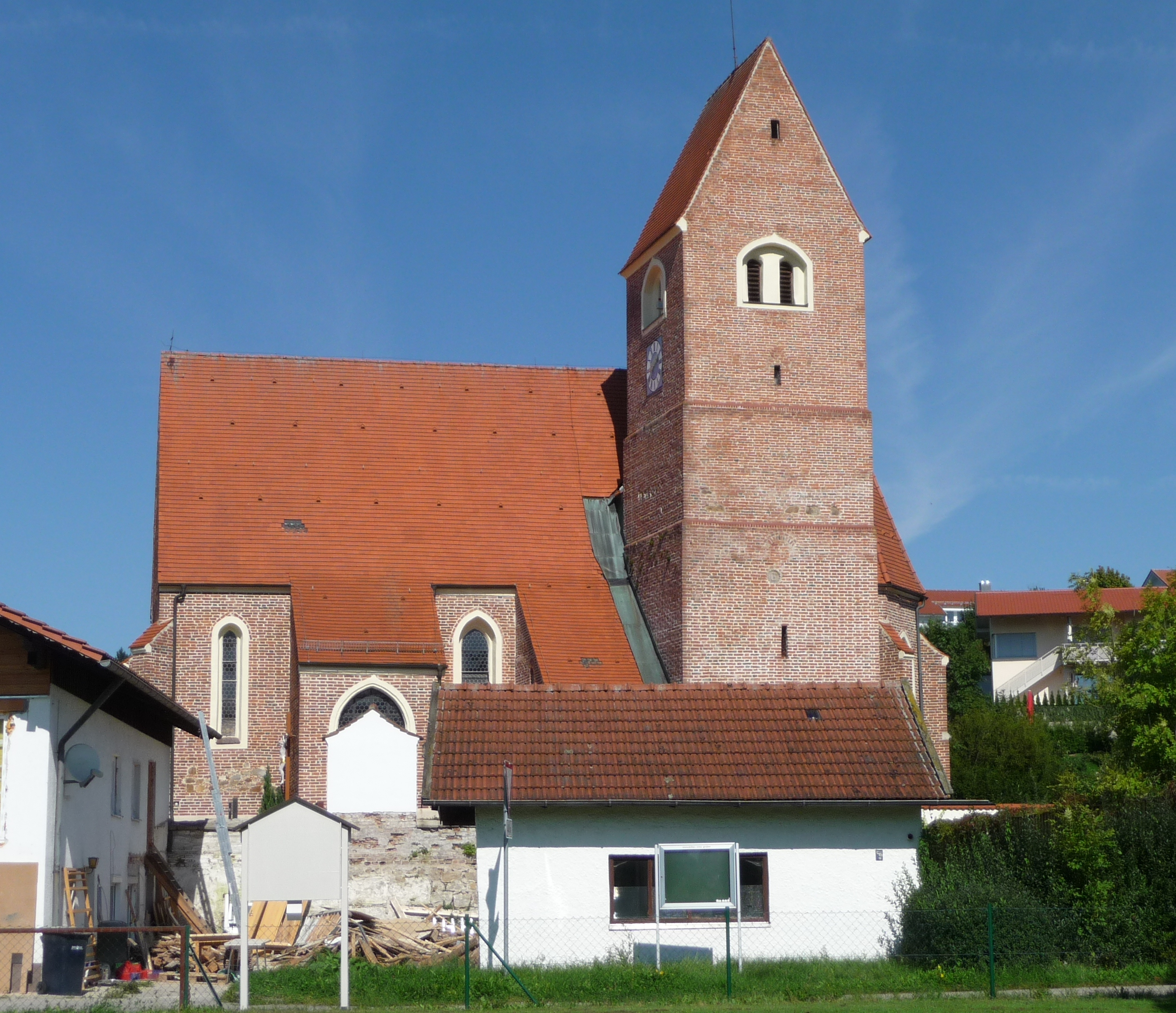
St Andrew church in Oberuttlau

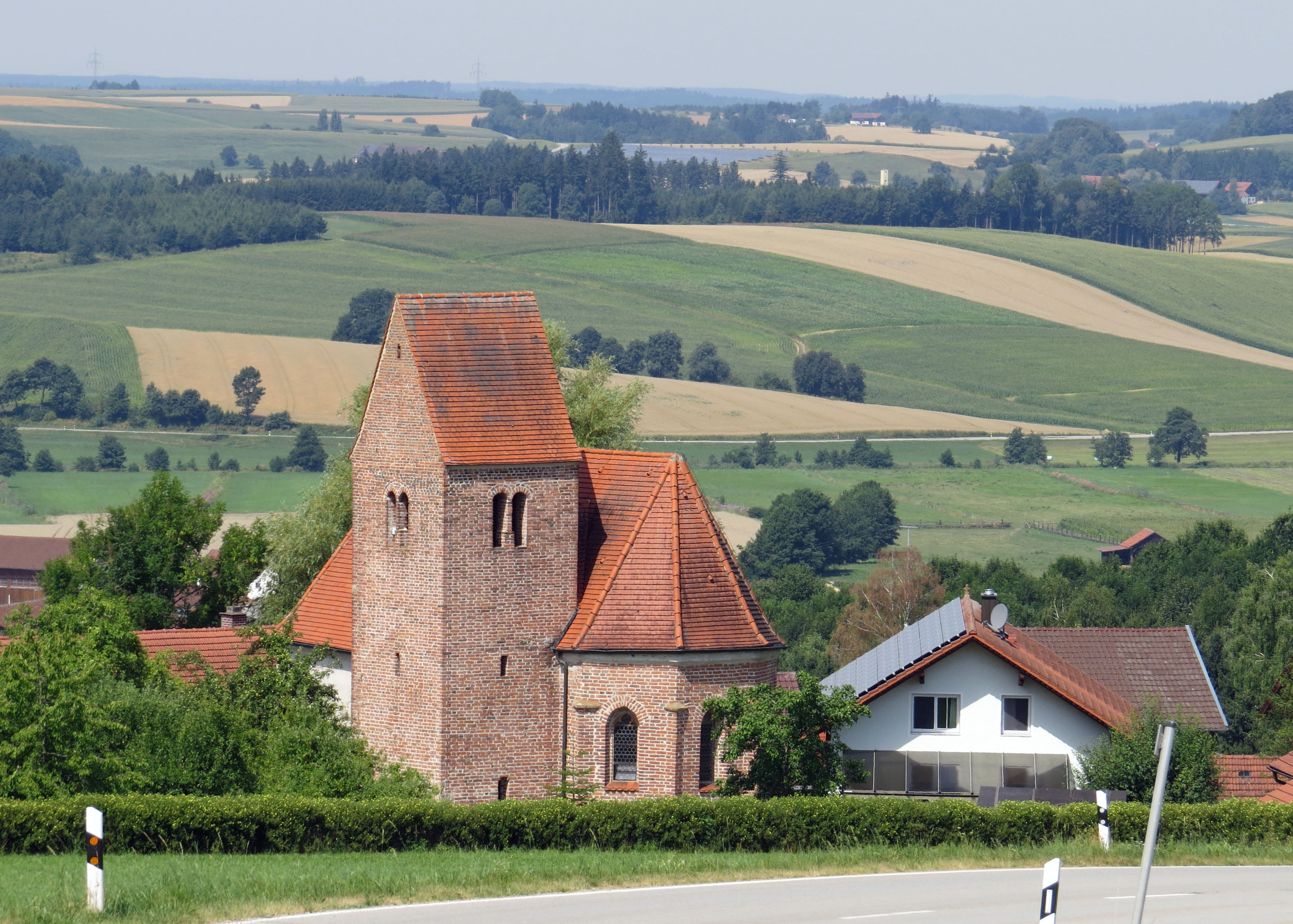
St Steven church in Bergham

== Villages of the municipality of Haarbach ==
- Anleng
- Berger
- Bergham
- Binderöd
- Brunnwies
- Churfürst
- Dobl
- Edt
- Englöd
- Eschlbach
- Freiling
- Freudenberg
- Freudenheim (post code 94501)
- Grillenöd
- Grongörgen
- Grub
- Haarbach
- Haarbacherloh
- Haarbachfeld
- Haasen
- Hacken
- Halmöd
- Hausenberg
- Hilloed
- Hitzling
- Hof
- Hofstetten
- Holzhäuser
- Hötzenham
- Kellberg
- Kemauthen
- Kleinthann
- Klobach
- Kreuzbach
- Kroißen
- Kronholz
- Kronöd
- Langdobl
- Lerchen
- Loh
- Machham
- Niederham
- Nussertsham
- Oberhörbach
- Oberndorf
- Oberthalham
- Oberthambach
- Oberuttlau
- Rainding
- Rauschöd
- Riedertsham
- Sachsenham
- Schmalzöd
- Schmelzenholzham
- Schnellertsham
- Unterhörbach
- Unterthalham
- Unterthambach
- Unteruttlau
- Wienertsham
- Wies
- Winkl
- Wolfakirchen
- Zell
