= Klein Trebbow =

- Municipality
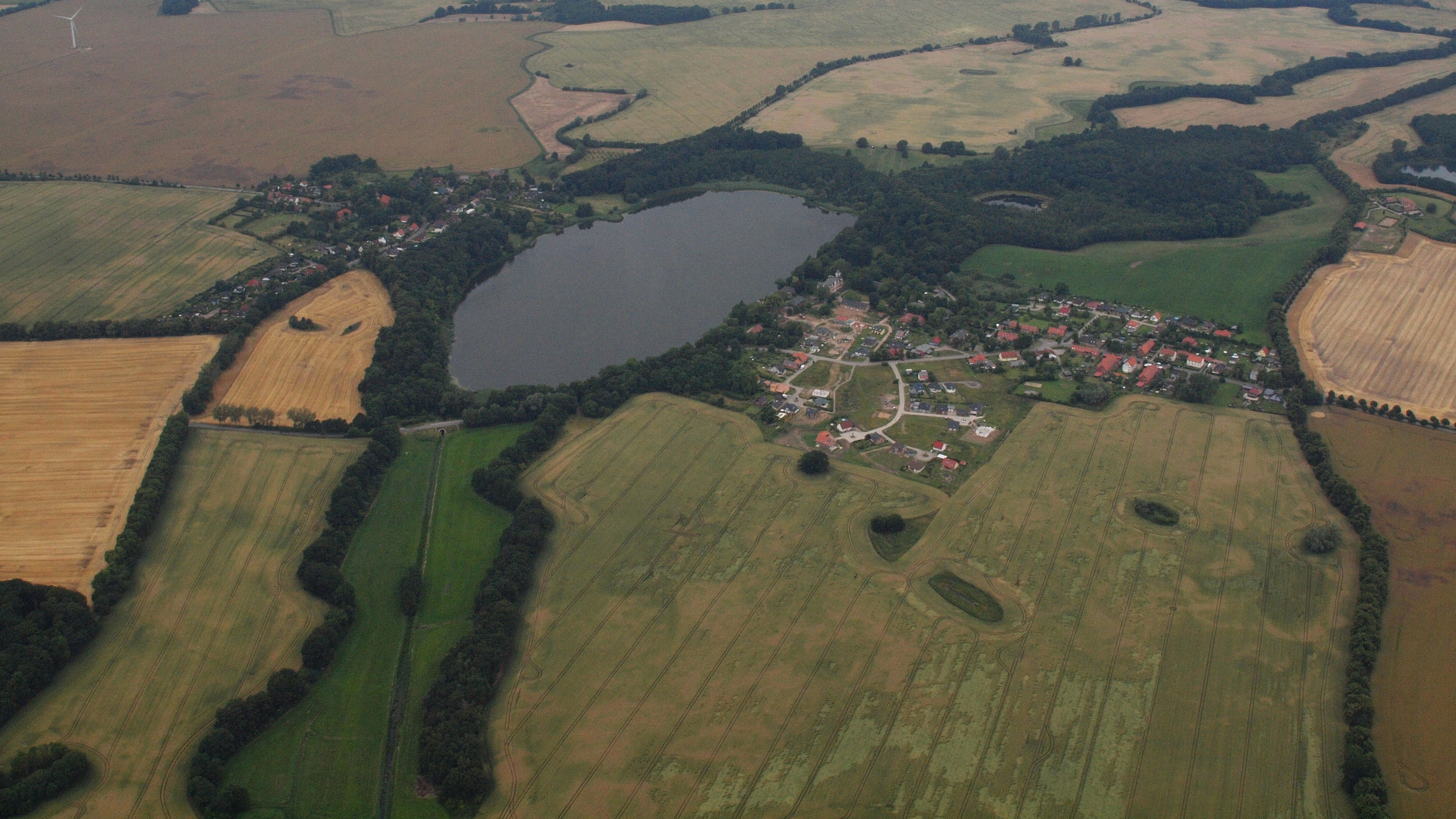
- Aerial view of Klein Trebbow

- Location of Klein Trebbow within Nordwestmecklenburg district
- Interactive map of Klein Trebbow
- Location within Germany Location within Mecklenburg-Vorpommern
- Coordinates: 53°42′N 11°22′E
- Country: Germany
- State: Mecklenburg-Vorpommern
- District: Nordwestmecklenburg
- Municipal assoc.: Lützow-Lübstorf

Government
  - Mayor: Kirsten Hahnen

Area
  - Total: 25.34 km^{2} (9.78 sq mi)
- Elevation: 48 m (157 ft)

Population (2025-12-31)
  - Total: 1,070
  - Density: 42.2/km^{2} (109/sq mi)
- Time zone: UTC+01:00 (CET)
  - Summer (DST): UTC+02:00 (CEST)
- Postal codes: 19069
- Dialling codes: 03867
- Vehicle registration: NWM

Klein Trebbow is a municipality in the Nordwestmecklenburg district, in Mecklenburg-Vorpommern, Germany.
