= Dassow =

Town in Mecklenburg-Vorpommern, Germany

- Town
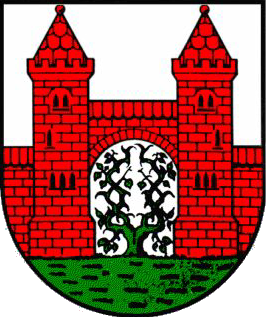
- Coat of arms

- Location of Dassow within Nordwestmecklenburg district
- Interactive map of Dassow
- Location within Germany Location within Mecklenburg-Vorpommern
- Coordinates: 53°54′38″N 10°58′20″E
- Country: Germany
- State: Mecklenburg-Vorpommern
- District: Nordwestmecklenburg
- Municipal assoc.: Schönberger Land

Government
  - Mayor: Jörg Ploen

Area
  - Total: 66.98 km^{2} (25.86 sq mi)
- Elevation: 12 m (39 ft)

Population (2025-12-31)
  - Total: 3,865
  - Density: 57.70/km^{2} (149.5/sq mi)
- Time zone: UTC+01:00 (CET)
  - Summer (DST): UTC+02:00 (CEST)
- Postal codes: 23942
- Dialling codes: 038826
- Vehicle registration: NWM
- Website: www.Stadt-Dassow.de

Dassow (German pronunciation: [ˈdasoː]) is a town in the Nordwestmecklenburg district, in Mecklenburg-Western Pomerania, Germany. It is situated on a bay of the Baltic Sea, 20 km east of Lübeck and 2 km south of Lübeck-Travemünde. It is also close to the cities of Wismar and Schwerin, and is part of the Hamburg Metropolitan Region.

Dassow has been one of the eleven municipalities and districts within the Schönberg administrative region since January 1, 2005.

It was the northernmost point of the former Inner- German Border.

== Geography ==
The Dassow metropolitan area extends from the Baltic Sea coast (between Klützer Winkel and the Priwall Peninsula) to the banks of the Pötenitzer Wiek and the Dassower See up to the delta of the Maurine which flows into the Stepenitz. The town center is at the entrance of the Stepenitz as it flows into the Dassower See, which forms a side bay of the Trave into the Baltic Sea at sea level. In the hilly area northeast of Dassow, the terrain reaches 58 m over the banks of the Dassower See and the Stepenitz, as well as parts of the coastal region, which are protected nature reserves.

Dassow is the only large settlement on the bank of the Dassower See. Schloss Lütgenhof is also situated on the banks of the Dassower See. Moritz von Paepcke designed and built this castle in 1839. Mast-Jägermeister AG converted Schloss Lütgenhof to a restaurant and hotel with 23 rooms in 1999.

== History ==
The name for Dassow, Germany is of Slavic origin. The original name was "Dartzowe" which is Slavic for thorn bush. Over the years the name changed to "Dartzow", "Darsowe", "Dassaw" and finally "Dassow". The city is probably named after the thorn bushes growing on rocky ground near the city. The city crest for Dassow, Germany is a castle gate with a thorn bush growing in it.

In the middle of the twelfth century, a German castle with a small settlement around it emerged from the formerly Slavic castle, strategically positioned on the road connecting Lübeck and Wismar.

The church of St Nicholas is built in the early Gothic style and constructed of brick, characteristic of a region without ready access to building stone. It was already included in the Ratzeburg Tithes Register (Ratzeburger Zehntregister) of 1230, at which time the parish belonged to the bishopric of Ratzeburg. The church tower is more recent, dating from the sixteenth century.

The town's commercial traditions are evidenced by a large eighteenth-century warehouse at the mouth of the Stepenitz River. Here agricultural and other produce from the surrounding area could be gathered for onward conveyance to the great port at nearby Lübeck.

More recently, as the most north westerly town in the former German Democratic Republic, Dassow found itself till 1989 at the heart of a restricted zone, accessible only to those able to obtain a special pass from the East German authorities. The town was separated by a wall from its lake during most of this period, since the lake remained administratively a part of Lübeck, within the West Germany.

The settlement of Dassow in post 1919 Germany acquired the status of a town only in the year 1938: there was, however, another Dassow to the east.

== Two north German towns with the same name in German 1720–1919 ==
Daszewo in Poland is approximately 200 miles (320 km) to the east of Dassow in Germany. Between 1720 and 1919 Daszewo was in Pomerania, a Prussian province subsequently subsumed into the German state. During these years Daszewo was usually known to English speakers as Dassow, this being its German name. Confusion may arise between these two north German settlements both called, in German, Dassow.

== City arrangement ==
Districts within the city of Dassow with its old core including Vorwerk and Siedlung are:

- Barendorf
- Benckendorf
- Feldhusen
- Flechtkrug
- Groß Voigtshagen
- Harkensee
- Holm
- Johannstorf
- Kaltenhof
- Klein Voigtshagen
- Lütgenhof
- Pötenitz
- Prieschendorf
- Rosenhagen
- Schwanbeck
- Tankenhagen
- Volkstorf
- Wieschendorf
- Wilmstorf

=== Neighboring municipalities ===
In a clockwise direction, beginning in the north, the following cities and municipalities border on Dassow: Kalkhorst, Roggenstorf, Papenhusen, Schönberg and Lübeck (Priwall, now a district within Travemünde).

== Objects of interest ==
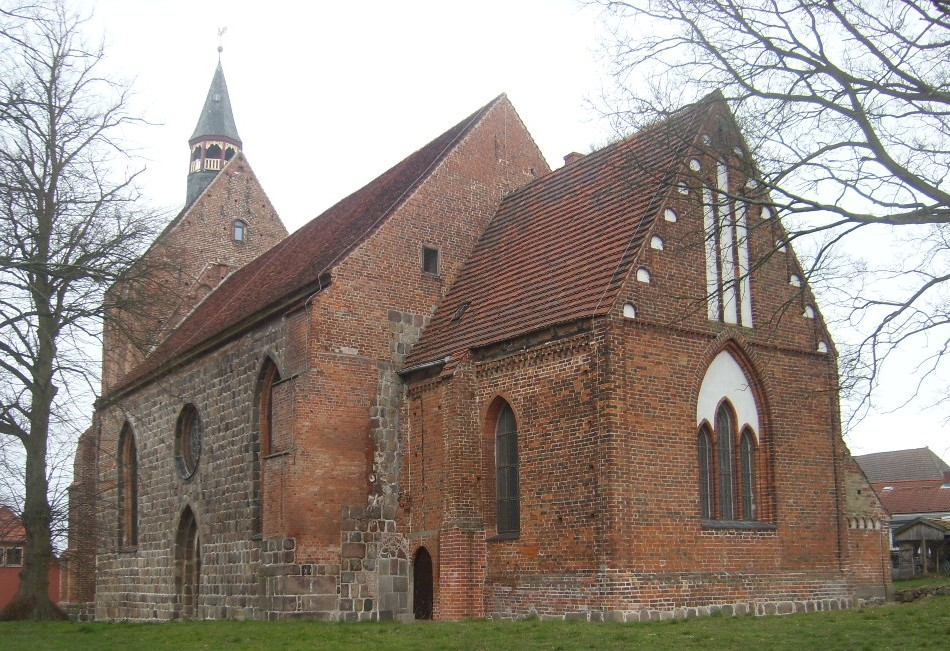
Dassow: The church in winter

- St.-Nikolai-Kirche, a Gothic brick church which dates from the second half of the 13th century
- Tiger park in the commercial area (white tiger, numerous other kinds of tigers, Alpacas and small animal)
- Monument at the old port
- The Altenteilerkate Dassow local history museum on Lübecker road
- Castle Lütgenhof (built as a manor in 1839, converted to a castle in 1890 and to a restaurant and hotel with 23 rooms in 1999.)
- Water Castle Johannstorf on the North side of the Dassower See, where the awarded movie "The white ribbon" has been recorded; burnt down 2025
- Castle Pötenitz (decayed former mansion and school adjacent to Bay of Lübeck and within sight of Travemünde)

== Economics and infrastructure ==
Dassow has today banks, medical practices, a pharmacy, kindergarten and school as well as all the necessary infrastructure facilities, which a modern town should exhibit as a center for the surrounding communities.

An extensive scheme of reconstruction for the historical old part of town has been taken in hand. Development of the town's tourism potential has also become a priority in recent years.

Over 30 companies are located in the trade area Holmer Berg, among them the Popcorn Company PCO group, that is well known in Europe, and two medical technology companies including the Euroimmun company with headquarter in Lübeck.. The PCO Group has its headquarters in Dassow with distribution throughout Europe. The PCO Group was formed January 1, 2006, as a merger of The Popcorn Company and Octagon GmbH.

=== Traffic route ===
The city of Dassow is located on Federal Highway 105 (Bundesstraße 105 Lübeck – Wismar). Important connecting roads lead to Klütz / Boltenhagen, near Schönberg and Priwall. Bundesautobahn 20 (Lübeck – Rostock) is located 12 Kilometers to the south. The next station is 7 km drive to neighboring city through Schönberg (Strecke Lübeck – Wismar). A pass connected Dassow to these cities until the end of the 1940s. Public buses connect Dassow with Grevesmühlen, Schönberg, Travemünde-Priwall and via Klütz also Boltenhagen.

== Dassow family name and related information ==
Dassow is also a family name that most likely derives from the town of Dassow, Germany. The standard pronunciation of Dassow is D AE1 S OW0.

The earliest recorded person with the last name of Dassow is Hinrich Dassow who was born about 1610 in Mecklenburg-Schwerin and died January 16, 1690, in Biestow, Germany. He married in 1640 and had five children including Hans Dassow.

There were 48 people with the last name of Dassow who migrated to the United States via ship between December 10, 1853, and April 7, 1890. They primarily departed from Hamburg, Germany and all arrived at New York City. There was also a group of people with the last name of Dassow who came to Brazil during the period of the German colonization of Southern Brazil and of the state of Rio Grande do Sul from 1830 to 1870.

According to the US Census Bureau, Dassow is the 52,272nd most popular family name (surname) in the United States with a frequency of 0.000% and a percentile is 86.286. The majority of Dassows in the United States live in Wisconsin with the largest concentration in Medford, Wisconsin. There are approximately 187 Dassow households in the United States. Outside of the United States, Germany has the largest concentration of Dassows. There are few Dassow households outside of the United States and Germany: Two in Canada, two in Australia, seven in Great Britain and an unknown number in Brazil.

There are a number of locations with the name Dassow. Trinity Lutheran Church is located at W5334 Dassow Avenue, Medford, WI 54451. There is also a Dassow Road in Medford, Wisconsin. There are a Dassow Park and Dassow Milling Company Dam in Sheboygan Falls, Wisconsin. There was a Dassow School in Livingston County, Illinois, which is in Central Illinois. St. Paul's Lutheran Church in Germanville began meeting in a building known as the Dassow School in 1879. In 1901, a new building was constructed at a cost of $1,300, on land donated by the Froedbe family. There is a Dassow Court in Alpharetta, Georgia. Erwin Geschonneck plays Luden Dassow in the movie Tambari (1977).

== Sons and daughters of the town ==
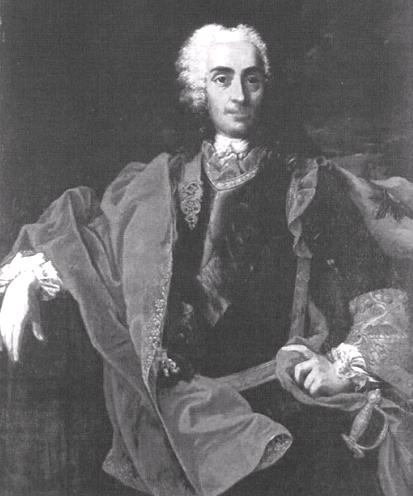
Christian August von Berkentin (around 1739)

- Christian August von Berkentin (1694-1758), diplomat in Danish service
- Meno Rettich (1839-1918), conservative Reichstag deputy
- Wilhelm Beusch (1894-1979), prosecutor in criminal proceedings against Adolf Seefeldt and from 1944 Generalstaatsanwalt of Mecklenburg
- Herbert Freitag (born 1915), Member of the Landtag (CDU)

== External links – German language ==
- (in German) Official website of Dassow City (English translation)
