= Klützer Winkel =

Coordinates: 53.9577°N 11.1223°E

The Klützer Winkel or Klützer Ort (in the vernacular also Speckwinkel) is a part of the Nordwestmecklenburg district, in Mecklenburg-Western Pomerania, Germany. It is in the western part of the district on the Baltic Sea between the Hanseatic towns of Lübeck (Priwall) and Wismar, north of Grevesmühlen and centred on Klütz. The hilly landscape of the Klützer Winkel was formed during the last ice age. Its highest points are the Hohe Schönberg, at 89 metres above mean sea level, and the Heideberg. The Klützer Winkel may also be considered a peninsula between the Bay of Lübeck and Bay of Mecklenburg, because from a line between the Dassower See and Wohlenberger Wiek it extends up to 10 km to the north. The area has a number of tourist attractions such as the Baltic Sea cliffs, the spa resort of Boltenhagen, the town of Klütz with its castle, Schloss Bothmer, and the railway museum as well as various other castles such as the castle of Gross-Schwansee, today a luxury hotel.

== Cities and municipalities ==
Cities and municipalities in the Klützer Winkel include:

- Boltenhagen (independent municipality)
- Damshagen (Klützer Winkel district)
- City Dassow (Schönberger Land district)
- Kalkhorst (Klützer Winkel district)
- City Klütz (Klützer Winkel district)
- Moor-Rolofshagen (Klützer Winkel district)
- Roggenstorf (Grevesmühlen country district)
- Warnow (Grevesmühlen country district)
