= Dassower See =

Bay in Germany

Dassower See Lake Dassow Dassow Bay
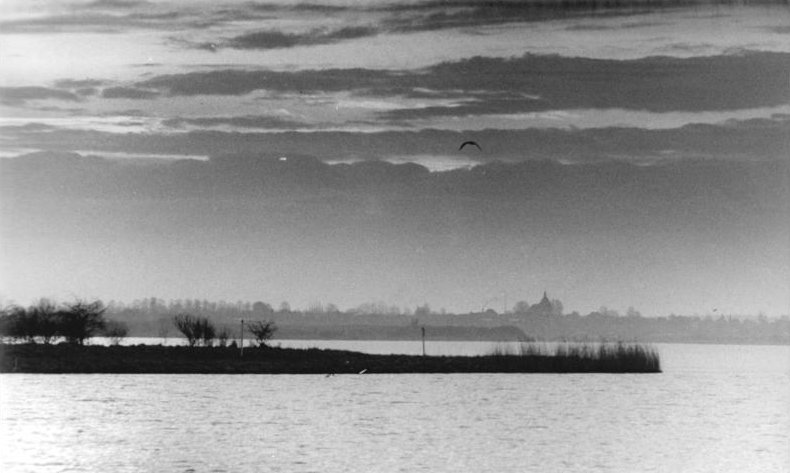
- View of the lake in 1990.

- Location within Schleswig-Holstein
- Location: Northeast of Lübeck (Schleswig-Holstein)
- Coordinates: 53°54′N 10°55′E
- Primary inflows: Stepenitz
- Primary outflows: Trave
- Basin countries: Germany
- Max. length: 8 km (5 mi)
- Surface area: 8 km^{2} (3.1 mi^{2})
- Settlements: Dassow

Despite its name, the Dassower See (German pronunciation), sometimes called Lake Dassow or Dassow Bay in English, is not a lake, but a side bay, locally known as a wiek, of the Trave Fjord, northeast of Lübeck (Schleswig-Holstein) on the Baltic Sea.

== Geography ==
The town of Dassow in the district Nordwestmecklenburg is the only large settlement on the shores of the bay. The Dassower See is a saltwater bay, which together with the Pötenitzer Wiek is almost fully cut off from the open sea and the Bay of Lübeck by the Priwall Peninsula. The bay is approximately 8-square-kilometre (3 sq mi) in area and has a funnel-like shape extending outwards from the mouth of the River Stepenitz in the southeast and narrowing again in the northwest where it enters the Pötenitzer Wiek, an eastern bay of the lower Trave, to approximately 300 metres (980 ft). At the mouth of the Stepenitz, near the Dassow Bridge, is a small landing stage for fishing boats from Dassow.

The bay belongs to the city of Lübeck, and its entire shoreline forms part of the western border of Mecklenburg-Western Pomerania.

== Flora and fauna ==
As home to approximately 30 kinds of duck, the Dassower See is one of the largest bird reserves in Germany. The lake provides refuge and is also an important migration and wintering area for Nordic water fowl that shelter on its two islands of grass and reeds. The entire shore of the Dassower See and the bay itself have been protected by the European Union since 1983.

== History ==
Tourism and land development was not permitted until German reunification as the entire lakeshore range was a restricted area. The GDR had erected a wall, several metres high, along the shore, so the lake could not be seen from East Germany. Entering the prohibited area was possible only with special permission. The border runs along the flood line, so that during normal water levels a narrow strip along the bank belongs to Schleswig-Holstein which was part of the Federal Republic. Thus, boats could ply the Trave delta without hindrance.

== Sights ==
The castle of Schloss Lütgenhof is situated on the shore of the Dassower See. Moritz von Paepcke designed and built this castle in 1839. Mast-Jägermeister AG converted Schloss Lütgenhof to a restaurant and hotel with twenty-three rooms in 1999.

== Literature ==
- Manfred Diehl, Dorothea Diehl: Naturschutzgebiete an der Ostseeküste Schleswig-Holsteins. In: Berichte des Vereins „Natur und Heimat“ und des Naturhistorischen Museums zu Lübeck. (Protected Areas of the Baltic Sea Coast of Schleswig-Holstein. In: Reports of the Association "Nature and Homeland" and the Nature-Historical Museum to Lübeck.) Heft (Number) 19/20, 1986, ISSN 0067-5806
