= Norderbeste =

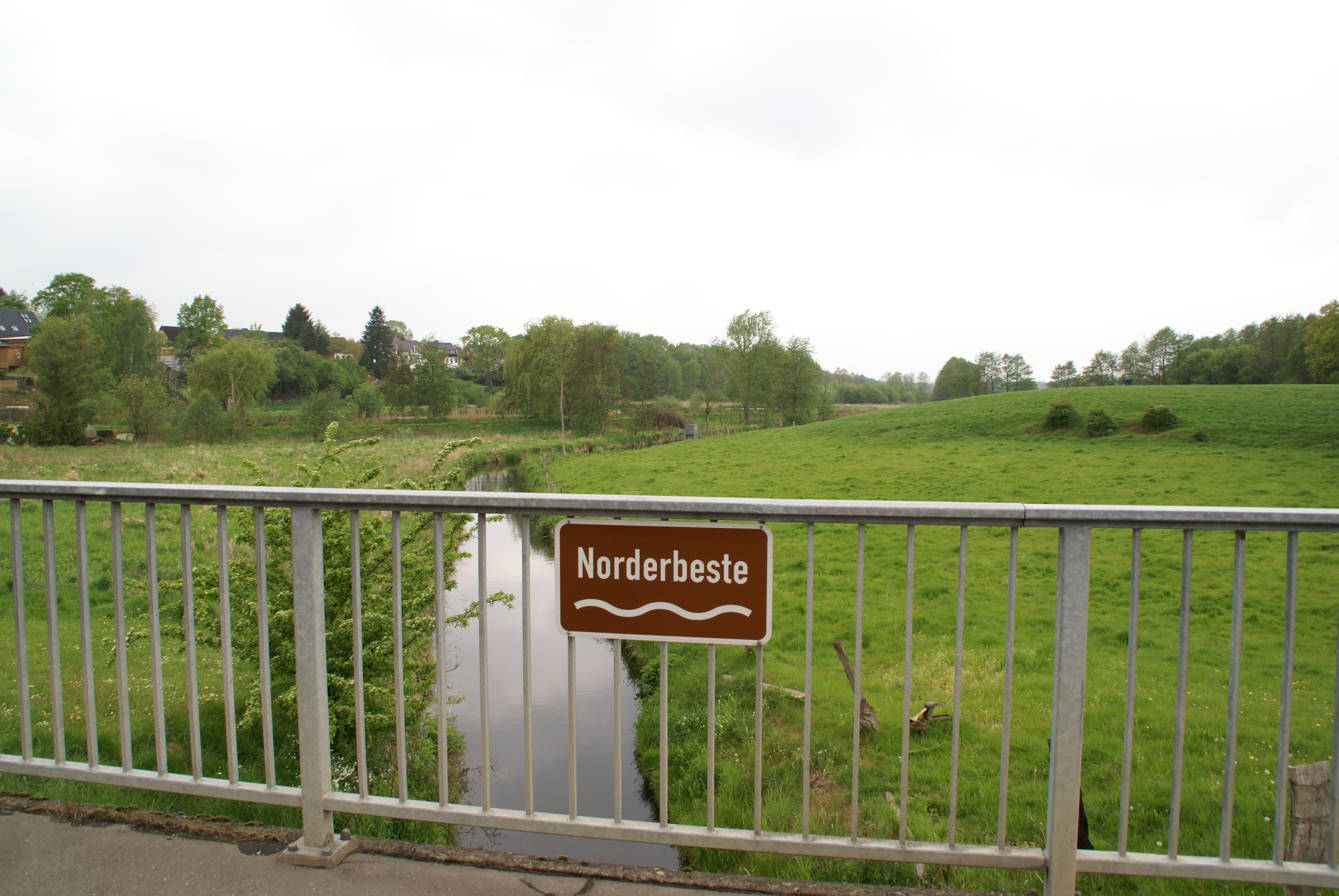

Location
- Country: Germany
- States: Schleswig-Holstein

Physical characteristics
- Mouth
  - location: Beste
  - coordinates: 53.7869°N 10.3215°E

Basin features
- Progression: Beste→ Trave→ Baltic Sea

Norderbeste is a river of Schleswig-Holstein, Germany. It flows into the Beste southwest of Bad Oldesloe.

== See also ==
- List of rivers of Schleswig-Holstein
