= Barnitz =

Barnitz may refer to:

== Places ==
- Barnitz, Germany, a municipality in Schleswig-Holstein, Germany
- Barnitz (river), a river in Schleswig-Holstein, Germany
- Barnitz, Pennsylvania, a place in Cumberland County, Pennsylvania, USA (see list of places in Pennsylvania: B)

== People ==
- Charles Augustus Barnitz (1780–1850), member of the U.S. House of Representatives from Pennsylvania
- David Park Barnitz (1878–1901), American poet
- Frank Barnitz (born 1968), Missouri farmer and former Democratic member of the Missouri State Senate
- Richard Bronaugh Barnitz (1891–1960), lieutenant colonel in the US Army and the manager of the Los Angeles Airport
- John Leonard Barnitz (November 24, 1677-November 19, 1749), Established the first commercial brewery in Baltimore, MD. Circa 1748
