= Theapolis =

Commercial employment website

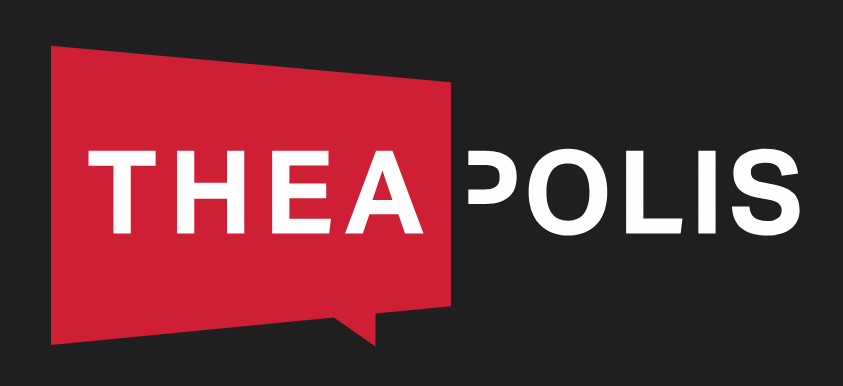
- Former name: theaterjobs.de
- Available in: German, English, French
- Founded: 2000
- Headquarters: Feldhusen, Dassow, Germany
- Owners: Theapolis GmbH & Co. KG
- Founder: Sören Fenner
- Editor: Karen Suender
- Services: Employment website for theater related jobs
- Website: https://www.theapolis.de/
- Commercial: Yes
- Registration: Required

Theapolis (blend word composed of "theater" and "polis"; pronunciation: [teˈaːpolɪs]) is a commercial employment website specialising in theater and orchestra related job offers in the German Sprachraum. It is based in the Feldhusen district in Dassow, Germany.

== Overview ==
Registered users can create a profile and publish their participation in productions free of charge. Additional functions such as making ones profile findable in internet searches, or the use of the website's database functions are available with a paid subscription. The website's managing director is the event manager Janine Thoenelt, responsible for editorial content is the actress Karen Suender, who also publishes interviews on the topic of unsolicited applications at German-speaking municipal theatres, Landestheaters, and state theaters in a PDF application guide for actors and singers called KIBA (short for "Künstlerischer Initiativ Bewerbungs Almanach," artistic initiative application almanach).

== History ==
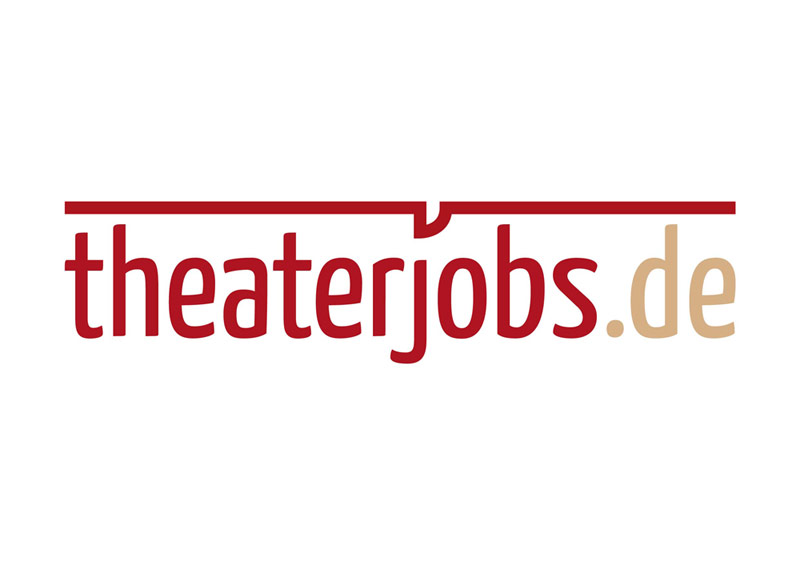
Theaterjobs.de logo

The website was launched as theaterjobs.de in the year 2000, two years after actor Sören Fenner had the idea to compile audition opportunities and theater related job offers on a website. Advertising job vacancies was free of charge for theaters; the website was financed by annual contributions from jobseekers. The theaterojbs.de website offered a job market as alternative to the ones in Trade magazine, to the Bundesagentur für Arbeit (the German federal employment agency), or to personal contacts.

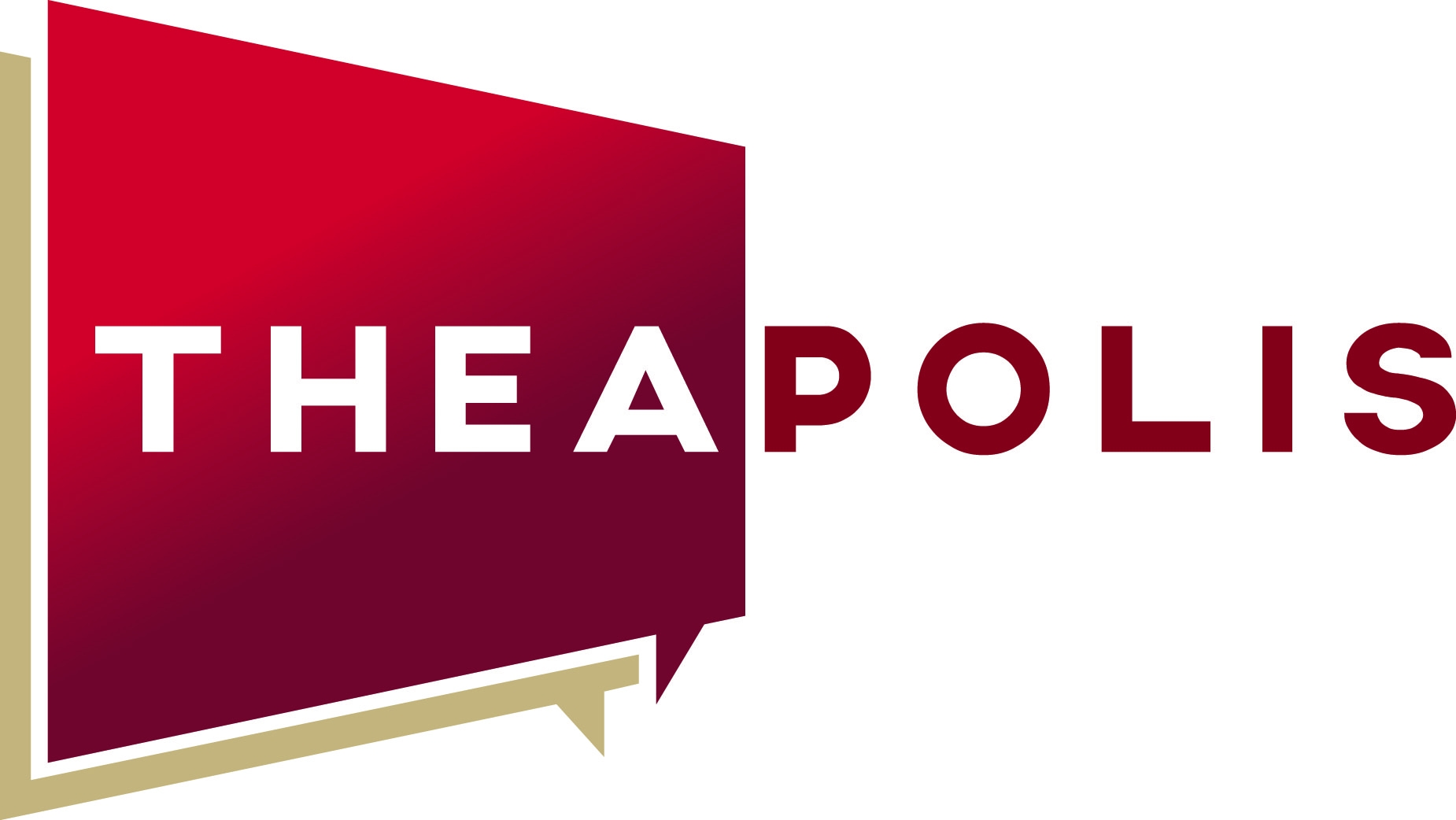
Logo after the name change

In 2016, theaterjobs.de was renamed Theapolis, with the offers, services, job market and internet forum remaining unchanged for the time being. The site was redesigned in 2018 and given the motto Theater bist Du (theater is you). The forum and the Marktplatz service market were closed, which was commented on negatively by users. In 2022 a collaboration with competing employment website Crew United specializing in film and tv jobs enabled users of both products to automatically merge data from the respective profiles.

== Reach ==
In 2009, theaterjobs.de claimed to be the largest theater job market in the German-speaking world with more than 1100 job offers. It was included by the Career Center of the Hochschule für Musik und Theater Hamburg in a list of contact points for job-seeking actors, singers and musicians in 2011. In the same year, the website had 700 job offers per month, and around 2,700 job seeker profiles. These could be linked to several fields of work at once, and numbered around 1,750 entries for stage actors, 1,150 for music theater, and around 300 for dance. When the site was renamed Theapolis in 2016 it had 4,673 profiles, of which 3,140 where linked to stage acting, 2,140 to musical theater and 685 to dance.

In 2024, the number of so called Theaterleute (theater people) had grown to around 5,700 profiles, with over 4,100 entries for drama, more than 2,500 for music theater and over 1,000 in dance.

In comparison, in the same year the ZAV-Künstlervermittlung (the central international and specialist placement service of the Bundesagentur für Arbeit) listed set cards for around 4,700 stage actors and around 3,000 for film and television actors. The reach of the Theapolis newsletter was quoted to advertising customers as 19,500 recipients.
