= Pötenitzer Wiek =

Coordinates: 53.947°N 10.896°E

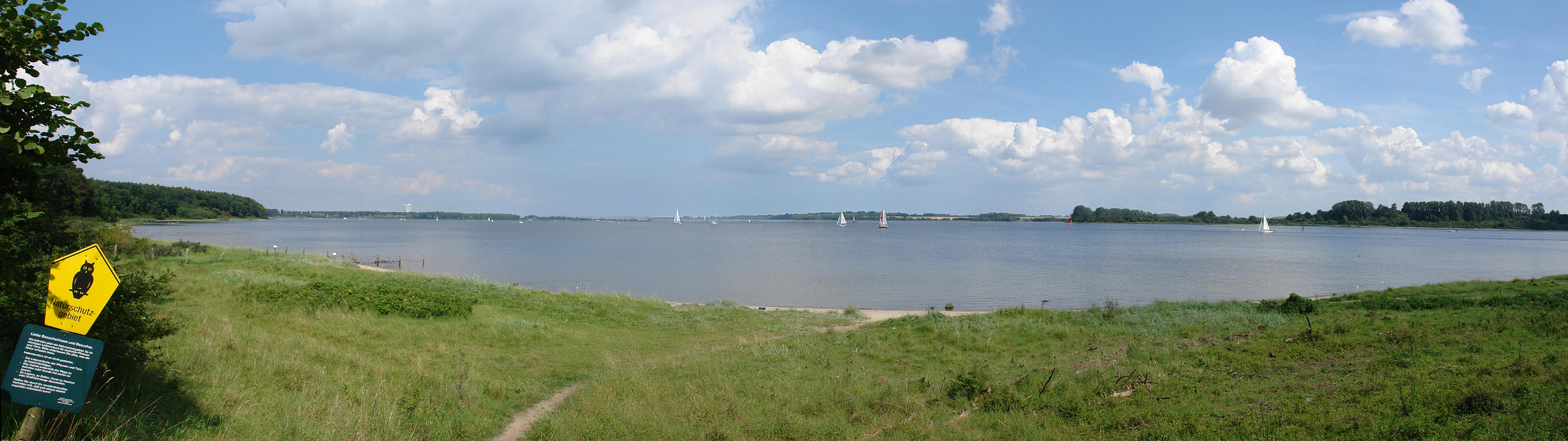
Pötenitzer Wiek seen from the northern banks of river Trave

The Pötenitzer Wiek (also called Traveförde) is an eastern bay of the lower Trave east of the Priwall Peninsula, Germany. The Priwall Peninsula almost fully cut off the Dassower See, a saltwater bay, and the Pötenitzer Wiek, from the open sea and the Bay of Lübeck.

The Pötenitzer Wiek bay is in Schleswig-Holstein while the bank partly forms the border with Mecklenburg-Vorpommern. Until the Second World War, the Pötenitzer Wiek was a take-off and landing location for domestic seaplanes and functioned as the airport at that time for the Priwall airbase Luftwaffe. The name is due to the Mecklenburgian locality of Pötenitz, which belonged to the town of Dassow.
