= Roggenstorf =

- Municipality
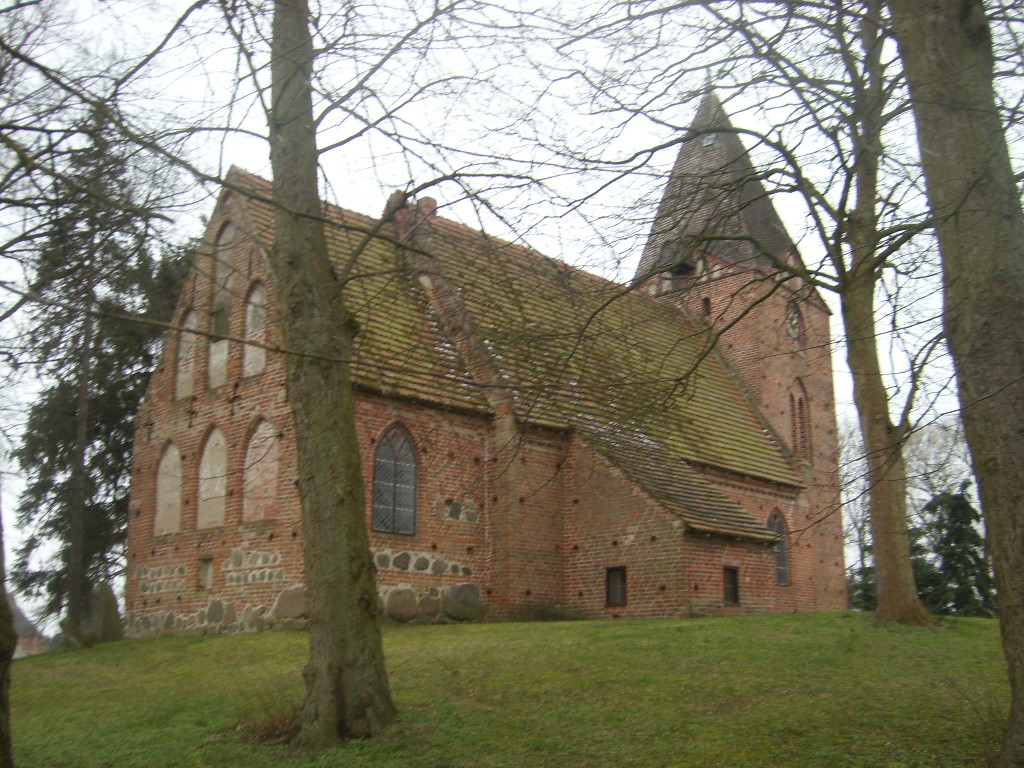
- Medieval church in Roggenstorf

- Coat of arms

- Location of Roggenstorf within Nordwestmecklenburg district
- Interactive map of Roggenstorf
- Location within Germany Location within Mecklenburg-Vorpommern
- Coordinates: 53°55′N 11°04′E
- Country: Germany
- State: Mecklenburg-Vorpommern
- District: Nordwestmecklenburg
- Municipal assoc.: Grevesmühlen-Land

Government
  - Mayor: Ernst-August Wille

Area
  - Total: 19.88 km^{2} (7.68 sq mi)
- Elevation: 30 m (98 ft)

Population (2025-12-31)
  - Total: 447
  - Density: 22.5/km^{2} (58.2/sq mi)
- Time zone: UTC+01:00 (CET)
  - Summer (DST): UTC+02:00 (CEST)
- Postal codes: 23936
- Dialling codes: 038824
- Vehicle registration: NWM
- Website: www.grevesmuehlen.de

Roggenstorf is a municipality in the Nordwestmecklenburg district, in Mecklenburg-Vorpommern, Germany.

It is close to the cities of Lübeck, Wismar and Schwerin and is part of the Hamburg Metropolitan Region.
