= Beste (river) =

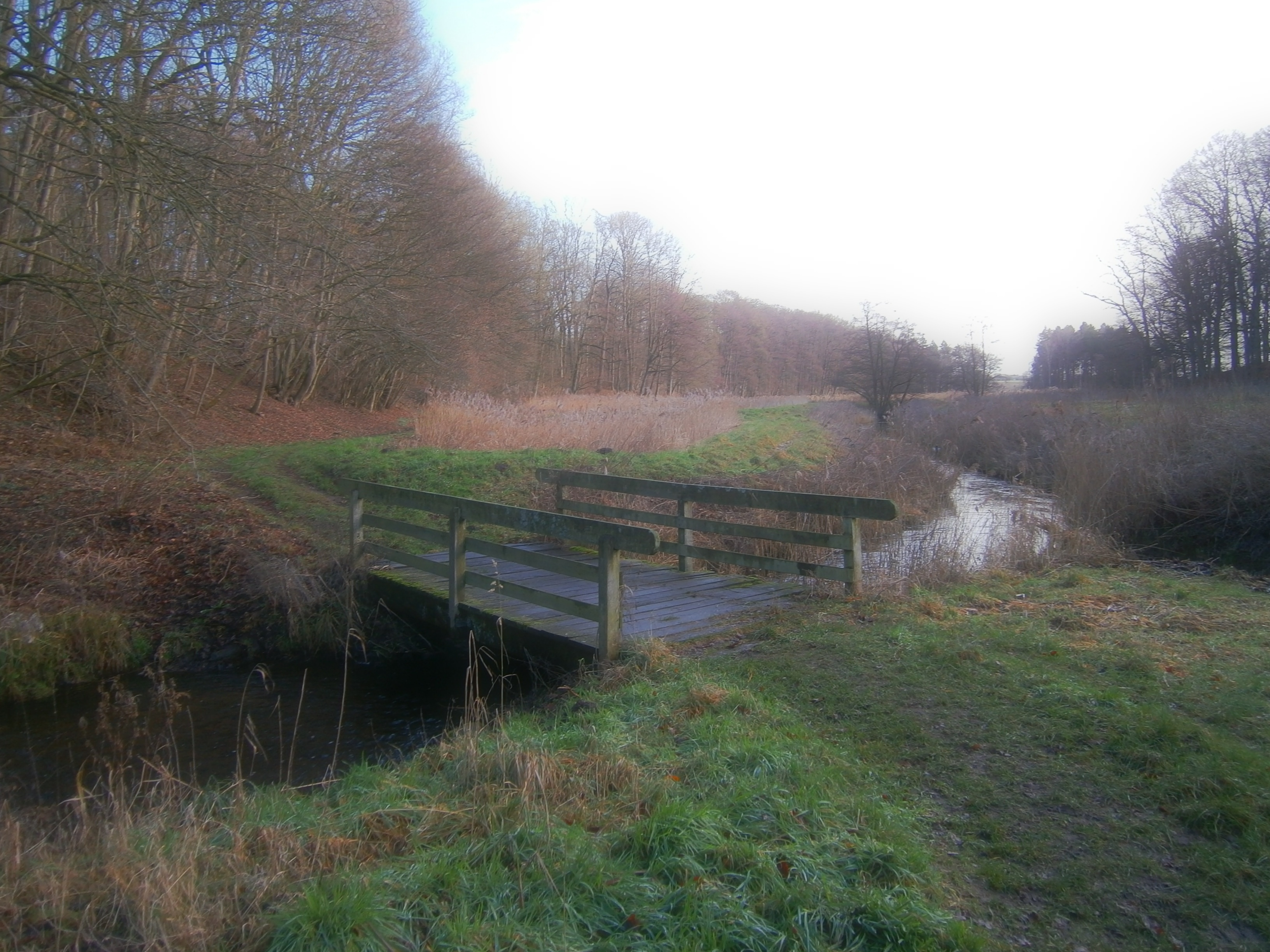

Location
- Country: Germany
- State: Schleswig-Holstein

Physical characteristics
- Mouth
  - location: Trave
  - coordinates: 53.8095°N 10.3774°E

Basin features
- Progression: Trave→ Baltic Sea

Beste is a river of Schleswig-Holstein, Germany. It flows into the Trave in Bad Oldesloe.

== See also ==
- List of rivers of Schleswig-Holstein
