= Travemünde =

Borough of Lübeck, Germany

Coordinates: 53°58′N 10°52′E

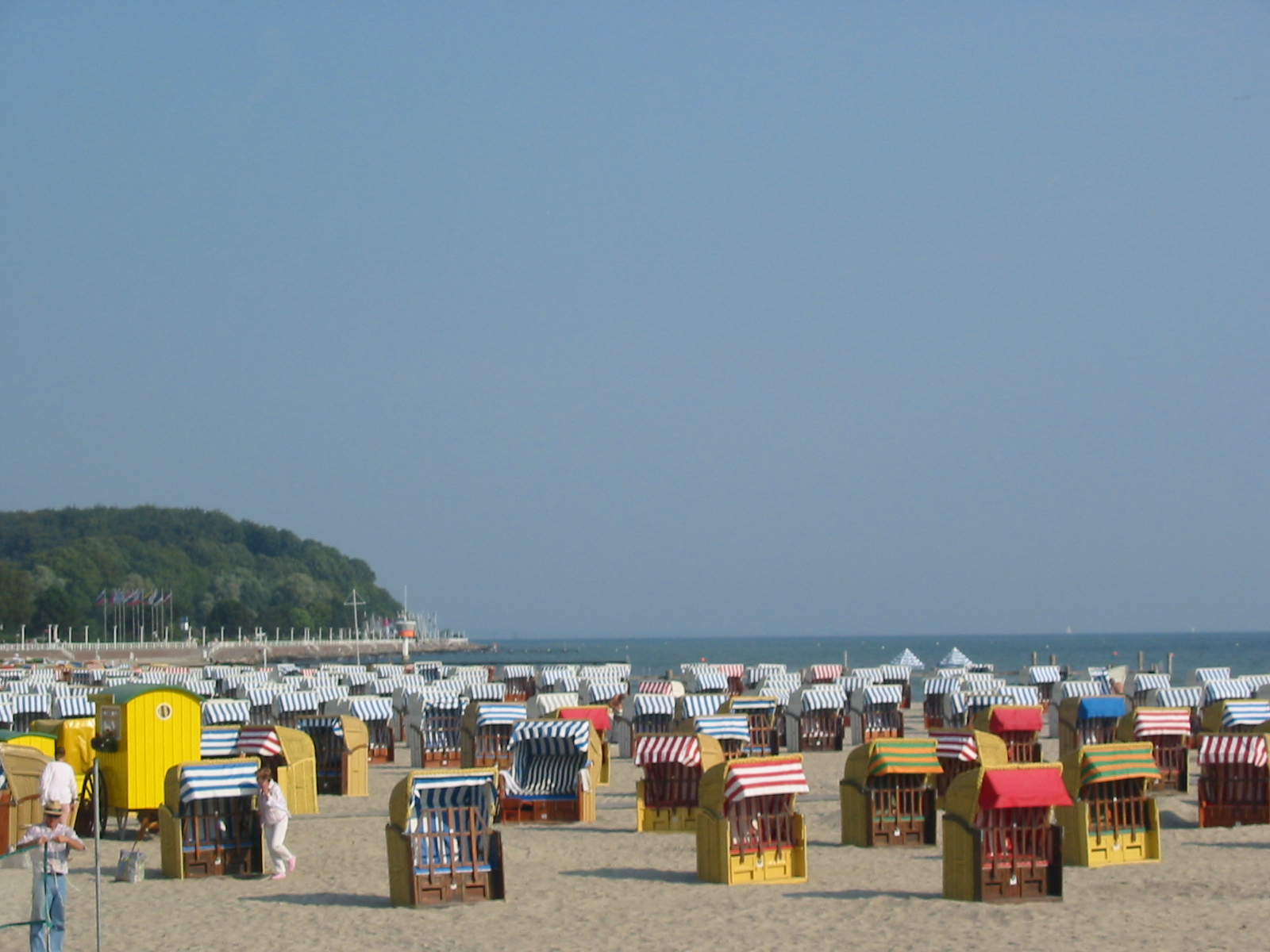
Travemünde beach, showing its characteristic roofed wicker beach chairs (Strandkorb in German)

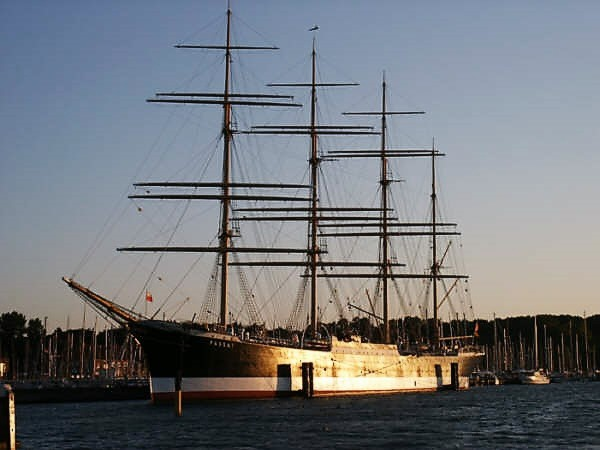
Barque Passat in Travemünde

Travemünde (German: [tʁaːvəˈmʏndə]) is a borough of Lübeck, Germany, located at the mouth of the river Trave in Lübeck Bay. It began life as a fortress built by Henry the Lion, Duke of Saxony, in the 12th century to guard the mouth of the Trave, and the Danes subsequently strengthened it. It became a town in 1317 and in 1329 passed into the possession of the free city of Lübeck, to which it has since belonged. Its fortifications were demolished in 1807.

Travemünde has been a seaside resort since 1802, and is Germany's largest ferry port on the Baltic Sea with connections to Sweden, Finland, Russia, Latvia and Estonia. The lighthouse is the oldest on the German Baltic coast, dating from 1539. Another attraction of Travemünde is the Flying P-Liner Passat, a museum ship anchored in the mouth of the Trave.

The annual Travemünder Woche is a traditional sailing race week in Northern Europe. The annual Sand festival in Travemünde is known as the Sand World.

== Literature ==
The 19th century seaside resort was evoked by Thomas Mann in Buddenbrooks. In Part II/5-12 the vacation of Antonie Buddenbrook is told, while in Part X/3 one summer of little Hanno. Travemünde is depicted by Mann as a place of freedom, happiness and – in the case of Antonie – love, in contrast with the problems of everyday life.

== Photo gallery ==
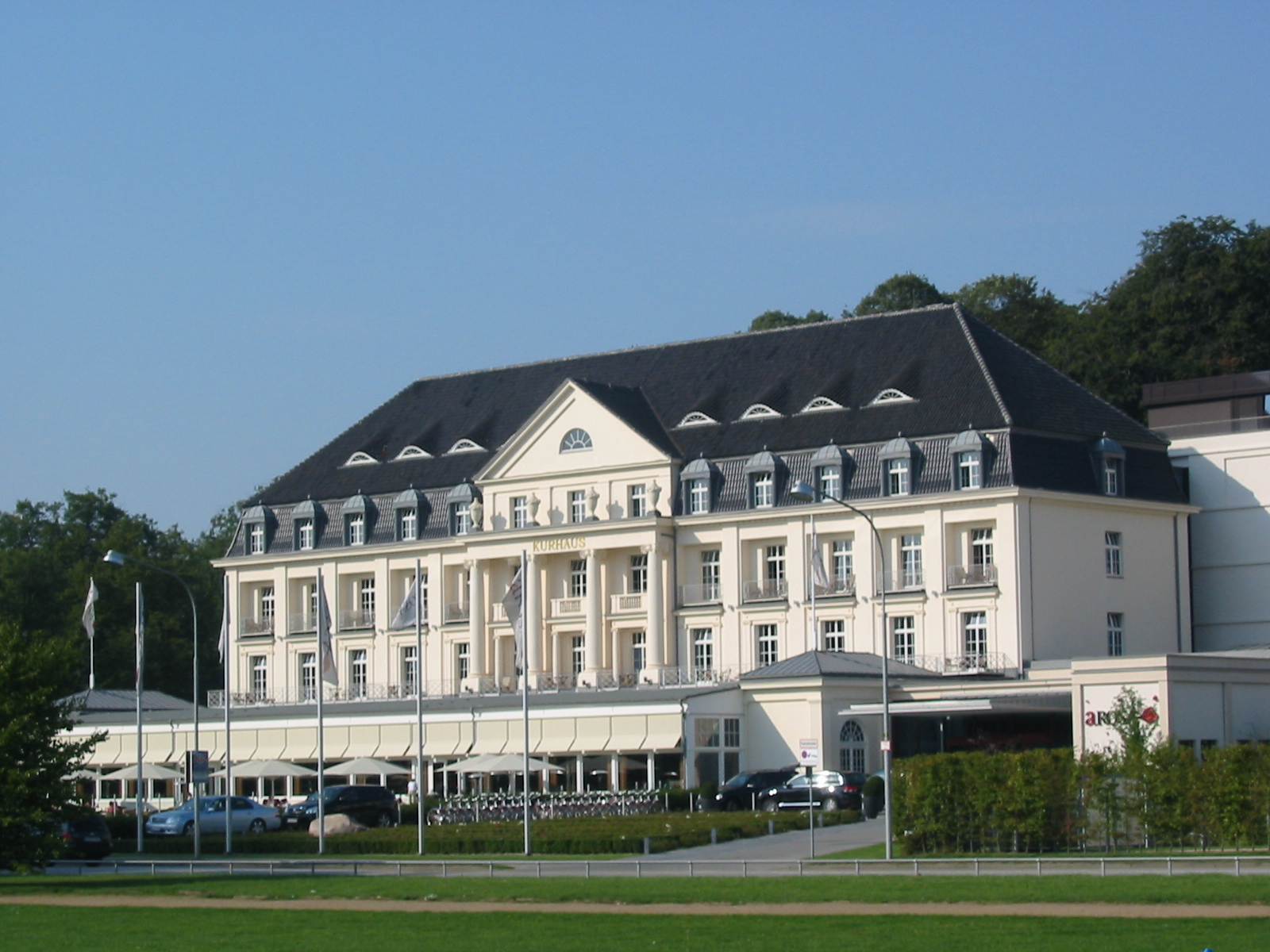
Kurhaus hotel, designed by architect Joseph Christian Lillie

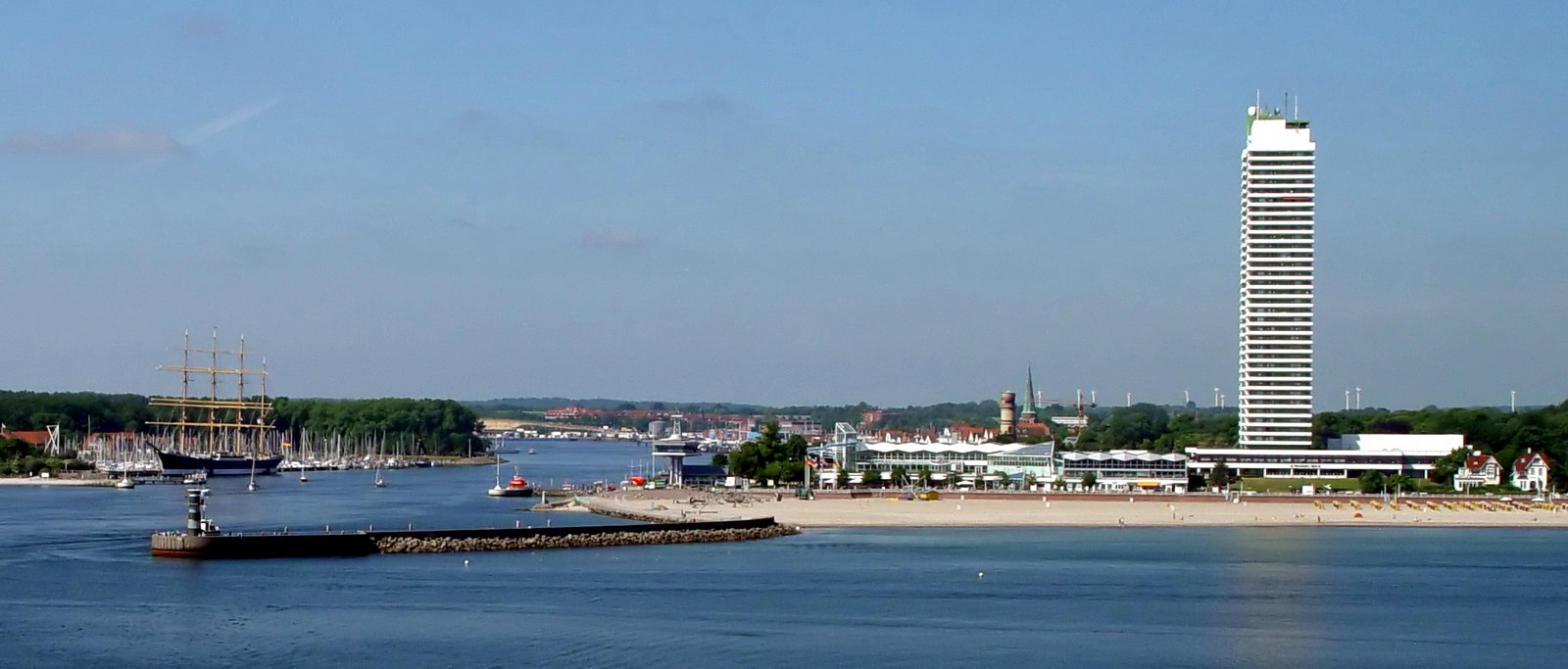
Mouth of river Trave

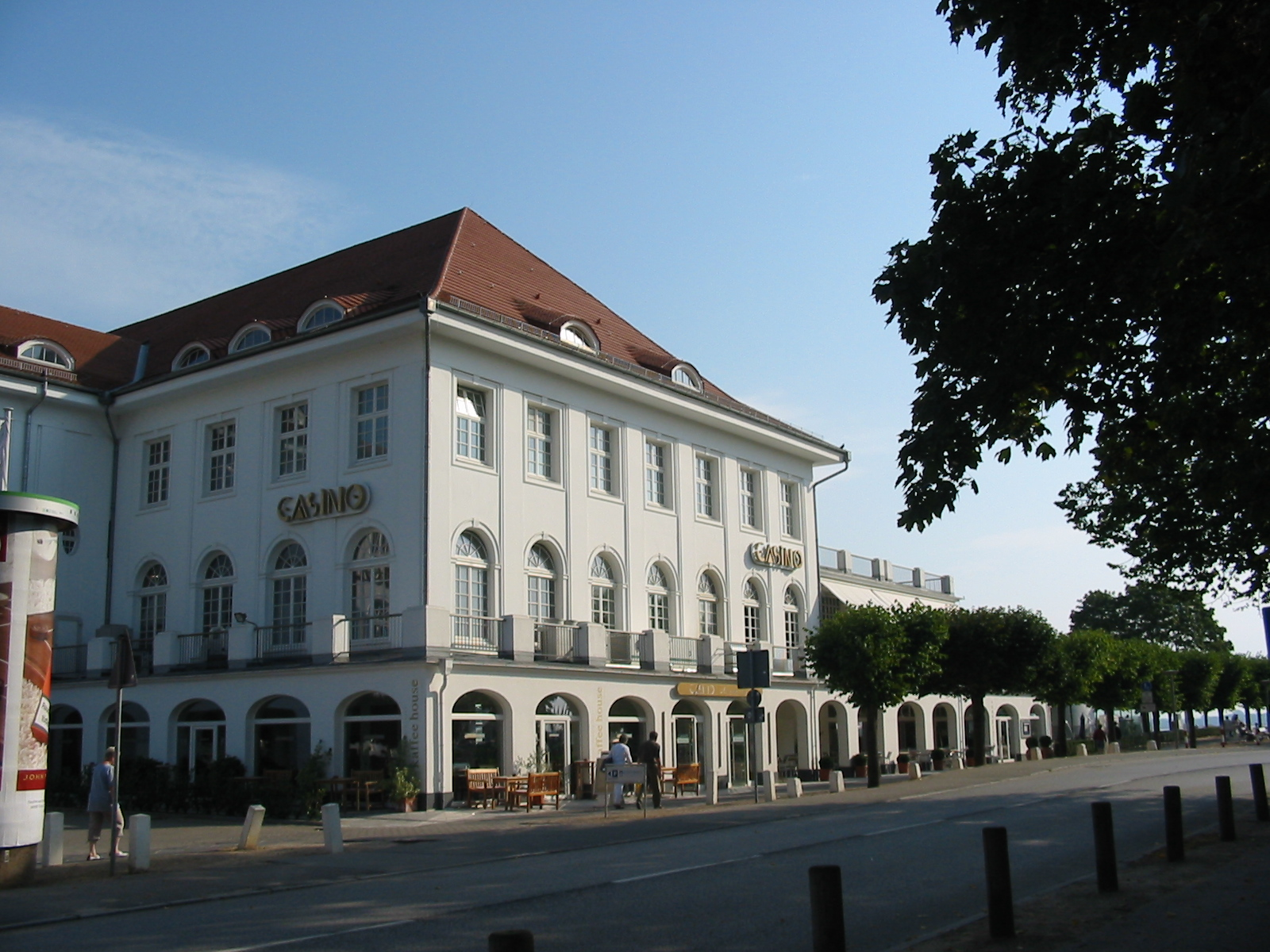
Casino building, now Columbia hotel

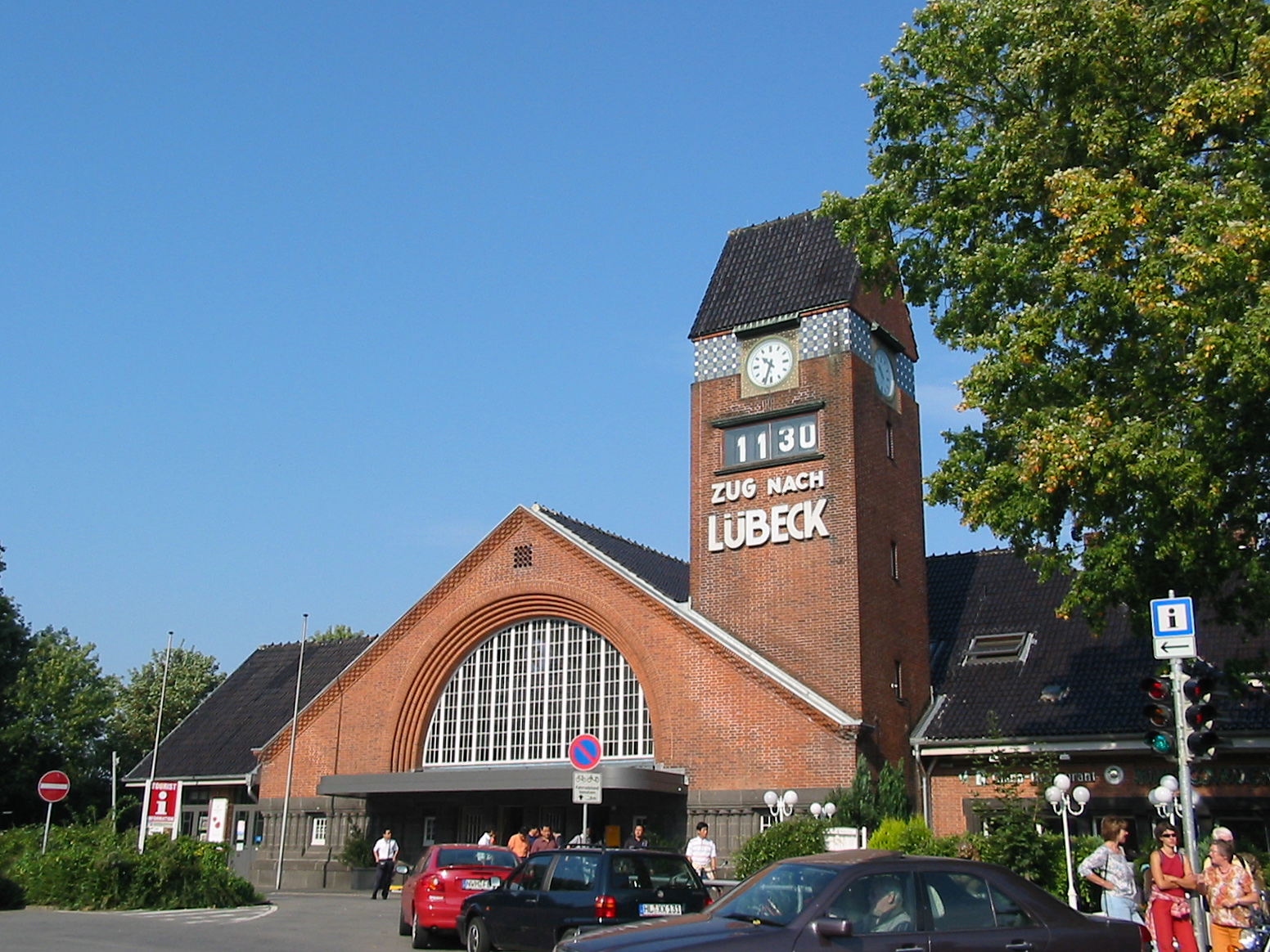
Lübeck-Travemünde Strand station, displaying the time of the next Lübeck train

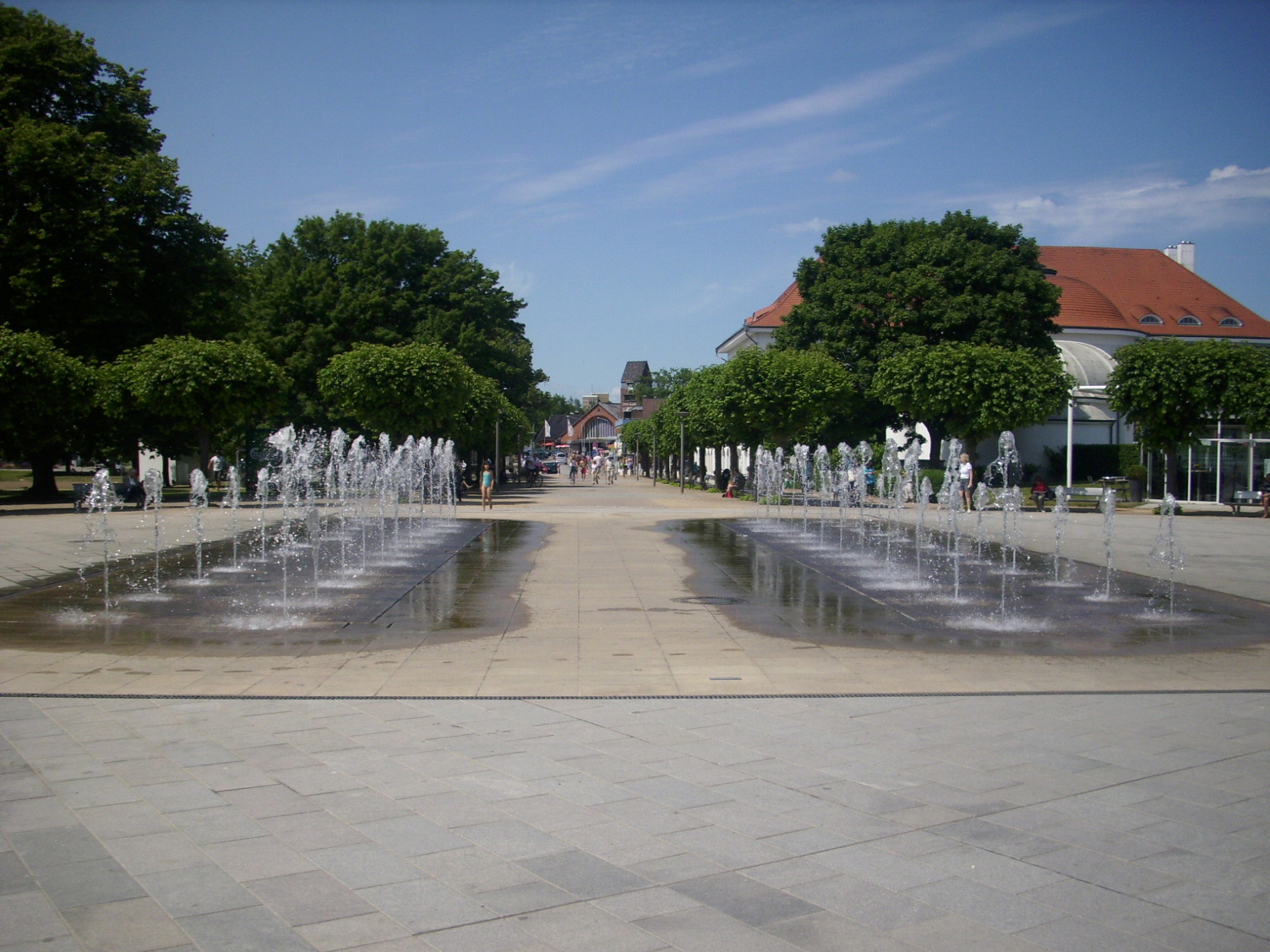
The fountain field, only 200 meters from the railway station, marks the beginning of the promenade.

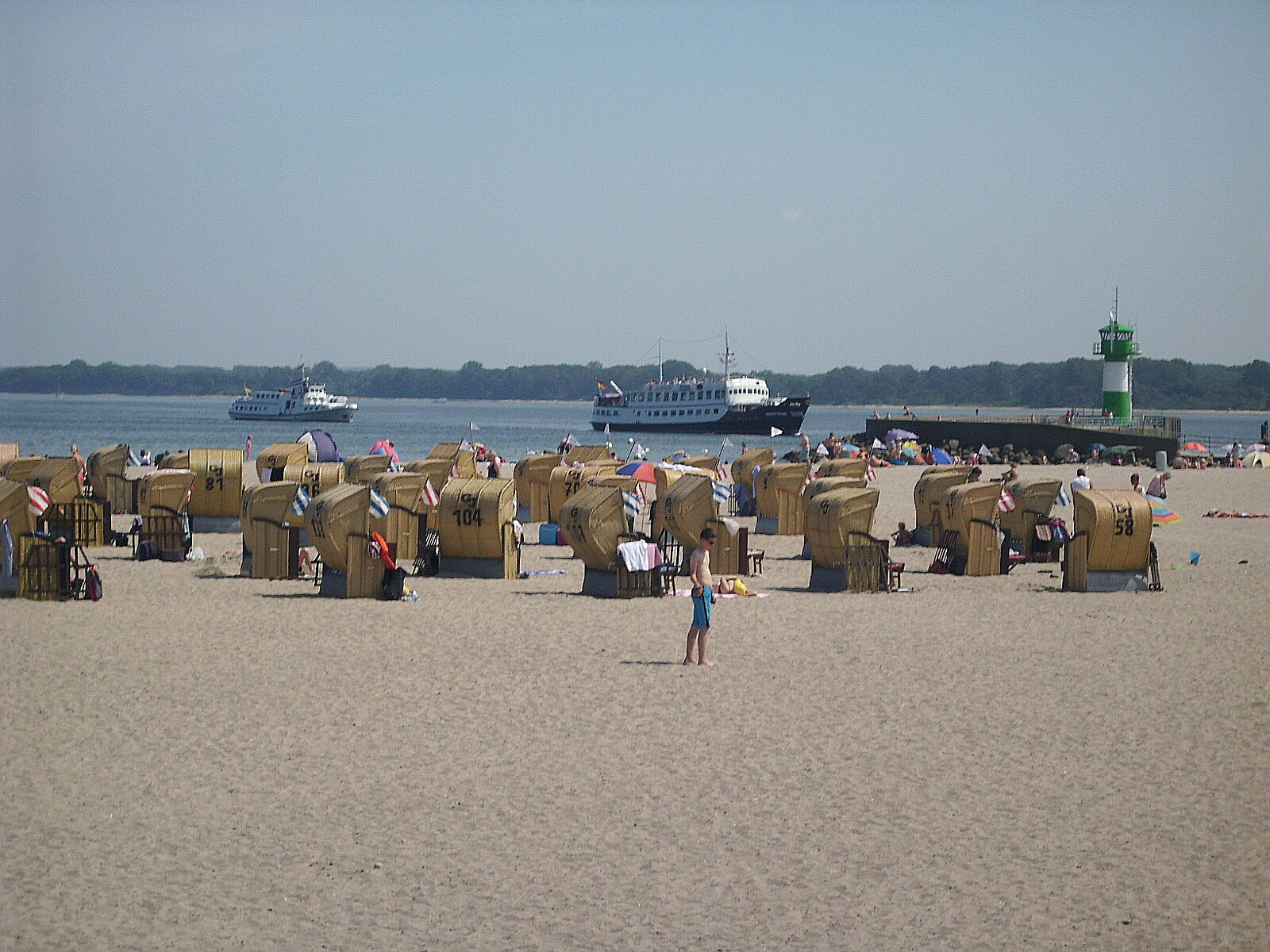
Excursion boats and roofed wicker beach chairs

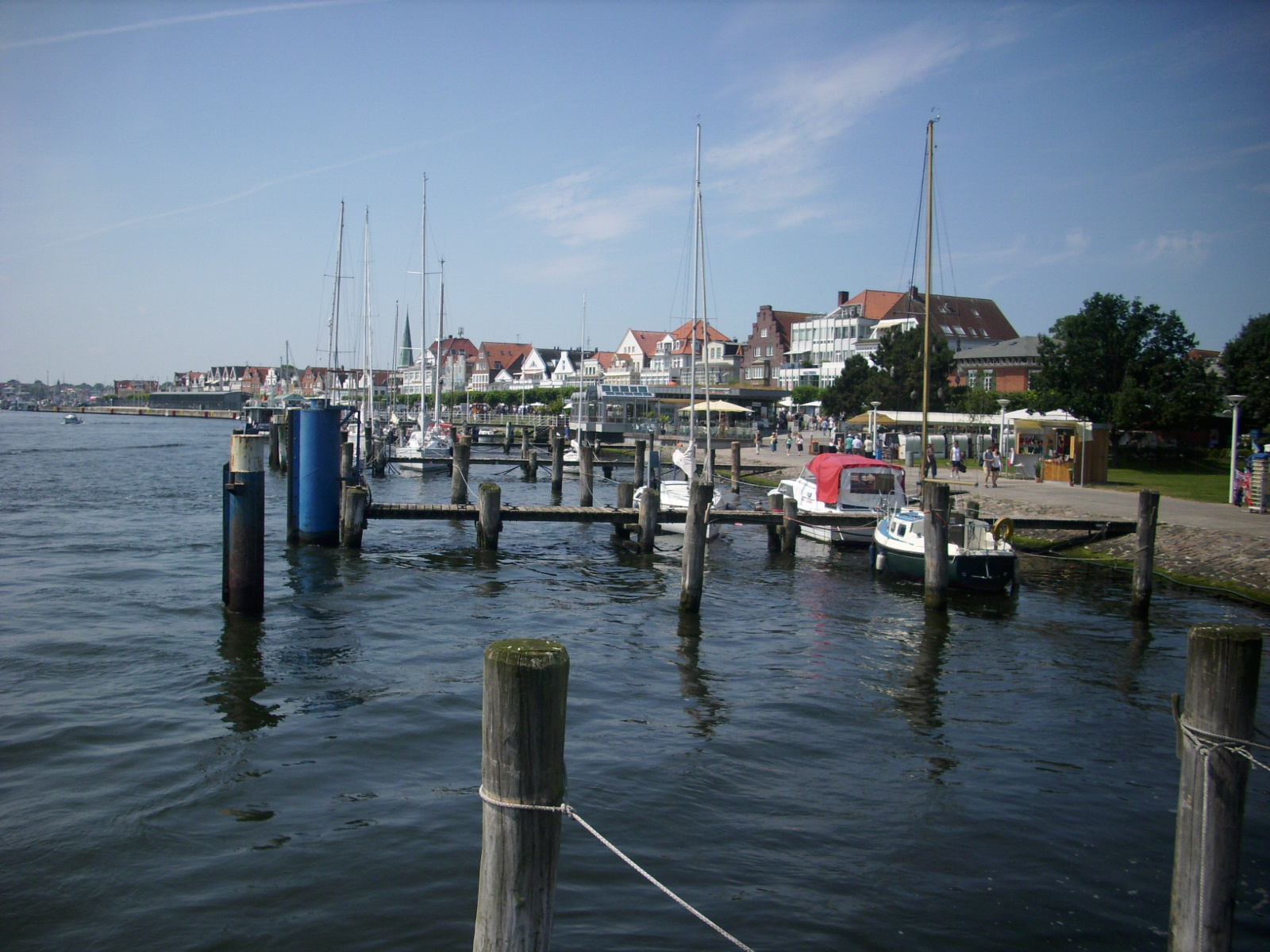
View of the town from the Trave promenade

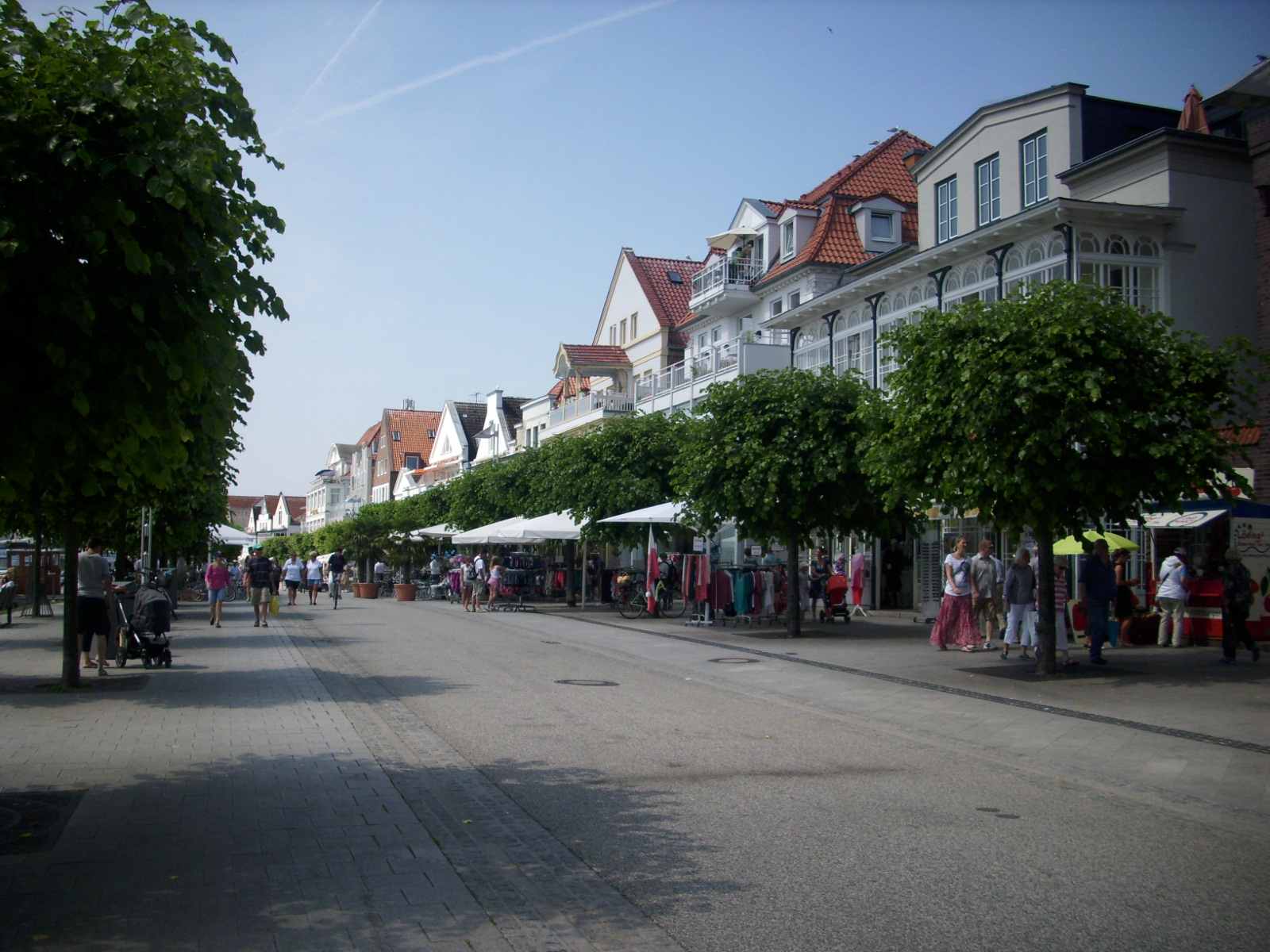
The shopping street Vorderreihe

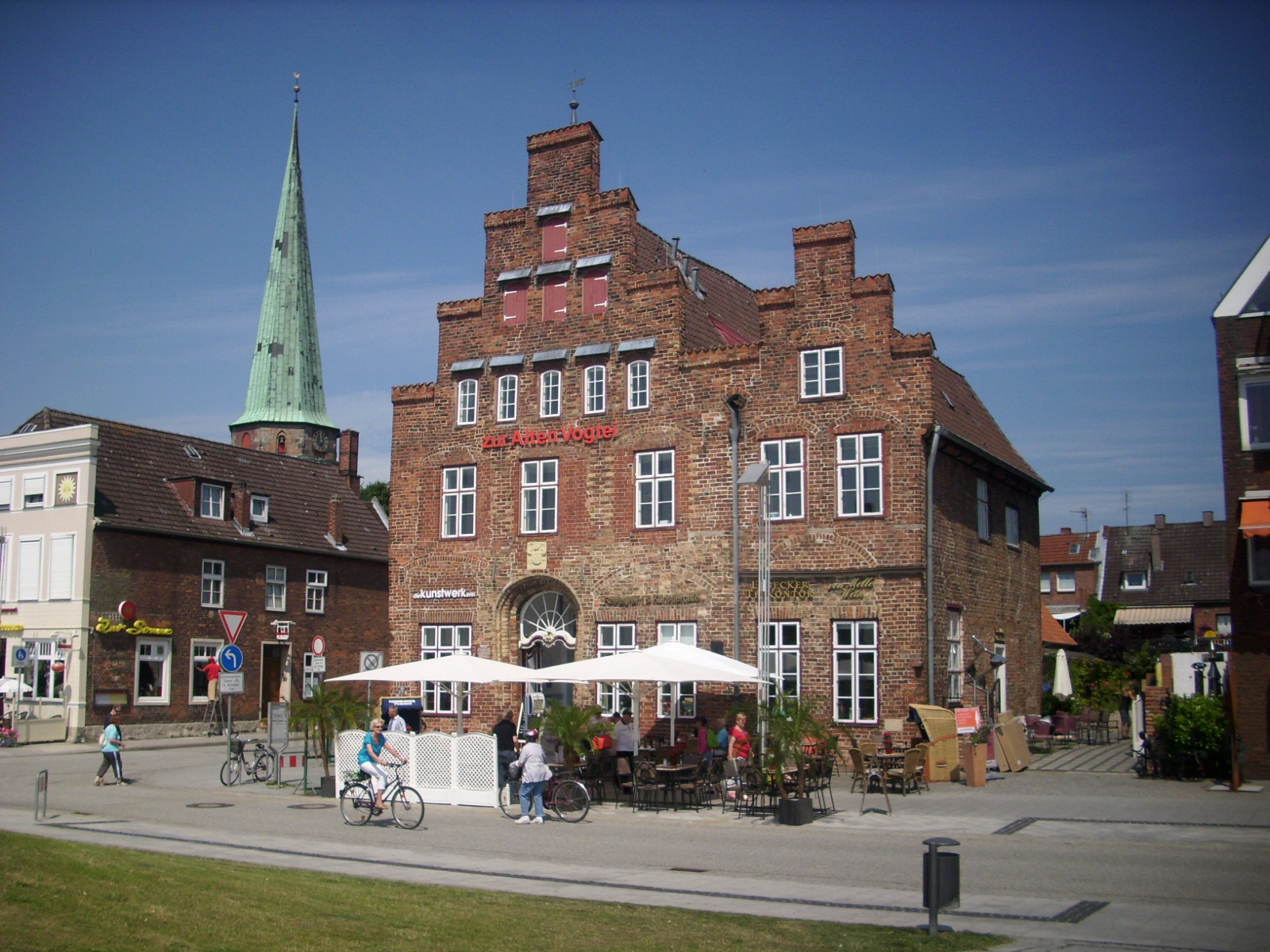
The bailiff's residence from 1551, one of the oldest buildings in town

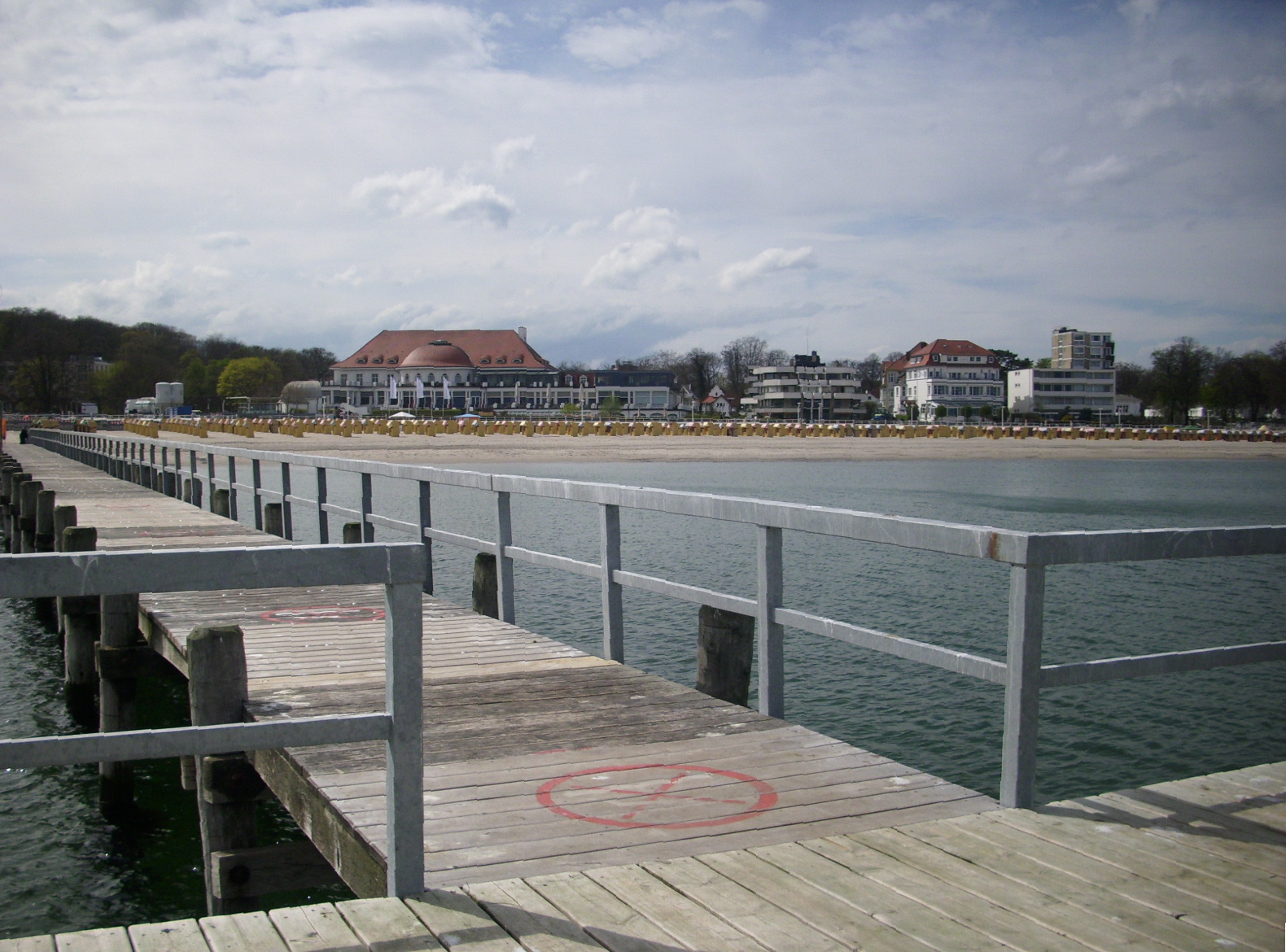
View from the boardwalk, beach and Columbia hotel (the former Casino building)

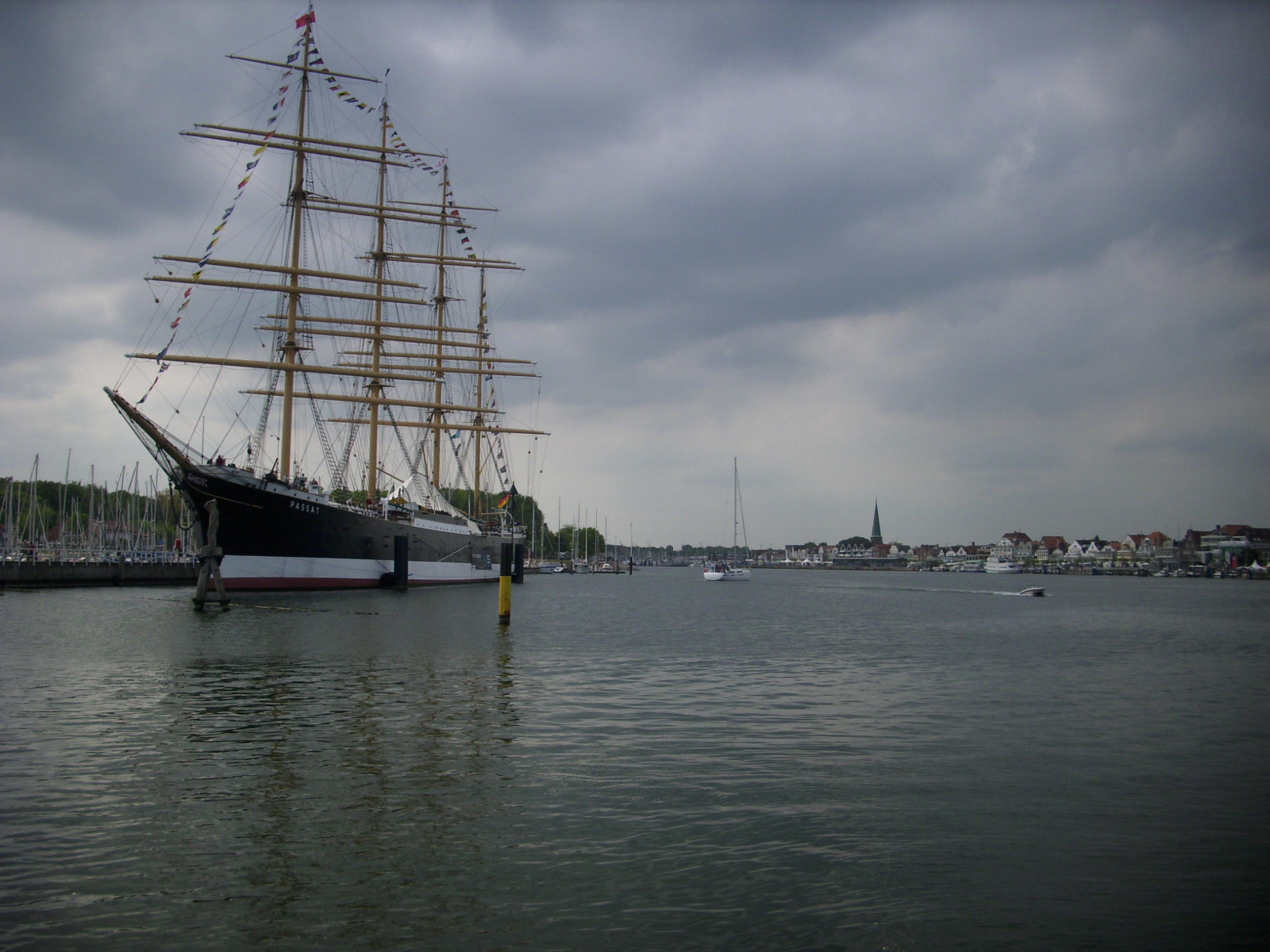
River Trave with the tall sailing ship Passat and the town skyline

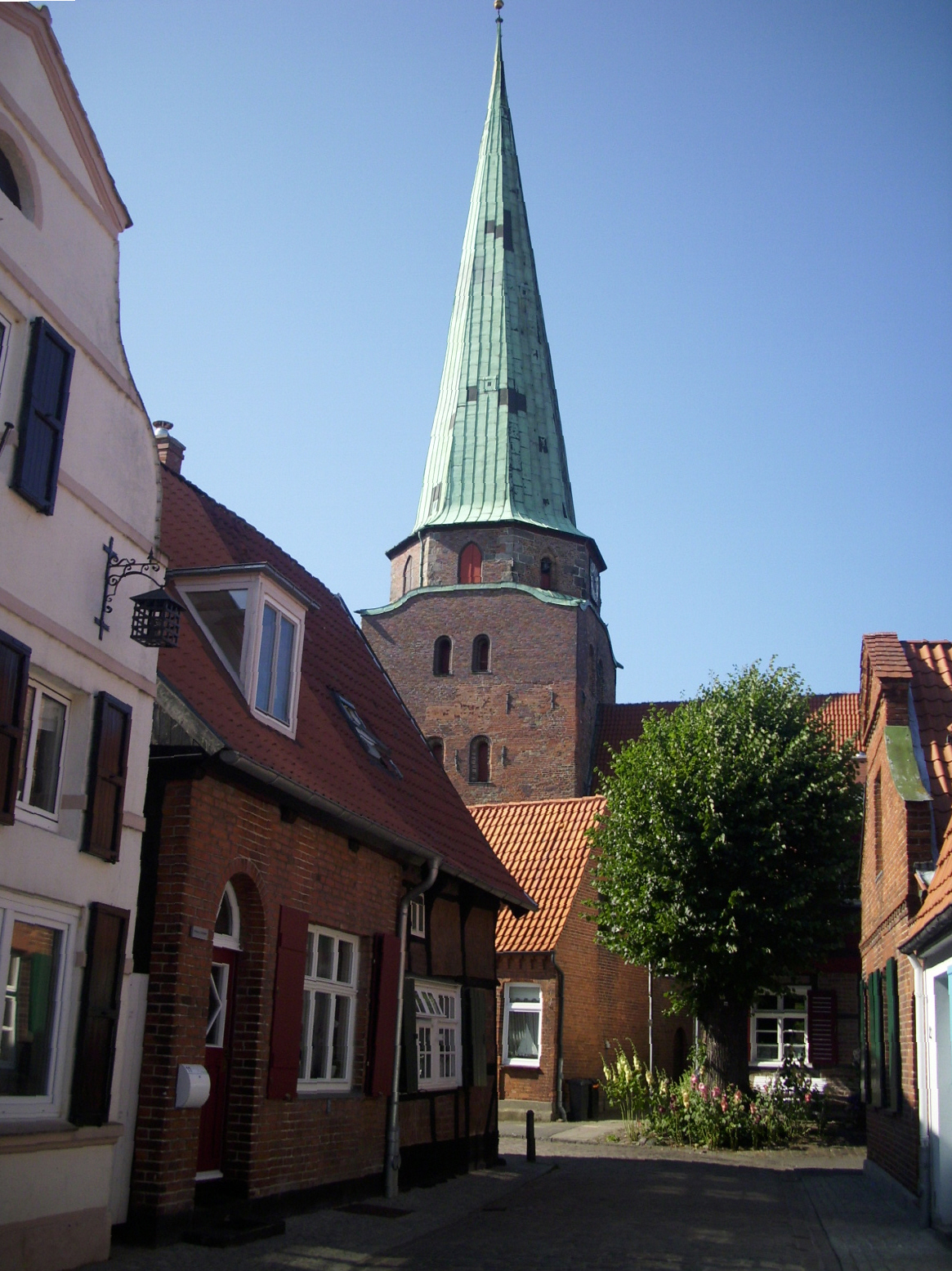
Ancient houses and the tower of St Lorenz Church

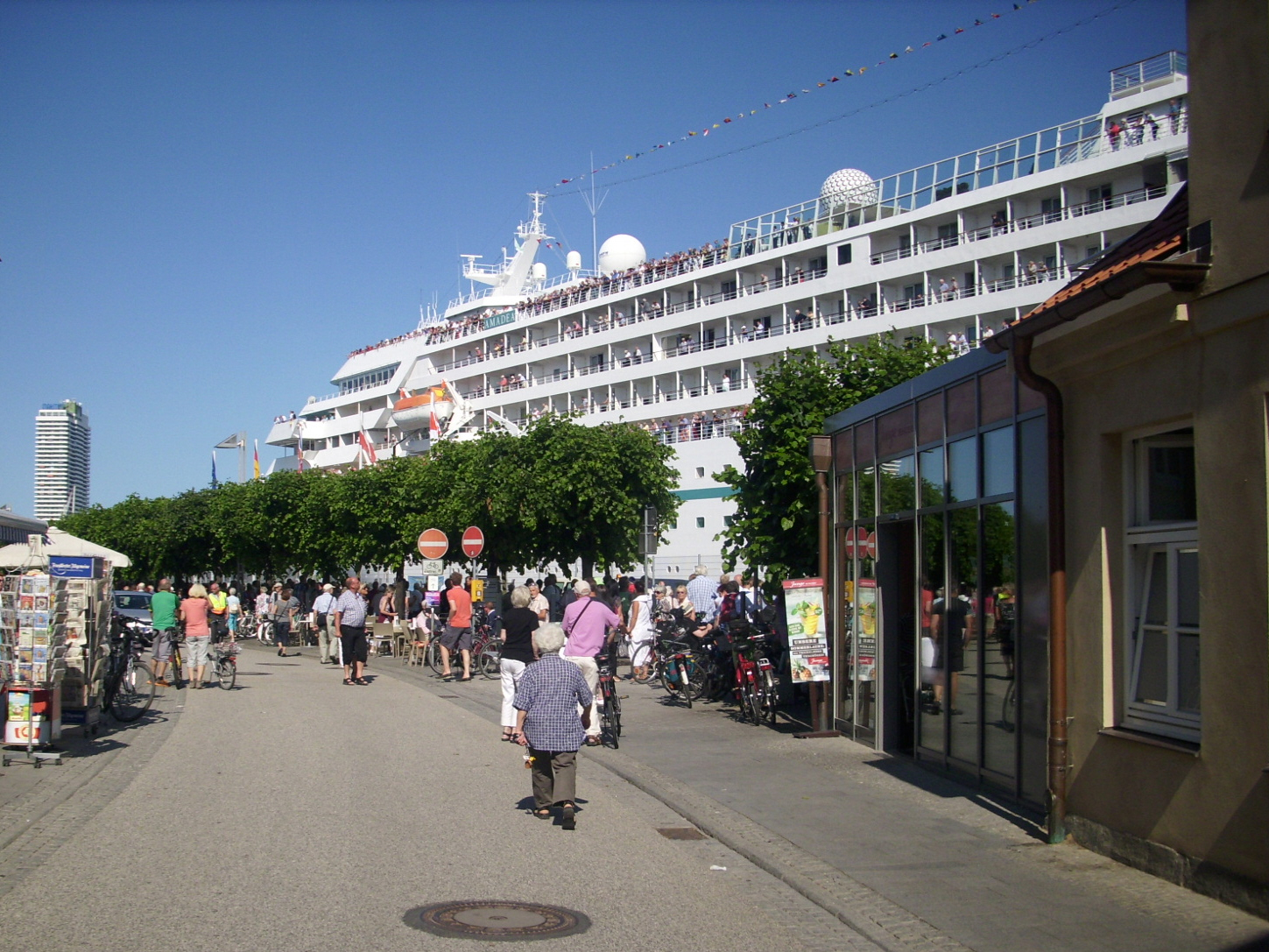
Cruise ship at Ostpreussen Quay, close to the Vorderreihe promenade

== Notable people ==
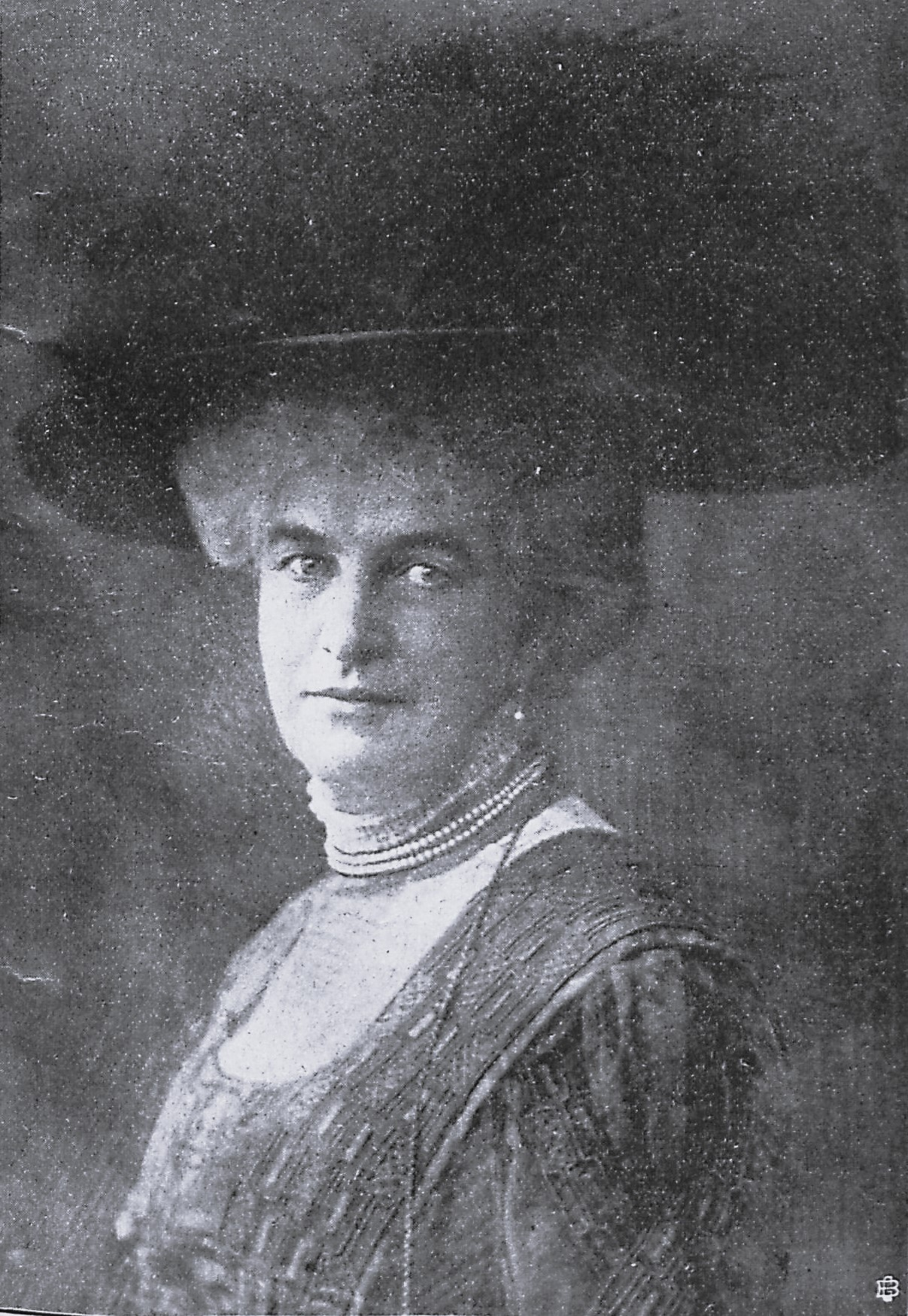
Ida Boy-Ed

- Ida Boy-Ed (1852–1928) – German writer, supporter of women's issues, she wrote widely read books and newspaper articles.
- Friedrich Naumann (1860–1919) – German liberal politician and Protestant parish pastor
- Otto Ciliax (1891–1964) – admiral during WWII, served in the navies of the German Empire, the Weimar Republic and Nazi Germany.
- Lilo Peters (1913–2001) – North German painter and sculptor
- Peter Nogly (born 1947) – German football coach and a former player
- Rötger Feldmann (born 1950) – German comic-book artist, created the character Werner.
- Torsten Wohlert (born 1965) – German former footballer
