= Bay of Lübeck =

Basin off the coast of northeastern Germany

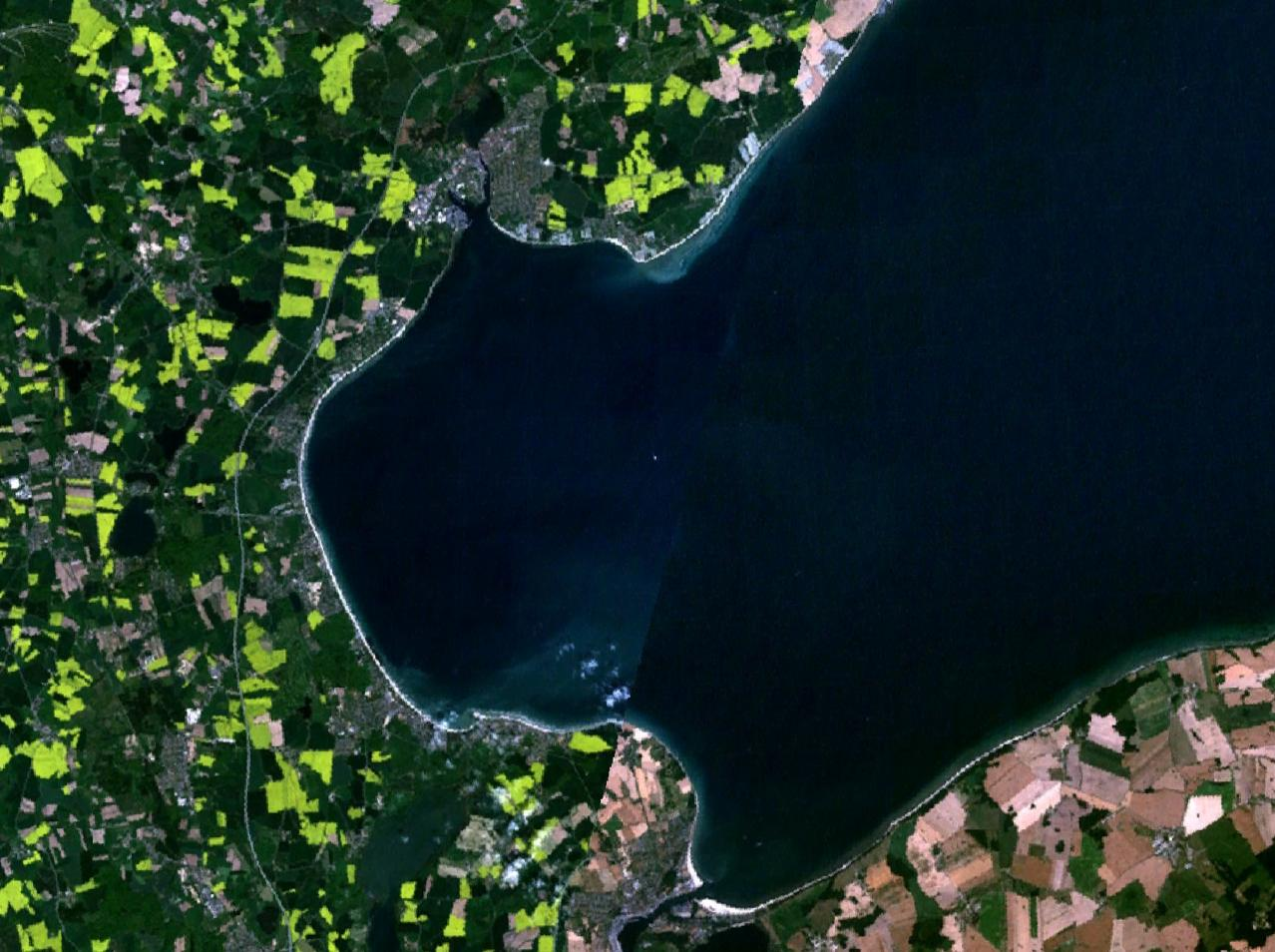
- Satellite picture of the Bay of Lübeck

- Location within Mecklenburg-Vorpommern
- Coordinates: 54°09′33″N 11°19′20″E
- Type: Bay
- River sources: Elbe, Trave
- Ocean/sea sources: Baltic Sea
- Basin countries: Germany
- Settlements: Lübeck

The Bay of Lübeck (German: Lübecker Bucht, German pronunciation), also known as the Bight of Lübeck, is a basin in the southwestern Baltic Sea, off the shores of the German states of Mecklenburg-Vorpommern and Schleswig-Holstein. It forms the southwestern part of the Bay of Mecklenburg.

The main port is Travemünde, a borough of the city of Lübeck, at the mouth of river Trave. The Elbe–Lübeck Canal connects the Baltic Sea with the Elbe River. The bay is surrounded by the land strips of Ostholstein and Nordwestmecklenburg. Located in the North of the Bay, the Hansa-Park amusement park creates a popular sight for families all around the region and Southern Denmark. The Pötenitzer Wiek Lake splits the states of Schleswig-Holstein and Mecklenburg-Vorpommern and got historical attention, as it gave East Germany refugees the possibility to flee from East Germany into West Germany.

== Gallery ==
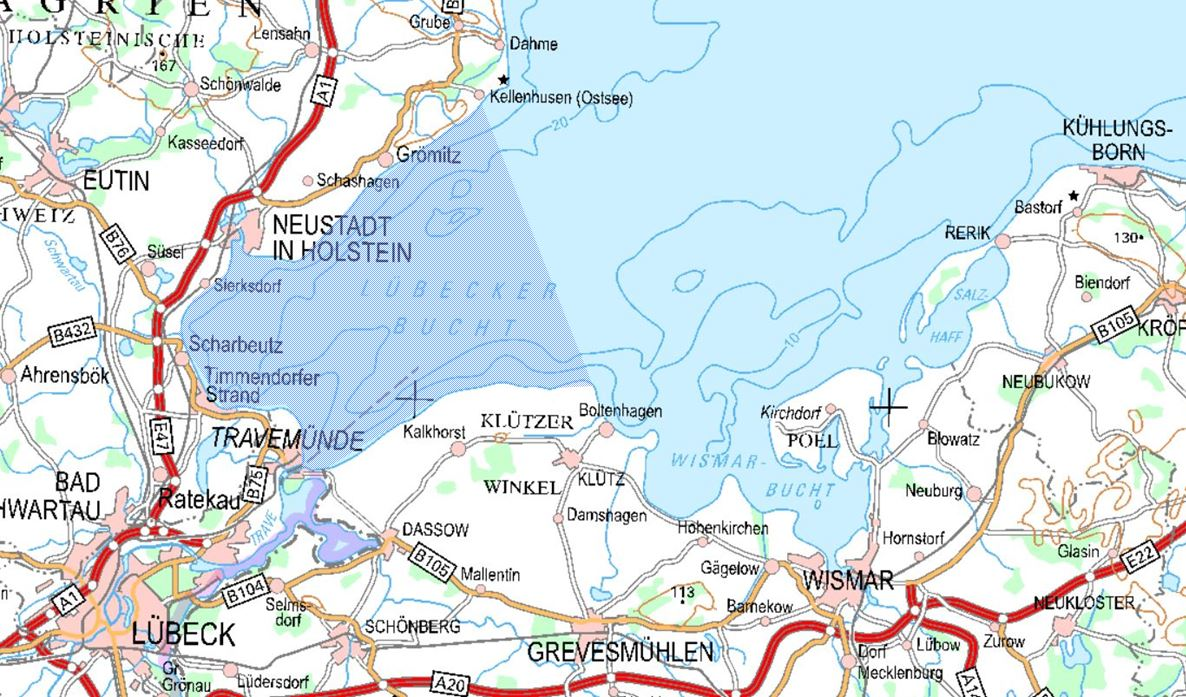

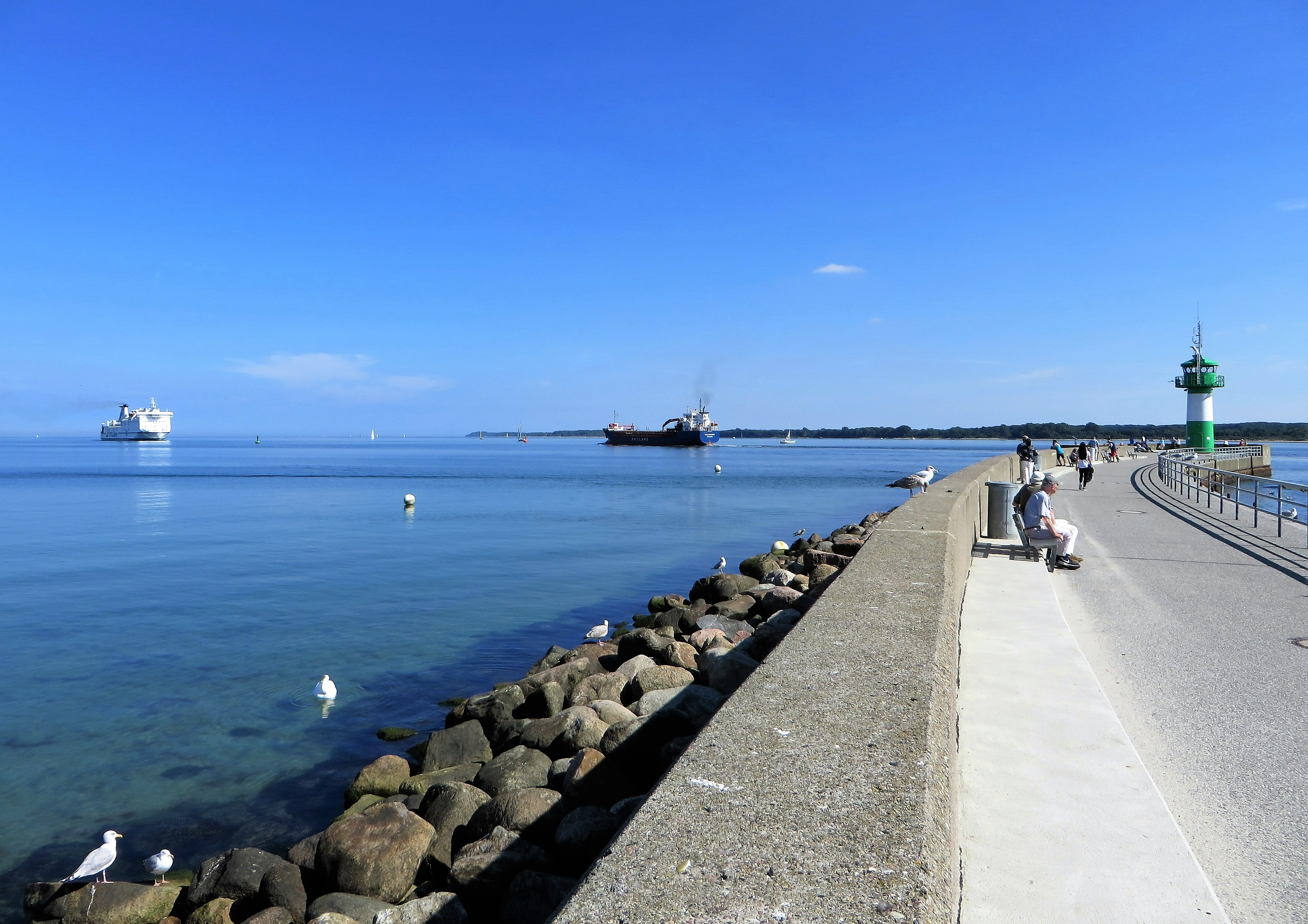

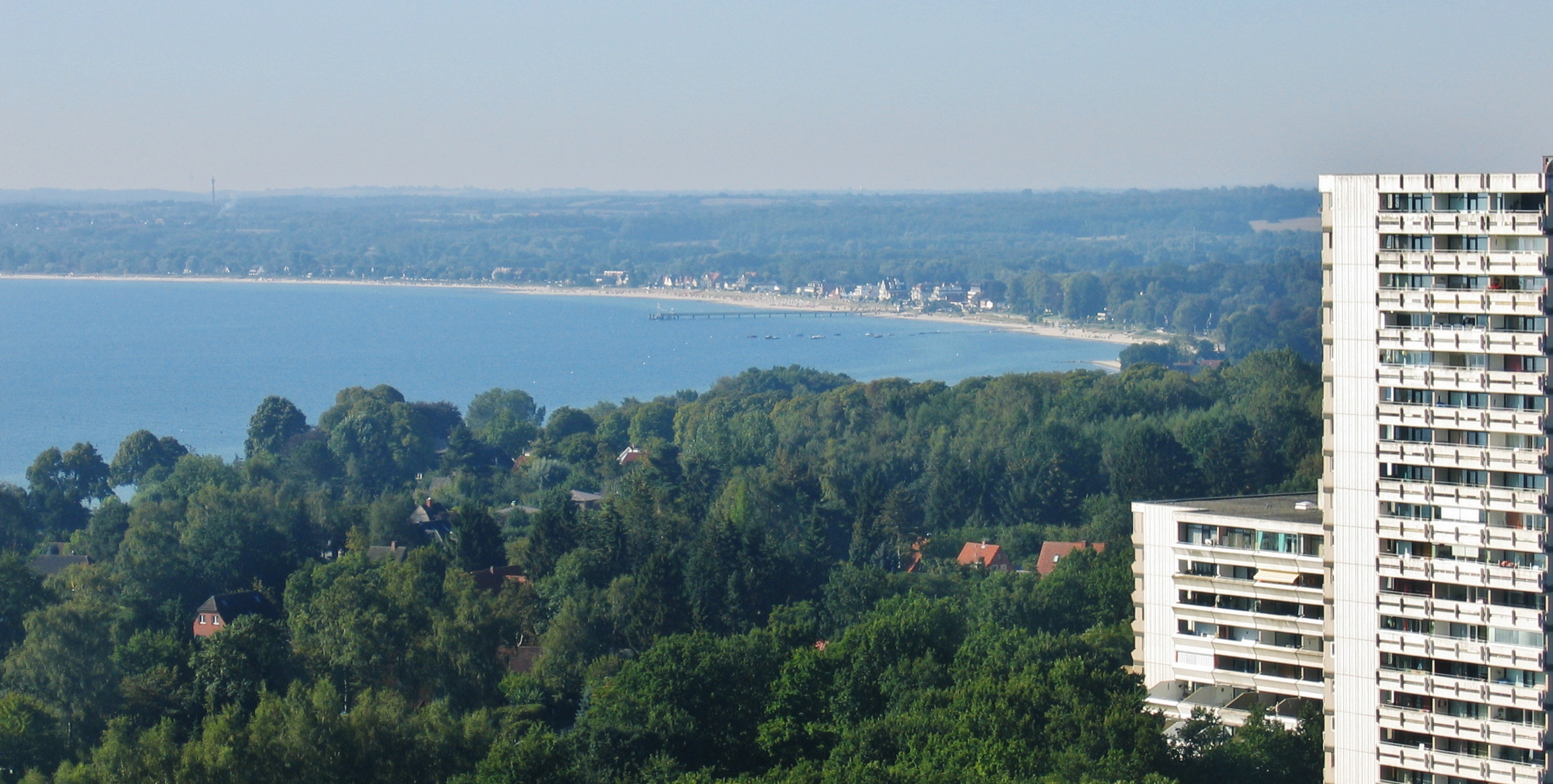

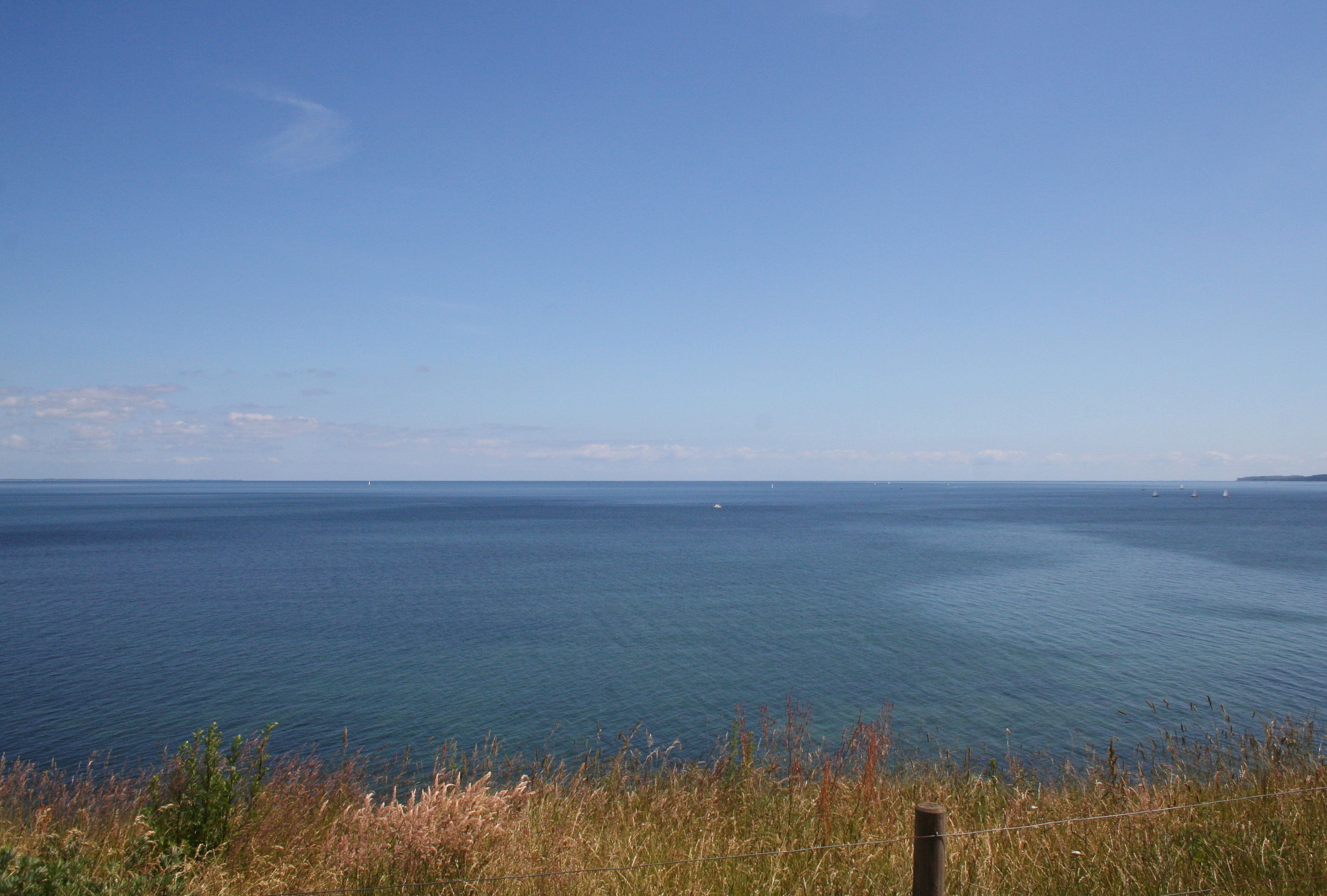

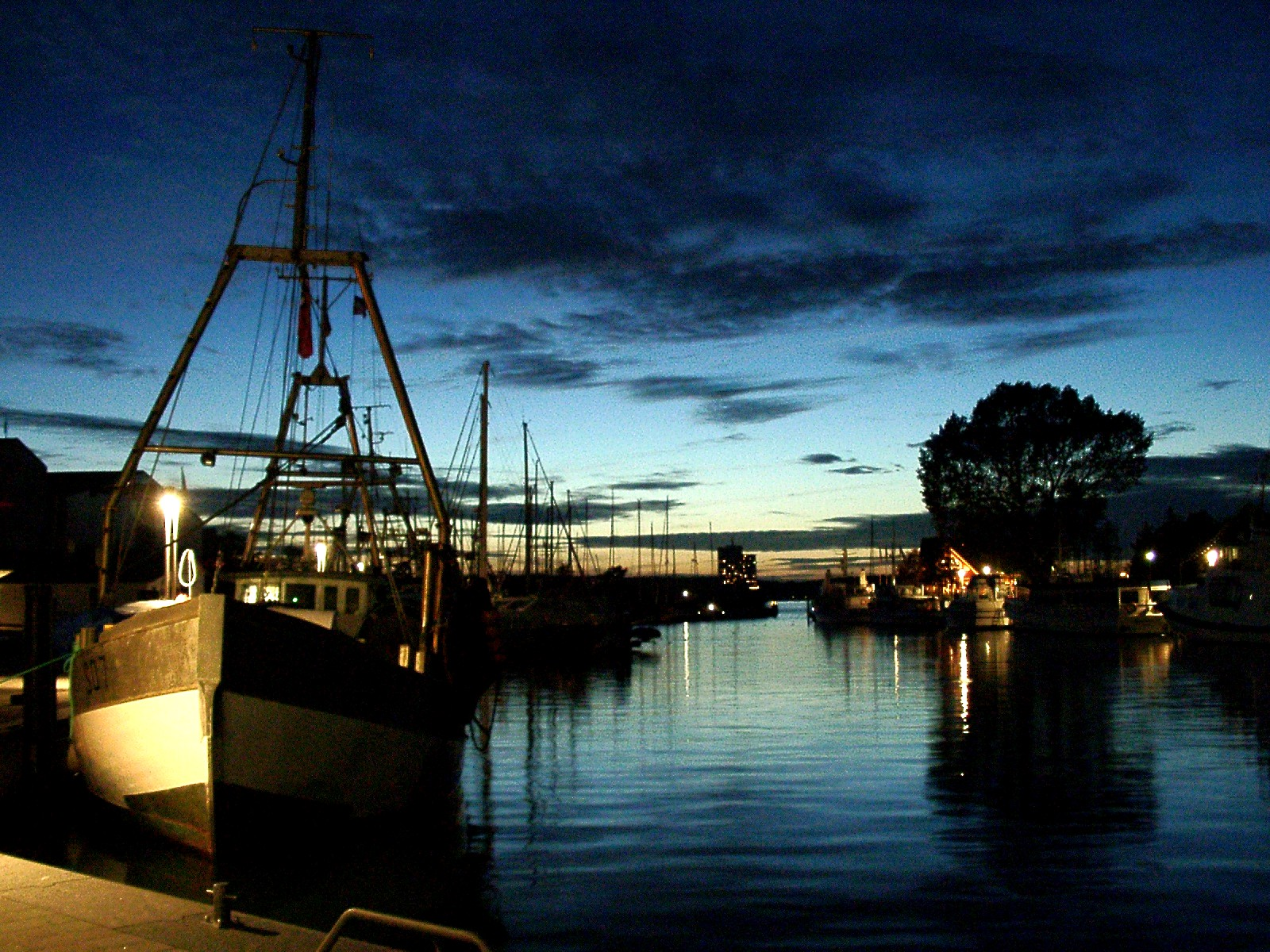

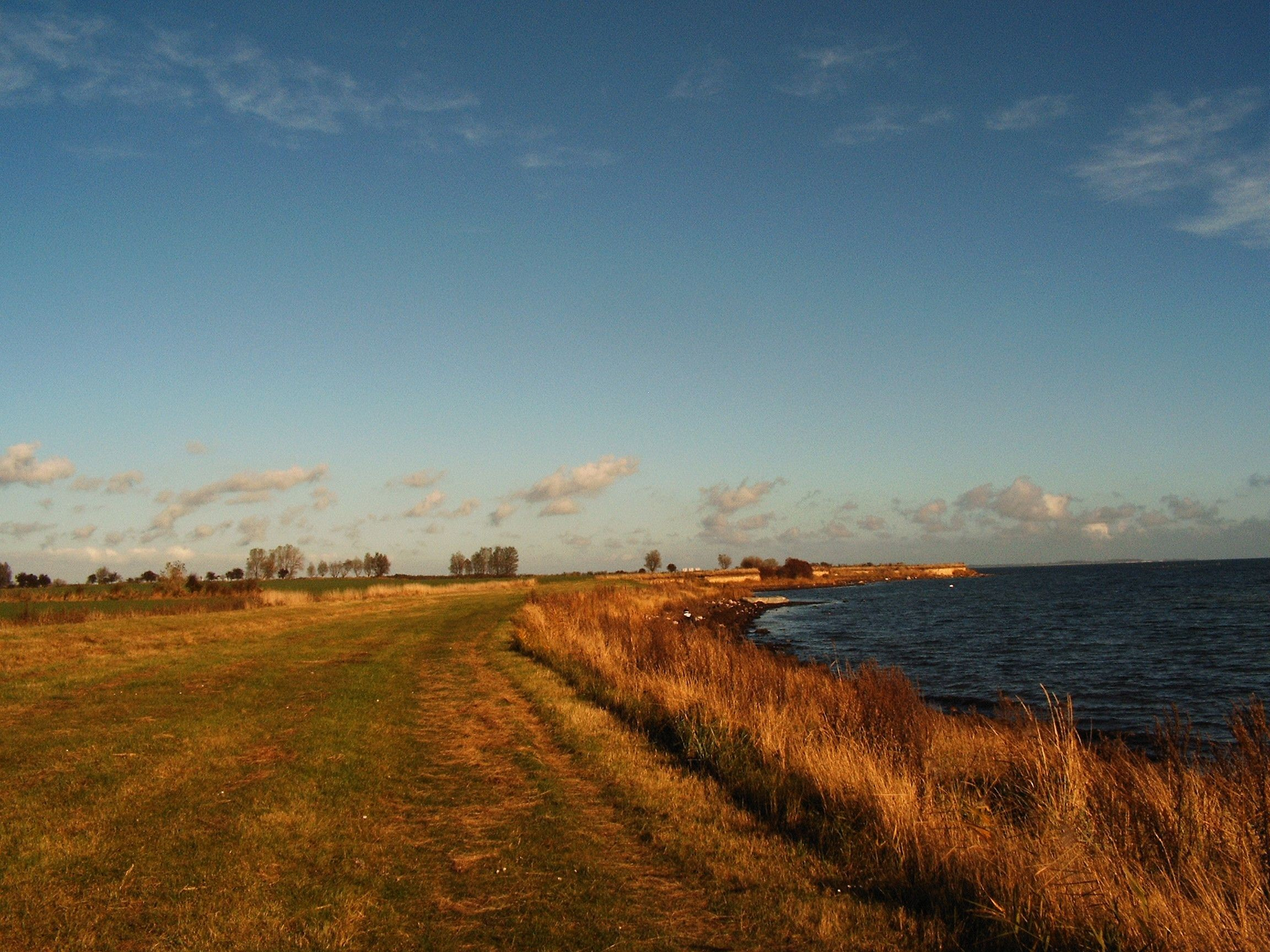

== See also ==
- Priwall Peninsula with the museum ship Passat
- Travemünder Woche – traditional sailing races on the Bay of Lübeck
- The disaster on May 3, 1945, involving these 3 ships:
  - Cap Arcona
  - Thielbek
  - Deutschland
- U-48
- Lighthouses and lightvessels in Germany
