= Trave =

River in northern Germany

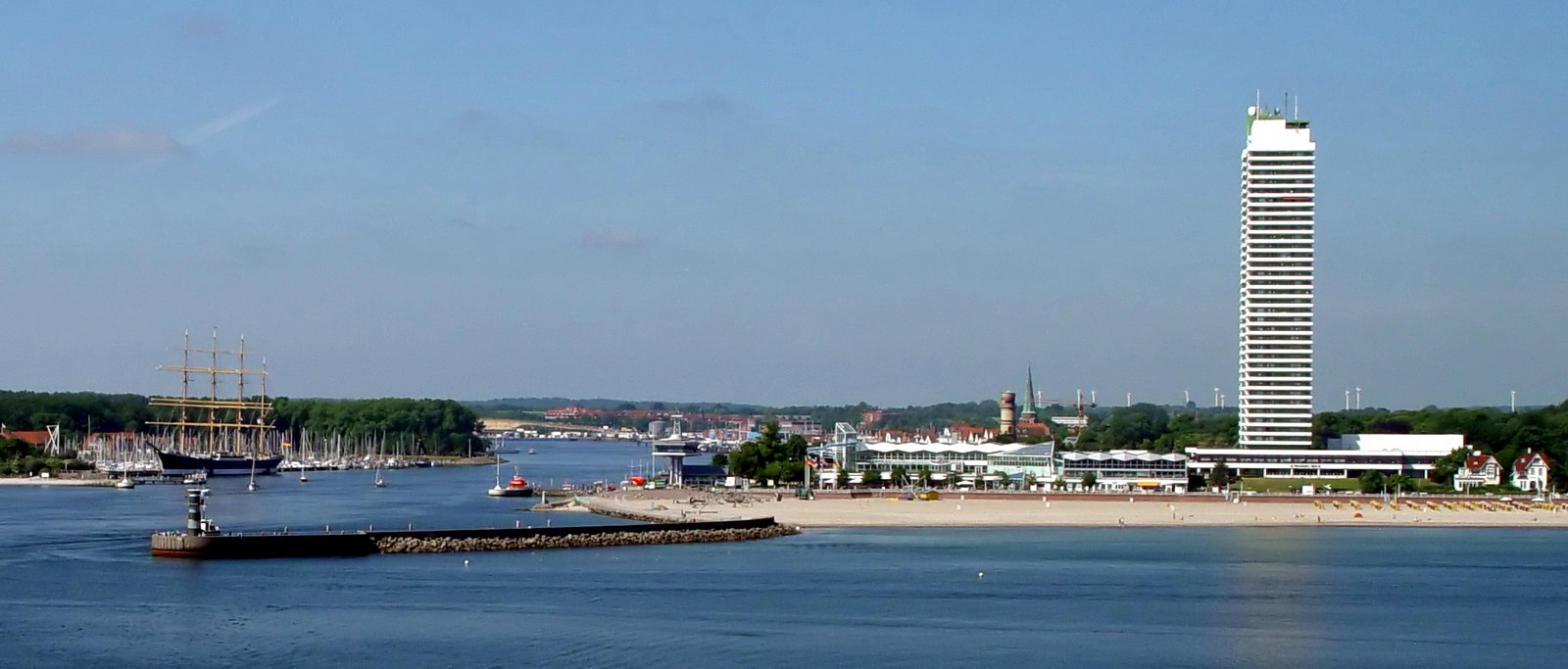
- Mouth of the Trave on the Baltic Sea

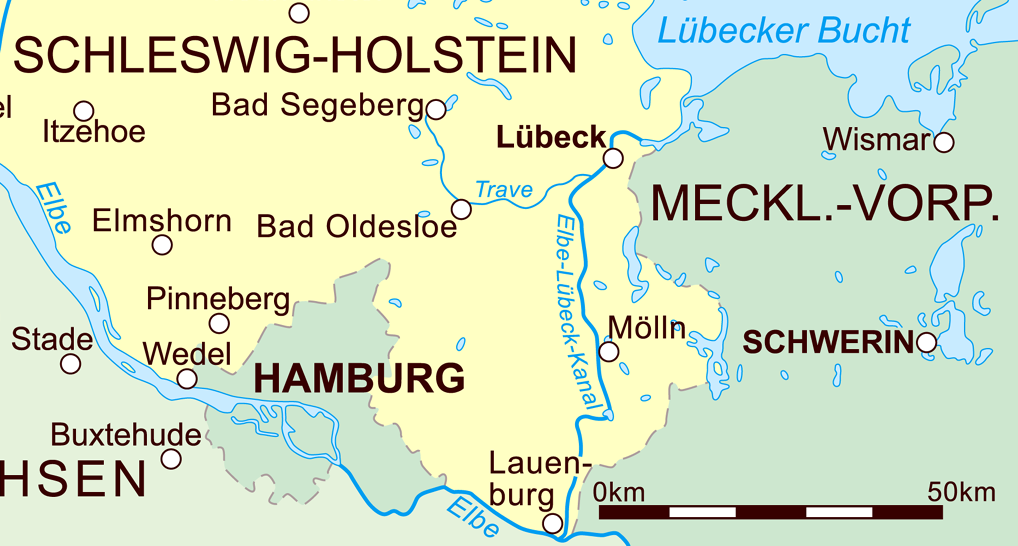
- The Trave in eastern Schleswig-Holstein

Location
- Country: Germany
- State: Schleswig-Holstein
- Cities: Bad Segeberg; Bad Oldesloe; Lübeck; Travemünde

Physical characteristics
- Source
  - location: Gießelrade, Ahrensbök, Ostholstein, Schleswig-Holstein
- Mouth
  - location: Bay of Lübeck (Baltic Sea); 53°57′39″N 10°53′14″E
- Length: 124 km (77 mi)
- Basin size: 2,676 km^{2} (1,033 sq mi)

Basin features
- Tributaries
  - left: Clever Au, Schwartau
  - right: Beste, Wakenitz, Stepenitz
- Waterbodies: Wardersee, Pötenitzer Wiek, Dassower See

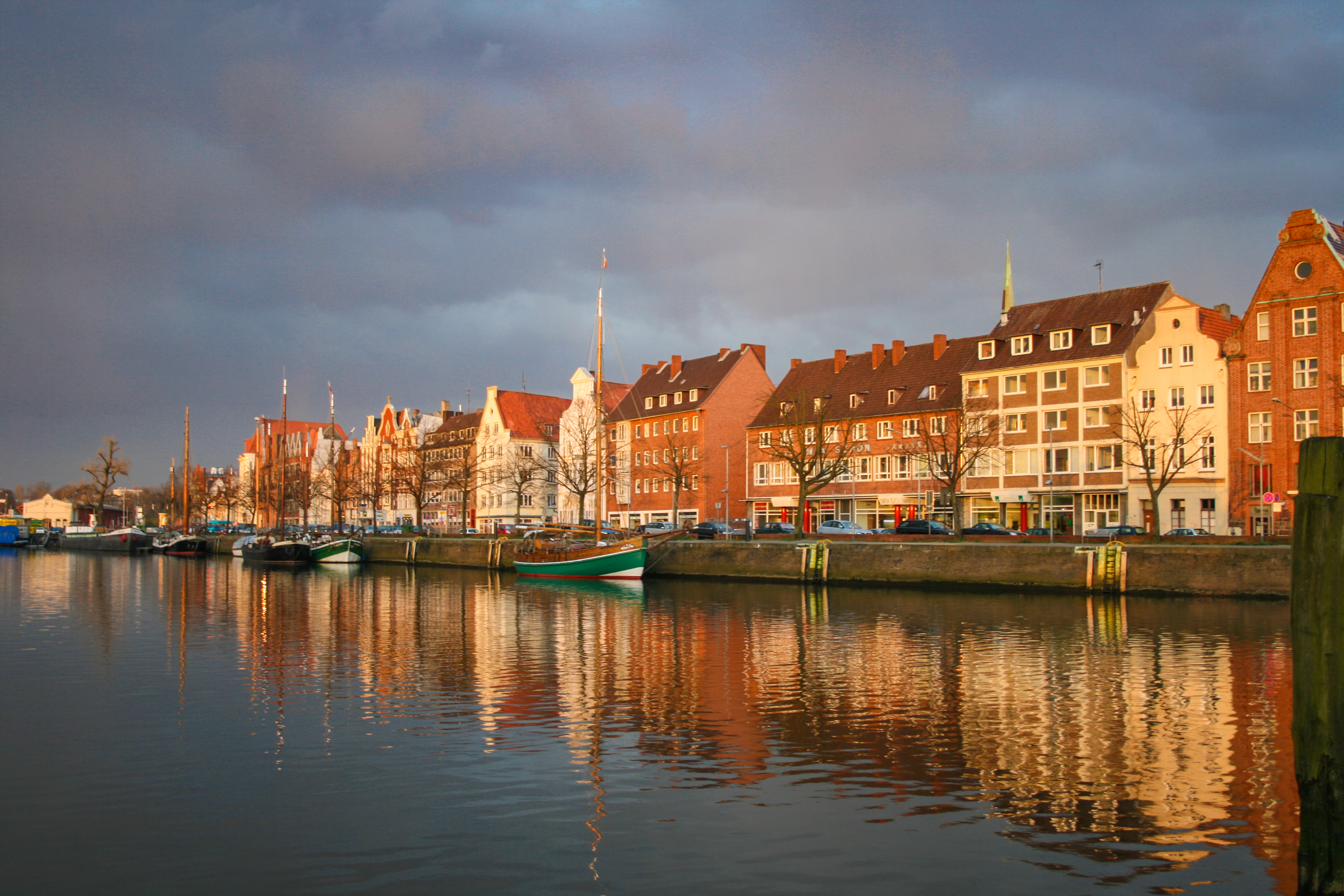
The Trave in Lübeck

The Trave (German pronunciation: [ˈtʁaːvə]) is a river in Schleswig-Holstein, Germany. It is approximately 124 kilometres (77 mi) long, running from its source near the village of Gießelrade in Ostholstein to Travemünde, where it flows into the Baltic Sea. It passes through Bad Segeberg, Bad Oldesloe, and Lübeck, where it is linked to the Elbe–Lübeck Canal. It is navigable for sea-going vessels from the Baltic to the Lübeck ports. The Herren Tunnel crosses the Trave, as do numerous bridges, and a ferry connects Travemünde with Priwall. Tributaries of the Trave include the Wakenitz and the Stepenitz.

== Course ==
=== Source and upper Trave ===
The Trave rises in Gießelrade (a village in Ostholstein), whence it flows first southwesterly through the Wardersee to Bad Segeberg and then further south to Bad Oldesloe. There it bends eastward to just south of Reinfeld, flowing past Hamberge and Moisling (a district of Lübeck) to reach Lübeck.

=== In Lübeck ===
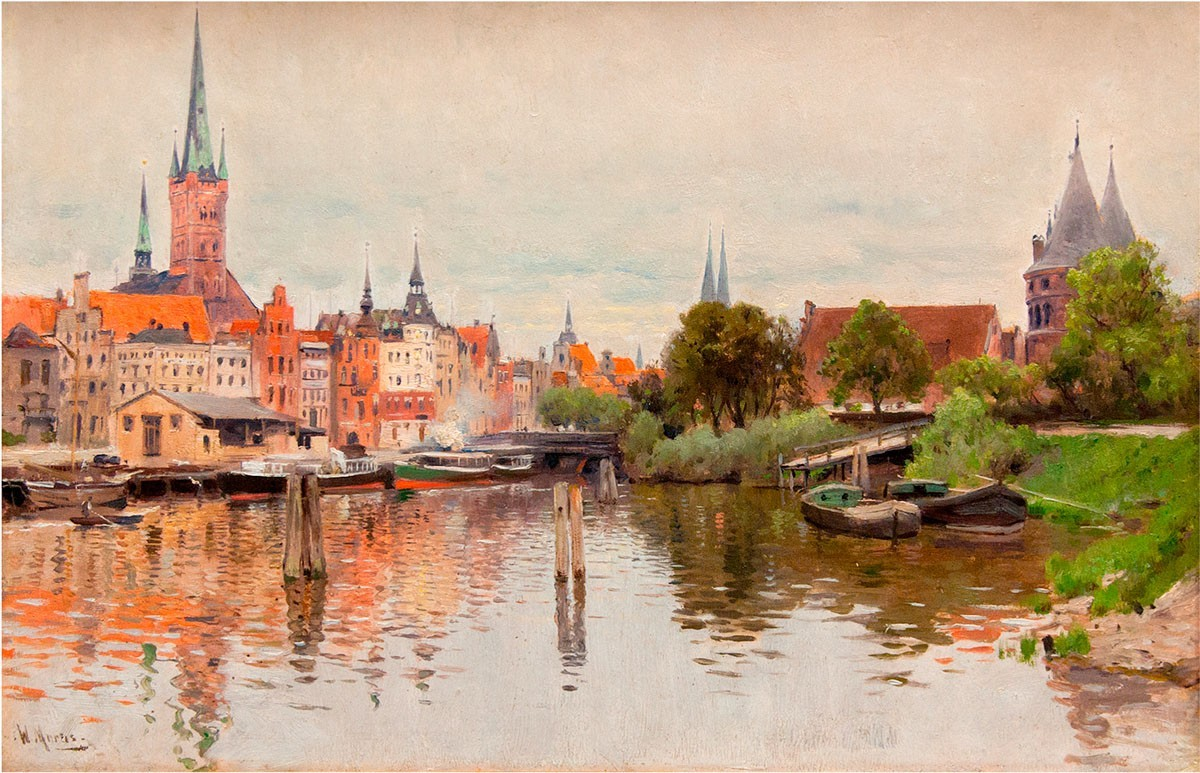
The Trave in Lübeck, by Walter Moras

The Elbe–Lübeck Canal joins the Trave from the south shortly before the river reaches Lübeck. In medieval Lübeck the river was transformed according to the needs of shipping and the town's defense, making the Old Town into an island. South of the Lübeck Cathedral the channel forks in several directions, with the original channel known as the Town Trave. The Lübeck town moat branches off to the west, and the Canal Trave separates eastward from the Town Trave's course and runs in the former bed of the Wakenitz to the northeast side of the Old Town. The modern Wakenitz joins the Canal Trave from the east, and the three channels recombine at the north end of the Old Town island.

=== Lower Trave ===
North of Lübeck the seaports begin. Between the Old Town and Teerhof Island is Lübeck's commercial port. The Schwartau enters the river from the north here, near Bad Schwartau. On the peninsula between the Schwartau and the Trave is the Slavic castle of Liubice. The river passes the Schellbruch nature preserve and flows around Herreninsel. Here the city of Travemünde sits on the western shore. The Trave widens into the Traveförde estuary between Herreninsel and the mouth in the Bay of Lübeck, including the Pötenitzer Wiek and the Dassower See (fed by the Stepenitz). The river then flows out between Travemünde and the Priwall Peninsula into the Baltic Sea.

== Geopolitical significance ==
In the early Middle Ages, the upper reaches of the Trave (together with the Schwentine) formed part of the Limes Saxoniae and the western boundary of Wagria. In the Old Town of Lübeck the river forms part of the medieval town fortifications. The lower reaches today form the border between Schleswig-Holstein and Mecklenburg-Vorpommern.

== Geology ==
The course of the lower Trave arose in the last ice age (the Weichselian glaciation), when glacier flows carved deep fjords into what is now the Baltic Sea coast. Since the end of the ice age the groove communicates with the sea; its lower end is called the Traveförde (Trave Fjord).

== Recreation and conservation ==
The area surrounding the course of the Trave is designated as a preserved "flora and fauna habitat" by the European Union Habitats Directive. The river runs through or beside a series of nature preserves and undeveloped lands, and its basin is home to a variety of rare and endangered animal species. The area is a popular destination for hiking, cycling, canoeing and fishing. The German Friends of Nature organization declared the Trave its German Riverscape of the Year for 2016/17.

== See also ==
- List of rivers of Schleswig-Holstein
