= Priwall Peninsula =

Peninsula on the Baltic Sea coast of Germany

Coordinates: 53°57′N 10°53′E

The Priwall Peninsula (German: die Halbinsel Priwall or Der Priwall) is a spit located across from the town of Travemünde at the Trave River estuary, on Germany's Baltic Sea coast. Since 1226 it has been administratively part of Travemünde, itself controlled by Lübeck.

The southern part has been designated a nature reserve (Naturschutzgebiet Südlicher Priwall). The Priwall is the eastern terminus of a bicycle path, opened in 1995, that begins at the Danish border at the town of Kruså. More famously, it is the northern terminus of the former inner German border, and a few remnants of the border fortifications have been preserved near the beach. Until 1990, a small section of Priwall belonged to East Germany . Its border with Priwall in Schleswig-Holstein formed the northernmost part of the Inner German border .

On Priwall, access to the east and vice versa was only possible again three months after the fall of the Berlin Wall. On February 3, 1990, the opening of the fence was celebrated with a public festival attended by thousands of people from East and West. Initially, access was only possible on foot through the sand on the beach; passports were checked at a former East German border post. On April 12, 1990, a crossing over Mecklenburger Landstraße was opened, initially for two years only for pedestrians and cyclists. Since 1992, motor vehicles have been able to cross following the construction of a new road connection.

The Priwall's principal attraction is otherwise the four-masted barque Passat (now a museum ship) of the Flying P Line – which also included the four-masted barque Priwall.

The beaches of the Priwall at the Bay of Lübeck were the site of a former annual sand festival called Sand World.

== See also ==
- German language Wikipedia page for the Erprobungsstelle See/Travemünde on the Priwall Peninsula, one of the Luftwaffe aircraft test stations governed from Erprobungsstelle Rechlin during World War II.
