= Ludwigslust-Parchim II – Nordwestmecklenburg II – Landkreis Rostock I =

Federal electoral district of Germany

Coordinates: 53°42′26″N 11°43′45.865″E

13 Ludwigslust-Parchim II – Nordwestmecklenburg II – Landkreis Rostock I
- Electoral district for the Bundestag
- Ludwigslust-Parchim II – Nordwestmecklenburg II – Landkreis Rostock I in 2025
- State: Mecklenburg-Vorpommern
- Population: 249,300 (2019)
- Electorate: 205,042 (2021)
- Major settlements: Wismar; Parchim
- Area: 3,937.0 km^{2}

Current electoral district
- Created: 2002
- Party: AfD
- Member: Christoph Grimm
- Elected: 2025

Ludwigslust-Parchim II – Nordwestmecklenburg II – Landkreis Rostock I is an electoral constituency (German: Wahlkreis) represented in the Bundestag. It elects one member via first-past-the-post voting. Under the current constituency numbering system, it is designated as constituency 13. It is located in western Mecklenburg-Vorpommern, comprising the eastern parts of the districts of Ludwigslust-Parchim and Nordwestmecklenburg, and the northwestern part of Landkreis Rostock.

Ludwigslust-Parchim II – Nordwestmecklenburg II – Landkreis Rostock I was created for the 2002 federal election. From 2021 to 2025, it was represented by Frank Junge of the Social Democratic Party (SPD). Since 2025 it has been represented by Christoph Grimm of the AfD.

== Geography ==
Ludwigslust-Parchim II – Nordwestmecklenburg II – Landkreis Rostock I is located in western Mecklenburg-Vorpommern. As of the 2021 federal election, it comprises the western parts of Ludwigslust-Parchim district (specifically the municipality of Parchim and the Ämter of Crivitz, Eldenburg Lübz, Goldberg-Mildenitz, Parchimer Umland, Plau am See, and Sternberger Seenlandschaft) and Nordwestmecklenburg (specifically the municipalities of Grevesmühlen, Poel, and Wismar, and the Ämter of Dorf Mecklenburg-Bad Kleinen, Grevesmühlen-Land, Klützer Winkel, Neuburg, and Neukloster-Warin), as well as northwestern parts of Landkreis Rostock (specifically the municipalities of Bad Doberan, Kröpelin, Kühlungsborn, Neubukow, and Satow and the Ämter of Bad Doberan-Land and Neubukow-Salzhaff).

== History ==
Ludwigslust-Parchim II – Nordwestmecklenburg II – Landkreis Rostock I was created in 2002, then known as Wismar – Nordwestmecklenburg – Parchim. It contained parts of the abolished constituencies of Wismar – Gadebusch – Grevesmühlen – Doberan – Bützow, Schwerin – Hagenow, and Güstrow – Sternberg – Lübz – Parchim – Ludwigslust. Until 2013, it was constituency 12 in the numbering system. Originally, it comprised the now-abolished independent city of Wismar, the district of Nordwestmecklenburg, and the now-abolished district of Parchim. In the 2013 election, it lost the Ämter of Gadebusch, Lützow-Lübstorf, Rehna, and Schönberger Land from the Nordwestmecklenburg district, while it gained northwestern parts of Landkreis Rostock; it also acquired its current name and constituency number.

Election	No.	Name	Borders
2002	12	Wismar – Nordwestmecklenburg – Parchim	Wismar city; Nordwestmecklenburg district; Parchim district
2005	12	Wismar – Nordwestmecklenburg – Parchim	Wismar city; Nordwestmecklenburg district; Parchim district
2009	12	Wismar – Nordwestmecklenburg – Parchim	Wismar city; Nordwestmecklenburg district; Parchim district
2013	13	Ludwigslust-Parchim II – Nordwestmecklenburg II – Landkreis Rostock I	Ludwigslust-Parchim district (only Parchim municipality and Crivitz Amt, Eldenburg Lübz Amt, Goldberg-Mildenitz Amt, Parchimer Umland Amt, Plau am See Amt, and Sternberger Seenlandschaft Amt); Nordwestmecklenburg district (only Grevesmühlen, Poel, and Wismar municipalities and Dorf Mecklenburg-Bad Kleinen Amt, Grevesmühlen-Land Amt, Klützer Winkel Amt, Neuburg Amt, and Neukloster-Warin Amt); Landkreis Rostock district (only Bad Doberan, Kröpelin, Kühlungsborn, Neubukow, and Satow municipalities and Bad Doberan-Land Amt and Neubukow-Salzhaff Amt)
2017	13	Ludwigslust-Parchim II – Nordwestmecklenburg II – Landkreis Rostock I	
2021	13	Ludwigslust-Parchim II – Nordwestmecklenburg II – Landkreis Rostock I	
2025	13	Ludwigslust-Parchim II – Nordwestmecklenburg II – Landkreis Rostock I	

== Members ==
The constituency was held by the Social Democratic Party (SPD) from its creation in 2002 until 2009, during which time it was represented by Iris Hoffmann. It was won by the Christian Democratic Union (CDU) in 2009, and represented by Karin Strenz. She was re-elected in 2013 and 2017. Frank Junge won the constituency for the SPD In 2021.

Election	Member	Party	%
2002	Iris Hoffmann	SPD	47.4
2005	Iris Hoffmann	SPD	37.8
2009	Karin Strenz	CDU	33.7
2013	Karin Strenz	CDU	43.0
2017	Karin Strenz	CDU	30.0
2021	Frank Junge	SPD	35.2
2025	Christoph Grimm	AfD	36.9

== Election results ==
=== 2025 election ===
Federal election (2025): Ludwigslust-Parchim II – Nordwestmecklenburg II – Landkreis Rostock I
Notes:	Blue background denotes the winner of the electorate vote. Pink background denotes a candidate elected from their party list. Yellow background denotes an electorate win by a list member, or other incumbent. A ✓ or ✗ denotes status of any incumbent, win or lose respectively.						
Party	Candidate	Votes	%	±%	Party votes	%	±%
AfD	Christoph Grimm	59,416	36.9	▲19.7	56,236	34.8	▲17.7
SPD	✗ Frank Junge	34,654	21.5	▼13.7	23,009	14.2	▼18.3
CDU	Simone Borchardt	32,839	20.4	▲2.2	29,812	18.4	▲1.3
Left	Horst Krumpen	18,094	11.2	▲0.8	17,339	10.7	▲0.3
BSW					16,992	10.5	New
FW	Karl Kessner	6,054	3.8	▲1.3	1,875	1.2	▼0.5
Greens	Sebastian Hüller	5,747	3.6	▼2.1	7,744	4.8	▼2.3
FDP	Jens Kaufmann	4,422	2.7	▼4.4	4,921	3.0	▼5.0
Tierschutzpartei					2,238	1.4	▼0.4
Volt					997	0.6	▲0.4
BD					461	0.3	New
MLPD					99	0.1	0.0
Informal votes		1,663			1,166		
Total valid votes		161,226			161,723		
Turnout		162,889	80.5	▲9.1			
AfD gain from SPD	Majority	24,762	15.4	N/A			

=== 2021 election ===
Federal election (2021): Ludwigslust-Parchim II – Nordwestmecklenburg II – Landkreis Rostock I
Notes:	Blue background denotes the winner of the electorate vote. Pink background denotes a candidate elected from their party list. Yellow background denotes an electorate win by a list member, or other incumbent. A ✓ or ✗ denotes status of any incumbent, win or lose respectively.						
Party	Candidate	Votes	%	±%	Party votes	%	±%
SPD	Frank Junge	50,736	35.2	▲11.3	46,846	32.5	▲15.3
CDU	Simone Borchardt	26,208	18.2	▼11.8	24,621	17.1	▼16.6
AfD	Andreas-Michael Mrachacz	24,760	17.2	▼0.2	24,673	17.1	▼0.6
Left	Judith Keller	14,949	10.4	▼5.8	14,979	10.4	▼6.4
FDP	Daniel Bohl	10,322	7.2	▲1.4	11,638	8.1	▲1.9
Greens	Martin Mölau	8,163	5.7	▲1.6	10,147	7.0	▲3.2
FW	Torsten Neitzel	3,531	2.5	▲0.7	2,384	1.7	▲0.8
dieBasis	Stephanie Zajonc	2,796	1.9		2,610	1.8	
Independent	Rainer Löwe	2,581	1.8				
Tierschutzpartei					2,562	1.8	▲0.5
PARTEI					1,019	0.7	▼0.1
NPD					889	0.6	▼0.5
Pirates					624	0.4	
Team Todenhöfer					332	0.2	
Volt					254	0.2	
ÖDP					195	0.1	0.0
Humanists					157	0.1	
DKP					109	0.1	
MLPD					65	0.0	▼0.1
Informal votes		2,316			2,258		
Total valid votes		144,046			144,104		
Turnout		146,362	71.4	▲0.1			
SPD gain from CDU	Majority	24,528	17.0				

=== 2017 election ===
Federal election (2017): Ludwigslust-Parchim II – Nordwestmecklenburg II – Landkreis Rostock I
Notes:	Blue background denotes the winner of the electorate vote. Pink background denotes a candidate elected from their party list. Yellow background denotes an electorate win by a list member, or other incumbent. A ✓ or ✗ denotes status of any incumbent, win or lose respectively.						
Party	Candidate	Votes	%	±%	Party votes	%	±%
CDU	✓ Karin Strenz	43,453	30.0	▼13.0	48,841	33.7	▼8.4
SPD	Frank Junge	34,705	24.0	▲1.2	25,029	17.2	▼2.5
AfD	Christoph Grimm	25,262	17.4		25,688	17.7	▲12.4
Left	Horst Krumpen	23,433	16.2	▼6.7	24,409	16.8	▼4.5
FDP	Chris Rehhagen	8,290	5.7	▲4.1	9,008	6.2	▲4.0
Greens	Claudia Schulz	5,858	4.0	▲0.6	5,521	3.8	▼0.2
FW	Gustav Graf von Westarp	2,573	1.8	▲0.7	1,216	0.8	0.0
Tierschutzpartei					1,807	1.2	
NPD	Rainer Schütt	1,264	0.9	▼2.3	1,642	1.1	▼1.4
PARTEI					1,188	0.8	
BGE					355	0.2	
ÖDP					213	0.1	
MLPD					194	0.1	0.0
Informal votes		1,930			1,657		
Total valid votes		144,838			145,111		
Turnout		146,768	71.3	▲5.7			
CDU hold	Majority	8,748	6.0	▼14.1			

=== 2013 election ===
Federal election (2013): Ludwigslust-Parchim II – Nordwestmecklenburg II – Landkreis Rostock I
Notes:	Blue background denotes the winner of the electorate vote. Pink background denotes a candidate elected from their party list. Yellow background denotes an electorate win by a list member, or other incumbent. A ✓ or ✗ denotes status of any incumbent, win or lose respectively.						
Party	Candidate	Votes	%	±%	Party votes	%	±%
CDU	✓ Karin Strenz	57,917	43.0	▲9.4	56,922	42.1	▲9.4
Left	Martina Bunge	30,812	22.9	▼6.8	28,803	21.3	▼7.3
SPD	Frank Junge	30,711	22.8	▲1.9	26,641	19.7	▲1.3
AfD					7,138	5.3	
Greens	Ulrike Seemann-Katz	4,641	3.4	▼1.4	5,448	4.0	▼1.2
NPD	Stefan Köster	4,244	3.1	0.0	3,465	2.6	▼0.3
Pirates	Dennis Klüver	2,964	2.2		2,126	1.6	▼0.4
FDP	René Domke	2,125	1.6	▼5.9	3,006	2.2	▼7.5
FW	Gustav Graf von Westarp	1,398	1.0		1,106	0.8	
PRO					291	0.2	
MLPD					153	0.1	▼0.1
REP					86	0.1	▼0.1
Informal votes		2,359			1,986		
Total valid votes		134,812			135,185		
Turnout		137,171	65.6	▲2.2			
CDU hold	Majority	27,105	20.1	▲16.5			

=== 2009 election ===
Federal election (2009): Wismar – Nordwestmecklenburg – Parchim
Notes:	Blue background denotes the winner of the electorate vote. Pink background denotes a candidate elected from their party list. Yellow background denotes an electorate win by a list member, or other incumbent. A ✓ or ✗ denotes status of any incumbent, win or lose respectively.						
Party	Candidate	Votes	%	±%	Party votes	%	±%
CDU	Karin Strenz	45,383	33.7	▲4.7	44,340	32.9	▲4.8
Left	Martina Bunge	40,419	30.1	▲8.2	38,466	28.5	▲6.5
SPD	Stephan Bliemel	27,590	20.5	▼17.2	25,047	18.6	▼16.6
FDP	Martin Broziat	9,969	7.4	▲2.2	12,865	9.5	▲3.3
Greens	Ulrike Seemann-Katz	6,520	4.8	▲2.0	7,139	5.3	▲1.1
NPD	Stefan Köster	3,976	3.0	▼0.4	3,766	2.8	▼0.3
Pirates					2,745	2.0	
Independent	Lutz Kind	618	0.5				
MLPD					246	0.2	▼0.1
REP					195	0.1	
Informal votes		2,448			2,114		
Total valid votes		134,475			134,809		
Turnout		136,923	63.2	▼8.1			
CDU gain from SPD	Majority	4,964	3.7				

=== 2005 election ===
Federal election (2005): Wismar - Northwest Mecklenburg - Parchim
Notes:	Blue background denotes the winner of the electorate vote. Pink background denotes a candidate elected from their party list. Yellow background denotes an electorate win by a list member, or other incumbent. A ✓ or ✗ denotes status of any incumbent, win or lose respectively.						
Party	Candidate	Votes	%	±%	Party votes	%	±%
SPD	✓ Iris Hoffmann	57,998	37.8	▼9.6	54,101	35.2	▼10.4
CDU	Thomas Lenz	44,656	29.1	▼1.1	43,197	28.1	▼0.3
Left	Martina Bunge	33,509	21.8	▲7.0	33,906	22.0	▲7.8
FDP	Peter Manthey	7,999	5.2	▲0.5	9,610	6.2	▲0.7
NPD	Rainer Schütt	5,085	3.3		4,829	3.1	▲2.6
Greens	Anna Seemann-Katz	4,322	2.8	▼0.1	6,446	4.2	▲0.6
GRAUEN					893	0.6	
PBC					403	0.3	
MLPD					404	0.3	
Informal votes		2,989			2,769		
Total valid votes		153,569			153,789		
Turnout		156,558	71.2	▲0.4			
SPD hold	Majority	13,342	8.7				
