= Heinz Kippnick =

German graphic designer and heraldist

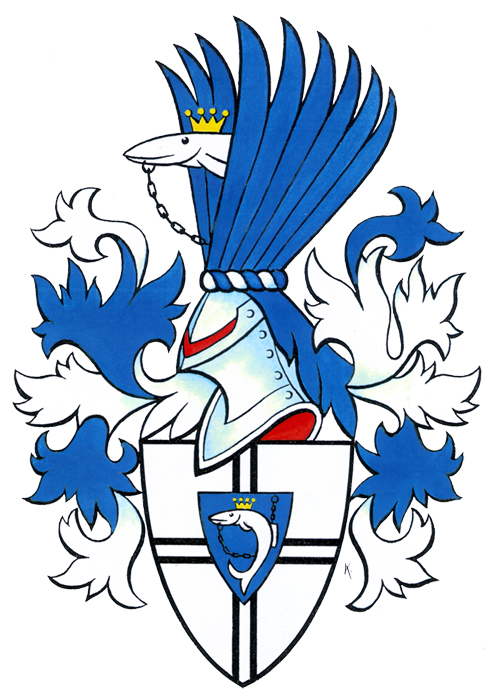
- Family crest designed by Kippnick
- Born: March 7, 1928; Nikolaiken, Free State of Prussia, Weimar Republic
- Died: December 23, 2019 (aged 91); Schwerin, Mecklenburg-Vorpommern, Germany
- Occupation: Graphic designer
- Years active: 1947–2019

Heinz Kippnick (7 May 1928 – 23 December 2019) was a German graphic designer and heraldist.

== Biography ==
Kippnick was born in Nikolaiken, Weimar Republic; on 7 May 1928. During World War II, Kippnick was active in the military which left him wounded. After the war, he settled in Schwerin where he took up an apprenticeship as a poster designer in 1947, which he completed in 1949. He then worked as a poster designer in East Germany until reunification.

Almost 30% of coats of arms in Mecklenburg-Vorpommern were designed or redrawn by him. During the territorial reform in Mecklenburg-Vorpommern of 2011, Kippnick designed the arms of two out of the eight new districts, Ludwigslust-Parchim and Mecklenburgische Seenplatte. He also designed the arms of Nordwestmecklenburg as it existed before the territorial reform, after which the inclusion of Wismar was necessitated and his original design was thus altered.

He was a member of the Federation of Visual Artists in the GDR, which merged into the Association of German Artists after reunification, since 1952.

Kippnick was responsible for managing the state guest book of Mecklenburg-Vorpommern from 1991 until his death in late 2019.

The last coat of arms Kippnick designed was that of the municipality Priepert. He died on 23 December 2019 in Schwerin at the age of 91.

== Selected works ==
=== Coats of arms ===
This is a selection of arms designed by Kippnick. For more, see: Coats of arms by Heinz Kippnick.

Alt Bukow

Bastorf

Dahmen

Vielist

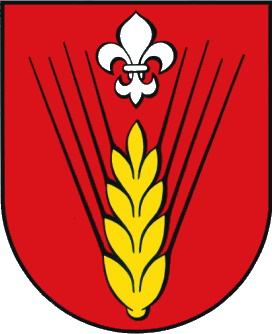
Glasin

Ludwigslust-Parchim

Nordwestmecklenburg (until 2011)

Mecklenburgische Seenplatte

Pinnow

Muchow

Wulkenzin

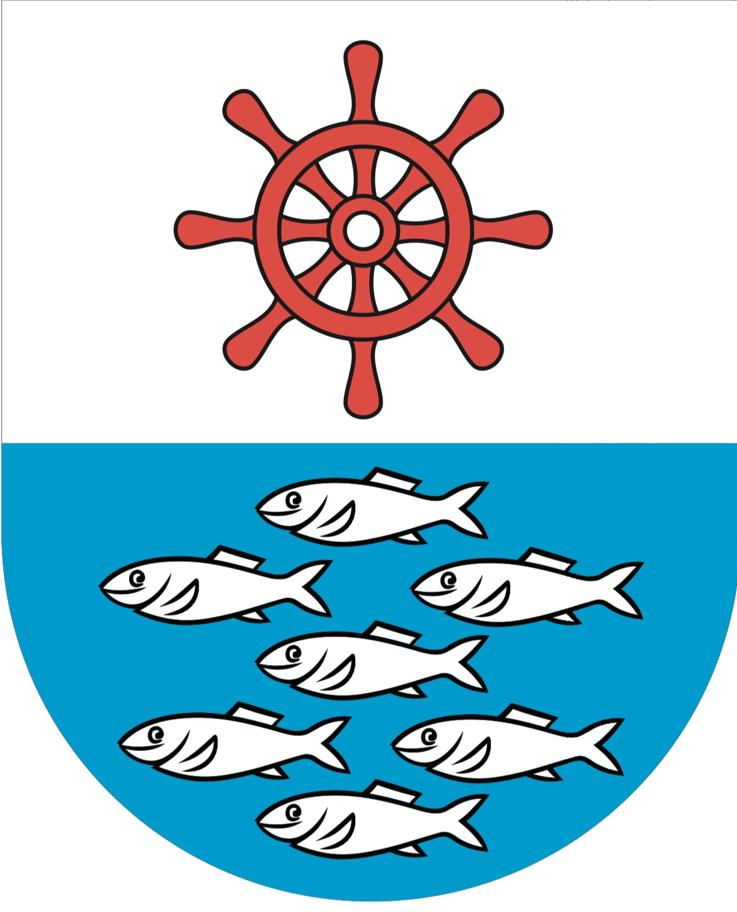
Priepert

=== Flags ===
This is a selection of flags designed by Kippnick. For more, see: Flags by Heinz Kippnick.

Boizenburg

Dömitz

Grabow

Lübesse

Techentin

Kemnitz

Lübtheen

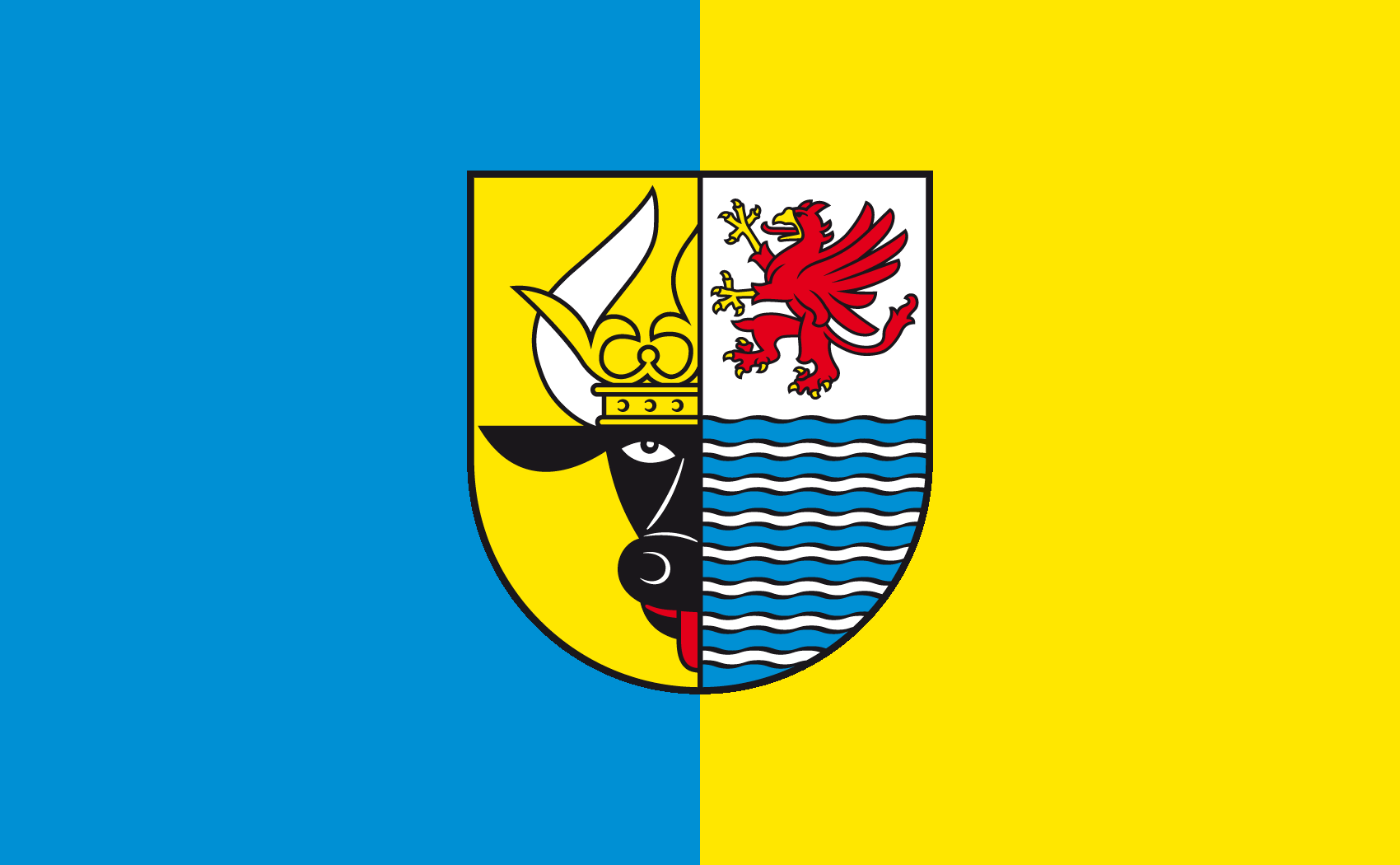
Mecklenburgische Seenplatte

=== Posters ===
- Eltern achtet darauf (1950s)
- Landwirtschafts- und Gartenbauausstellung Schwerin (1957)
- Qualität geht jeden an! (1980)
