= Maika Friemann-Jennert =

German politician

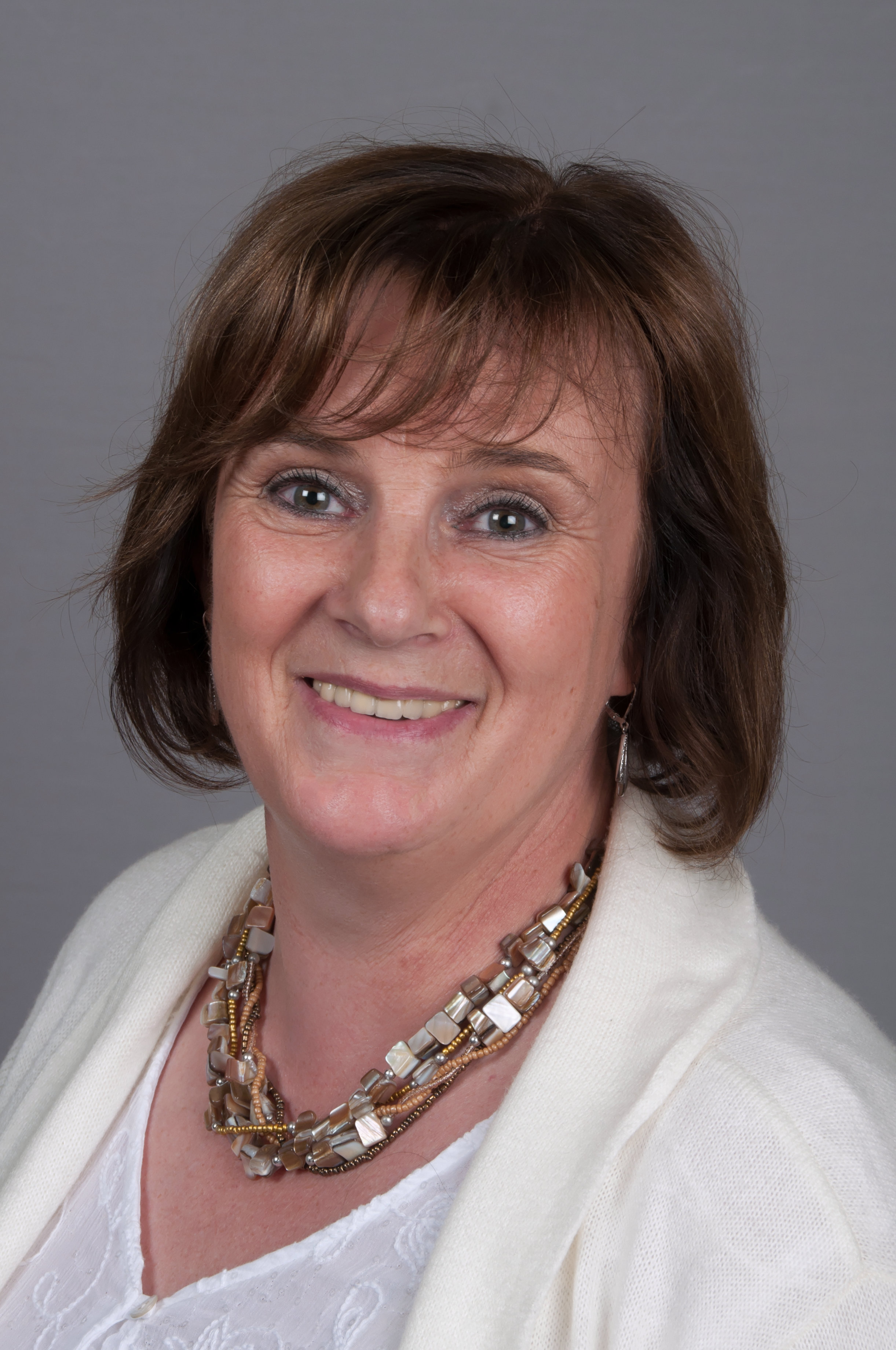
- Friemann-Jennert in 2017

Member of the Bundestag; for Ludwigslust-Parchim II – Nordwestmecklenburg II – Landkreis Rostock I
- In office 7 April 2021 – 26 October 2021
- Preceded by: Karin Strenz
- Succeeded by: Frank Junge

Member of the; Landtag of Mecklenburg-Vorpommern
- In office October 2011 – 7 April 2021
- Preceded by: Multi-member district
- Succeeded by: Thomas Grote
- Constituency: State list
- In office 3 January 2006 – October 2006
- Preceded by: Eckhardt Rehberg
- Succeeded by: Werner Kuhn
- Constituency: Nordvorpommern I

Personal details
- Born: 24 June 1964 (age 62) Ludwigslust, East Germany
- Party: Christian Democratic Union

Maika Friemann-Jennert (born 24 June 1964) is a German politician of the CDU who has been serving as a member of the Bundestag from the state of Mecklenburg-Vorpommern from April to October 2021.

== Political career ==
Friemann-Jennert became a member of the Bundestag in 2021 when she replaced Karin Strenz who died. In parliament, she served on the Defence Committee.
