= Kranzberg =

- Municipality
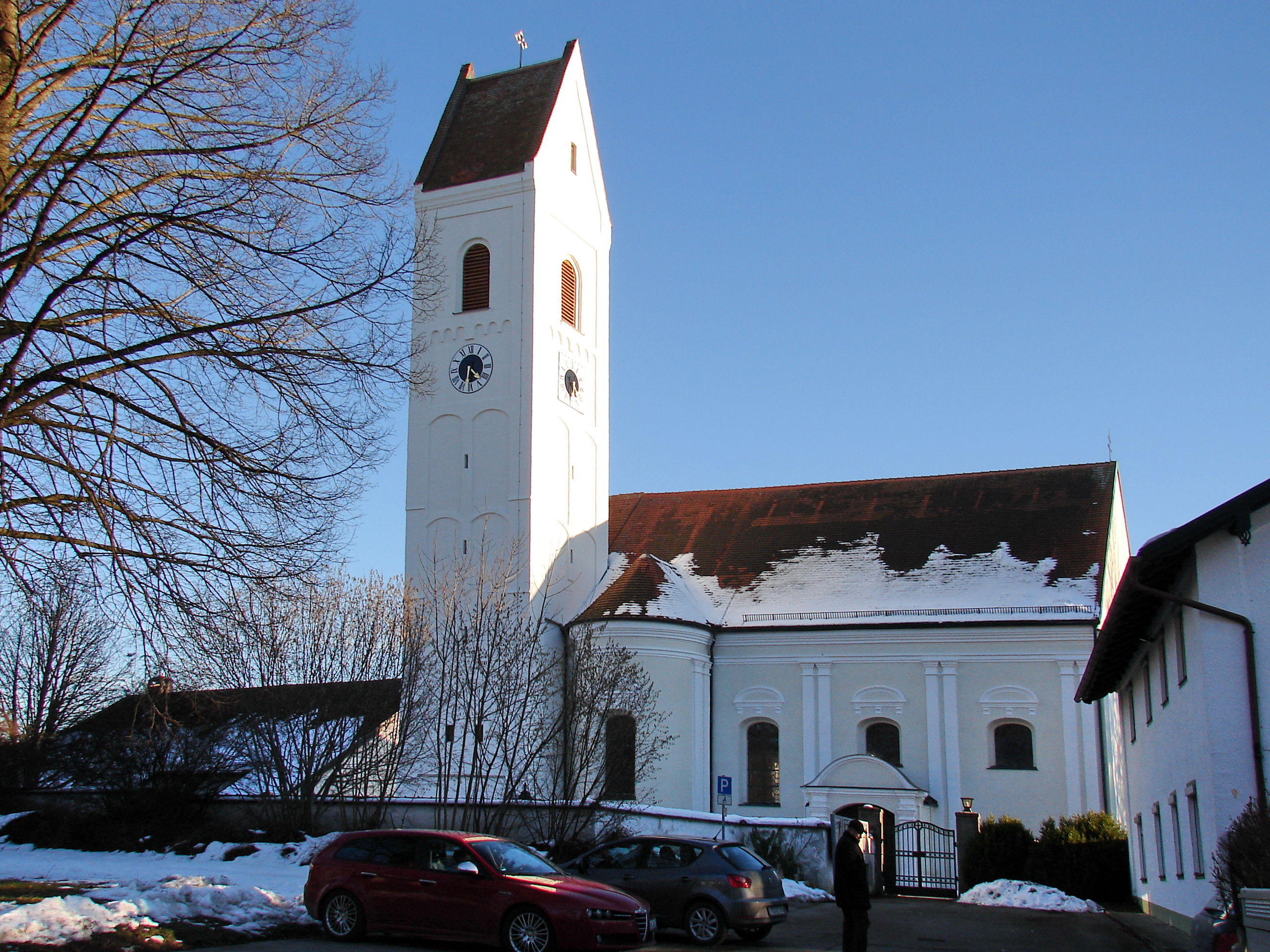
- Church of Saint Quirinus in Kranzberg

- Coat of arms

- Location of Kranzberg within Freising district
- Interactive map of Kranzberg
- Location within Germany Location within Bavaria
- Coordinates: 48°24′N 11°37′E
- Country: Germany
- State: Bavaria
- Admin. region: Oberbayern
- District: Freising

Government
  - Mayor (2020–26): Hermann Hammerl (FW)

Area
  - Total: 39.5 km^{2} (15.3 sq mi)
- Elevation: 483 m (1,585 ft)

Population (2025-12-31)
  - Total: 4,288
  - Density: 109/km^{2} (281/sq mi)
- Time zone: UTC+01:00 (CET)
  - Summer (DST): UTC+02:00 (CEST)
- Postal codes: 85402
- Dialling codes: 08166
- Vehicle registration: FS
- Website: www.kranzberg.de

Kranzberg (German pronunciation: [ˈkʁantsbɛʁk]) is a municipality in the district of Freising in Bavaria in Germany.

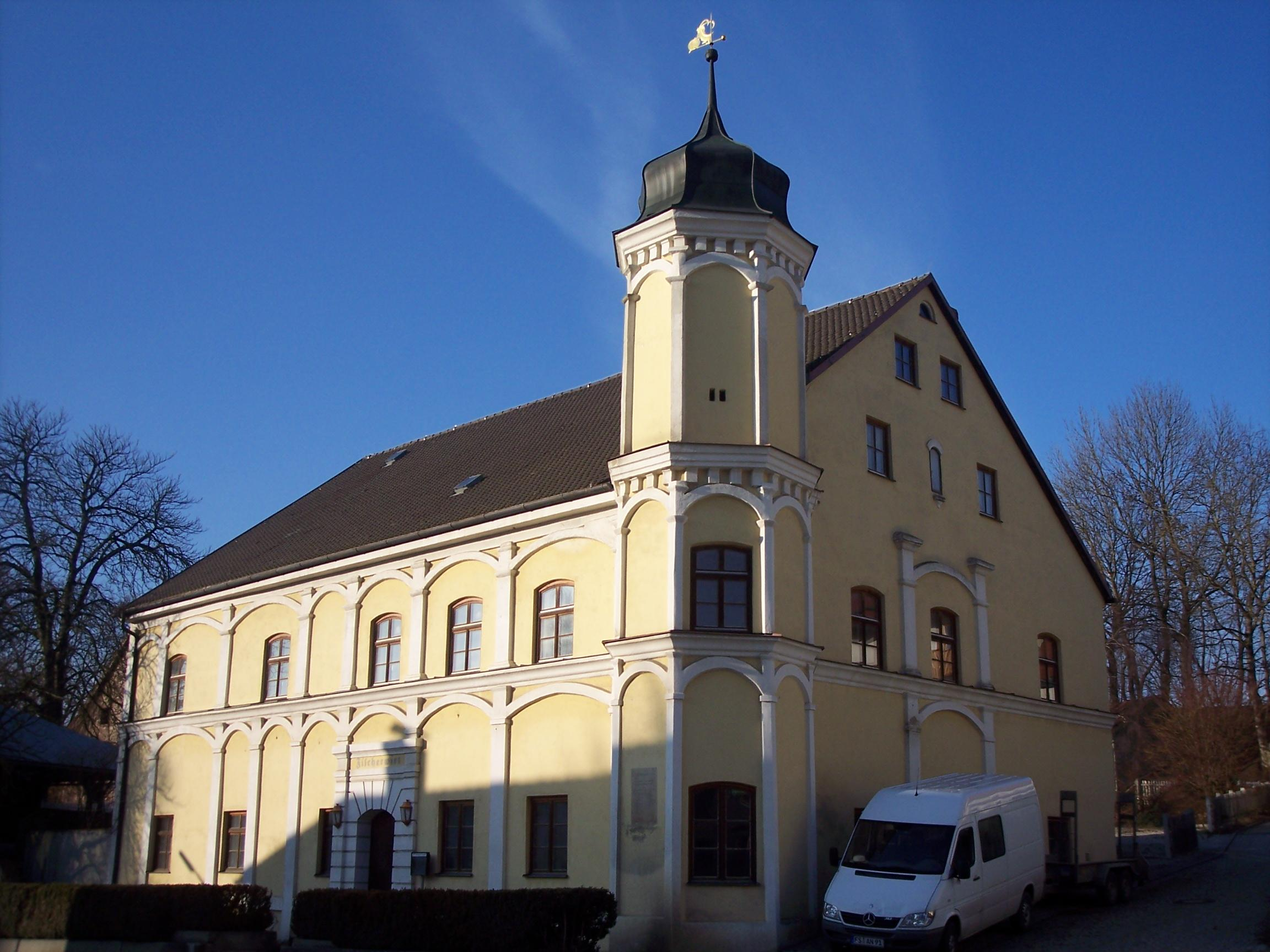
Fischerwirt in Kranzberg, this baroque building was a district court house until 1803 when the court was moved to Freising.

At Bernstorf, a part within the municipality of Kranzberg, a Bronze Age fortification was found in 1904 by local historian Josef Wenzl. It was dated at around 1360 B.C. and is the largest known Bronze Age settlement north of the Alps. Most significant were finds of gold and amber objects which contained writings in Mycenaean Greek Linear B. These objects were found by amateur archaeologists Manfred Moosauer and Traudl Bachmair in 1998. The objects are now kept in the national Bavarian archaeological collection in Munich.
