= Biendorf =

Biendorf refers to the following places in Germany:

- Biendorf, Mecklenburg-Vorpommern
- Biendorf, Saxony-Anhalt
