= Christoph Grimm =

German politician (born 1957)

Christoph Grimm MdB
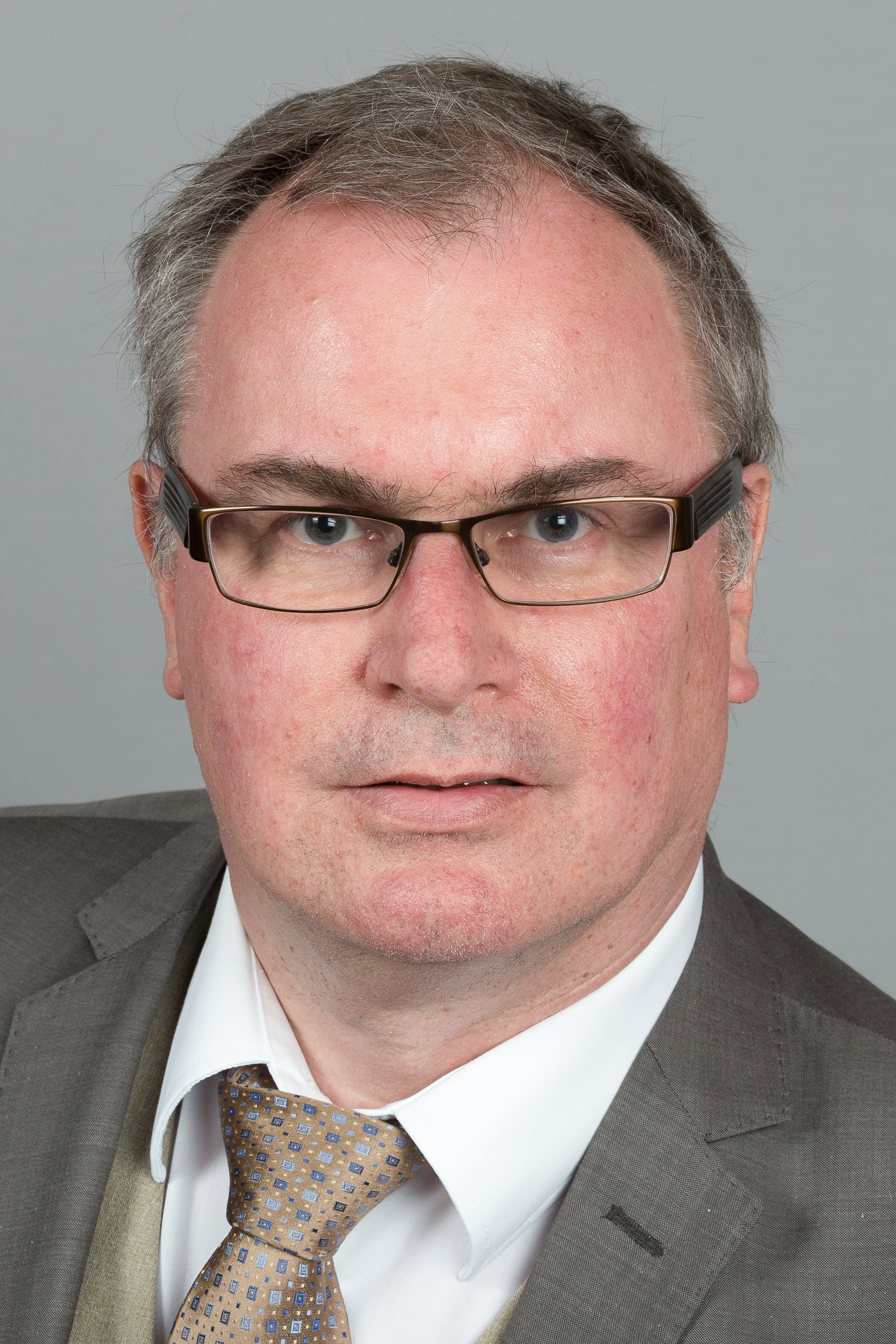
- Grimm in 2017

Member of the Bundestag; for Ludwigslust-Parchim II – Nordwestmecklenburg II – Landkreis Rostock I
- Incumbent
- Assumed office 25 March 2025
- Preceded by: Frank Junge

Member of the; Landtag of Mecklenburg-Vorpommern
- In office 4 October 2016 – 26 October 2021
- Constituency: State list

Personal details
- Born: Christoph Herbert Walter Grimm; 3 April 1957 (age 69) Frankfurt, West Germany
- Party: Alternative for Germany (since 2013)
- Other political affiliations: SPD (1980–2013)
- Education: University of Hamburg

Christoph Grimm (born 3 April 1957) is a German lawyer and politician from the Alternative for Germany (AfD).

== Early life and career ==
Grimm grew up in Quickborn, graduated from high school in 1980 and then studied law at the University of Hamburg. After his studies, he became a lawyer. From 1993 to 1998, he worked as a freelancer on behalf of the Ministry of Justice in Grevesmühlen, helping to set up the local administration. His duties included the return of assets to former GDR citizens who had moved to the Federal Republic of Germany. An attempt to sue for a permanent position on the grounds that he had been bogusly self-employed failed in court. He then worked as a freelance lawyer, first in Hamburg and then in Dassow.

== Political career ==
In 1980 he joined the Jusos and the Social Democratic Party of Germany (SPD). In 2013 he left the SPD and became one of the co-founders of the AfD.

In the 2016 Mecklenburg-Vorpommern state election, he stood as a candidate in 6th place on the AfD state list and was thus able to enter the state parliament. He did not stand again in the 2021 state election and thus left the state parliament.

In the 2017 German federal election, Grimm ran unsuccessfully in the Ludwigslust-Parchim II – Nordwestmecklenburg II – Rostock I constituency and was ranked 6th on the AfD state list. In the 2025 federal election, he stood again in the same constituency and was elected receiving a direct mandate with 36.9% of the first vote.

== Personal life ==
Grimm is married.

== Literature ==
- Raphael Thelen und Hannes Jung: Christoph Grimm : Das Herz links, der Blick rechts; in: Die Zeit vom 31. August 2016 (online).
