= Simone Borchardt =

German politician

Member of the Bundestag
- Incumbent
- Assumed office 2021

Personal details
- Born: 11 September 1967 (age 58) Leipzig
- Party: CDU

Simone Borchardt (born 11 September 1967 in Leipzig or Schkeuditz) is a German politician of the Christian Democratic Union (CDU) who has been serving as member of the Bundestag since 2021.

== Life ==
Borchardt studied at the Leipzig University of Education from 1987 to 1992, aiming to become a teacher at secondary level I. She graduated with the first state examination. She also completed further training as a health insurance business administrator from 2001 to 2003 and a master's distance learning program in health management at Wismar University of Applied Sciences between 2018 and 2020. After completing her first degree, she held various positions at Barmer Ersatzkasse from 1992. From January 2012 to April 2017, she was the regional managing director of Barmer in Schwerin, having previously held the deputy position since 2007. After working briefly for Barmer in Rostock, she was a health policy officer at Barmer's regional office in Hamburg from September 2018. In June 2019, she moved to the International Federation, where she became head of the nursing division and management representative for PWG gGmbH. Simone Borchardt is divorced and has two children. She lives in the municipality of Warnow (near Grevesmühlen). She is of the Evangelical Lutheran denomination.

== Political activities ==
Borchardt has been a member of the CDU since 2013. In 2016, she stood for the party in the Schwerin mayoral election, in which she received 18.2 per cent of the vote and came in third. In the 2021 Bundestag election, Simone Borchardt stood in the Bundestag constituency of Ludwigslust-Parchim II - Nordwestmecklenburg II - Landkreis Rostock I, where she came second with 18.2 per cent of the first-place vote. She entered the 20th German Bundestag via the state list, on which she was ranked third. She is a member of the Petitions Committee. She is a member of the Petitions Committee and the Health Committee.

== Political positions ==
In April 2023, she was one of two CDU/CSU parliamentary group members to vote to set up a committee of inquiry into the Coronavirus at the request of the AfD parliamentary group in the Bundestag.

== Memberships ==
Within the CDU in 2021, Borchardt is the district chairwoman of the Women's Union of Northwest Mecklenburg and a member of the Union of Small and Medium-Sized Businesses and the Economy.
