= Krusenhagen =

- Municipality
- Location of Krusenhagen within Nordwestmecklenburg district
- Interactive map of Krusenhagen
- Location within Germany Location within Mecklenburg-Vorpommern
- Coordinates: 53°57′N 11°31′E
- Country: Germany
- State: Mecklenburg-Vorpommern
- District: Nordwestmecklenburg
- Municipal assoc.: Neuburg

Government
  - Mayor: Harry Haker

Area
  - Total: 11.21 km^{2} (4.33 sq mi)
- Elevation: 29 m (95 ft)

Population (2025-12-31)
  - Total: 589
  - Density: 52.5/km^{2} (136/sq mi)
- Time zone: UTC+01:00 (CET)
  - Summer (DST): UTC+02:00 (CEST)
- Postal codes: 23974
- Dialling codes: 03841
- Vehicle registration: NWM
- Website: www.amt-neuburg.de

Krusenhagen is a municipality in the Nordwestmecklenburg district, in Mecklenburg-Vorpommern, Germany.
