= Glasin =

- Municipality
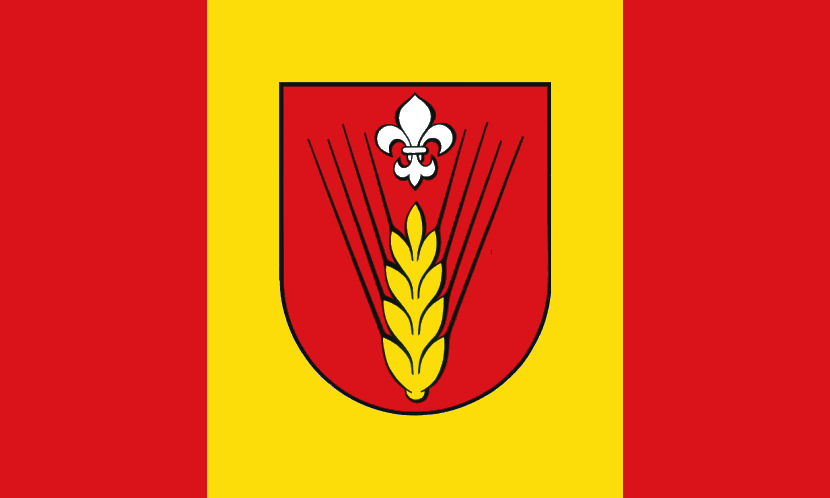
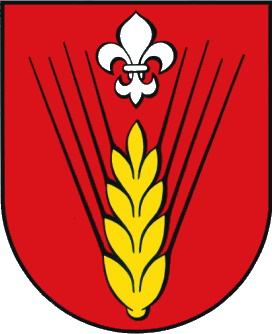
- Flag Coat of arms

- Location of Glasin within Nordwestmecklenburg district
- Interactive map of Glasin
- Location within Germany Location within Mecklenburg-Vorpommern
- Coordinates: 53°55′N 11°44′E
- Country: Germany
- State: Mecklenburg-Vorpommern
- District: Nordwestmecklenburg
- Municipal assoc.: Neukloster-Warin

Government
  - Mayor: Joachim Wittke

Area
  - Total: 39.34 km^{2} (15.19 sq mi)
- Elevation: 75 m (246 ft)

Population (2025-12-31)
  - Total: 790
  - Density: 20/km^{2} (52/sq mi)
- Time zone: UTC+01:00 (CET)
  - Summer (DST): UTC+02:00 (CEST)
- Postal codes: 23992
- Dialling codes: 038429
- Vehicle registration: NWM
- Website: www.neukloster.de

Glasin is a municipality in the Nordwestmecklenburg district, Mecklenburg-Western Pomerania, Germany.

== Geography ==
The municipality of Glasin borders on the district of Rostock in the east. It is located in an end moraine area, which extends from Kühlungsborn to the area of the upper Warnow river. The "Fuchsberg" is the highest point of this municipality, with a total height of 341.2 feet (104m) above sea level. In the south, the municipality of Glasin borders on Lake Gross Tessin. Glasin is approx. 14 miles (22 km) east of the Hanseatic League City Wismar and 29 miles (46 km) southwest of the Hanseatic League City Rostock.

=== Organization of the municipality ===
The municipality of Glasin includes the following villages:

- Babst (became a part of the municipality of Glasin on January 1, 2001)
- Gross Tessin (became a part of the municipality of Glasin on January 1, 2001)
- Perniek
- Pinnowhof
- Poischendorf
- Strameuss (became a part of the municipality of Glasin on January 1, 2001)
- Warnkenhagen

== History ==
Glasin was first mentioned in 1248, Babst in 1267.

== Politics ==
Mayor is Mr. Joachim Wittke, who has been elected several times.

== Economy ==
The kindergarten "Gaensebluemchen", a restaurant (which is available for private parties only) and a voluntary fire department are located in Glasin.

Beside agricultural businesses, there are some very small trade businesses, such as a wheelwright's workshop, a corn workshop and a gas station. In Perniek (a part of this municipality) there is open cast mining of gravel/sand granulate.

== Infrastructure ==
Glasin is accessible by car from the Bundesautobahn 20 (Lübeck–Greifswald) exit 11 Neukloster/Glasin. The nearest railroad station is Steinhausen-Neuburg in Neuburg, served by local trains between Rostock and Wismar. The nearest airport is Rostock Laage Airport (31 miles/50 km).
