= Neubukow-Salzhaff =

- Amt
- Map of Rostock highlighting Neubukow-Salzhaff
- Interactive map of Neubukow-Salzhaff
- Location within Germany Location within Mecklenburg-Vorpommern
- Coordinates: 54°03′N 11°40′E
- Country: Germany
- State: Mecklenburg-Vorpommern
- District: Rostock
- Seat: Neubukow
- Subdivisions: 6 municipalities

Area
  - Total: 183.06 km^{2} (70.68 sq mi)

Population (2025-12-31)
  - Total: 7,016
  - Density: 38.33/km^{2} (99.26/sq mi)
- Time zone: UTC+01:00 (CET)
  - Summer (DST): UTC+02:00 (CEST)
- Website: www.neubukow-salzhaff.de

Neubukow-Salzhaff is an Amt in the district of Rostock, in Mecklenburg-Vorpommern, Germany. The seat of the Amt is in Neubukow, itself is not part of the Amt.

The Amt Neubukow-Salzhaff consists of the following municipalities:

1. Alt Bukow
2. Am Salzhaff
3. Bastorf
4. Biendorf
5. Carinerland
6. Rerik

== History ==
As a precursor, Neubukow-Land was formed as an administrative community in 1991, and was renamed an Amt a year later. At that time, the municipalities of Alt Bukow, Jörnstorf, Kamin, Kirch Mulsow, Krempin, Pepelow, Rakow, Ravensberg and Westenbrügge belonged to the Amt. In 1993, the municipalities of Roggow, Biendorf and Bastorf as well as the town of Rerik from the Salzhaff administrative community were added, and the Amt was renamed "Neubukow-Salzhaff”.

On July 1, 1998, the community of Jörnstorf joined Biendorf, and the community of Roggow was integrated into the town of Rerik on January 1, 2002. On March 15, 2004, the communities of Kamin, Karin (from the former Kröpelin office ), Krempin and Ravensberg merged to form the new community of Carinerland . On June 13, 2004, the municipalities of Pepelow and Rakow merged to form the new municipality of Am Salzhaff and Westenbrügge was incorporated into the municipality of Biendorf . On May 26, 2019, the community of Kirch Mulsow became part of Carinerland.
