= Karin Strenz =

German politician (1967–2021)

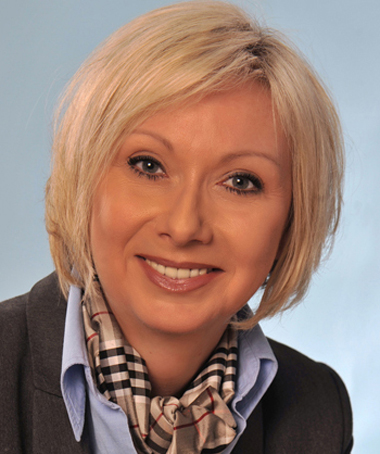
- Strenz in 2009

Member of the Bundestag
- In office 27 October 2009 – 21 March 2021
- Preceded by: Iris Hoffmann
- Succeeded by: Maika Friemann-Jennert
- Constituency: Wismar – Nordwestmecklenburg – Parchim (2009–2013); Ludwigslust-Parchim II – Nordwestmecklenburg II – Landkreis Rostock I (2013–2021)

Member of the; Landtag of Mecklenburg-Vorpommern
- In office 5 November 2007 – 9 November 2009
- Preceded by: Kerstin Fiedler-Wilhelm
- Succeeded by: André Specht
- Constituency: Uecker-Randow I
- In office 22 October 2002 – 16 October 2006
- Constituency: State list

Personal details
- Born: Karin Hellwig; 14 October 1967 Lübz, East Germany
- Died: 21 March 2021 (aged 53) Limerick, Ireland
- Party: Christian Democratic Union
- Spouse: Kurt Strenz (m. 1995)
- Children: 2
- Education: Goethe University Frankfurt

Karin Strenz (née Hellwig; 14 October 1967 – 21 March 2021) was a German politician who represented the CDU. Strenz served as a member of the Bundestag for the state of Mecklenburg-Vorpommern between 2009 and 2021.

== Career ==
Strenz was born in Lübz, Mecklenburg-Vorpommern. She became member of the Bundestag after the 2009 German federal election and was a member of the defense committee. Strenz was implicated in the Azerbaijani laundromat scandal. Subsequently her parliamentary immunity was lifted and several locations in Germany and Belgium were searched in January 2020.

== Azerbaijan connection ==
Strenz was a central figure in the political scandal involving bribery from Azerbaijan that emerged in the mid-2010s. In 2021, she was fined for accepting bribes.

Strenz first traveled to Azerbaijan as an election observer in 2010, where she held discussions with the then-CSU politician Eduard Lintner regarding the situation on the ground. In 2015, she served as an official election observer there for the Council of Europe. While the OSCE pointed to irregularities in the election, Strenz, by contrast, attested that the election had proceeded in an orderly and fair manner.

Strenz repeatedly advocated for Azerbaijan on the political stage. She received money from Line M-Trade, a company led by Eduard Lintner that is considered a financier of Azerbaijani lobbying efforts.

In 2018 a parlamentarian commission puplished a report in which numerous current and former members of the Parliamentary Assembly of the Council of Europe, including Karin Strenz were suspected of corruption. On June 27, 2018, the relevant body of the Council of Europe imposed a lifetime ban on Strenz and other former members entering the premises.

== Death ==
On 21 March 2021, Strenz fell unconscious during a flight between Cuba and Germany, following which the pilot decided to make an unscheduled landing at Shannon Airport, Ireland. Later she died in University Hospital Limerick, aged 53.
