= Groß Tessiner See =

Lake in Mecklenburg-Vorpommern, Germany

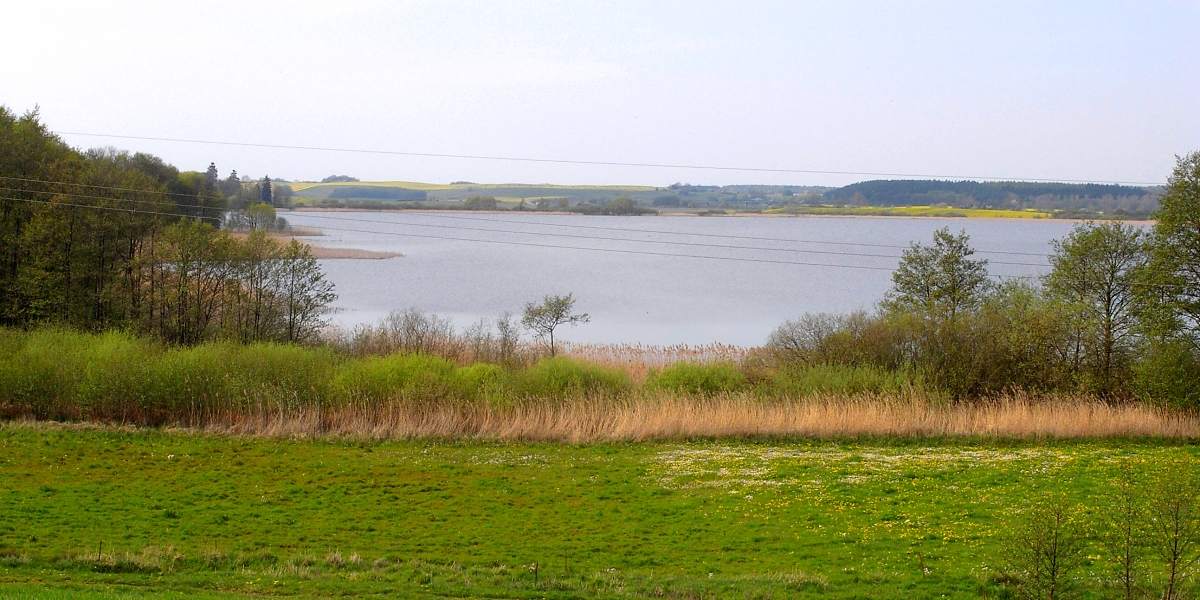

- Location within Mecklenburg-Vorpommern
- Location: Jürgenshagen, Mecklenburg-Vorpommern
- Coordinates: 53°53′45″N 11°47′55″E
- Primary inflows: Stramenußer Graben, Mühlbach
- Primary outflows: Seebach
- Basin countries: Germany
- Surface area: 1.25 km^{2} (0.48 sq mi)
- Max. depth: 12 m (39 ft)
- Surface elevation: 53 m (174 ft)

Groß Tessiner See is a lake in the municipality Jürgenshagen, Mecklenburg-Vorpommern, Germany. At an elevation of 53 m, its surface area is 1.25 km^{2}. It is named after the village Groß Tessin, part of the municipality Glasin, on its western shore.
