= Benz, Nordwestmecklenburg =

Benz
- Municipality
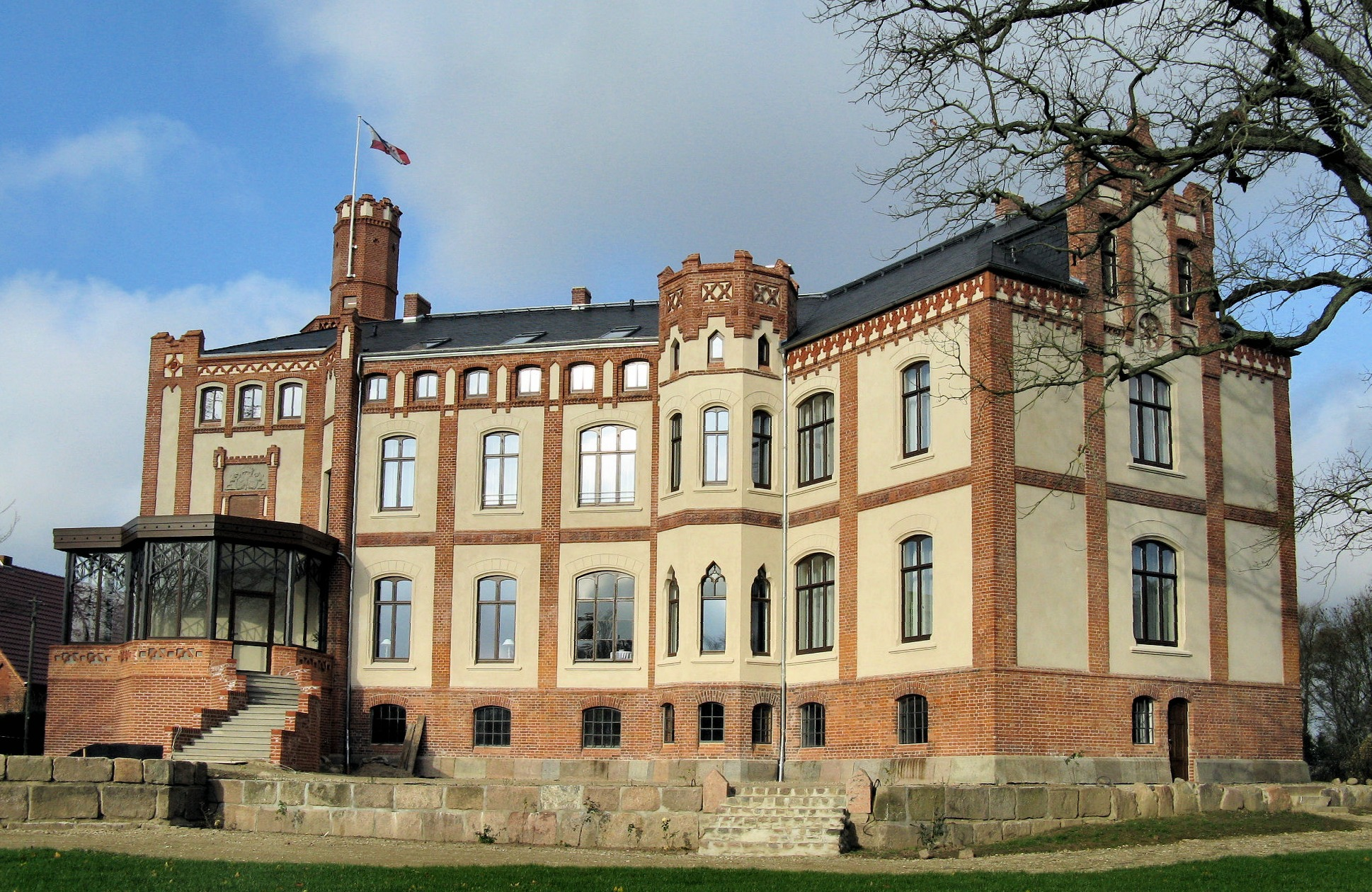
- Herrenhaus Gamehl in Benz

- Location of Benz within Nordwestmecklenburg district
- Interactive map of Benz
- Location within Germany Location within Mecklenburg-Vorpommern
- Coordinates: 53°55′N 11°35′E
- Country: Germany
- State: Mecklenburg-Vorpommern
- District: Nordwestmecklenburg
- Municipal assoc.: Neuburg
- Subdivisions: 5

Government
  - Mayor: Elmar Mehldau

Area
  - Total: 22.58 km^{2} (8.72 sq mi)
- Elevation: 31 m (102 ft)

Population (2025-12-31)
  - Total: 648
  - Density: 28.7/km^{2} (74.3/sq mi)
- Time zone: UTC+01:00 (CET)
  - Summer (DST): UTC+02:00 (CEST)
- Postal codes: 23970
- Dialling codes: 038426
- Vehicle registration: NWM
- Website: www.amt-neuburg.de

Benz is a municipality in the Nordwestmecklenburg district, in Mecklenburg-Vorpommern, Germany.

It has about 640 inhabitants.
