= Testorf-Steinfort =

- Municipality
- Coat of arms

- Location of Testorf-Steinfort within Nordwestmecklenburg district
- Interactive map of Testorf-Steinfort
- Location within Germany Location within Mecklenburg-Vorpommern
- Coordinates: 53°46′N 11°16′E
- Country: Germany
- State: Mecklenburg-Vorpommern
- District: Nordwestmecklenburg
- Municipal assoc.: Grevesmühlen-Land

Government
  - Mayor: Hans-Jürgen Vitense

Area
  - Total: 23.86 km^{2} (9.21 sq mi)
- Elevation: 56 m (184 ft)

Population (2025-12-31)
  - Total: 621
  - Density: 26.0/km^{2} (67.4/sq mi)
- Time zone: UTC+01:00 (CET)
  - Summer (DST): UTC+02:00 (CEST)
- Postal codes: 23936
- Dialling codes: 038822, 038871
- Vehicle registration: NWM
- Website: www.grevesmuehlen.de

Testorf-Steinfort is a municipality in the Nordwestmecklenburg district, in Mecklenburg-Vorpommern, Germany.
