= Am Salzhaff =

- Municipality
- Location of Am Salzhaff within Rostock district
- Interactive map of Am Salzhaff
- Location within Germany Location within Mecklenburg-Vorpommern
- Coordinates: 54°02′N 11°36′E
- Country: Germany
- State: Mecklenburg-Vorpommern
- District: Rostock
- Municipal assoc.: Neubukow-Salzhaff

Government
  - Mayor: Jürgen Weymann

Area
  - Total: 15.45 km^{2} (5.97 sq mi)
- Elevation: 35 m (115 ft)

Population (2025-12-31)
  - Total: 538
  - Density: 34.8/km^{2} (90.2/sq mi)
- Time zone: UTC+01:00 (CET)
  - Summer (DST): UTC+02:00 (CEST)
- Postal codes: 18233
- Dialling codes: 038294
- Vehicle registration: LRO
- Website: neubukow-salzhaff.de

Am Salzhaff is a municipality in the Rostock district, in Mecklenburg-Vorpommern, Germany.
