= Iris Hoffmann =

German politician

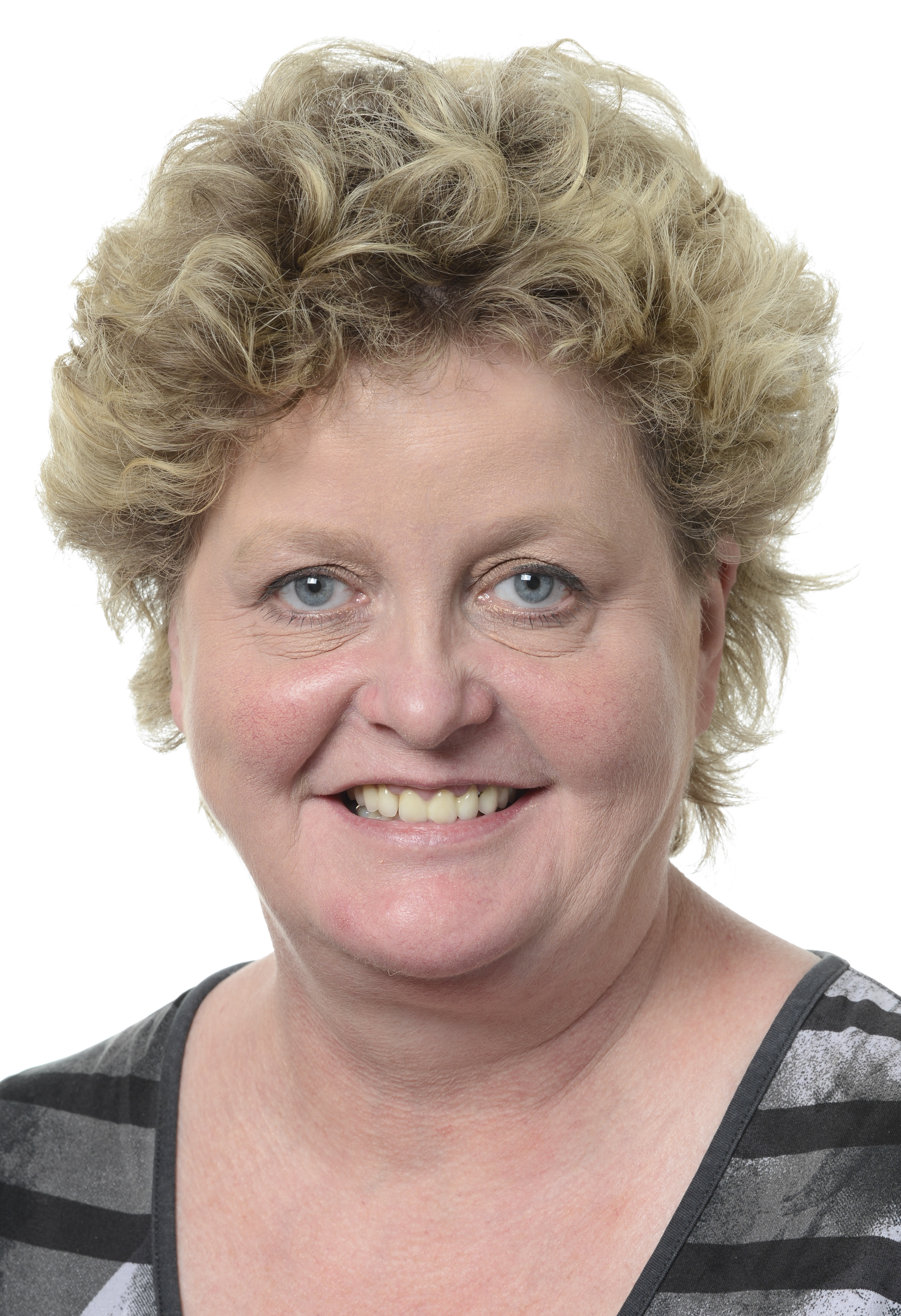
- Official portrait, 2014

Member of the European Parliament; for Germany
- In office 1 July 2014 – 1 July 2019

Member of the Bundestag
- In office 26 October 1998 – 27 October 2009
- Preceded by: Hans-Otto Schmiedeberg
- Succeeded by: Karin Strenz
- Constituency: Wismar – Gadebusch – Grevesmühlen – Doberan – Bützow (1998–2002); Wismar – Nordwestmecklenburg – Parchim (2002–2009)

Personal details
- Born: 29 June 1963 (age 63) Rostock, East Germany
- Party: Social Democratic
- Children: 1
- Education: Gotha Finance College

Iris Hoffmann (born 29 June 1963) is a German politician who served as Member of the European Parliament (MEP) from 2014 until 2019. She is a member of the Social Democratic Party, part of the Party of European Socialists.

Hoffmann served as a Member of the Bundestag from 1998 until 2009.

== Education and early career ==
Hoffmann graduated from the Gotha Finance College in 1990. Prior to entering national politics she worked as a financial administrator, public servant, and local government auditor.

== Political career ==
=== Career in national politics ===
In the 1998 elections, Hoffmann became a member of the Bundestag, serving until 2009. Throughout her time in parliament, she was a member of the Budget Committee. From 2002 until 2015, she als served on the Audit Committee.

Since 2001, Hoffmann has been serving as treasurer of the SPD in Mecklenburg-Vorpommern, currently under the leadership of its chairwoman Manuela Schwesig.

=== Member of the European Parliament ===
- Member, Committee on Budgets (2014–2019)
- Member, Delegation to the Euronest Parliamentary Assembly (2014–2019)
- Member, Delegation to the EU-Armenia and EU-Azerbaijan Parliamentary Cooperation Committees and the EU-Georgia Parliamentary Association Committee (2014–2019)
