= Boiensdorf =

- Municipality
- Location of Boiensdorf within Nordwestmecklenburg district
- Interactive map of Boiensdorf
- Location within Germany Location within Mecklenburg-Vorpommern
- Coordinates: 54°01′N 11°34′E
- Country: Germany
- State: Mecklenburg-Vorpommern
- District: Nordwestmecklenburg
- Municipal assoc.: Neuburg

Government
  - Mayor: Jürgen Frehse

Area
  - Total: 12.68 km^{2} (4.90 sq mi)
- Elevation: 34 m (112 ft)

Population (2025-12-31)
  - Total: 474
  - Density: 37.4/km^{2} (96.8/sq mi)
- Time zone: UTC+01:00 (CET)
  - Summer (DST): UTC+02:00 (CEST)
- Postal codes: 23974
- Dialling codes: 038427
- Vehicle registration: NWM
- Website: www.amt-neuburg.de

Boiensdorf is a municipality in the Nordwestmecklenburg district, in Mecklenburg-Vorpommern, Germany.
