= Helmuth von Moltke the Younger =

Chief of the German General Staff (1848–1916)

Graf Helmuth von Moltke the Younger
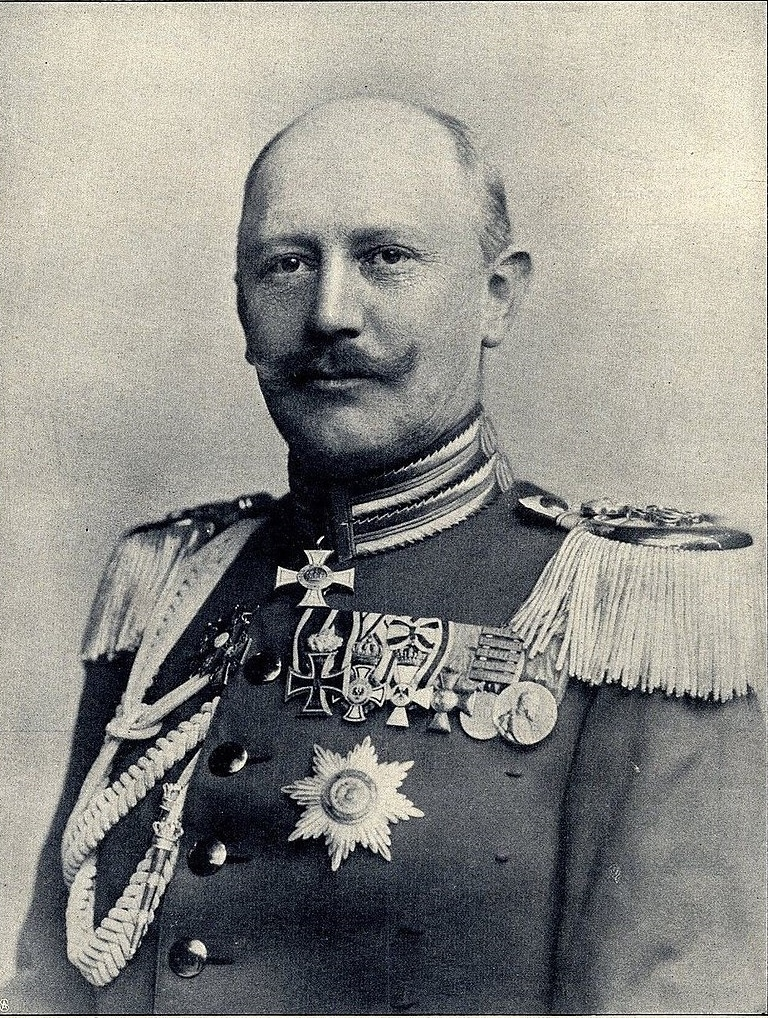
- Moltke in 1906

Chief of the Great General Staff
- In office 1 January 1906 – 14 September 1914
- Monarch: Wilhelm II
- Chancellor: Bernhard von Bülow; Theobald von Bethmann Hollweg
- Preceded by: Alfred von Schlieffen
- Succeeded by: Erich von Falkenhayn

Personal details
- Born: Helmuth Johannes Ludwig von Moltke; 25 May 1848 Biendorf, Grand Duchy of Mecklenburg-Schwerin, German Confederation
- Died: 18 June 1916 (aged 68) Berlin, Province of Brandenburg, Kingdom of Prussia, German Empire
- Resting place: Invalidenfriedhof
- Spouse: Eliza von Moltke-Huitfeldt (m. 1878)
- Parent: Adolf von Moltke (father)
- Relatives: Helmuth von Moltke the Elder (uncle)
- Education: War Academy
- Nickname(s): Moltke the Younger (Moltke der Jüngere)

Military service
- Allegiance: Kingdom of Prussia; German Empire
- Branch/service: Prussian Army
- Years of service: 1868–1916
- Rank: Generaloberst
- Unit: 7th Grenadier Regiment
- Commands: 1st Guards Infantry Brigade; 1st Guards Infantry Division
- Battles/wars: Franco-Prussian War; World War I
- Awards: Pour le Mérite; Order of the Red Eagle; House Order of the Wendish Crown; Royal Victorian Order; Order of the Sword

Graf Helmuth Johannes Ludwig von Moltke (German: [ˈhɛlmuːt fɔn ˈmɔltkə]; 25 May 1848 – 18 June 1916), also known as Moltke the Younger, was a German general and Chief of the Great German General Staff, a member of the House of Moltke. He was also the nephew of Generalfeldmarschall Graf Helmuth von Moltke the Elder, who is commonly called "Moltke the Elder" to differentiate the two.

Upon becoming the head of the General Staff, Moltke led the Imperial German Army from 1 January 1906 to 14 September 1914. When World War I broke out in July 1914, he served as the Army's commander-in-chief during the initial months of the conflict. Moltke the Younger's legacy remains controversial due to his involvement in Germany's decision to go to war in 1914 as well as his execution of the invasion of France and Belgium that culminated in the First Battle of the Marne.

== Early career ==
Helmuth von Moltke was born in Biendorf, Grand Duchy of Mecklenburg-Schwerin, and was named after his uncle, Helmuth Karl Bernhard von Moltke, future Generalfeldmarschall (Field Marshal) and hero of the Unification of Germany. During the Franco-Prussian War, Moltke served with the 7th Grenadier Regiment and was cited for bravery. He attended the War Academy between 1875 and 1878 and joined the General Staff in 1880. In 1882 he became personal adjutant to his uncle, who was then Chief of the General Staff. In 1891, on the death of his uncle, Moltke became aide-de-camp to Emperor Wilhelm II, thus becoming part of the Emperor's inner circle. In 1898 he became commander of the 1st Guards Infantry Brigade and in 1902, being promoted to Lieutenant General, received command of the 1st Guards Infantry Division.

== Rise to the Great General Staff ==
In 1904 Moltke was made Quartermaster-General; in effect, Deputy Chief of the General Staff. In 1906, he became chief on the retirement of Alfred von Schlieffen. His appointment was controversial then and remains so today. The other likely candidates for the position were Hans Hartwig von Beseler, Karl von Bülow and Colmar Freiherr von der Goltz. Critics charge that Moltke gained the position on the strength of his name and his friendship with the Emperor (who liked to call him Julius), with whom he was certainly far closer than were the other candidates. Historians argue that Beseler was too close to Schlieffen to have succeeded him, while Bülow and Goltz were too independent for William II to have accepted them. Moltke's friendship with the Emperor permitted him a latitude that others could not have enjoyed. Goltz, at least, disliked Moltke's performance as Chief.

== Chief of the Great General Staff ==
=== Preparing for war ===
After becoming Chief of the German General Staff, Moltke devoted much of his time reviewing and fine-tuning the war plans set in place by his predecessor, Count Schlieffen. What came to be known as the "Schlieffen Plan" was based on the likelihood that Germany would be forced to fight both France and Russia in a two-front war. As the succeeding Chief of the Great General Staff, Moltke adhered to Schlieffen's plans yet made some modifications such as excluding Holland from the plan.

Therefore, in the event of conflict with Russia, it simultaneously called for a decisive offensive against France. In order to outflank French defenses, the offensive would entail an invasion of the Low Countries, thereby theoretically enabling German forces to swing behind Paris and decisively defeat the whole of France's armies in a battle of encirclement

In December 1911, Moltke lectured the General Staff: "All are preparing themselves for the great war, which all sooner or later expect."

In 1913, Moltke discarded the Germany's sole alternative to the Schlieffen Plan, the Eastern Deployment Plan, which confined hostilities to Russia alone in the event of a Russo-German conflict. Thus, under such circumstances, there was no way for Germany to go to war with Russia without simultaneously opening hostilities against France.

=== Outbreak of World War I ===
Shortly before the outbreak of the First World War and the First Battle of the Marne in September 1914, Moltke was called to the Kaiser who had been told by Karl Max, Prince Lichnowsky, that the British Foreign Secretary, Sir Edward Grey, had offered French neutrality under guarantee of Great Britain. According to the historian John Keegan, however, the Kaiser believed that Britain would remain neutral if Germany did not attack France. Whichever is true, the Kaiser, seeing that a two-front war could be avoided, told Moltke to divert forces from the western to the eastern front against Russia. Moltke refused, arguing that such a drastic alteration of a long-planned major mobilization could not be done without throwing the forces into organizational chaos, and the original plan now in motion had to be followed through. Years later, General Hermann von Staabs, head of the German railway division, disagreed, in a book detailing a contingency plan that the German army had for such a situation. Grey's offer turned out to be a wishful misinterpretation by Lichnowsky and the Kaiser told Moltke to proceed as originally planned.

Over the course of his term during the war, Moltke was confident about the victory of his forces. On 16 August 1914, in the train heading towards Koblenz, Moltke expressed his opinions regarding the Battle of Liège and the Austro-Hungarian Army. He said, "Today the last forts of Liège will be shot to pieces," expressing his confidence in the German victory of the Battle. Further, he assessed the Austro-Hungarian Army to be strong enough to fend off the Russians. Even Josef von Stürgkh, the military attache onboard with Moltke, regarded this as a wishful thought.

Moltke's health, already stressed from this argument with his ruler, would break down as a consequence of Germany's subsequent defeat at the first battle of the Marne, and on 14 September 1914 he was succeeded by Erich von Falkenhayn.

=== Marne Campaign ===
It is a matter of debate whether the "failure" of the Marne Campaign can be placed at Moltke's feet. The German actions had been based on the Schlieffen Plan and von Schlieffen himself had spotted a flaw in his plan, but had not suggested a solution: if the German right wing had made for the west side of Paris they would have been out of touch with the rest of the German army weak and unsupplied, and if they had made for the east of the city they would have been attacked by the French. On 27 August 1914 Moltke instructed General von Kluck (in command of the right wing) to go west of Paris. The next day Kluck decided to move south eastward instead, Moltke acquiesced and not only were Kluck's forces attacked on the flank by the French but also by the British at their rear. Everywhere the Germans rolled back. Some critics contend that Moltke's weakening of the Schlieffen Plan by sending troops to the Eastern Front led to German defeat on the Marne. The records show that Moltke, who was concerned about Russia, moved 180,000 men east before the war. Many thousands more men were transported from the crucial right wing to the left wing facing France in Alsace and Lorraine. Most controversially, on 28 August, Moltke sent two corps and a cavalry division to reinforce Ludendorff and Hindenburg, just before the victory at the Battle of Tannenberg. The series of moves has been viewed by some historians as responsible for much of the strategic failure of the Schlieffen Plan as enacted in 1914. A number of historians, notably Zuber and S. L. A. Marshall, contend that the failure of Alexander von Kluck's 1st Army to keep position with Karl von Bülow's 2nd Army, thus creating a gap near Paris that was exploited by the French, is a more direct cause than any planning foibles on Moltke's part. The Schlieffen School disagrees and argues that Moltke lost control of the invading armies during the month of August and thus was unable to react when the First Battle of the Marne developed in September. While Moltke had lost touch with his field commanders, German operational doctrine had always stressed Auftragstaktik (personal initiative) on the part of subordinate officers, more so than in other armies. Other historians argue that the multitude of strategic options Moltke faced and the danger of the Russian invasion of East Prussia clouded Moltke's judgement.

Although earlier in the campaign, German generals and the press had been proclaiming the campaign as good as won, on 4 September, Moltke was found despondent that the lack of prisoners and captured guns meant that the Germans had not yet really won a decisive victory. Moltke may well have been overly preoccupied with the unsuccessful German offensive in Lorraine, and he issued no orders to the First, Second and Third Armies between 2 and 5 September whilst the Battle of the Marne was in progress.

Following the German retreat from the Marne, Moltke allegedly reported to the Kaiser, "Your Majesty, we have lost the war."

Whether General von Moltke actually said to the Emperor, "Majesty, we have lost the war," we do not know. We know anyhow that with a prescience greater in political than in military affairs, he wrote to his wife on the night of the 9th, "Things have not gone well. The fighting east of Paris has not gone in our favour, and we shall have to pay for the damage we have done".

— Churchill

== Later life ==
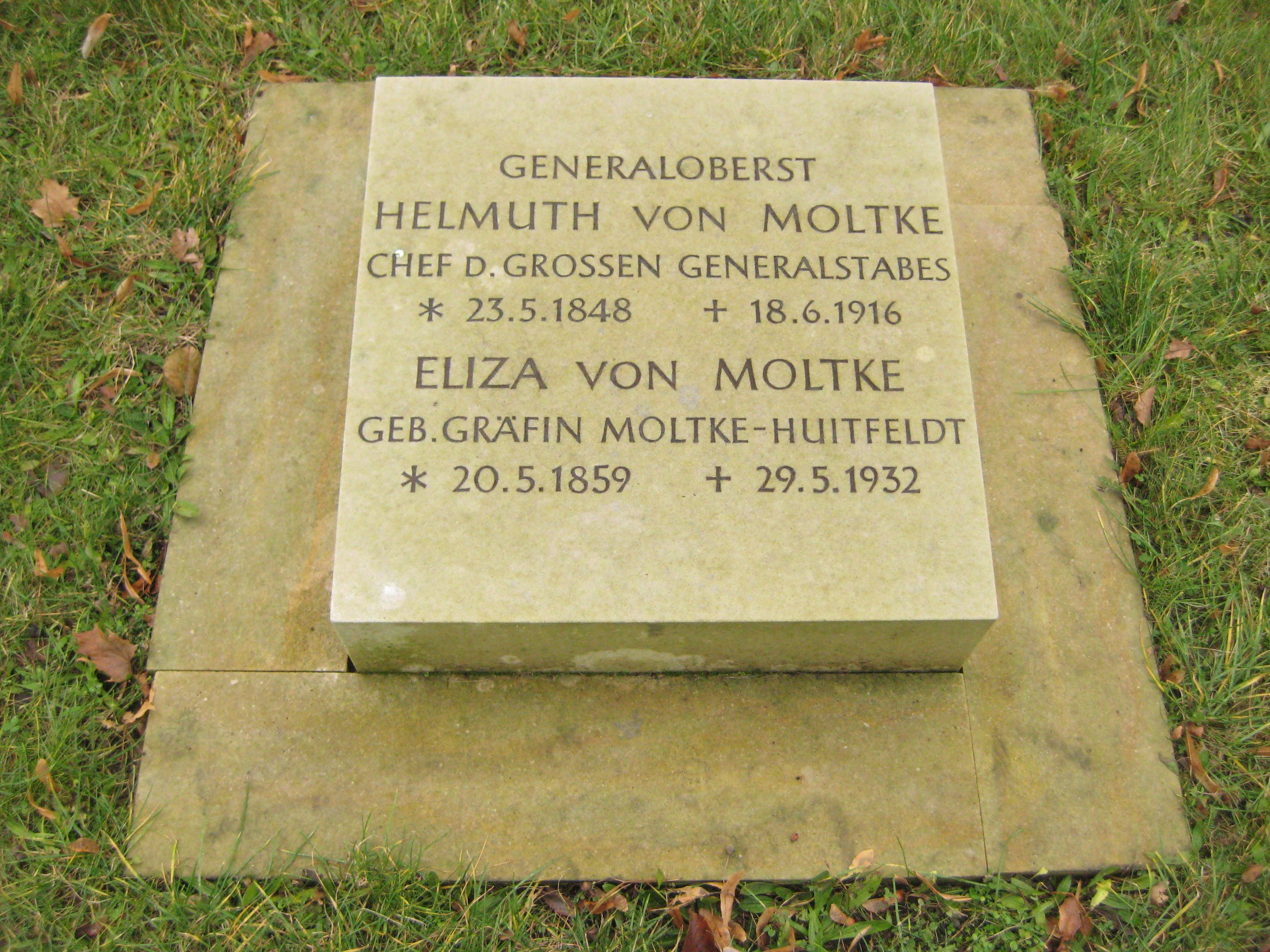
Grave of Helmuth von Moltke in the Invalids' Cemetery (Invalidenfriedhof), Berlin (restitution stone from 2007)

After Moltke handed over authority to Falkenhayn in September 1914, he was entrusted in Berlin with the office of Chief of the Home Substitute for the General Staff, which had the task of organising and forwarding the reserves together with controlling the territorial army corps while corresponding to those at the front. Moltke's health continued to deteriorate, and he died in Berlin on 18 June 1916 (aged 68) during the state memorial ceremony for Generalfeldmarschall Colmar Freiherr von der Goltz. He left a pamphlet entitled Die 'Schuld' am Kriege (The Blame for the War), which his widow Eliza intended to publish in 1919. She was dissuaded from doing so because of the problems it might cause. The pamphlet was designed to show the "chaotic" nature of events leading up to the war, to counter Allied accusations of warmongering by Germany. Army chiefs and the German Foreign Ministry were disturbed by its contents. General Wilhelm von Dommes was sent to advise Gräfin Eliza von Moltke against its publication. Having read the pamphlet, he confided to his diary that it "contains nasty stuff". Instead, Eliza published the more bland Erinnerungen, Briefe, Dokumente, a collection of her husband's letters and documents. Other material was archived. Some was later destroyed during the Second World War and the original pamphlet has been lost since that time.

== Personal life ==
At sixty-six, Graf von Moltke was one of the older commanders of 1914 and in poor health, having suffered a stroke shortly before the outbreak of the war. These factors negatively affected his determination when he was under stress. His personal interests included music, painting and literature. While often assertive in manner, his character was assessed by the historian Barbara W. Tuchman as being essentially that of a self-doubting introvert.

Moltke was a follower of theosophy, which taught that humanity was an endless, unchanging cycle of civilizations rising and falling. Historian Margaret MacMillan connected his personal beliefs with his resigned approach to the possibility of a general war in the lead-up to the First World War. Like many of his colleagues on the German General Staff, he was heavily influenced by Social Darwinism. His view of international relations as merely a struggle for survival led him to believe that the longer the start of the war was delayed the worse things would be for Germany.

== Honours ==
He received the following decorations and awards:

German honours

- Prussia:
  - Iron Cross (1870), 2nd Class
  - Grand Cross of the Red Eagle, with Oak Leaves and Crown
  - Knight of the Royal Crown Order, 2nd Class, 12 September 1896; with Star, 19 September 1901; 1st Class
  - Commander's Star of the Royal House Order of Hohenzollern
  - Knight of the Black Eagle, with Collar, 21.09.1909
  - Service Award Cross
  - Pour le Merite (military), 7 August 1915
- Baden:
  - Grand Cross of the Zähringer Lion, 1905
  - Grand Cross of the Order of Berthold the First, 1909
- Kingdom of Bavaria:
  - Grand Cross of Merit of the Bavarian Crown
  - Grand Cross of the Military Merit Order
- Ernestine duchies: Commander of the Saxe-Ernestine House Order, 2nd Class
- Hesse and by Rhine: Commander of the Merit Order of Philip the Magnanimous, 2nd Class with Swords, 6 May 1892
- Mecklenburg:
  - Grand Commander of the Griffon, 15 November 1904
  - Grand Cross of the Wendish Crown, with Golden Crown, 10 September 1911
- Oldenburg: Grand Cross of the Order of Duke Peter Friedrich Ludwig
- Saxe-Weimar-Eisenach: Commander of the White Falcon, 1892
- Kingdom of Saxony:
  - Commander of the Albert Order, 2nd Class, 1896; Grand Cross with Golden Star
  - Knight of the Rue Crown
- Schaumburg-Lippe: Cross of Honour of the House Order of Schaumburg-Lippe, 1st Class
- Württemberg:
  - Knight of Honour of the Württemberg Crown, with Crown, 1892; Grand Cross
  - Commander of the Friedrich Order, 2nd Class, 1893

Foreign honours

- Austria-Hungary:
  - Knight of the Iron Crown, 2nd Class, 1892
  - Grand Cross of the Order of Franz Joseph, 1900
  - Grand Cross of the Imperial Order of Leopold, 1906; in Brilliants, 1909
  - Commander of the Military Order of Maria Theresa, 1914
- Belgium: Grand Cordon of the Order of Leopold
- Principality of Bulgaria: Grand Cross of St. Alexander
- China: Order of the Double Dragon, Class I Grade III
- Denmark: Grand Cross of the Dannebrog, 29 October 1902; in Brilliants, 10 November 1906
- Kingdom of Italy:
  - Grand Cross of Saints Maurice and Lazarus
  - Grand Cross of the Crown of Italy
- Empire of Japan:
  - Grand Cordon of the Rising Sun
  - Grand Cordon of the Order of Meiji
- Monaco: Grand Cross of St. Charles, 14 April 1907
- Netherlands: Grand Cross of the Order of Orange-Nassau
- Ottoman Empire: Order of Osmanieh, 1st Class
- Persia: Order of the Lion and the Sun, 1st Class
- Kingdom of Portugal: Commander of the Royal Military Order of St. Benedict of Aviz
- Kingdom of Romania:
  - Grand Cross of the Star of Romania
  - Grand Cross of the Crown of Romania
- Russian Empire:
  - Knight of St. Alexander Nevsky
  - Knight of St. Anna, 1st Class in Diamonds
  - Knight of St. Stanislaus, 1st Class
- Kingdom of Serbia: Commander of the Cross of Takovo
- Spain: Grand Cross of the Military Merit Order
- Sweden: Commander Grand Cross of the Sword, 1908
- United Kingdom of Great Britain and Ireland: Honorary Knight Commander of the Royal Victorian Order, 28 May 1901

Military offices
Preceded by Count Schlieffen	Chief of the General Staff; 1906–1914	Succeeded by Erich von Falkenhayn
Preceded by Karl von Bülow	Quartermaster-General of the German Army; 16 February 1904 – 31 December 1905	Succeeded by Fritz von Below
