= Hornstorf =

- Municipality
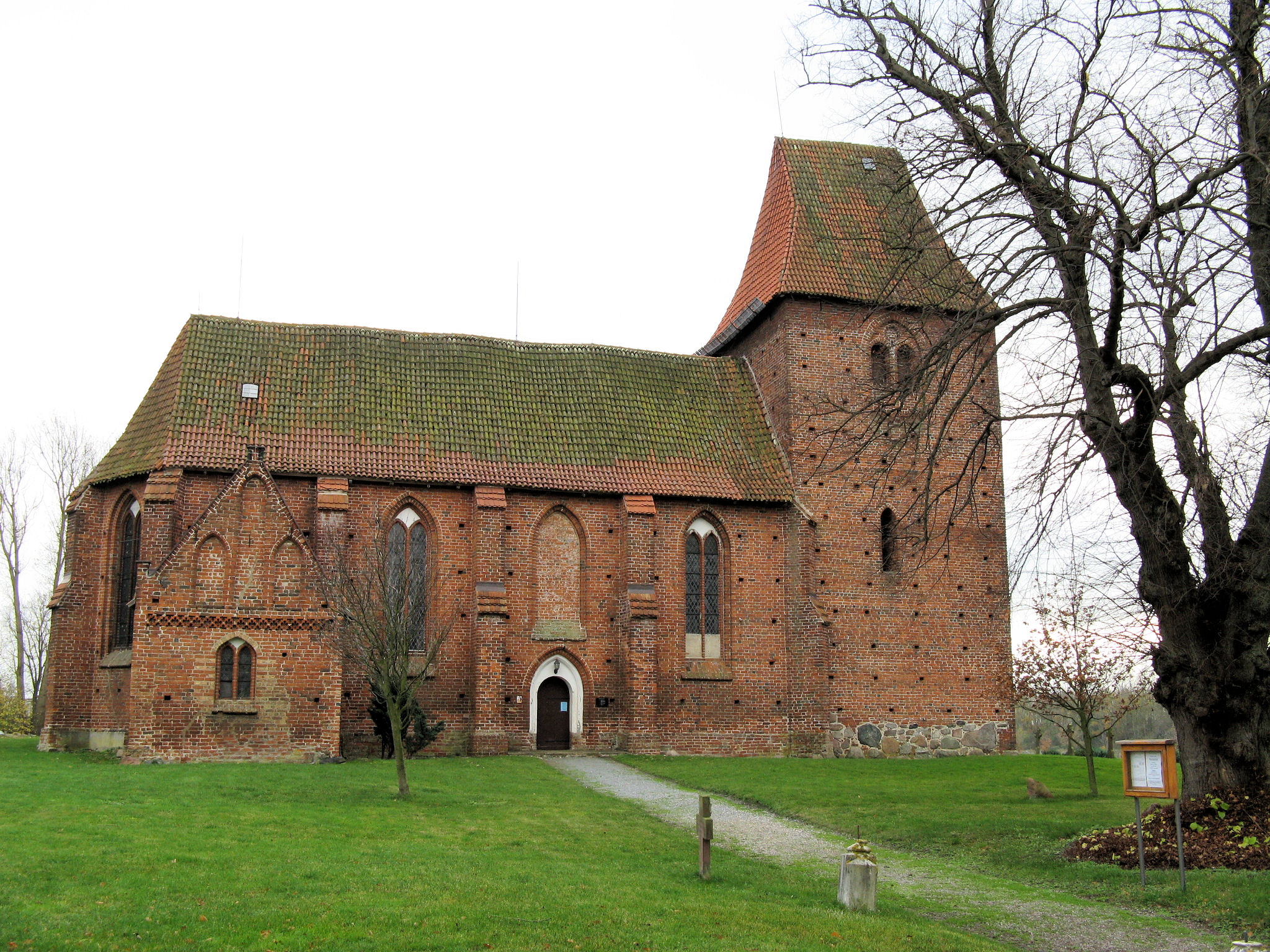
- Medieval village church in Hornstorf

- Location of Hornstorf within Nordwestmecklenburg district
- Interactive map of Hornstorf
- Location within Germany Location within Mecklenburg-Vorpommern
- Coordinates: 53°55′N 11°31′E
- Country: Germany
- State: Mecklenburg-Vorpommern
- District: Nordwestmecklenburg
- Municipal assoc.: Neuburg

Government
  - Mayor: Thomas Grille

Area
  - Total: 14.88 km^{2} (5.75 sq mi)
- Elevation: 47 m (154 ft)

Population (2025-12-31)
  - Total: 1,324
  - Density: 88.98/km^{2} (230.5/sq mi)
- Time zone: UTC+01:00 (CET)
  - Summer (DST): UTC+02:00 (CEST)
- Postal codes: 23974
- Dialling codes: 03841
- Vehicle registration: NWM
- Website: www.amt-neuburg.de

Hornstorf is a municipality in the Nordwestmecklenburg district, in Mecklenburg-Vorpommern, Germany.
