= Biendorf, Mecklenburg-Vorpommern =

Biendorf
- Municipality
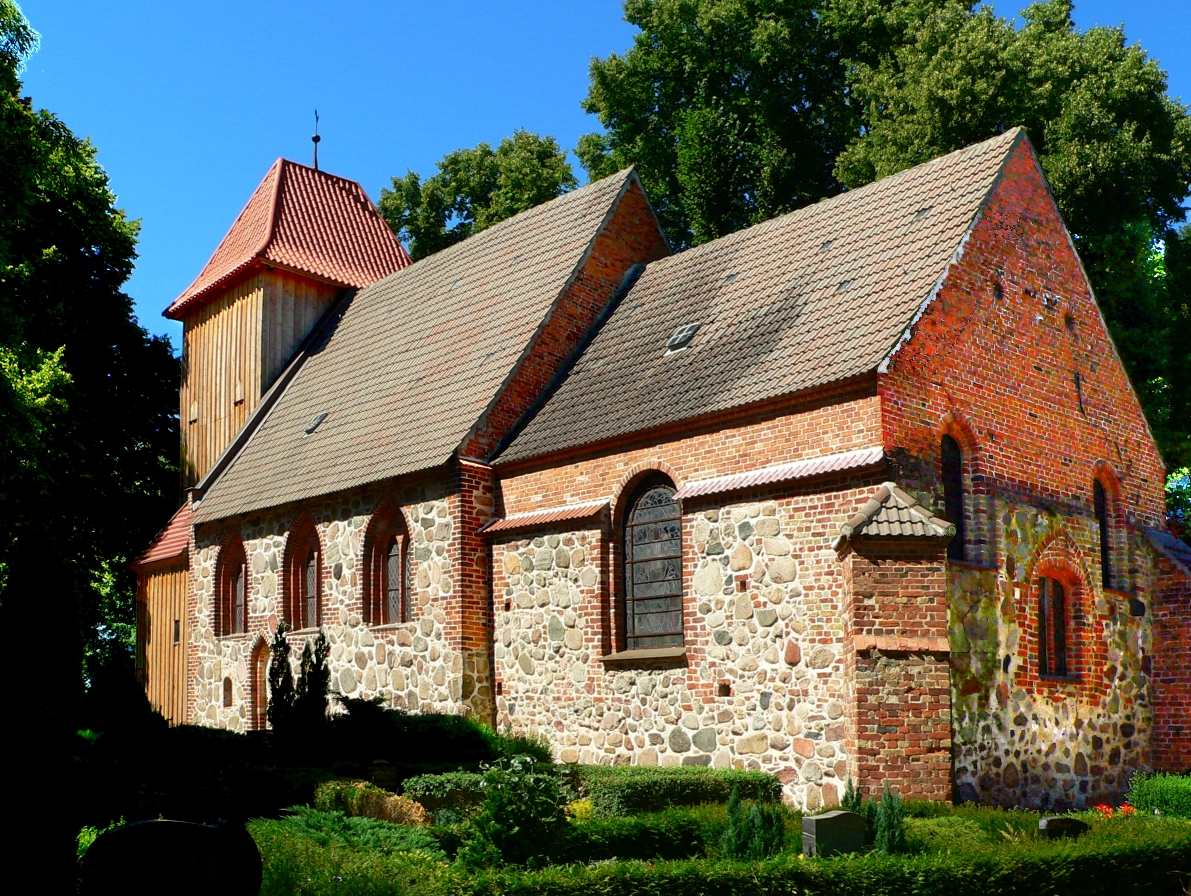
- Medieval village church in Biendorf

- Location of Biendorf within Rostock district
- Interactive map of Biendorf
- Location within Germany Location within Mecklenburg-Vorpommern
- Coordinates: 54°5′N 11°42′E
- Country: Germany
- State: Mecklenburg-Vorpommern
- District: Rostock
- Municipal assoc.: Neubukow-Salzhaff

Government
  - Mayor: Peter-Dieter Schultz

Area
  - Total: 40.99 km^{2} (15.83 sq mi)
- Elevation: 48 m (157 ft)

Population (2025-12-31)
  - Total: 1,320
  - Density: 32.2/km^{2} (83.4/sq mi)
- Time zone: UTC+01:00 (CET)
  - Summer (DST): UTC+02:00 (CEST)
- Postal codes: 18233
- Dialling codes: 038292, 038294
- Vehicle registration: LRO
- Website: neubukow-salzhaff.de

Biendorf (German pronunciation: [ˈbiːndɔʁf]) is a municipality in the Rostock district, in Mecklenburg-Vorpommern, Germany.

== People ==
- Adolph Friedrich Johann Riedel (1809–1872), German antiquarian, industrialist and politician
- Helmuth von Moltke the Younger (1848–1916), German field marshal
