= Martina Bunge =

German politician (1951–2022)

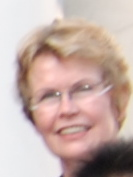

Martina Bunge (18 May 1951 in Leipzig – 1 May 2022) was a German politician and member of "die Linke" (The Left).
