= Neuburg (Amt) =

- Amt
- Map of Nordwestmecklenburg highlighting Neuburg
- Interactive map of Neuburg
- Location within Germany Location within Mecklenburg-Vorpommern
- Coordinates: 53°57′N 11°31′E
- Country: Germany
- State: Mecklenburg-Vorpommern
- District: Nordwestmecklenburg
- Seat: Neuburg
- Subdivisions: 6 municipalities

Area
  - Total: 136.1 km^{2} (52.5 sq mi)

Population (2025-12-31)
  - Total: 6,283
  - Density: 46.16/km^{2} (119.6/sq mi)
- Time zone: UTC+01:00 (CET)
  - Summer (DST): UTC+02:00 (CEST)
- Website: www.amt-neuburg.de

Neuburg is an Amt in the district of Nordwestmecklenburg, in Mecklenburg-Vorpommern, Germany. The seat of the Amt is in Neuburg.

The Amt Neuburg consists of the following municipalities:

1. Benz
2. Blowatz
3. Boiensdorf
4. Hornstorf
5. Krusenhagen
6. Neuburg
