= Alt Bukow =

- Municipality
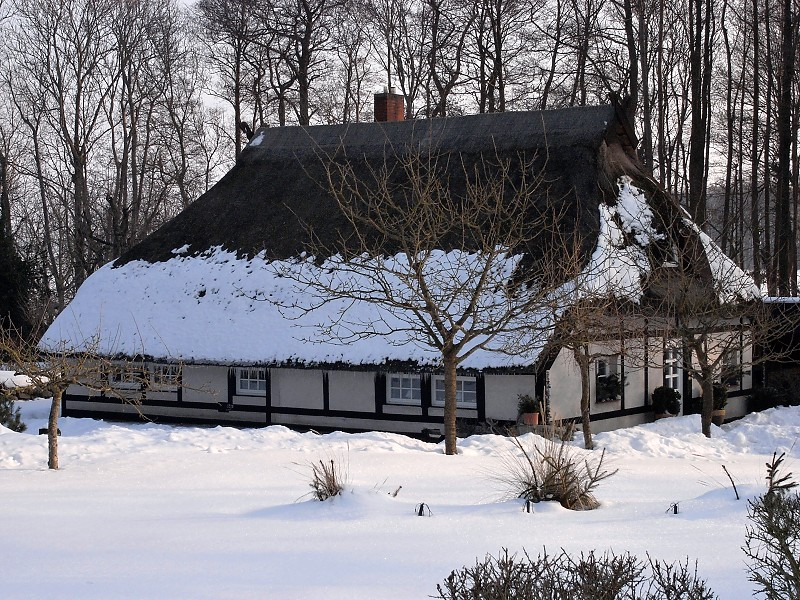
- A thatched house in Alt Bukow

- Coat of arms

- Location of Alt Bukow within Rostock district
- Interactive map of Alt Bukow
- Location within Germany Location within Mecklenburg-Vorpommern
- Coordinates: 54°00′N 11°36′E
- Country: Germany
- State: Mecklenburg-Vorpommern
- District: Rostock
- Municipal assoc.: Neubukow-Salzhaff

Government
  - Mayor: Peter Woest

Area
  - Total: 15.28 km^{2} (5.90 sq mi)
- Elevation: 38 m (125 ft)

Population (2025-12-31)
  - Total: 519
  - Density: 34.0/km^{2} (88.0/sq mi)
- Time zone: UTC+01:00 (CET)
  - Summer (DST): UTC+02:00 (CEST)
- Postal codes: 18233
- Dialling codes: 038294
- Vehicle registration: LRO
- Website: neubukow-salzhaff.de

Alt Bukow (German pronunciation: [altˈbukoː], lit. 'Old Bukow', in contrast to "New Bukow") is a municipality in the Rostock district, in Mecklenburg-Vorpommern, Germany.
