= Neuburg, Mecklenburg-Vorpommern =

Neuburg
- Municipality
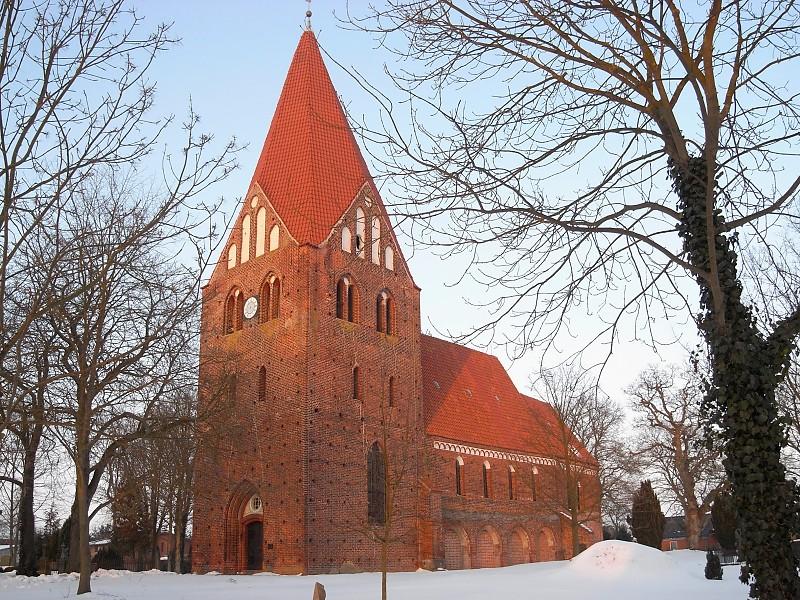
- Church in Neuburg

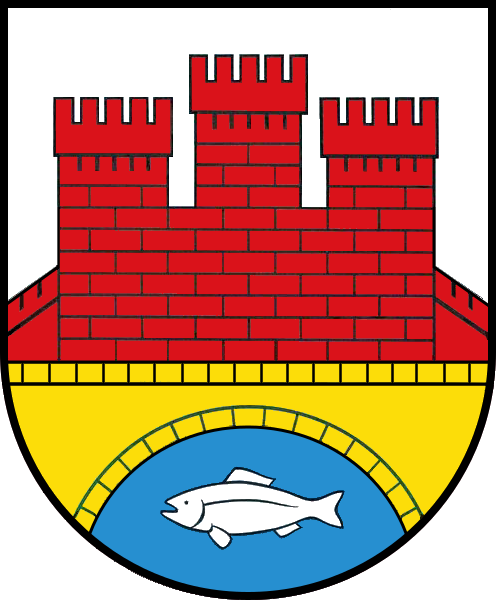
- Coat of arms

- Location of Neuburg within Nordwestmecklenburg district
- Interactive map of Neuburg
- Location within Germany Location within Mecklenburg-Vorpommern
- Coordinates: 53°57′N 11°35′E
- Country: Germany
- State: Mecklenburg-Vorpommern
- District: Nordwestmecklenburg
- Municipal assoc.: Neuburg

Government
  - Mayor: Heidrun Teichmann (Left)

Area
  - Total: 44.09 km^{2} (17.02 sq mi)
- Elevation: 41 m (135 ft)

Population (2025-12-31)
  - Total: 2,129
  - Density: 48.29/km^{2} (125.1/sq mi)
- Time zone: UTC+01:00 (CET)
  - Summer (DST): UTC+02:00 (CEST)
- Postal codes: 23974
- Dialling codes: 038426
- Vehicle registration: NWM
- Website: www.amt-neuburg.de

Neuburg (German pronunciation: [ˈnɔʏbʊʁk]) is a municipality in the Nordwestmecklenburg district, in Mecklenburg-Vorpommern, Germany.
