= Bastorf =

- Municipality
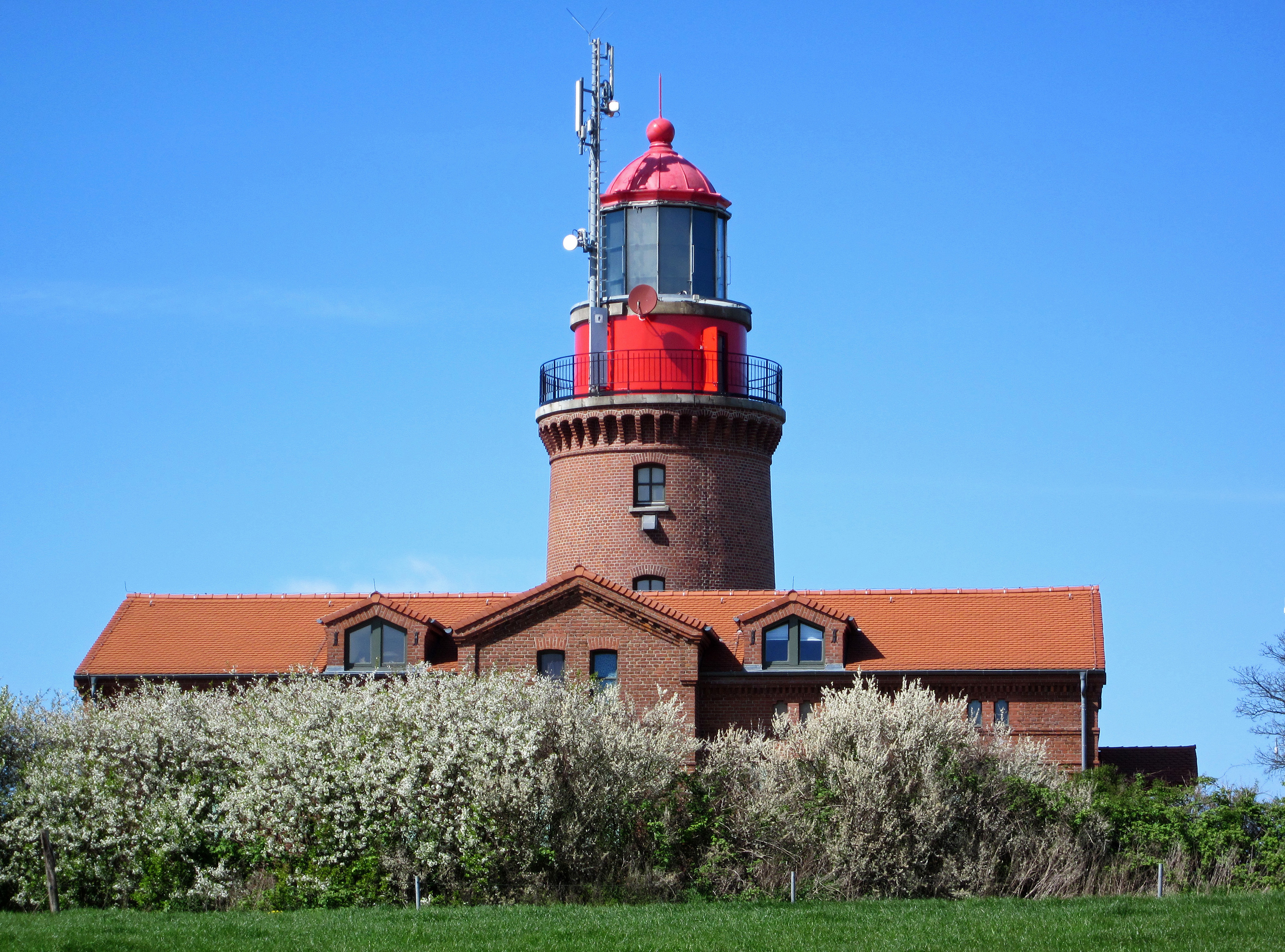
- Bastorf Lighthouse

- Location of Bastorf within Rostock district
- Interactive map of Bastorf
- Location within Germany Location within Mecklenburg-Vorpommern
- Coordinates: 54°7′N 11°41′E
- Country: Germany
- State: Mecklenburg-Vorpommern
- District: Rostock
- Municipal assoc.: Neubukow-Salzhaff

Government
  - Mayor: Detlef Kurreck

Area
  - Total: 24.40 km^{2} (9.42 sq mi)
- Elevation: 51 m (167 ft)

Population (2025-12-31)
  - Total: 1,150
  - Density: 47.1/km^{2} (122/sq mi)
- Time zone: UTC+01:00 (CET)
  - Summer (DST): UTC+02:00 (CEST)
- Postal codes: 18230
- Dialling codes: 038293, 038294, 038296
- Vehicle registration: LRO
- Website: www.neubukow-salzhaff.de www.ostseegemeinde-bastorf.de

Bastorf is a municipality in the Rostock district, in Mecklenburg-Vorpommern, Germany.
