= Grevesmühlen-Land =

Amt in Mecklenburg-Vorpommern, Germany

- Amt
- Map of Nordwestmecklenburg highlighting Grevesmühlen-Land
- Interactive map of Grevesmühlen-Land
- Location within Germany Location within Mecklenburg-Vorpommern
- Coordinates: 53°52′N 11°10′E
- Country: Germany
- State: Mecklenburg-Vorpommern
- District: Nordwestmecklenburg
- Seat: Grevesmühlen
- Subdivisions: 8 municipalities

Area
  - Total: 208.85 km^{2} (80.64 sq mi)

Population (2025-12-31)
  - Total: 8,405
  - Density: 40.24/km^{2} (104.2/sq mi)
- Time zone: UTC+01:00 (CET)
  - Summer (DST): UTC+02:00 (CEST)
- Website: www.grevesmuehlen.eu

Grevesmühlen-Land is an Amt in the district of Nordwestmecklenburg, in Mecklenburg-Vorpommern, Germany. The seat of the Amt is in Grevesmühlen, itself not part of the Amt.

The Amt Grevesmühlen-Land consists of the following municipalities:

1. Bernstorf
2. Gägelow
3. Roggenstorf
4. Rüting
5. Stepenitztal
6. Testorf-Steinfort
7. Upahl
8. Warnow
