= Warnow, Nordwestmecklenburg =

Warnow
- Municipality
- Location of Warnow within Nordwestmecklenburg district
- Interactive map of Warnow
- Location within Germany Location within Mecklenburg-Vorpommern
- Coordinates: 53°52′N 11°11′E
- Country: Germany
- State: Mecklenburg-Vorpommern
- District: Nordwestmecklenburg
- Municipal assoc.: Grevesmühlen-Land

Government
  - Mayor: Lothar Kacprzyk

Area
  - Total: 16.07 km^{2} (6.20 sq mi)
- Elevation: 39 m (128 ft)

Population (2025-12-31)
  - Total: 613
  - Density: 38.1/km^{2} (98.8/sq mi)
- Time zone: UTC+01:00 (CET)
  - Summer (DST): UTC+02:00 (CEST)
- Postal codes: 23936
- Dialling codes: 03881
- Vehicle registration: NWM
- Website: www.grevesmuehlen.de

Warnow (German pronunciation: [ˈvaʁno]) is a municipality in the Nordwestmecklenburg district, in Mecklenburg-Vorpommern, Germany.
