= Bernstorf =

- Municipality
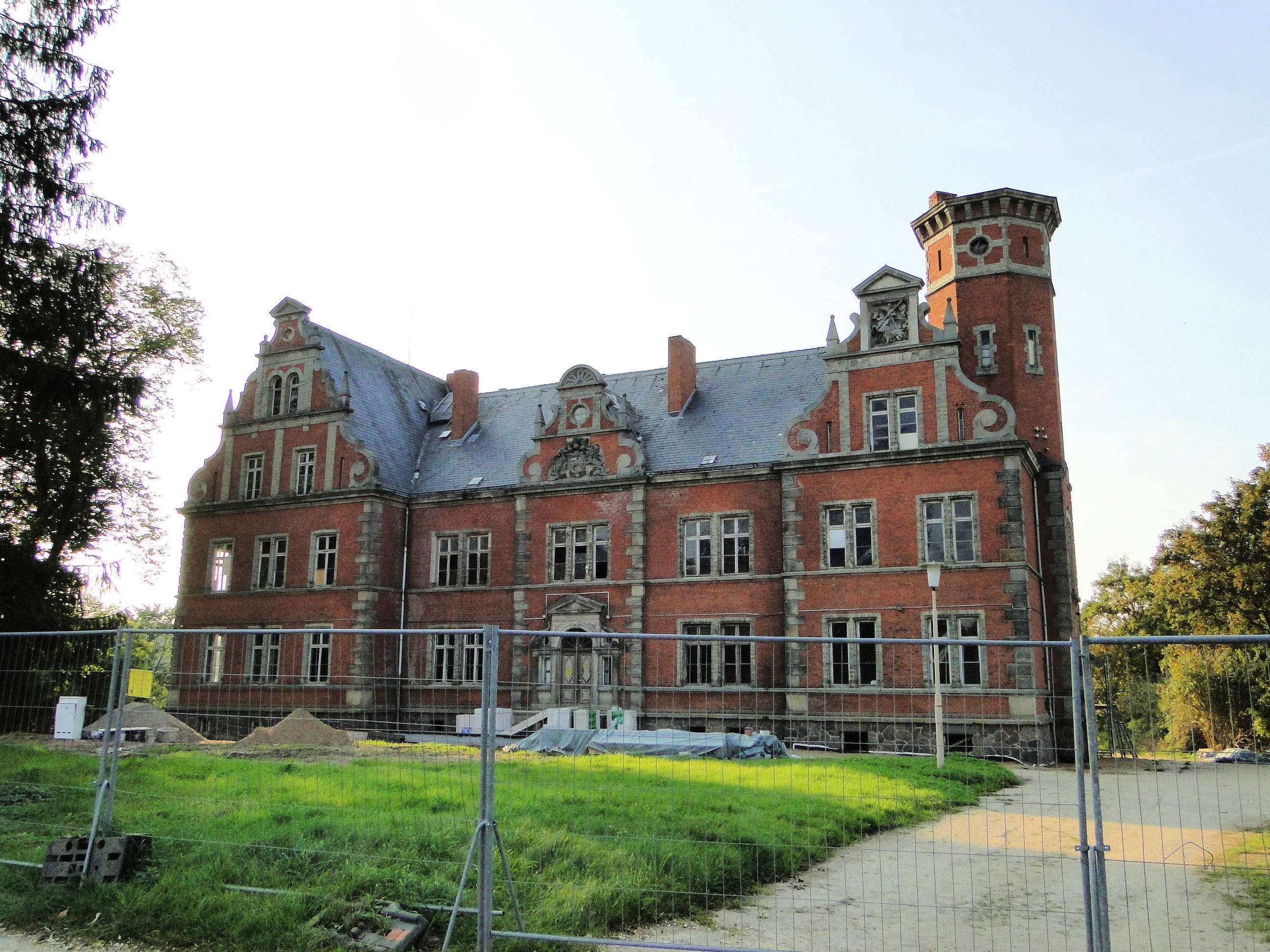
- Herrenhaus Bernstorf in Bernstorf

- Location of Bernstorf within Nordwestmecklenburg district
- Interactive map of Bernstorf
- Location within Germany Location within Mecklenburg-Vorpommern
- Coordinates: 53°49′N 11°07′E
- Country: Germany
- State: Mecklenburg-Vorpommern
- District: Nordwestmecklenburg
- Municipal assoc.: Grevesmühlen-Land
- Subdivisions: 7

Government
  - Mayor: Mirko Timm

Area
  - Total: 17.56 km^{2} (6.78 sq mi)
- Elevation: 22 m (72 ft)

Population (2025-12-31)
  - Total: 353
  - Density: 20.1/km^{2} (52.1/sq mi)
- Time zone: UTC+01:00 (CET)
  - Summer (DST): UTC+02:00 (CEST)
- Postal codes: 23936
- Dialling codes: 03881
- Vehicle registration: NWM
- Website: www.grevesmuehlen.de

Bernstorf is a municipality in the Nordwestmecklenburg district, in Mecklenburg-Vorpommern, Germany.
