= Frank Junge =

German politician

- Junge in 2021

Member of the Bundestag; from Mecklenburg-Vorpommern
- In office 22 October 2013 – 19 July 2026
- Preceded by: Multi-member district
- Succeeded by: Katrin Zschau
- Constituency: State list (2013–2021); Ludwigslust-Parchim II – Nordwestmecklenburg II – Landkreis Rostock I (2021–2025); State list (2025–2026)

Personal details
- Born: Frank Michael Junge; 5 May 1967 (age 59) Halle (Saale), East Germany
- Party: Social Democratic
- Children: 2
- Education: Leipzig University

Frank Junge (born 5 May 1967) is a German politician of the Social Democratic Party (SPD) who served as a member of the Bundestag from the state of Mecklenburg-Vorpommern from 2013 to 2026.

== Political career ==
Junge joined the SPD in 1998. He first became a member of the Bundestag in the 2013 German federal election, representing the Ludwigslust-Parchim II – Nordwestmecklenburg II – Landkreis Rostock I district.

In parliament, Junge served on the Finance Committee (2013–2017), the Committee on Tourism (2013–2026), the Committee for Economic Affairs and Energy (2017–2021) and, as alternate member, the Budget Committee (2021–2026). On the Budget Committee, he was his parliamentary group’s rapporteur on the annual budget of the Federal Ministry for Economic Affairs and Climate Action.

In 2019, Junge was appointed by the Federal Ministry of the Interior, Building and Community to serve on the committee that oversaw the preparations for the 30th anniversary of German reunification.
