= Neubukow =

Town in Mecklenburg-Vorpommern, Germany

- Town
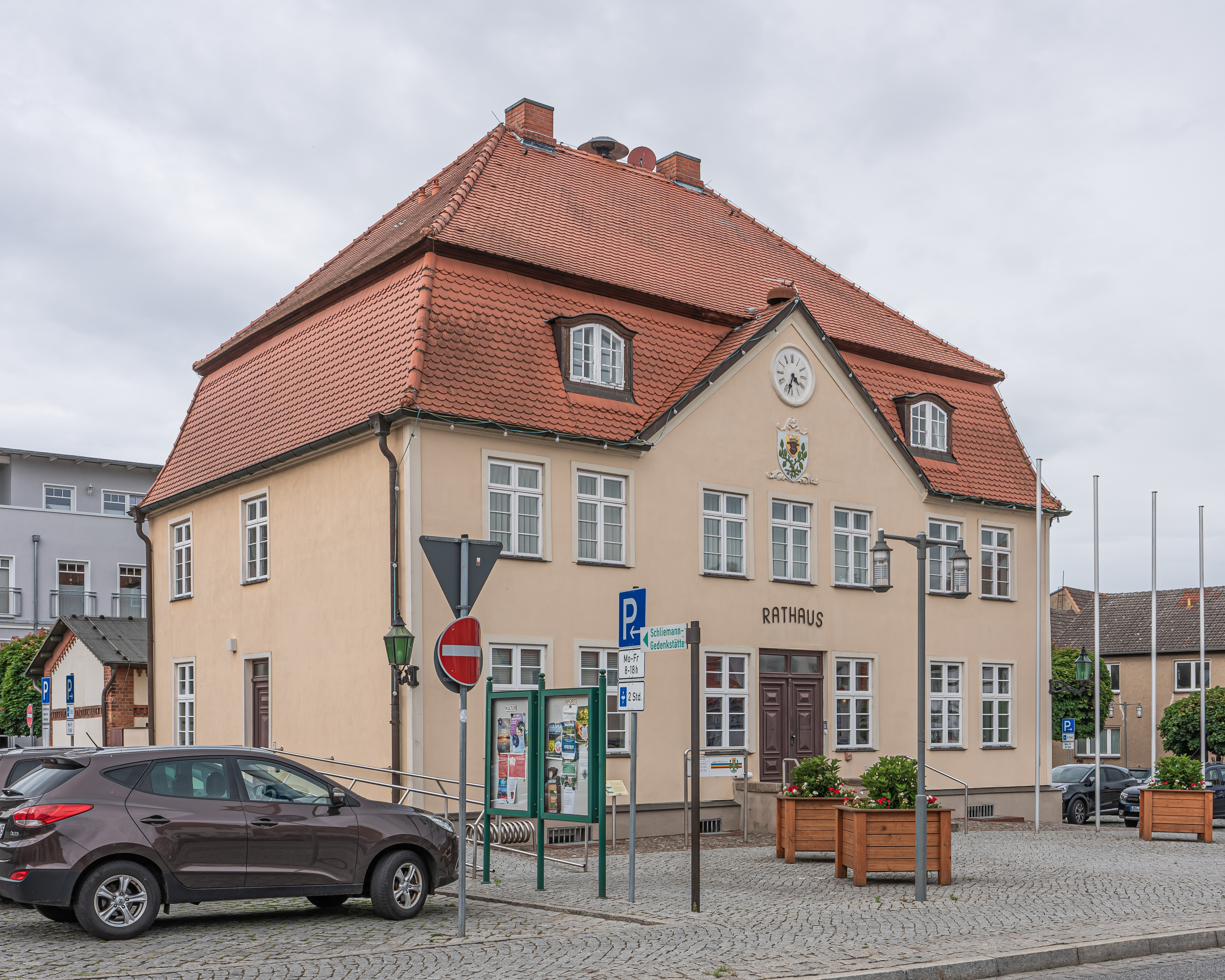
- Town hall

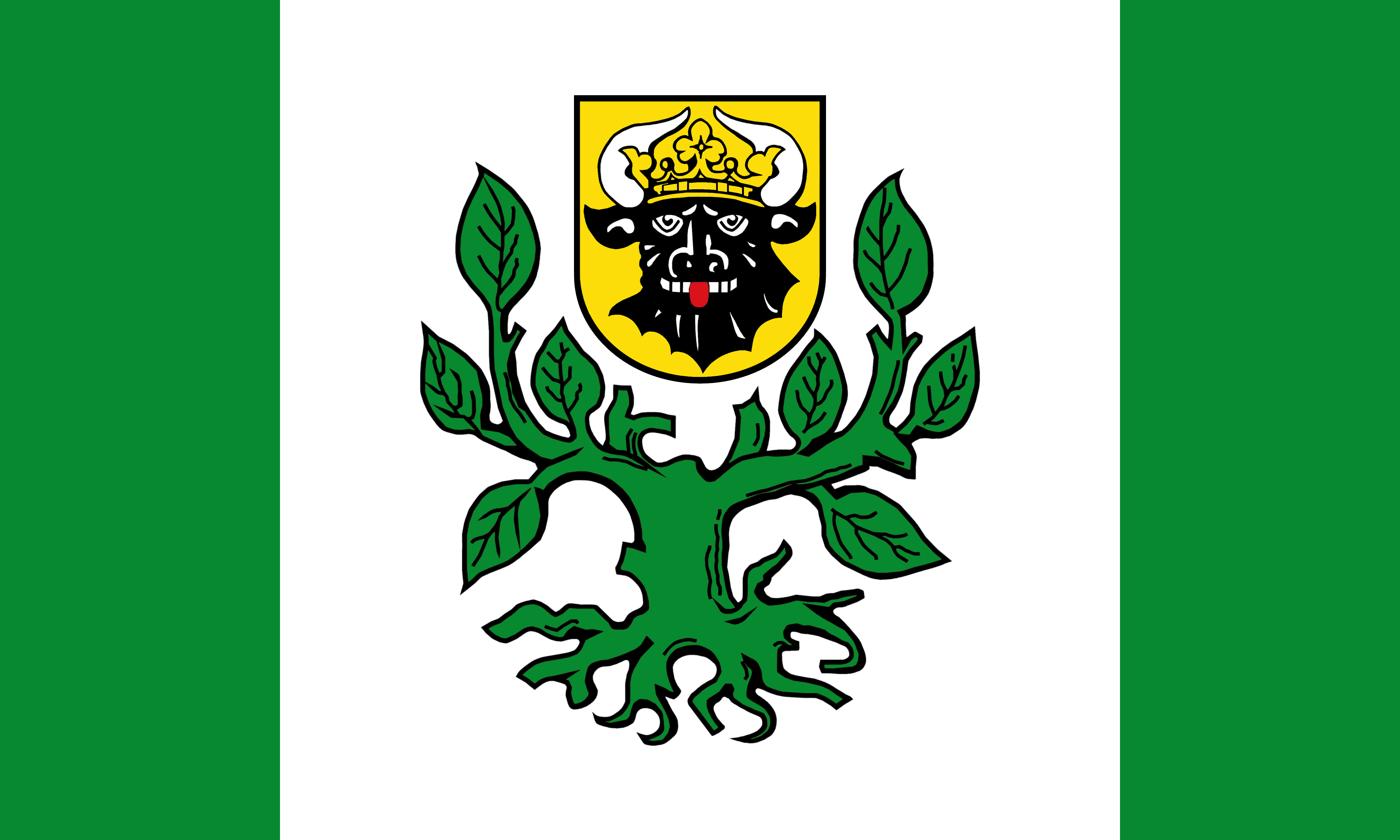
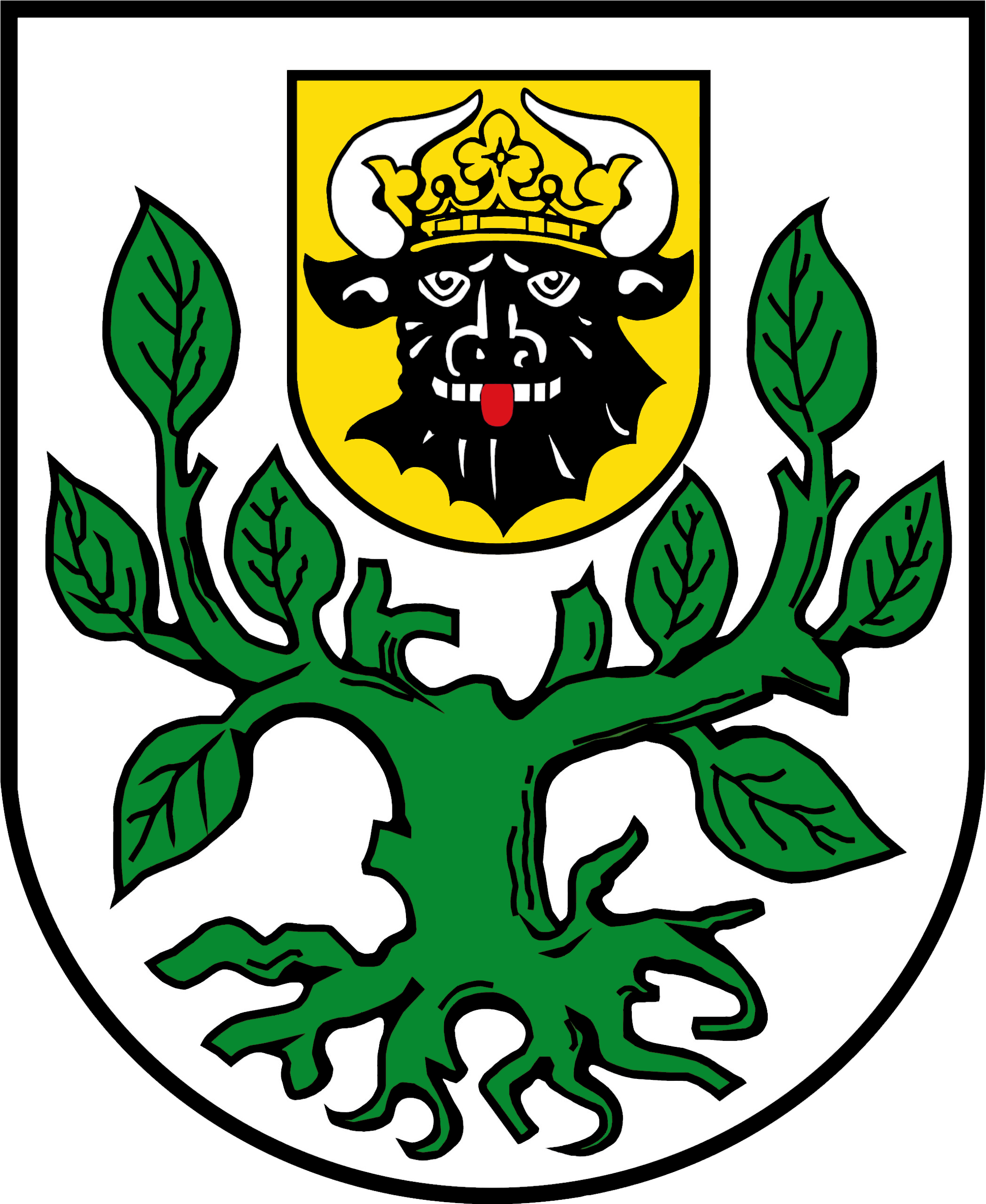
- Flag Coat of arms

- Location of Neubukow in the district Rostock
- Interactive map of Neubukow
- Location within Germany Location within Mecklenburg-Vorpommern
- Coordinates: 54°01′N 11°40′E
- Country: Germany
- State: Mecklenburg-Vorpommern
- District: Rostock

Government
  - Mayor: Roland Dethloff

Area
  - Total: 25.12 km^{2} (9.70 sq mi)
- Elevation: 15 m (49 ft)

Population (2025-12-31)
  - Total: 3,984
  - Density: 158.6/km^{2} (410.8/sq mi)
- Time zone: UTC+01:00 (CET)
  - Summer (DST): UTC+02:00 (CEST)
- Postal codes: 18233
- Dialling codes: 038294
- Vehicle registration: LRO
- Website: www.neubukow.de

Neubukow (German pronunciation: [nɔʏˈbukoː], lit. 'New Bukow', in contrast to "Old Bukow", where 'Bukov' is a Polabian adjective from "beech tree") is a town in the Rostock district, in Mecklenburg-Western Pomerania, Germany. It is situated 18 km southwest of Bad Doberan, and 21 km northeast of Wismar. The archeologist Heinrich Schliemann was born in Neubukow. The "Heinrich Schliemann-Gedenkstätte" is a small museum dedicated to his life and work.

== Partnerships ==
- (Germany) Reinfeld, Schleswig-Holstein
- (Germany) Steinfurt, North Rhine-Westphalia

== Natives ==
- Rudolf Goldschmidt (1876–1950), German engineer and inventor
- Heinrich Schliemann (1822–1890), German archaeologist
