= Berge =

Berge may refer to:

== Places ==
- Berge (Thrace) an Athenian colony in Thrace, north of Amphipolis
- Berge, Teruel, a municipality in Teruel Province, Aragon, Spain
- in Germany:
  - Berge (Brandenburg), a municipality in the district of Prignitz, in Brandenburg
  - Berge (Lower Saxony), a municipality in the district of Osnabrück, in Lower Saxony
  - Berge (Saxony-Anhalt), a locality in the town Gardelegen, Altmarkkreis Salzwedel, in Saxony-Anhalt

== Surname ==
- Berge (surname)

== See also ==
- Burj (disambiguation)
- Burg (disambiguation)
- Berg (disambiguation)
