= Lita zu Putlitz =

German writer

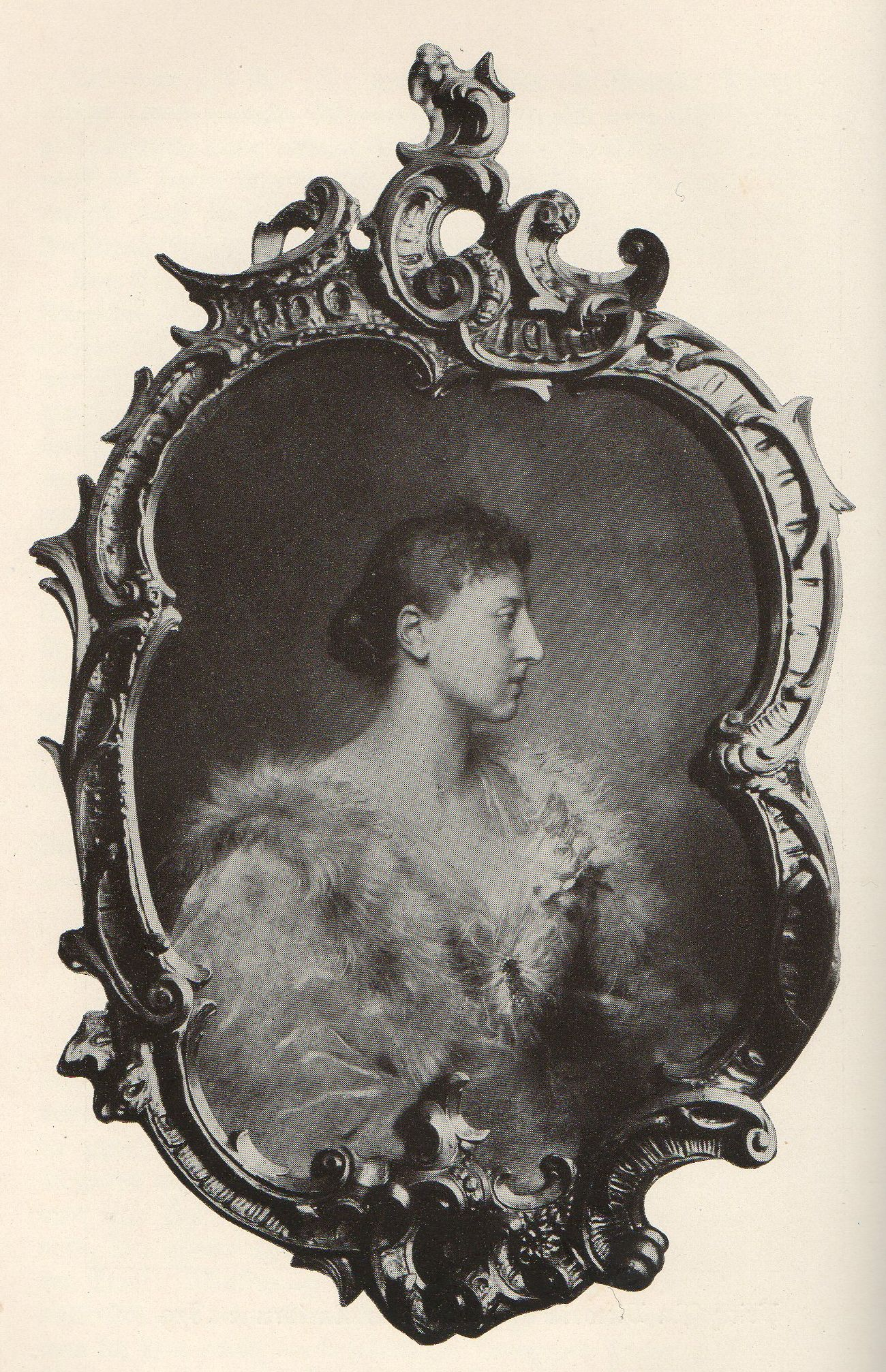
Lita zu Putlitz in Karlsruhe 1889 by Ferdinand Keller

Lita zu Putlitz (real name Elisabeth Karoline Josephine Gans zu Putlitz), (27 October 1862 at Schloss Retzin – 1935) was a German woman writer.

== Life ==
Putlitz was the only daughter of the married couple Gustav and Elisabeth Gans zu Putlitz, née Countess Königsmarck. She had four older brothers, Stephan Gans zu Putlitz, Konrad Gans zu Putlitz, Joachim Gans zu Putlitz and Wolfgang Gans zu Putlitz. A younger brother named Victor died as an infant. The family lived alternately at Schloss Retzin and at the Königsmarcksches Palais in Berlin until his profession took Gustav Gans zu Putlitz to Karlsruhe. After the death of her father, Lita zu Putlitz lived with her mother and a brother at Schloss Retzin.

She wrote an autobiographical essay entitled Aus dem Bildersaal meines Lebens and 1813, a festival play in two acts, as well as literary occasional works. She also published her mother's memoirs.
