= William, Margrave of the Nordmark =

William
- Margrave of the Nordmark
- Tenure: 1051–1056
- Died: 10 September 1056; Pritzlawa
- Father: Bernard, Margrave of the Nordmark

William (died 10 September 1056) was the Margrave of the Nordmark from 1051 until his death. He was the eldest son and successor of the Margrave Bernard by a daughter of Vladimir the Great. He died fighting the Slavs in the Battle of Pritzlawa. Upon his death, he was succeeded by his half-brother Otto as Margrave of the Nordmark.

== Sources ==
- Bury, J. B. (editor), The Cambridge Medieval History: Volume III, Germany and the Western Empire, Cambridge University Press, 1922, page 306
