= Gumtow (disambiguation) =

Gumtow may refer to

== Places ==
- Gumtow, municipality and village in Prignitz district in Brandenburg, Germany
  - Amt Gumtow, former collective municipality which the municipality of Gumtow was part of from 1992 to 2002; its borders were the same as the current municipality
- Chomętowo, Gryfice County, in West Pomeranian Voivodeship (north-west Poland); called Gumtow in German
- Chomętowo, Świdwin County, in West Pomeranian Voivodeship (north-west Poland); called Gumtow in German
