= Battle of Pritzlawa =

The Battle of Pritzlawa (Prinzlowa) in 1056 took place near present Quitzöbel, Germany between the Saxons and the Slavic Liutizen. The battle was a disaster for the Saxons, killing many knights and their leader William, Margrave of the Nordmark.

Pritzlawa first appears as iuxta Wiribeni Albim in the Chronicle of Thietmar of Merseburg. He reported that Emperor Henry II met there several times with Poles, resulting more often than not in war rather than peace.

After their defeat during the Great Slav Rising of 983, the Germans were anxious to recover their old rule. The peace imposed by Emperor Conrad II was twice broken under the rule of Henry III. In 1045, he led an expedition and they quickly submitted, returning to pay tribute. After ten years of negotiation the Liutizen again rose up and the emperor dispatched William of the Nordmark and a Count Dietrich (it is unclear as to who this count was) with a large force to rein them in. In 1056, the Saxons made their move to disastrous results. Led by Margrave William, he and his knights and horsemen drowned in the flooding of the Havel. Both William and Dietrich fell in this battle, where a ruined castle still overlooks the confluence of the Havel and the Elbe. (The number of knights lost has been estimated in the thousands, which is doubtful.) The news of this defeat apparently seriously impacted the seriously ill Emperor Henry III, possibly hastening his death. The result of the battle was inconclusive, with the Poles turning to internal affairs under Casimir I the Restorer.

== Sources ==
- Bury, J. B. (editor), The Cambridge Medieval History: Volume III, Germany and the Western Empire, Cambridge University Press, 1922, page 306
- Warner, David A., Ottonian Germany: The Chronicon of Thietmar of Merseburg, Manchester University Press, Manchester, 2001
- Heuer, Reinhard, Prignitzer Legends and Stories, Pritzwalk 1922
