= Stepenitz =

Stepenitz refers to:

- Stepenitz (Elbe), river in Brandenburg, Germany
- Stepenitz (Trave), river in Mecklenburg-Vorpommern, Germany
- Stepenitz, former village in Brandenburg, now part of Marienfließ
- Groß Stepenitz and Bad Stepenitz, German names of Stepnica, Poland
