= Weisen =

- Municipality
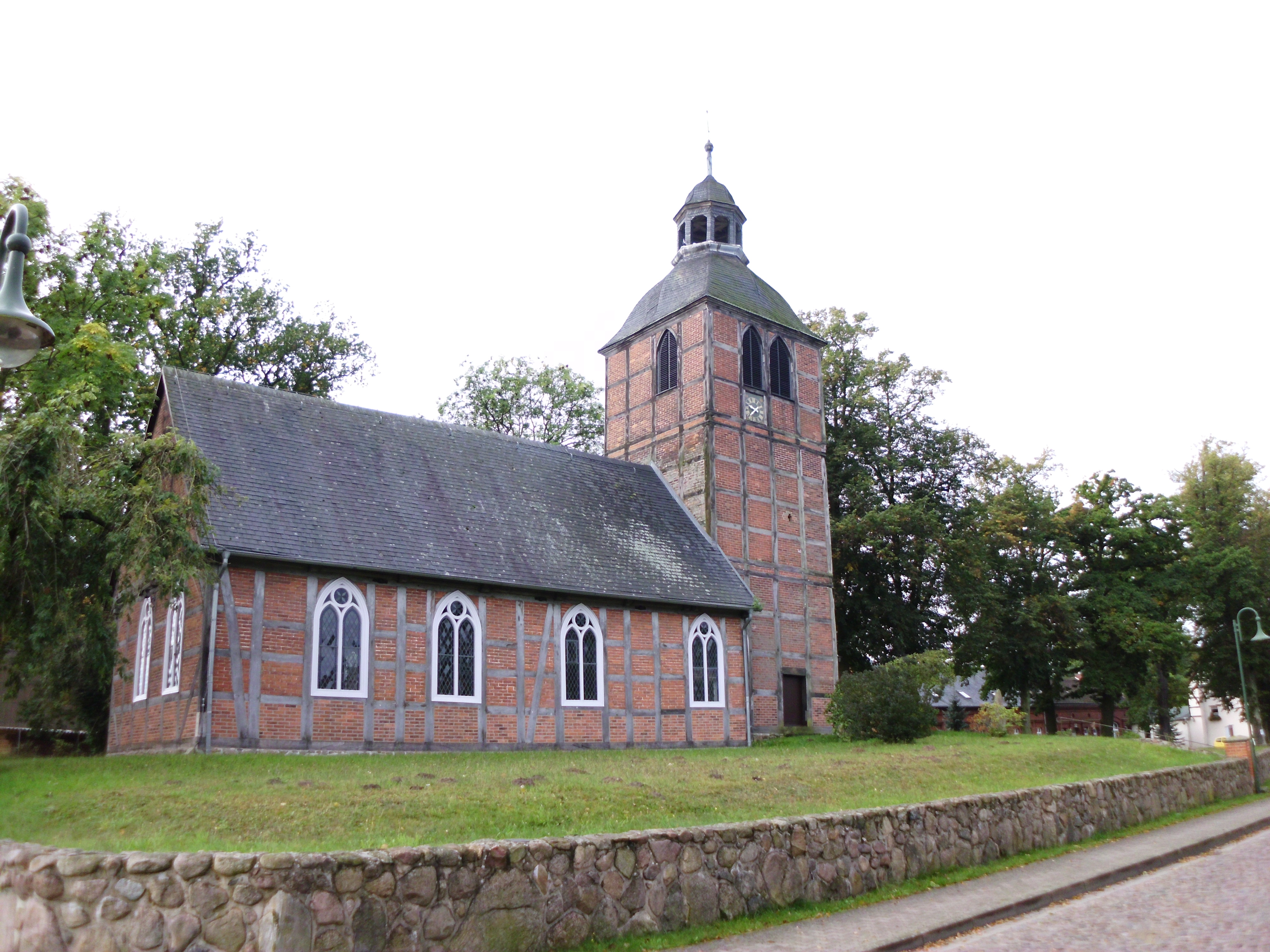
- Church in Weisen

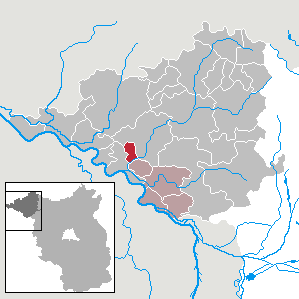
- Location of Weisen within Prignitz district
- Interactive map of Weisen
- Location within Germany Location within Brandenburg
- Coordinates: 53°02′N 11°47′E
- Country: Germany
- State: Brandenburg
- District: Prignitz
- Municipal assoc.: Bad Wilsnack/Weisen

Government
  - Mayor (2024–29): Jens Becker

Area
  - Total: 15.60 km^{2} (6.02 sq mi)
- Elevation: 22 m (72 ft)

Population (2025-12-31)
  - Total: 1,001
  - Density: 64.17/km^{2} (166.2/sq mi)
- Time zone: UTC+01:00 (CET)
  - Summer (DST): UTC+02:00 (CEST)
- Postal codes: 19322
- Dialling codes: 03877
- Vehicle registration: PR

Weisen is a municipality in the Prignitz district, in Brandenburg, in northern Germany. It consists of the main village Weisen, the small settlement Waldhaus and the village Schilde.

== Geography ==
Weisen is located between the towns of Wittenberge in the southwest and Perleberg in the northeast, from which Weisen is separated by a forest. The south border of Weisen is marked by the Stepenitz river with the municipality of Breese on the other side. The west border corresponds roughly to the Berlin–Hamburg Railway. The village of Schilde constitutes the northern part of the municipality of Weisen. North of Schilde is Dergenthin, which belongs to Perleberg.

The German federal highway 189 crosses between the villages Weisen and Schilde. The village of Weisen has a train stop on the Wittenberge–Wittstock–Berlin railway.

Weisen is situated in the Elbe Urstromtal. Parts of the municipality belong to the UNESCO biosphere reserve Elbe river landscape.

== History ==
During the final stages of World War II, on 10 March 1945, Schilde (now part of the municipality) was the site of a stopover during the German-organised march of French prisoners of war from the Oflag II-B camp to the Oflag VI-A camp.

== Demography ==
Development of population since 1875 within the current boundaries (Blue Line: Population; Dotted Line: Comparison to Population Development of Brandenburg state; Grey Background: Time of Nazi rule; Red Background: Time of Communist rule)

Weisen: Population development
within the current boundaries (2013)

Year	Pop.	±% p.a.
1875	653	—
1890	629	−0.25%
1910	705	+0.57%
1925	932	+1.88%
1933	1,084	+1.91%
1939	1,559	+6.24%
1946	1,898	+2.85%
1950	1,853	−0.60%
1964	1,579	−1.14%
1971	1,387	−1.84%
1981	1,182	−1.59%
1985	1,144	−0.81%
1989	1,142	−0.04%
1990	1,131	−0.96%
1991	1,099	−2.83%
1992	1,118	+1.73%
1993	1,127	+0.81%
1994	1,132	+0.44%
1995	1,177	+3.98%
1996	1,160	−1.44%

Year	Pop.	±% p.a.
1997	1,184	+2.07%
1998	1,161	−1.94%
1999	1,159	−0.17%
2000	1,182	+1.98%
2001	1,156	−2.20%
2002	1,163	+0.61%
2003	1,133	−2.58%
2004	1,117	−1.41%
2005	1,126	+0.81%
2006	1,108	−1.60%
2007	1,084	−2.17%
2008	1,057	−2.49%
2009	1,047	−0.95%
2010	1,038	−0.86%
2011	1,016	−2.12%
2012	1,005	−1.08%
2013	1,004	−0.10%
2014	988	−1.59%
2015	979	−0.91%
2016	968	−1.12%
