= Pirow =

Pirow may refer to:

== People ==
- Brent Pirow (born 1959), South African tennis player
- Oswald Pirow (1890–1959), South African lawyer and politician

== Places ==
- Pirow, Brandenburg, Germany
