= Wolfgang Gans zu Putlitz =

German diplomat (1899-1975)

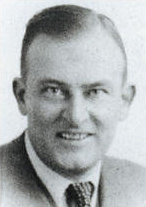
UK passport photo of Wolfgang zu Putlitz under the name William Putters, 1938

Wolfgang Gans Edler Herr zu Putlitz (German: [ˈvɔlfɡaŋ ˈɡans tsuː ˈpʊtlɪts]; 16 July 1899 – 3 September 1975) was a German diplomat. He resisted the Nazis and provided information to the British Secret Service. After the war, he became a communist and settled in the German Democratic Republic, whose nationality he assumed in 1952.

== Life ==
Gans zu Putlitz was born 16 July 1899 in Laaske, German Empire, today part of Putlitz, Germany. He came from a noble family in the Prignitz district of Brandenburg. He was the heir to Laaske Castle, which included extensive agricultural land. Gans zu Putlitz studied agriculture and economics in Berlin, where he received his doctorate in 1924.

Gans zu Putlitz entered the diplomatic service and was first posted to the German Consulate General in Poznań, Poland. In 1928, he was transferred to the Embassy in Washington, D.C. and then, in 1934, to Paris and then London, where he was appointed First Secretary in charge of the Consular Section.

Gans zu Putlitz became an agent of the British intelligence services because he did not approve of the war plans of the German National Socialists. On 1 November 1935, he joined the NSDAP, according to the records of German Foreign Service, and he was a member of the SS. When war broke out in 1939, Gans zu Putlitz was the second highest diplomat at the German embassy in the neutral Netherlands, a position from which he gave the British information on deployment plans and strength of the German troops. For the British intelligence officer Klop Ustinov (who was previously a German journalist and a press officer for the German Embassy in London), Gans zu Putlitz was one of the most important sources. It was, alleged MI5 Assistant Director Peter Wright, "priceless intelligence, possibly the most important human-source intelligence Britain received in the prewar period".

The Abwehr recruited an agent within the MI6 office in the Netherlands, Folkert van Koutrik, who supplied a list of British agents in the Netherlands. Gans zu Putlitz was shown this list and knew he had to seek asylum. In October 1939, he fled from the Netherlands to England, then to Jamaica, Haiti and the United States. Germany sentenced Gans zu Putlitz to death for high treason in absentia. From January 1944 to April 1945, he was assistant at Soldatensender Calais in England, a propaganda radio station.

With the war's end in 1945, Gans zu Putlitz returned to Germany on behalf of MI6. The British occupation authorities had him appointed senior executive officer and personal assistant to the Prime Minister of Schleswig-Holstein. However, as a known confidant of the occupying power, he was not tolerated in this position on a permanent basis. Via Switzerland and Paris, he returned to Britain. In 1948, he became a British citizen. Gans zu Putlitz acted as a witness for the prosecution at the Nuremberg Trials, testifying against war criminals in the German Foreign Service.

Gans zu Putlitz opposed the division of the country and the creation of the Federal Republic. Gans zu Putlitz returned to East Germany in January 1952. He worked as a freelance writer and editor for the publishing house Verlag Volk und Wissen in Bad Saarow and Berlin, which until German reunification published almost all textbooks in the DDR. He was a consultant for the East German Foreign Ministry and the Arbeitsgemeinschaft ehemaliger Offiziere, the association of former officers of the National Committee for a Free Germany (NKFD). He was a member and political associate of the National Council of the East German National Front.

Gans zu Putlitz died 3 September 1975 in Potsdam, German Democratic Republic. He was buried in the cemetery of Groß Kreutz at Potsdam.

== Awards ==
- East Germany's Ernst-Moritz-Arndt-Medaille, 1963

== Publications ==
- Unterwegs nach Deutschland. Erinnerungen eines ehemaligen Diplomaten. Verlag der Nation, Berlin 1974 (zuerst 1956). DDR-Lizenz-Nummer 400/77/67.
- Laaske, London und Haiti. Zeitgeschichtliche Miniaturen. Verlag der Nation, Berlin 1965.
- Groß- und Kleinbetriebe in der Landwirtschaft unter der Geldentwertung mit besonderer Berücksichtigung der Verhältnisse in der Prignitz. Univ., Diss., Berlin, 1924.
- The Putlitz Dossier. London: London Wingate; First Edition 1957 ASIN: B0006DAD6C.
- Braunbuch. Kriegs- und Naziverbrecher in der Bundesrepublik. Staat, Wirtschaft, Armee, Verwaltung, Justiz, Wissenschaft. Edited by the National Council of the National Front of Democratic Germany and the Documentation Centre of the State Archives Administration of the GDR, Berlin 1965. (Gans zu Putlitz provided input on former Nazis in the service of the Foreign Ministry of the Federal Republic.)
