= Putlitz-Berge =

Collective municipality in Brandenburg, Germany

- Amt
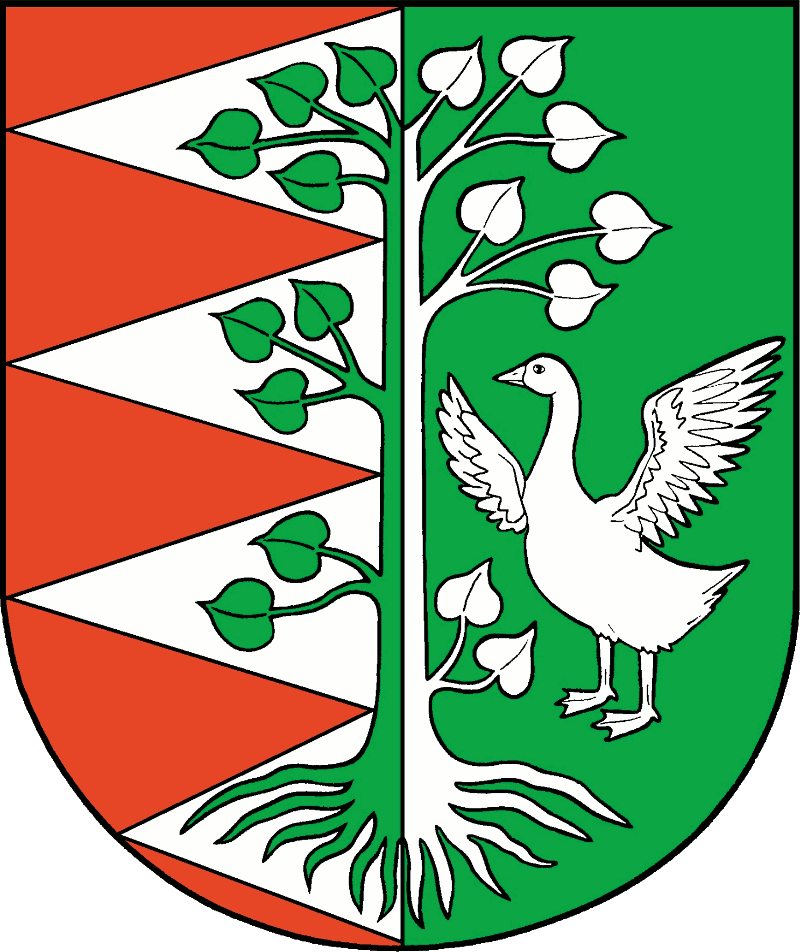
- Coat of arms

- Map of Prignitz highlighting Putlitz-Berge
- Interactive map of Putlitz-Berge
- Location within Germany Location within Brandenburg
- Coordinates: 53°15′N 12°03′E
- Country: Germany
- State: Brandenburg
- District: Prignitz
- Seat: Putlitz
- Subdivisions: 5 municipalities

Area
  - Total: 240.24 km^{2} (92.76 sq mi)

Population (2025-12-31)
  - Total: 4,613
  - Density: 19.20/km^{2} (49.73/sq mi)
- Time zone: UTC+01:00 (CET)
  - Summer (DST): UTC+02:00 (CEST)
- Website: www.amtputlitz-berge.de

Amt Putlitz-Berge is an Amt ("collective municipality") in the district of Prignitz, in Brandenburg, Germany. Its seat is in Putlitz.

The Amt Putlitz-Berge consists of the following municipalities:

1. Berge
2. Gülitz-Reetz
3. Pirow
4. Putlitz
5. Triglitz

== Demography ==
Development of population since 1875 within the current Boundaries (Blue Line: Population; Dotted Line: Comparison to Population development in Brandenburg state; Grey Background: Time of Nazi Germany; Red Background: Time of communist East Germany)

Recent Population Development and Projections (Population Development before Census 2011 (blue line); Recent Population Development according to the Census in Germany in 2011 (blue bordered line); Official projections for 2005-2030 (yellow line); for 2017-2030 (scarlet line); for 2020-2030 (green line)

Amt Putlitz-Berge: Population development
within the current boundaries (2020)

Year	Pop.	±% p.a.
1875	8,979	—
1890	8,318	−0.51%
1910	8,370	+0.03%
1925	8,637	+0.21%
1939	8,077	−0.48%
1950	12,197	+3.82%
1964	9,105	−2.07%
1971	8,854	−0.40%
1981	7,250	−1.98%

Year	Pop.	±% p.a.
1985	6,914	−1.18%
1990	6,708	−0.60%
1995	6,252	−1.40%
2000	6,055	−0.64%
2005	5,618	−1.49%
2010	5,096	−1.93%
2015	4,932	−0.65%
2020	4,781	−0.62%
2025	4,613	−0.71%
