= Gerdshagen =

- Municipality
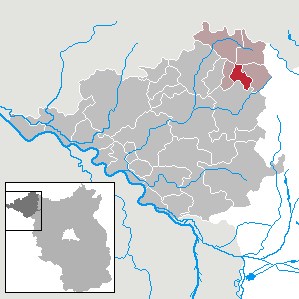
- Location of Gerdshagen within Prignitz district
- Interactive map of Gerdshagen
- Location within Germany Location within Brandenburg
- Coordinates: 53°15′N 12°12′E
- Country: Germany
- State: Brandenburg
- District: Prignitz
- Municipal assoc.: Meyenburg
- Subdivisions: 3

Government
  - Mayor (2024–29): Robert Gemmel (SPD)

Area
  - Total: 22.55 km^{2} (8.71 sq mi)
- Elevation: 87 m (285 ft)

Population (2025-12-31)
  - Total: 452
  - Density: 20.0/km^{2} (51.9/sq mi)
- Time zone: UTC+01:00 (CET)
  - Summer (DST): UTC+02:00 (CEST)
- Postal codes: 16928
- Dialling codes: 033968
- Vehicle registration: PR
- Website: Gerdshagen

Gerdshagen is a municipality in the Prignitz district, in Brandenburg, Germany.

== Demography ==
Development of Population since 1875 within the Current Boundaries (Blue Line: Population; Dotted Line: Comparison to Population Development of Brandenburg state; Grey Background: Time of Nazi rule; Red Background: Time of Communist rule)

Gerdshagen: Population development
within the current boundaries (2013)

Year	Pop.	±% p.a.
1875	427	—
1890	359	−1.15%
1910	467	+1.32%
1925	609	+1.79%
1933	566	−0.91%
1939	506	−1.85%
1946	961	+9.60%
1950	926	−0.92%
1964	816	−0.90%
1971	815	−0.02%
1981	642	−2.36%
1985	612	−1.19%
1989	628	+0.65%
1990	626	−0.32%
1991	603	−3.67%
1992	610	+1.16%
1993	632	+3.61%
1994	654	+3.48%
1995	669	+2.29%
1996	670	+0.15%

Year	Pop.	±% p.a.
1997	657	−1.94%
1998	658	+0.15%
1999	658	+0.00%
2000	651	−1.06%
2001	648	−0.46%
2002	631	−2.62%
2003	635	+0.63%
2004	629	−0.94%
2005	612	−2.70%
2006	589	−3.76%
2007	584	−0.85%
2008	573	−1.88%
2009	547	−4.54%
2010	535	−2.19%
2011	537	+0.37%
2012	540	+0.56%
2013	530	−1.85%
2014	520	−1.89%
2015	505	−2.88%
2016	499	−1.19%
