= Lenzerwische =

- Municipality
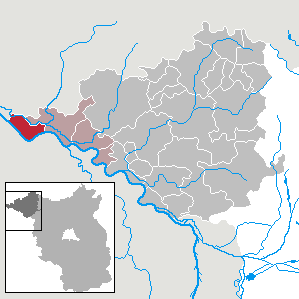
- Location of Lenzerwische within Prignitz district
- Interactive map of Lenzerwische
- Location within Germany Location within Brandenburg
- Coordinates: 53°06′00″N 11°16′59″E
- Country: Germany
- State: Brandenburg
- District: Prignitz
- Municipal assoc.: Lenzen-Elbtalaue

Government
  - Mayor (2024–29): Nadine Mewes

Area
  - Total: 41.94 km^{2} (16.19 sq mi)
- Elevation: 17 m (56 ft)

Population (2025-12-31)
  - Total: 439
  - Density: 10.5/km^{2} (27.1/sq mi)
- Time zone: UTC+01:00 (CET)
  - Summer (DST): UTC+02:00 (CEST)
- Postal codes: 19309
- Dialling codes: 038758
- Vehicle registration: PR

Lenzerwische is a municipality in the Prignitz district, in Brandenburg, Germany.

== Demography ==
Development of Population since 1875 within the Current Boundaries (Blue Line: Population; Dotted Line: Comparison to Population Development of Brandenburg state; Grey Background: Time of Nazi rule; Red Background: Time of Communist rule)

Lenzerwische: Population development
within the current boundaries (2013)

Year	Pop.	±% p.a.
1875	1,918	—
1890	1,859	−0.21%
1910	1,674	−0.52%
1925	1,648	−0.10%
1933	1,446	−1.62%
1939	1,352	−1.11%
1946	1,504	+1.53%
1950	1,576	+1.18%
1964	988	−3.28%
1971	948	−0.59%
1981	684	−3.21%
1985	663	−0.78%
1989	641	−0.84%
1990	630	−1.72%
1991	603	−4.29%
1992	600	−0.50%
1993	593	−1.17%
1994	585	−1.35%
1995	570	−2.56%
1996	570	+0.00%

Year	Pop.	±% p.a.
1997	545	−4.39%
1998	547	+0.37%
1999	555	+1.46%
2000	564	+1.62%
2001	553	−1.95%
2002	534	−3.44%
2003	525	−1.69%
2004	534	+1.71%
2005	536	+0.37%
2006	534	−0.37%
2007	523	−2.06%
2008	514	−1.72%
2009	516	+0.39%
2010	510	−1.16%
2011	484	−5.10%
2012	483	−0.21%
2013	473	−2.07%
2014	473	+0.00%
2015	466	−1.48%
2016	449	−3.65%
