= Kümmernitztal =

- Municipality
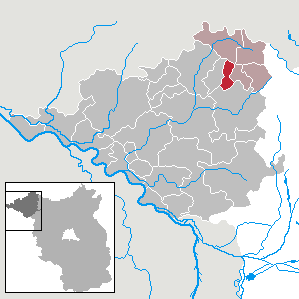
- Location of Kümmernitztal within Prignitz district
- Interactive map of Kümmernitztal
- Location within Germany Location within Brandenburg
- Coordinates: 53°13′59″N 12°09′00″E
- Country: Germany
- State: Brandenburg
- District: Prignitz
- Municipal assoc.: Meyenburg

Government
  - Mayor (2024–29): Steffen Sadowski

Area
  - Total: 20.21 km^{2} (7.80 sq mi)
- Elevation: 81 m (266 ft)

Population (2025-12-31)
  - Total: 353
  - Density: 17.5/km^{2} (45.2/sq mi)
- Time zone: UTC+01:00 (CET)
  - Summer (DST): UTC+02:00 (CEST)
- Postal codes: 16945
- Dialling codes: 033968, 033986
- Vehicle registration: PR
- Website: www.amtmeyenburg.de

Kümmernitztal is a municipality in the Prignitz district, in Brandenburg, Germany.

== History ==
The municipality of Kümmernitztal was formed in 2001 as the result of the fusion of the municipalities of Grabow-Buckow and Preddöhl. From 1815 to 1945, the constituent localities of Kümmernitztal were part of the Prussian Province of Brandenburg. From 1952 to 1990, they were part of the Bezirk Potsdam of East Germany.

== Demography ==
Development of Population since 1875 within the Current Boundaries (Blue Line: Population; Dotted Line: Comparison to Population Development of Brandenburg state; Grey Background: Time of Nazi rule; Red Background: Time of Communist rule)

Kümmernitztal: Population development
within the current boundaries (2013)

Year	Pop.	±% p.a.
1875	1,014	—
1890	857	−1.12%
1910	834	−0.14%
1925	852	+0.14%
1933	811	−0.61%
1939	964	+2.92%
1946	1,252	+3.80%
1950	1,209	−0.87%
1964	786	−3.03%
1971	730	−1.05%
1981	492	−3.87%
1985	460	−1.67%
1989	466	+0.32%
1990	454	−2.58%
1991	450	−0.88%
1992	438	−2.67%
1993	449	+2.51%
1994	442	−1.56%
1995	434	−1.81%
1996	438	+0.92%

Year	Pop.	±% p.a.
1997	429	−2.05%
1998	432	+0.70%
1999	419	−3.01%
2000	426	+1.67%
2001	424	−0.47%
2002	419	−1.18%
2003	422	+0.72%
2004	411	−2.61%
2005	402	−2.19%
2006	398	−1.00%
2007	394	−1.01%
2008	378	−4.06%
2009	379	+0.26%
2010	368	−2.90%
2011	370	+0.54%
2012	371	+0.27%
2013	374	+0.81%
2014	376	+0.53%
2015	371	−1.33%
2016	382	+2.96%
