= Lenzen-Elbtalaue =

- Amt
- Map of Prignitz highlighting Lenzen-Elbtalaue
- Interactive map of Lenzen-Elbtalaue
- Location within Germany Location within Brandenburg
- Coordinates: 53°05′N 11°28′E
- Country: Germany
- State: Brandenburg
- District: Prignitz
- Seat: Lenzen (Elbe)
- Subdivisions: 4 municipalities

Area
  - Total: 220.79 km^{2} (85.25 sq mi)

Population (2025-12-31)
  - Total: 3,829
  - Density: 17.34/km^{2} (44.92/sq mi)
- Time zone: UTC+01:00 (CET)
  - Summer (DST): UTC+02:00 (CEST)
- Website: www.amtlenzen.de

Amt Lenzen-Elbtalaue is an Amt ("collective municipality") in the district of Prignitz, in Brandenburg, Germany. Its seat is in Lenzen (Elbe).

The Amt Lenzen-Elbtalaue consists of the following municipalities:

1. Cumlosen
2. Lanz
3. Lenzen (Elbe)
4. Lenzerwische

== Demography ==
Development of population since 1875 within the current Boundaries (Blue Line: Population; Dotted Line: Comparison to Population development in Brandenburg state; Grey Background: Time of Nazi Germany; Red Background: Time of communist East Germany)

Recent Population Development and Projections (Population Development before Census 2011 (blue line); Recent Population Development according to the Census in Germany in 2011 (blue bordered line); Official projections for 2005-2030 (yellow line); for 2017-2030 (scarlet line); for 2020-2030 (green line)

Amt Lenzen-Elbtalaue: Population development
within the current boundaries (2020)

Year	Pop.	±% p.a.
1875	9,541	—
1890	8,932	−0.44%
1910	8,295	−0.37%
1925	8,443	+0.12%
1939	8,003	−0.38%
1950	10,497	+2.50%
1964	7,630	−2.25%
1971	7,310	−0.61%
1981	6,115	−1.77%

Year	Pop.	±% p.a.
1985	5,959	−0.64%
1990	5,761	−0.67%
1995	5,390	−1.32%
2000	5,222	−0.63%
2005	4,947	−1.08%
2010	4,507	−1.85%
2015	4,164	−1.57%
2020	3,953	−1.03%
2025	3,829	−0.64%
