= Meyenburg (Amt) =

- Amt
- Map of Prignitz highlighting Meyenburg
- Interactive map of Meyenburg
- Location within Germany Location within Brandenburg
- Coordinates: 53°19′N 12°15′E
- Country: Germany
- State: Brandenburg
- District: Prignitz
- Seat: Meyenburg
- Subdivisions: 5 municipalities

Area
  - Total: 211.49 km^{2} (81.66 sq mi)

Population (2025-12-31)
  - Total: 3,993
  - Density: 18.88/km^{2} (48.90/sq mi)
- Time zone: UTC+01:00 (CET)
  - Summer (DST): UTC+02:00 (CEST)
- Website: www.amtmeyenburg.de

Amt Meyenburg is an Amt ("collective municipality") in the district of Prignitz, in Brandenburg, Germany. Its seat is in Meyenburg.

The Amt Meyenburg consists of the following municipalities:

1. Gerdshagen
2. Halenbeck-Rohlsdorf
3. Kümmernitztal
4. Marienfließ
5. Meyenburg

== Demography ==
Development of population since 1875 within the current Boundaries (Blue Line: Population; Dotted Line: Comparison to Population development in Brandenburg state; Grey Background: Time of Nazi Germany; Red Background: Time of communist East Germany)

Recent Population Development and Projections (Population Development before Census 2011 (blue line); Recent Population Development according to the Census in Germany in 2011 (blue bordered line); Projection by the Brandenburg state for 2005-2030 (yellow line); Projection by the Brandenburg state for 2017-2030 (velvet line); Projection by the Brandenburg state for 2020-2030 (green line))

Amt Meyenburg: Population development
within the current boundaries (2020)

Year	Pop.	±% p.a.
1875	6,001	—
1890	5,960	−0.05%
1910	6,540	+0.47%
1925	7,143	+0.59%
1939	6,890	−0.26%
1950	10,527	+3.93%
1964	7,919	−2.01%
1971	7,646	−0.50%
1981	6,323	−1.88%

Year	Pop.	±% p.a.
1985	6,239	−0.33%
1990	5,973	−0.87%
1995	5,776	−0.67%
2000	5,506	−0.95%
2005	5,086	−1.57%
2010	4,577	−2.09%
2015	4,258	−1.43%
2020	4,170	−0.42%
2025	3,993	−0.86%
