= Triglitz =

- Municipality
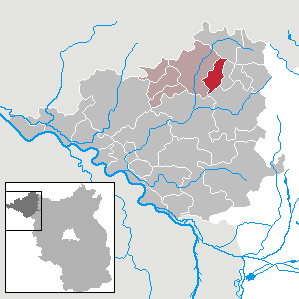
- Location of Triglitz within Prignitz district
- Interactive map of Triglitz
- Location within Germany Location within Brandenburg
- Coordinates: 53°13′00″N 12°05′59″E
- Country: Germany
- State: Brandenburg
- District: Prignitz
- Municipal assoc.: Putlitz-Berge
- Subdivisions: 3 Ortsteile

Government
  - Mayor (2024–29): Peter Brockmann

Area
  - Total: 31.53 km^{2} (12.17 sq mi)
- Elevation: 62 m (203 ft)

Population (2025-12-31)
  - Total: 493
  - Density: 15.6/km^{2} (40.5/sq mi)
- Time zone: UTC+01:00 (CET)
  - Summer (DST): UTC+02:00 (CEST)
- Postal codes: 16949
- Dialling codes: 033981
- Vehicle registration: PR
- Website: www.amtputlitz-berge.de

Triglitz is a municipality in the Prignitz district, in Brandenburg, Germany.

== History ==
From 1815 to 1945, Triglitz was part of the Prussian Province of Brandenburg. From 1952 to 1990, it was part of the Bezirk Potsdam of East Germany.

== Demography ==
Development of Population since 1875 within the Current Boundaries (Blue Line: Population; Dotted Line: Comparison to Population Development of Brandenburg state; Grey Background: Time of Nazi rule; Red Background: Time of Communist rule)

Triglitz: Population development
within the current boundaries (2013)

| Year | Pop. | ±% p.a. |
|---|---|---|
| 1875 | 962 | — |
| 1890 | 863 | −0.72% |
| 1910 | 941 | +0.43% |
| 1925 | 929 | −0.09% |
| 1933 | 900 | −0.40% |
| 1939 | 854 | −0.87% |
| 1946 | 1,294 | +6.12% |
| 1950 | 1,247 | −0.92% |
| 1964 | 928 | −2.09% |
| 1971 | 862 | −1.05% |
| 1981 | 675 | −2.42% |
| 1985 | 670 | −0.19% |
| 1989 | 636 | −1.29% |
| 1990 | 632 | −0.63% |
| 1991 | 607 | −3.96% |
| 1992 | 611 | +0.66% |
| 1993 | 602 | −1.47% |
| 1994 | 615 | +2.16% |
| 1995 | 613 | −0.33% |
| 1996 | 612 | −0.16% |

| Year | Pop. | ±% p.a. |
|---|---|---|
| 1997 | 616 | +0.65% |
| 1998 | 611 | −0.81% |
| 1999 | 614 | +0.49% |
| 2000 | 642 | +4.56% |
| 2001 | 617 | −3.89% |
| 2002 | 620 | +0.49% |
| 2003 | 587 | −5.32% |
| 2004 | 577 | −1.70% |
| 2005 | 567 | −1.73% |
| 2006 | 578 | +1.94% |
| 2007 | 561 | −2.94% |
| 2008 | 548 | −2.32% |
| 2009 | 549 | +0.18% |
| 2010 | 531 | −3.28% |
| 2011 | 504 | −5.08% |
| 2012 | 498 | −1.19% |
| 2013 | 493 | −1.00% |
| 2014 | 478 | −3.04% |
| 2015 | 486 | +1.67% |
| 2016 | 477 | −1.85% |
