= Halenbeck-Rohlsdorf =

- Municipality
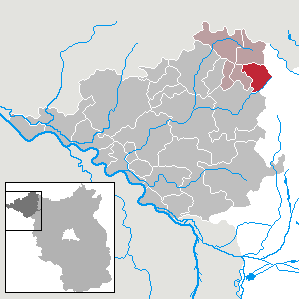
- Location of Halenbeck-Rohlsdorf within Prignitz district
- Interactive map of Halenbeck-Rohlsdorf
- Location within Germany Location within Brandenburg
- Coordinates: 53°15′00″N 12°19′00″E
- Country: Germany
- State: Brandenburg
- District: Prignitz
- Municipal assoc.: Meyenburg

Government
  - Mayor (2019–24): Astrid Eckert

Area
  - Total: 39.45 km^{2} (15.23 sq mi)
- Elevation: 90 m (300 ft)

Population (2025-12-31)
  - Total: 505
  - Density: 12.8/km^{2} (33.2/sq mi)
- Time zone: UTC+01:00 (CET)
  - Summer (DST): UTC+02:00 (CEST)
- Postal codes: 16928, 16945
- Dialling codes: 033986, 033989
- Vehicle registration: PR
- Website: www.amtmeyenburg.de

Halenbeck-Rohlsdorf is a municipality in the Prignitz district, in Brandenburg, Germany.

== Demography ==
Development of Population since 1875 within the Current Boundaries (Blue Line: Population; Dotted Line: Comparison to Population Development of Brandenburg state; Grey Background: Time of Nazi rule; Red Background: Time of Communist rule)

Halenbeck-Rohlsdorf: Population development
within the current boundaries (2013)

Year	Pop.	±% p.a.
1875	1,002	—
1890	933	−0.47%
1910	950	+0.09%
1925	1,003	+0.36%
1933	964	−0.49%
1939	898	−1.18%
1946	1,556	+8.17%
1950	1,539	−0.27%
1964	1,115	−2.28%
1971	1,019	−1.28%
1981	849	−1.81%
1985	859	+0.29%
1989	828	−0.91%
1990	796	−3.86%
1991	761	−4.40%
1992	879	+15.51%
1993	929	+5.69%
1994	791	−14.85%
1995	764	−3.41%
1996	773	+1.18%

Year	Pop.	±% p.a.
1997	753	−2.59%
1998	733	−2.66%
1999	739	+0.82%
2000	747	+1.08%
2001	728	−2.54%
2002	728	+0.00%
2003	725	−0.41%
2004	707	−2.48%
2005	680	−3.82%
2006	661	−2.79%
2007	659	−0.30%
2008	635	−3.64%
2009	624	−1.73%
2010	601	−3.69%
2011	562	−6.49%
2012	547	−2.67%
2013	564	+3.11%
2014	561	−0.53%
2015	546	−2.67%
2016	526	−3.66%
