= Bad Wilsnack/Weisen =

- Amt
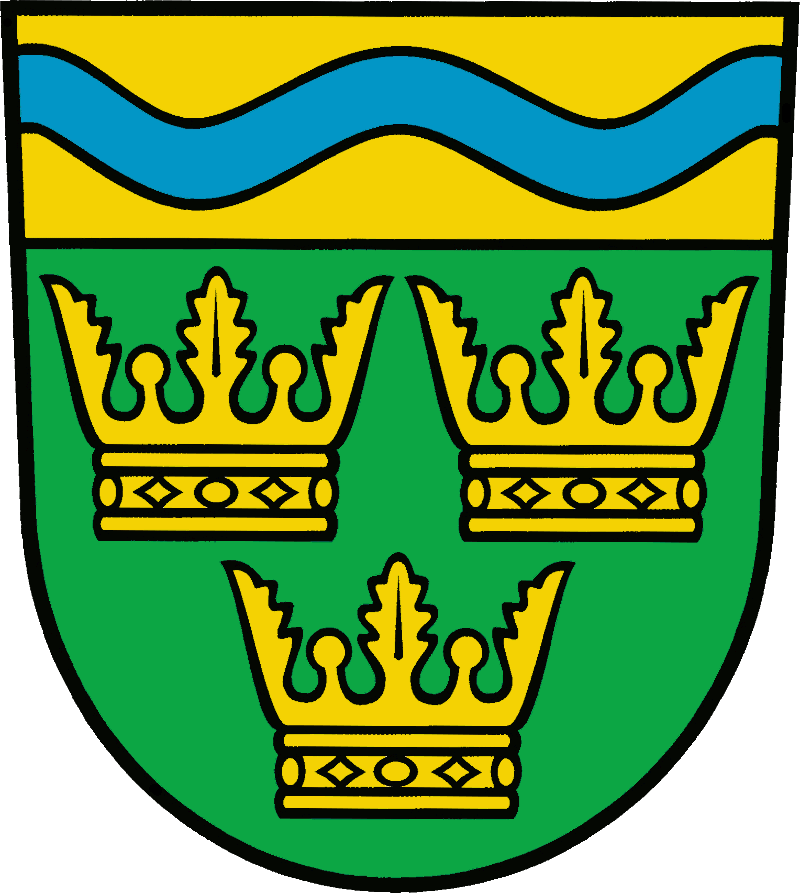
- Coat of arms

- Map of Prignitz highlighting Bad Wilsnack/Weisen
- Interactive map of Bad Wilsnack/Weisen
- Location within Germany Location within Brandenburg
- Coordinates: 52°57′N 11°57′E
- Country: Germany
- State: Brandenburg
- District: Prignitz
- Seat: Bad Wilsnack
- Subdivisions: 5 municipalities

Area
  - Total: 189.74 km^{2} (73.26 sq mi)

Population (2025-12-31)
  - Total: 6,032
  - Density: 31.79/km^{2} (82.34/sq mi)
- Time zone: UTC+01:00 (CET)
  - Summer (DST): UTC+02:00 (CEST)
- Website: www.amtbww.de

Amt Bad Wilsnack/Weisen is an Amt ("collective municipality") in the district of Prignitz, in Brandenburg, Germany. Its seat is in Bad Wilsnack.

== Municipalities ==
The Amt Bad Wilsnack/Weisen consists of the following municipalities:

1. Bad Wilsnack
2. Breese
3. Legde/Quitzöbel
4. Rühstädt
5. Weisen

== Demographics ==
Development of population since 1875 within the current Boundaries (Blue Line: Population; Dotted Line: Comparison to Population development in Brandenburg state; Grey Background: Time of Nazi Germany; Red Background: Time of communist East Germany)

Recent Population Development and Projections (Population Development before Census 2011 (blue line); Recent Population Development according to the Census in Germany in 2011 (blue bordered line); Official projections for 2005-2030 (yellow line); for 2017-2030 (scarlet line);; for 2020-2030 (green line)

Amt Bad Wilsnack/Weisen: Population development
within the current boundaries (2020)

Year	Pop.	±% p.a.
1875	7,763	—
1890	7,614	−0.13%
1910	7,480	−0.09%
1925	8,281	+0.68%
1939	9,243	+0.79%
1950	12,378	+2.69%
1964	9,751	−1.69%
1971	9,324	−0.64%
1981	7,964	−1.56%

Year	Pop.	±% p.a.
1985	7,746	−0.69%
1990	7,328	−1.10%
1995	6,992	−0.93%
2000	7,342	+0.98%
2005	6,921	−1.17%
2010	6,454	−1.39%
2015	6,098	−1.13%
2020	6,091	−0.02%
2025	6,032	−0.19%
