= Rühstädt =

- Municipality
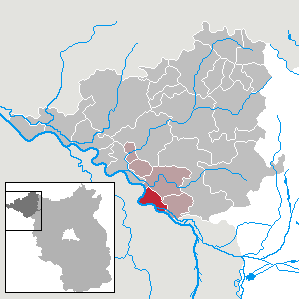
- Location of Rühstädt within Prignitz district
- Interactive map of Rühstädt
- Location within Germany Location within Brandenburg
- Coordinates: 52°55′09″N 11°52′12″E
- Country: Germany
- State: Brandenburg
- District: Prignitz
- Municipal assoc.: Bad Wilsnack/Weisen
- Subdivisions: 4 Ortsteile

Government
  - Mayor (2024–29): Heike Warnke (Ind.)

Area
  - Total: 28.99 km^{2} (11.19 sq mi)
- Elevation: 22 m (72 ft)

Population (2025-12-31)
  - Total: 491
  - Density: 16.9/km^{2} (43.9/sq mi)
- Time zone: UTC+01:00 (CET)
  - Summer (DST): UTC+02:00 (CEST)
- Postal codes: 19322
- Dialling codes: 038791
- Vehicle registration: PR

Rühstädt (German pronunciation: [ˈʁyːʃtɛt]) is a municipality in the Prignitz district, in Brandenburg, Germany. It is located close to the confluence of the rivers Havel and Elbe. Rühstädt is famous for its high number of resident white storks and has been awarded the title European Stork Village by the initiative EuroNatur in 1996.

== Demography ==
Development of Population since 1875 within the Current Boundaries (Blue Line: Population; Dotted Line: Comparison to Population Development of Brandenburg state; Grey Background: Time of Nazi rule; Red Background: Time of Communist rule)

Rühstädt: Population development
within the current boundaries (2013)

Year	Pop.	±% p.a.
1875	1,257	—
1890	1,246	−0.06%
1910	1,139	−0.45%
1925	1,110	−0.17%
1933	1,018	−1.08%
1939	1,020	+0.03%
1946	1,442	+5.07%
1950	1,476	+0.58%
1964	1,015	−2.64%
1971	973	−0.60%
1981	762	−2.41%
1985	702	−2.03%
1989	673	−1.05%
1990	663	−1.49%
1991	638	−3.77%
1992	619	−2.98%
1993	614	−0.81%
1994	632	+2.93%
1995	619	−2.06%
1996	627	+1.29%

Year	Pop.	±% p.a.
1997	649	+3.51%
1998	624	−3.85%
1999	610	−2.24%
2000	601	−1.48%
2001	601	+0.00%
2002	590	−1.83%
2003	598	+1.36%
2004	595	−0.50%
2005	582	−2.18%
2006	564	−3.09%
2007	553	−1.95%
2008	558	+0.90%
2009	558	+0.00%
2010	565	+1.25%
2011	499	−11.68%
2012	487	−2.40%
2013	481	−1.23%
2014	468	−2.70%
2015	461	−1.50%
2016	472	+2.39%
