= Von Plotho =

German noble family

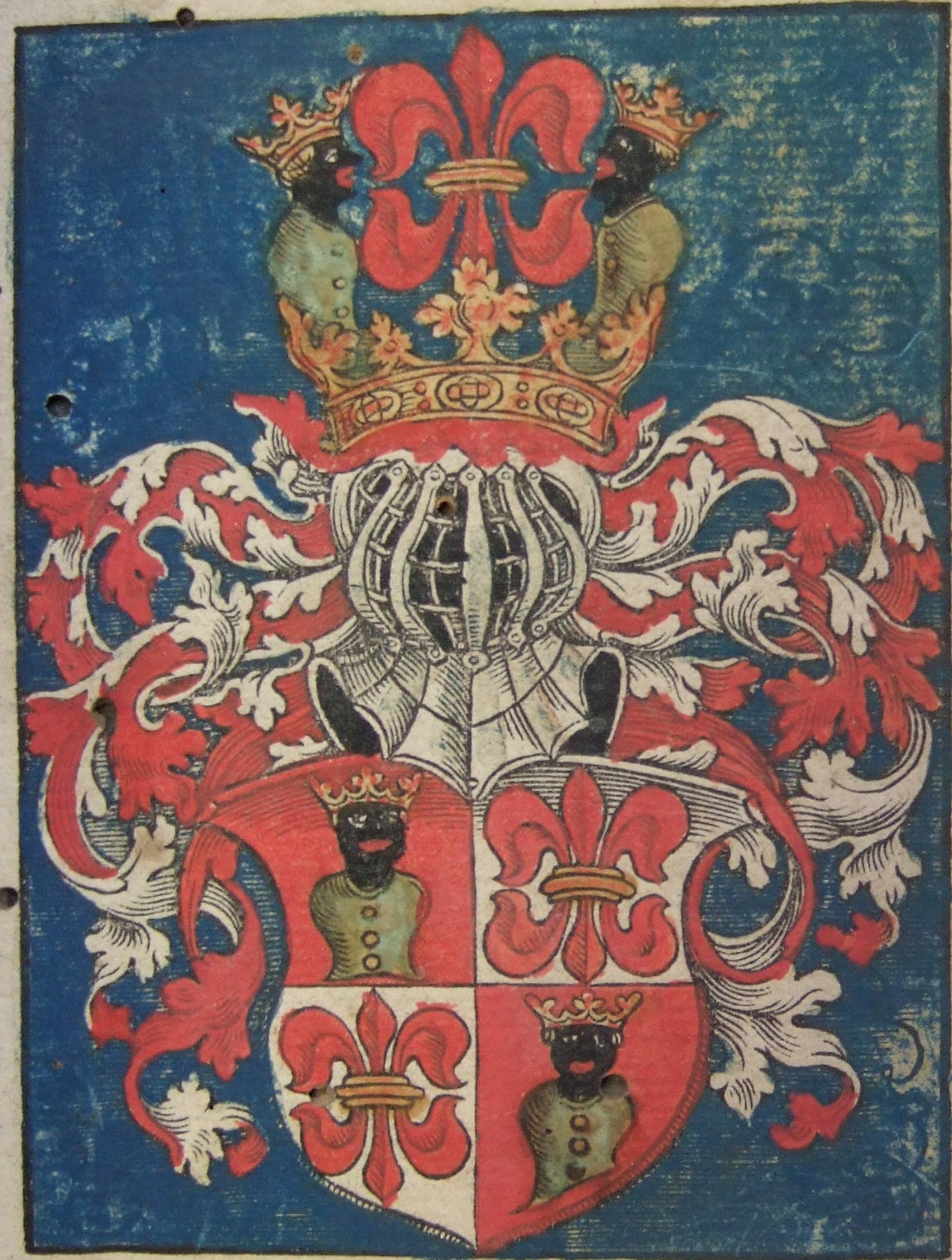
Coat of arms of the Plotho family

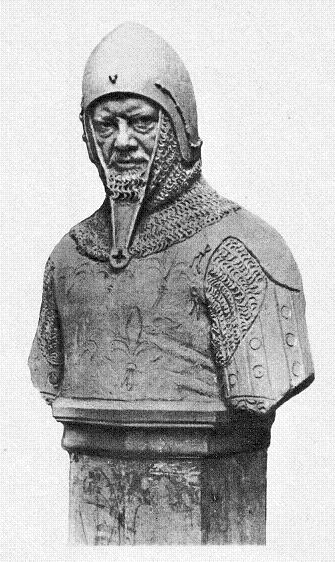
Wedigo von Plotho, who saved the life of Margrave Waldemar at Gransee in 1316. Sculpted by August Kraus and unveiled in 1900, with the caricaturist Heinrich Zille serving as the model for this bust.

The Plotho family or von Plotho (German pronunciation: [fɔn ˈploːto]) is an ancient German noble family traditionally believed to be of Wendish origin, particularly associated with the Prignitz region in Brandenburg.

== History ==
The family is documented as early as 946 in a writ of Otto the Great as already in possession of their ancient seat at Burg Plote in Altenplathow, Elb-Havelland in Brandenburg. Its line of recorded continuous descent dates from the 12th century, with Hermann I von Plotho.

The family's extensive possessions, from the 11th and 12th centuries, centred on the old Prignitz region and included Kyritz, Wusterhausen and Genthin, the territory of Schollene, the castle at Plote (Altenplathow), the Gaue of Lietzici, Zemzizi and Drenzile, and the lordship of Parey. It was also closely associated with the Bishops of Magdeburg: Hermann I, whose Romanesque monumental effigy is still to be seen in the church of Altenplathow was a vassal of the bishops and other members of the family were canons of Magdeburg Cathedral. Its vassals included the von Blumenthal family, whom it brought from Blumenthal in the diocese of Magdeburg to Blumenthal in the Prignitz.

In the Middle Ages, the family ramified throughout Northern Germany and numerous different branches descend from them—among others, the lines of von Plotho zu Grabow, Räckendorf, Codlewe and Zerben, and of particular note the Flanders branch of von Plotho zu Ingelmunster—many of which survive today. In 1643, Wolfgang Edler von Plotho was made a Baron of the Holy Roman Empire by Emperor Ferdinand III for his military services.

In modern times, the family is best known for the fact that Elisabeth von Plotho (1853–1952) was the model for Effi Briest in Theodore Fontane's novel of that name.

== Notable von Plothos ==
- Wedigo von Plotho^{(DE)}
- Carl von Plotho^{(DE)}
- Ludwig von Plotho^{(DE)}
- Elisabeth von Plotho^{(DE)}
- Wilfried von Plotho^{(DE)}

Note: ^{(DE)} links point to the German Wikipedia

=== See also ===
- Manfred von Ardenne
- Effi Briest

== Sources ==
Plotho, Erich-Christoph Freiherr von, 2007. Ritter, Domherren und Obristen: Familienchronik der Edlen Herren und Freiherrn von Plotho. G.A. Starke Verlag: Limburg an der Lahn. ISBN 978-3-7980-0579-2
