= Bernard, Margrave of the Nordmark =

Bernard
- Margrave of the Nordmark
- Tenure: 1018 – 1051
- Died: 1051
- Issue: William, Margrave of the Nordmark; Conrad of Haldensleben; Theutberga of Haldensleben; Oda of Haldensleben; Othelindis, Countess of Holland; Otto, Margrave of the Nordmark
- Father: Bernard I

Bernard II of Haldensleben (or Bernhard) (died 1051) was the Margrave of the Nordmark from 1018 until his death. He was the grandson of Dietrich of Haldensleben and a rival of the counts of Walbeck, one of whom, Werner, succeeded him in the march following his deposition.

In 1016–1017, his father, Bernard I (1009–1018), feuded with Gero, Archbishop of Magdeburg, and consequently with the Emperor Henry II over the ambitions of the Magdeburger church. The Emperor intervened and forced Bernard I to pay Gero 500 lbs of silver in compensation for the assault his men had made on the city of Magdeburg. Bernard I was treated as an equal of his legal lord, the Duke of Saxony. Then Bernard II, in a 1028 letter of the Emperor Conrad II concerning the slaves of the church of Verden, which was located in the provinces "to whom we [Conrad] have committed [to the Bernards] the rule."

He married a daughter of Vladimir the Great, Grand Prince of Kiev. He was succeeded as margrave by his eldest son William, in 1051. His second son, Conrad, succeeded to Haldensleben. He also left daughters, Theutberga, Oda, and perhaps Othelindis, wife of Dirk III, Count of Holland. His illegitimate son by a Slav mistress, Otto, tried to succeed his brother, but was defeated and killed in battle.

== Sources ==
- Reuter, Timothy. Germany in the Early Middle Ages 800–1056. New York: Longman, 1991.
