= Berge (surname) =

Berge is a surname originating from the Province of Gaul. It is a topographical surname, for someone who lived up a steep bank.

== Notable people with this name include ==
- Aurore Bergé (born 1986), French politician
- Claude Berge (1926–2002), French mathematician
- Georges Bergé (1909–1997), French army general
- Gunnar Berge (born 1940), Norwegian politician
- Friedrich Berge (1811–1883), German naturalist and entomologist
- Håkon Berge (born 1954), Norwegian composer
- Irénée Berge (1867–1926), French composer
- Klaus Berge (born 1961), German football player
- Niels van den Berge (born 1984), Dutch politician
- Pierre Bergé (1930–2017), French industrialist
- Ragnar Berge (1925–1995), Norwegian football player
- Rinus van den Berge (1900–1972), Dutch athlete
- Sander Berge (born 1998), Norwegian football player
- Sigurd Berge (1929–2002), Norwegian composer
- Svein Berge, Norwegian electronic musician
- Victor Berge (1891–1974), Swedish diver and author
