= Gülitz-Reetz =

- Municipality
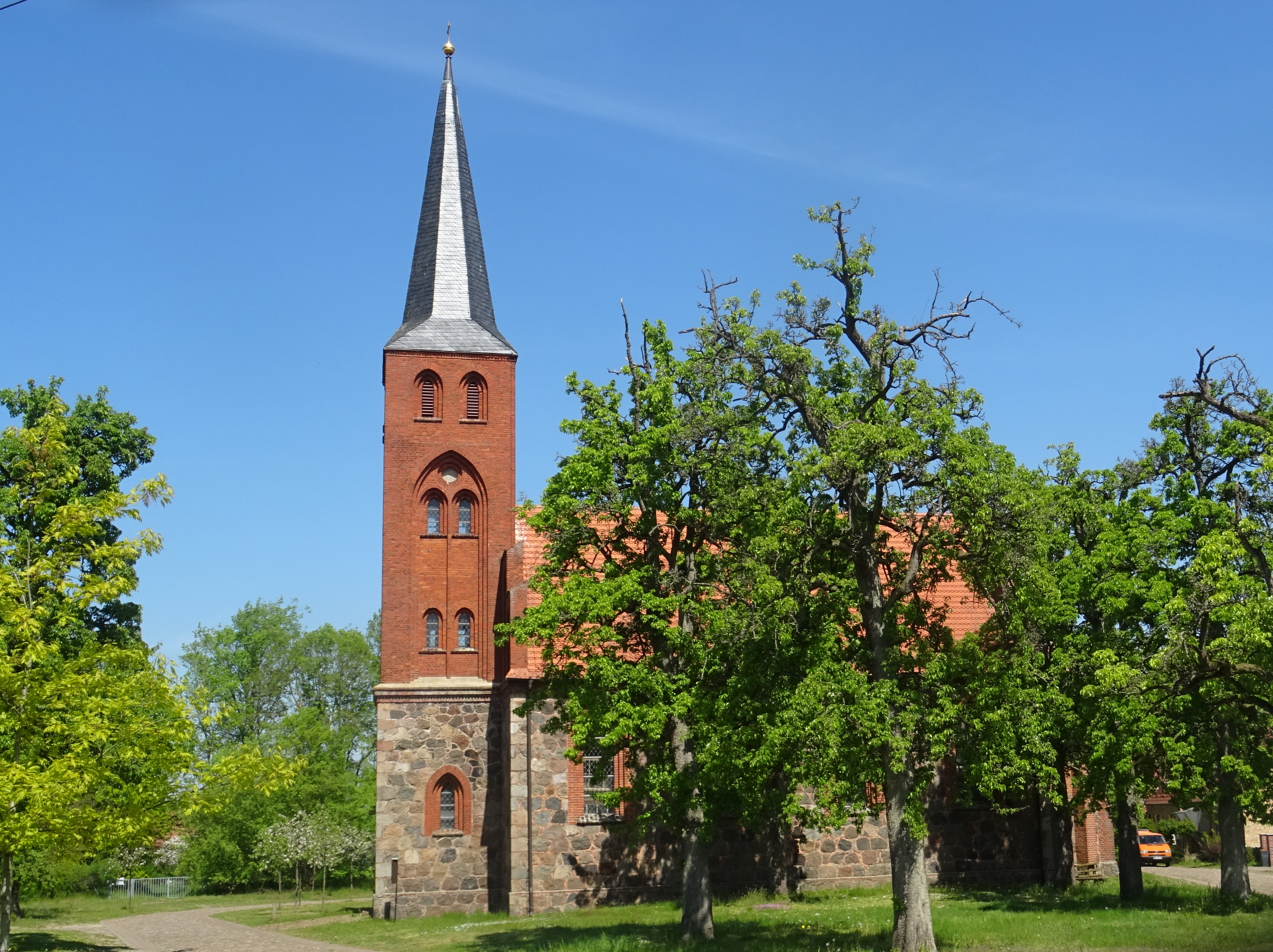
- Church in Gülitz

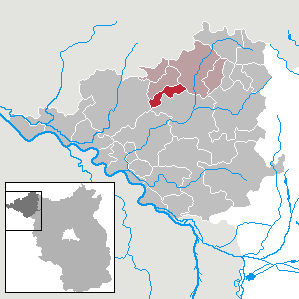
- Location of Gülitz-Reetz within Prignitz district
- Interactive map of Gülitz-Reetz
- Location within Germany Location within Brandenburg
- Coordinates: 53°12′00″N 11°58′59″E
- Country: Germany
- State: Brandenburg
- District: Prignitz
- Municipal assoc.: Putlitz-Berge

Government
  - Mayor (2024–29): Detlef Spiegelberg

Area
  - Total: 24.27 km^{2} (9.37 sq mi)
- Elevation: 50–70 m (160–230 ft)

Population (2025-12-31)
  - Total: 455
  - Density: 18.7/km^{2} (48.6/sq mi)
- Time zone: UTC+01:00 (CET)
  - Summer (DST): UTC+02:00 (CEST)
- Postal codes: 19348
- Dialling codes: 038782
- Vehicle registration: PR

Gülitz-Reetz is a municipality in the Prignitz district, in Brandenburg, in northern Germany.

== History ==
During the final stages of World War II, on 8 March 1945, Gülitz was the site of a stopover during the German-organised march of French prisoners of war from the Oflag II-B camp headed westwards.

== Demography ==
Development of population since 1875 within the current boundaries (Blue line: Population; Dotted line: Comparison to population development of Brandenburg state; Grey background: Time of Nazi rule; Red background: Time of communist rule)

Gülitz-Reetz: Population development
within the current boundaries (2017)

Year	Pop.	±% p.a.
1875	1,276	—
1890	1,159	−0.64%
1910	1,078	−0.36%
1925	1,109	+0.19%
1933	990	−1.41%
1939	923	−1.16%
1946	1,522	+7.41%
1950	1,381	−2.40%
1964	927	−2.81%
1971	893	−0.53%
1981	655	−3.05%
1985	621	−1.32%
1989	651	+1.19%
1990	631	−3.07%

Year	Pop.	±% p.a.
1991	611	−3.17%
1992	610	−0.16%
1993	616	+0.98%
1994	612	−0.65%
1995	602	−1.63%
1996	580	−3.65%
1997	596	+2.76%
1998	612	+2.68%
1999	619	+1.14%
2000	613	−0.97%
2001	612	−0.16%
2002	596	−2.61%
2003	581	−2.52%
2004	579	−0.34%

Year	Pop.	±% p.a.
2005	565	−2.42%
2006	539	−4.60%
2007	523	−2.97%
2008	523	+0.00%
2009	512	−2.10%
2010	514	+0.39%
2011	475	−7.59%
2012	465	−2.11%
2013	481	+3.44%
2014	476	−1.04%
2015	479	+0.63%
2016	468	−2.30%
2017	461	−1.50%
