= Cumlosen =

- Municipality
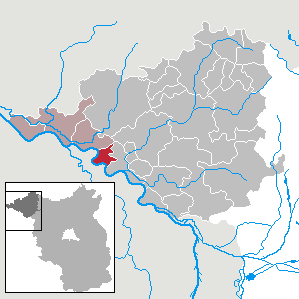
- Location of Cumlosen within Prignitz district
- Interactive map of Cumlosen
- Location within Germany Location within Brandenburg
- Coordinates: 53°01′59″N 11°40′00″E
- Country: Germany
- State: Brandenburg
- District: Prignitz
- Municipal assoc.: Lenzen-Elbtalaue
- Subdivisions: 3 Ortsteile

Government
  - Mayor (2024–29): Harald Pohle

Area
  - Total: 21.85 km^{2} (8.44 sq mi)
- Elevation: 20 m (66 ft)

Population (2025-12-31)
  - Total: 703
  - Density: 32.2/km^{2} (83.3/sq mi)
- Time zone: UTC+01:00 (CET)
  - Summer (DST): UTC+02:00 (CEST)
- Postal codes: 19322
- Dialling codes: 038794
- Vehicle registration: PR
- Website: www.cumlosen.de

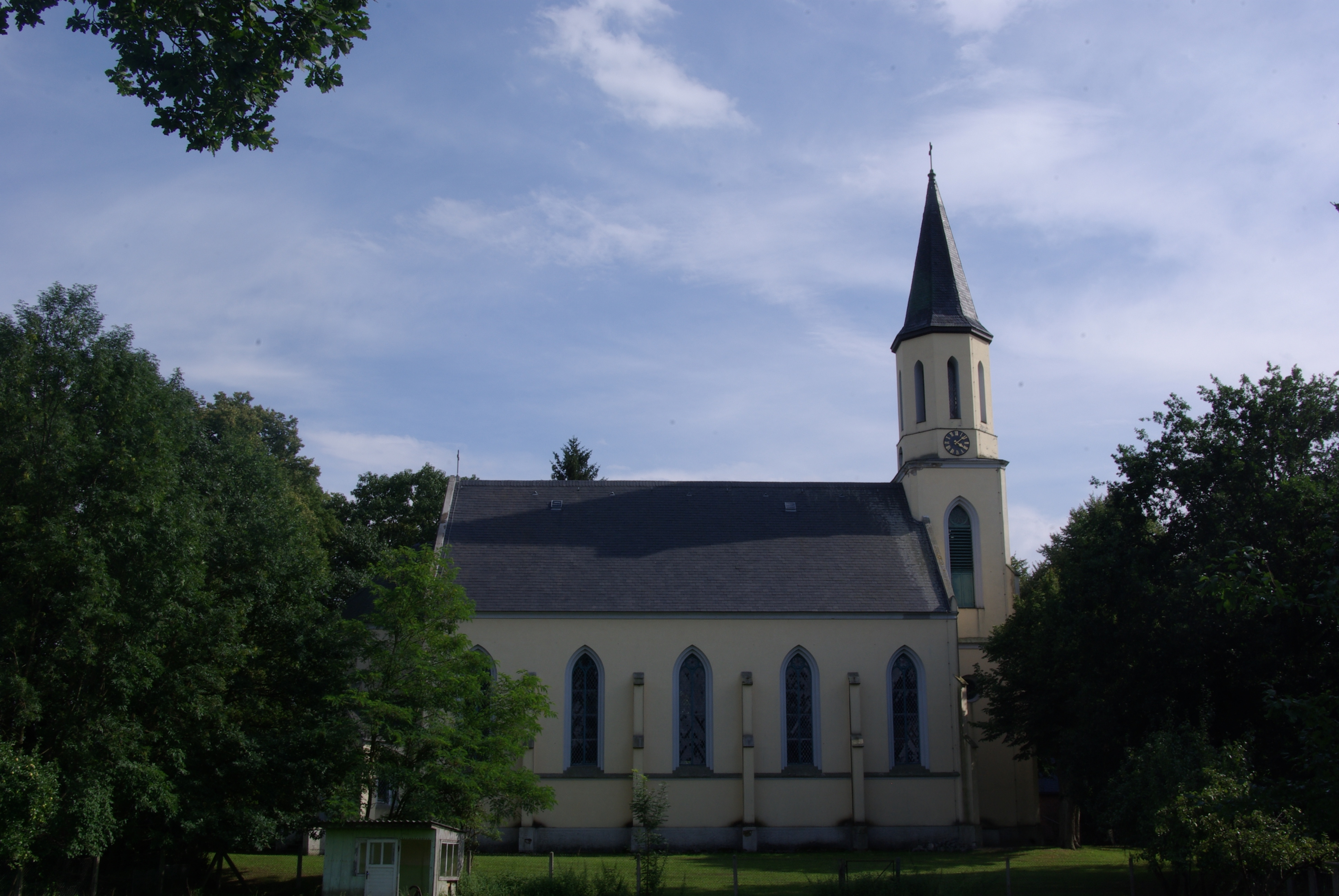
The church

Cumlosen is a municipality in the Prignitz district, in Brandenburg, Germany.

== History ==
Between 1945 and 1990 Cumlosen served as East German inner German border crossing for inland navigation on the Elbe. The crossing was open for freight vessels navigating between Czechoslovakia, the Soviet Zone of occupation in Germany (till 1949, thereafter the East German Democratic Republic, or West Berlin and the British zone of occupation (till 1949) and thereafter the West German Federal Republic of Germany. The traffic was subject to the Interzonal traffic regulations and that between West Germany and West Berlin was subject to the special regulations of the Transit Agreement (1972).

== Demography ==
Development of Population since 1875 within the Current Boundaries (Blue Line: Population; Dotted Line: Comparison to Population Development of Brandenburg state; Grey Background: Time of Nazi rule; Red Background: Time of Communist rule)

Cumlosen: Population development
within the current boundaries (2013)

Year	Pop.	±% p.a.
1875	1,292	—
1890	1,188	−0.56%
1910	1,178	−0.04%
1925	1,240	+0.34%
1933	1,235	−0.05%
1939	1,328	+1.22%
1946	1,779	+4.27%
1950	1,648	−1.89%
1964	1,048	−3.18%
1971	1,016	−0.44%
1981	859	−1.66%
1985	857	−0.06%
1989	855	−0.06%
1990	841	−1.64%
1991	845	+0.48%
1992	812	−3.91%
1993	815	+0.37%
1994	823	+0.98%
1995	834	+1.34%
1996	838	+0.48%

Year	Pop.	±% p.a.
1997	861	+2.74%
1998	880	+2.21%
1999	899	+2.16%
2000	905	+0.67%
2001	899	−0.66%
2002	892	−0.78%
2003	901	+1.01%
2004	897	−0.44%
2005	893	−0.45%
2006	886	−0.78%
2007	866	−2.26%
2008	856	−1.15%
2009	835	−2.45%
2010	809	−3.11%
2011	791	−2.22%
2012	787	−0.51%
2013	772	−1.91%
2014	757	−1.94%
2015	734	−3.04%
2016	723	−1.50%
