= Otto, Margrave of the Nordmark =

German noble (died 1057)

Otto
- Margrave of the Nordmark
- Tenure: 10 September 1056 – 26 June 1057
- Died: 26 June 1057; Hausneindorf, Duchy of Saxony
- Father: Bernard, Margrave of the Nordmark

Otto (c. 1040–26 June 1057) was a German 11th century noble. He was an illegitimate son of Bernard, Margrave of the Nordmark, and a Slav mistress whose name is unknown. He was exiled to Bohemia during his youth. Following the death of his half-brother William on 10 September 1056, Otto returned to Saxony to claim the Northern March. His claim, however, was contested by Lothair Udo I, and Otto was killed in battle near Hausneindorf on 26 June 1057. The Annales of Lambert of Hersfeld describe Otto as "adolescentem" at the time of his death, suggesting he was still quite young; his birth date is estimated to be around 1040.
