= Victor Berge =

Swedish diving pioneer and author

Victor Berge (1891–1974) was a pioneering diver of the early 20th century, raised in the Swedish town of Ockelbo, "a little village in the pine forests of Gestrickland" according to a description in Pearl Diver. After his father died at a young age, he eventually went to sea, where he spent the next forty years diving in the Pacific. Two books chronicle his life, Pearl Diver (1930), which covers his life up to 1930 or so, and Danger is My Life (1954), which chronicles his life up to that point, and through World War II (when he was captured and imprisoned by the Japanese). After the war he returned to Sweden, where he died in 1974 in Stockholm. In line with his instructions, he is buried in Ockelbo.

== Biographical works and materials ==

Pearl Diver: Adventuring Over and Under Southern Seas
Victor Berge and Henry Wysham Lanier (as told to)
Illustrations by Stephen Haweis
Hardcover, dustjacket, first published, 1930
352pp. Line drawings.
Garden City Publishing Company, Inc.
Garden City, New York

Co-author Henry Wysham Lanier had Berge describe his career as a diver and his adventures around the world, with a stenographer making a verbatim transcript, from which Lanier then wrote this account.

Danger Is My Life
Victor Berge
Translated from the Swedish by Mervyn Savill
Hardcover, dustjacket, first published, April 1954
184pp. Mono photographs.
Hutchinson, London

Covers his life in 'the South Seas' where he was later captured and brought to Java by the Japanese during the Pacific War. He invented and patented a full-face diving mask, (the Victor Berge mask), and 'one of the few men to have survived a fight with a giant squid' (see illustration on this page by Armstrong Sperry, from the August 1930 issue of St. Nicholas Magazine for Children (Volume 57, No. 10, p. 751), which accompanied the story, "The Terror of the Deep", co-authored by Victor Berge and Henry Wysham Lanier). One of the early classics of diving literature.

Also, according to the Swedish Historical Diving Society, the Summer 2004 edition of their magazine (Dykarledaren sommaren 2004) included a discussion of Victor Berge, and a VHS video tape discussing him is available.

== The Berge dive mask ==
Below, an early (c. 1940) Berge shallow dive mask. Manufactured by the Ohio Rubber Co, this version features a "free flow" regulator, as opposed to the converted aviation regulator seen on other examples.
