= Gans zu Putlitz =

German noble family

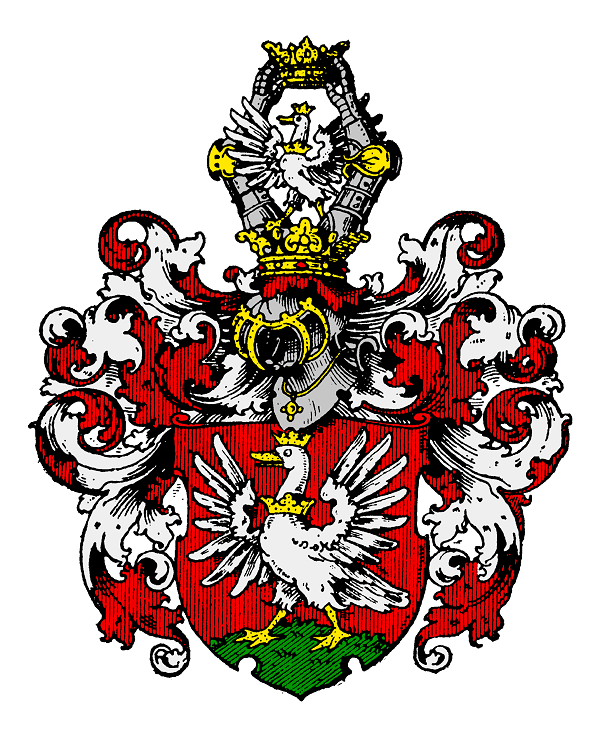
The coat of arms displaying a goose, the family symbol with Gans meaning goose.

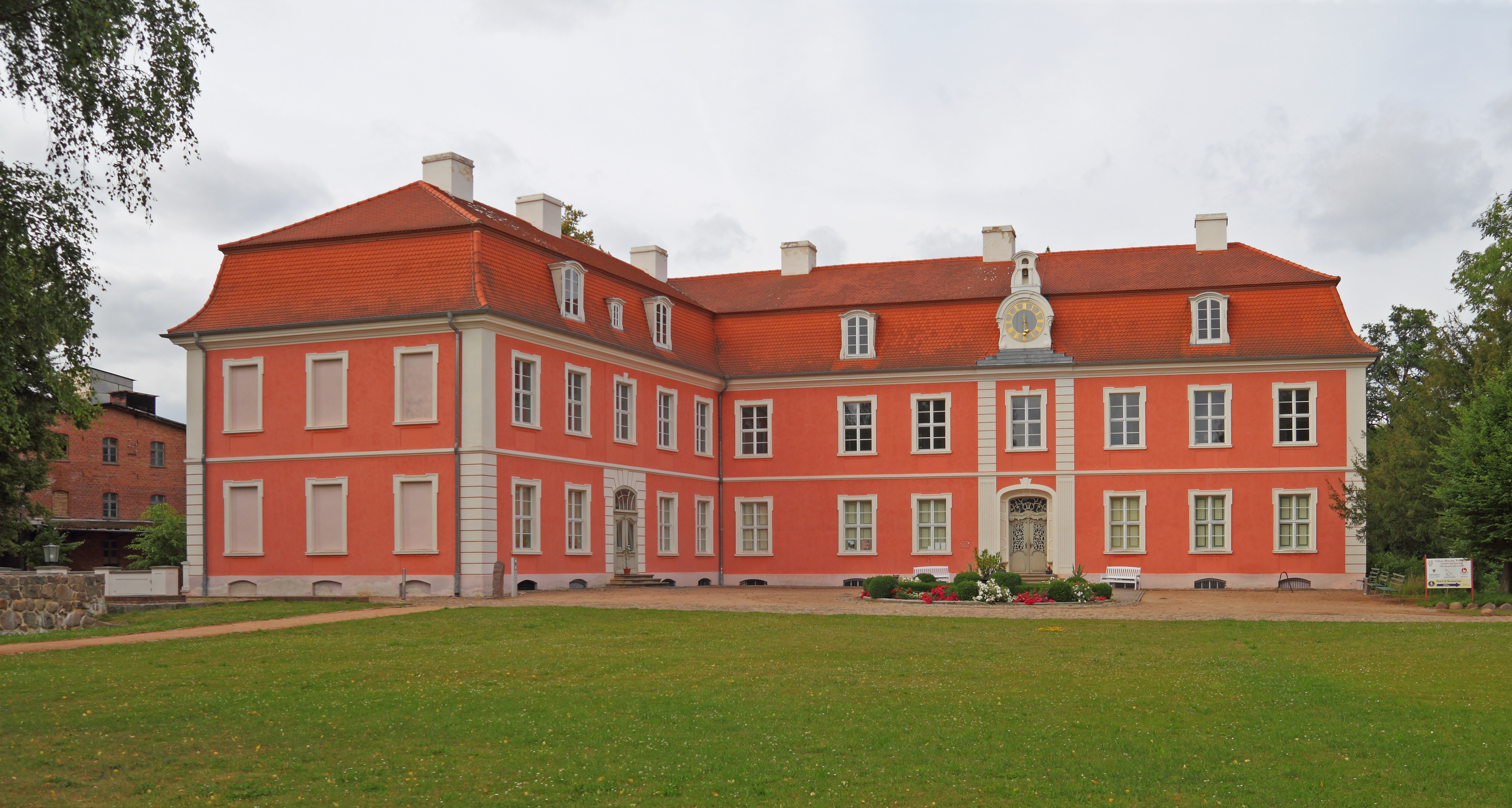
Wolfshagen Manor, until the Soviet expropriation in 1945 held by the family.

The Gans Edle Herren zu Putlitz (Edle Herren = noble lords, until 1919 a title, it became a part of the official surname with the transformation of most noble titles into surname elements to be ignored at alphanumerical sorting) is a German noble family belonging to the Uradel ('ancient nobility') of the March of Brandenburg, and was one of the most influential families in the Prignitz region, especially during the Middle Ages. The first documentary reference to the family appears in the reign of Emperor Frederick Barbarossa, in about 1178 with Johannes Gans, titled „baro“ (baron) in the text.

== See also ==
- Wolfgang Gans zu Putlitz

== Literature ==
- Redern, von, H.; Ragotsky, B.; Hildebrandt, Adolf Matthias (1887). Stammtafeln der Familie Gans Edle Herren zu Putlitz, von ihrem ersten urkundlichen Auftretenbis zur Gegenwart [Family Tree of the Gans Edle Herren zu Putlitz Family, from their First Appearance in Written Documents until Present.] (PDF/application) (in German). Berlin: Julius Sittenfeld. p. 27.
