= Putlitz =

- Town
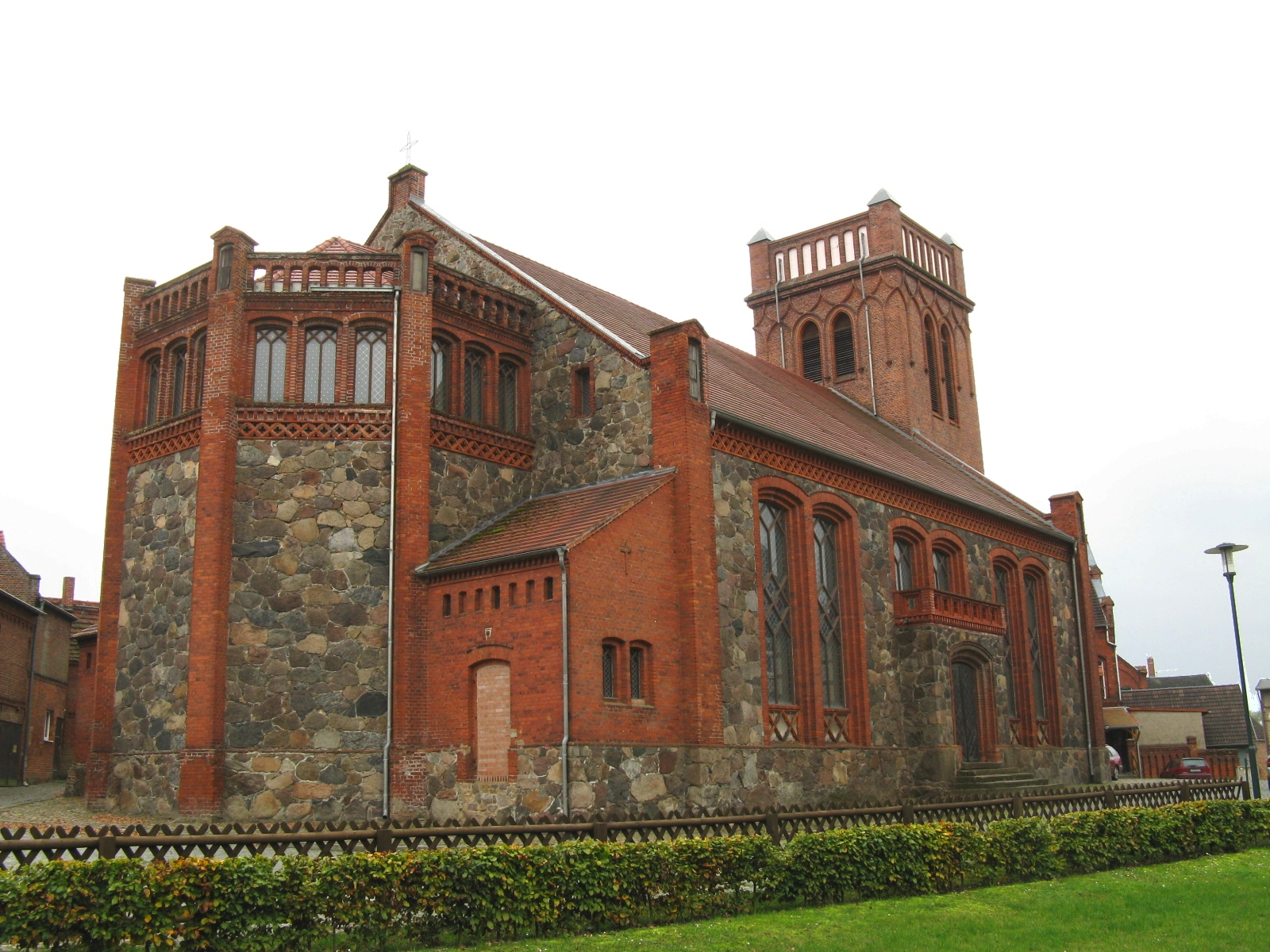
- Church

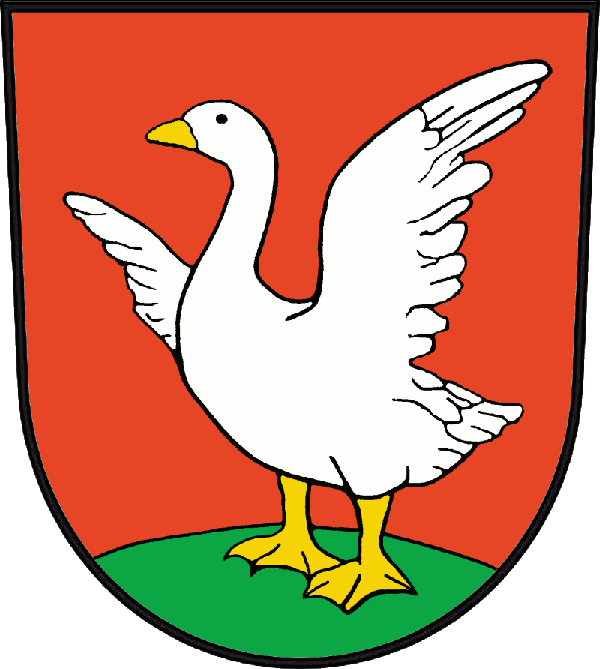
- Coat of arms

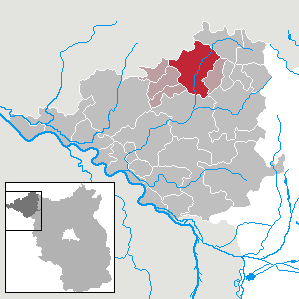
- Location of Putlitz within Prignitz district
- Interactive map of Putlitz
- Location within Germany Location within Brandenburg
- Coordinates: 53°15′N 12°03′E
- Country: Germany
- State: Brandenburg
- District: Prignitz
- Municipal assoc.: Putlitz-Berge
- Subdivisions: 13 Ortsteile

Government
  - Mayor (2024–29): Udo Burzyk (Ind.)

Area
  - Total: 119.68 km^{2} (46.21 sq mi)
- Elevation: 57 m (187 ft)

Population (2025-12-31)
  - Total: 2,533
  - Density: 21.16/km^{2} (54.82/sq mi)
- Time zone: UTC+01:00 (CET)
  - Summer (DST): UTC+02:00 (CEST)
- Postal codes: 16949
- Dialling codes: 033981
- Vehicle registration: PR
- Website: www.amtputlitz-berge.de

Putlitz (German pronunciation: [ˈpʊtlɪts]) is a town in the district of Prignitz, in Brandenburg, Germany. It is situated 15 km northwest of Pritzwalk, and 35 km northeast of Wittenberge. It is located on the Stepenitz River.

== History ==
From 1815 to 1945, Putlitz was part of the Prussian Province of Brandenburg. From 1952 to 1990, it was part of the Bezirk Potsdam of East Germany.

== Demography ==
Development of Population since 1875 within the Current Boundaries (Blue Line: Population; Dotted Line: Comparison to Population Development of Brandenburg state; Grey Background: Time of Nazi rule; Red Background: Time of Communist rule)

Putlitz: Population development
within the current boundaries (2013)

Year	Pop.	±% p.a.
1875	4,628	—
1890	4,291	−0.50%
1910	4,292	+0.00%
1925	4,493	+0.31%
1933	4,611	+0.32%
1939	4,308	−1.13%
1946	6,520	+6.10%
1950	6,391	−0.50%
1964	4,832	−1.98%
1971	4,760	−0.21%
1981	3,929	−1.90%
1985	3,753	−1.14%
1989	3,733	−0.13%
1990	3,694	−1.04%
1991	3,599	−2.57%
1992	3,532	−1.86%
1993	3,481	−1.44%
1994	3,470	−0.32%
1995	3,422	−1.38%
1996	3,405	−0.50%

Year	Pop.	±% p.a.
1997	3,332	−2.14%
1998	3,329	−0.09%
1999	3,329	+0.00%
2000	3,244	−2.55%
2001	3,209	−1.08%
2002	3,193	−0.50%
2003	3,147	−1.44%
2004	3,098	−1.56%
2005	3,068	−0.97%
2006	3,009	−1.92%
2007	2,973	−1.20%
2008	2,921	−1.75%
2009	2,850	−2.43%
2010	2,780	−2.46%
2011	2,761	−0.68%
2012	2,758	−0.11%
2013	2,730	−1.02%
2014	2,745	+0.55%
2015	2,737	−0.29%
2016	2,736	−0.04%

== Gallery ==
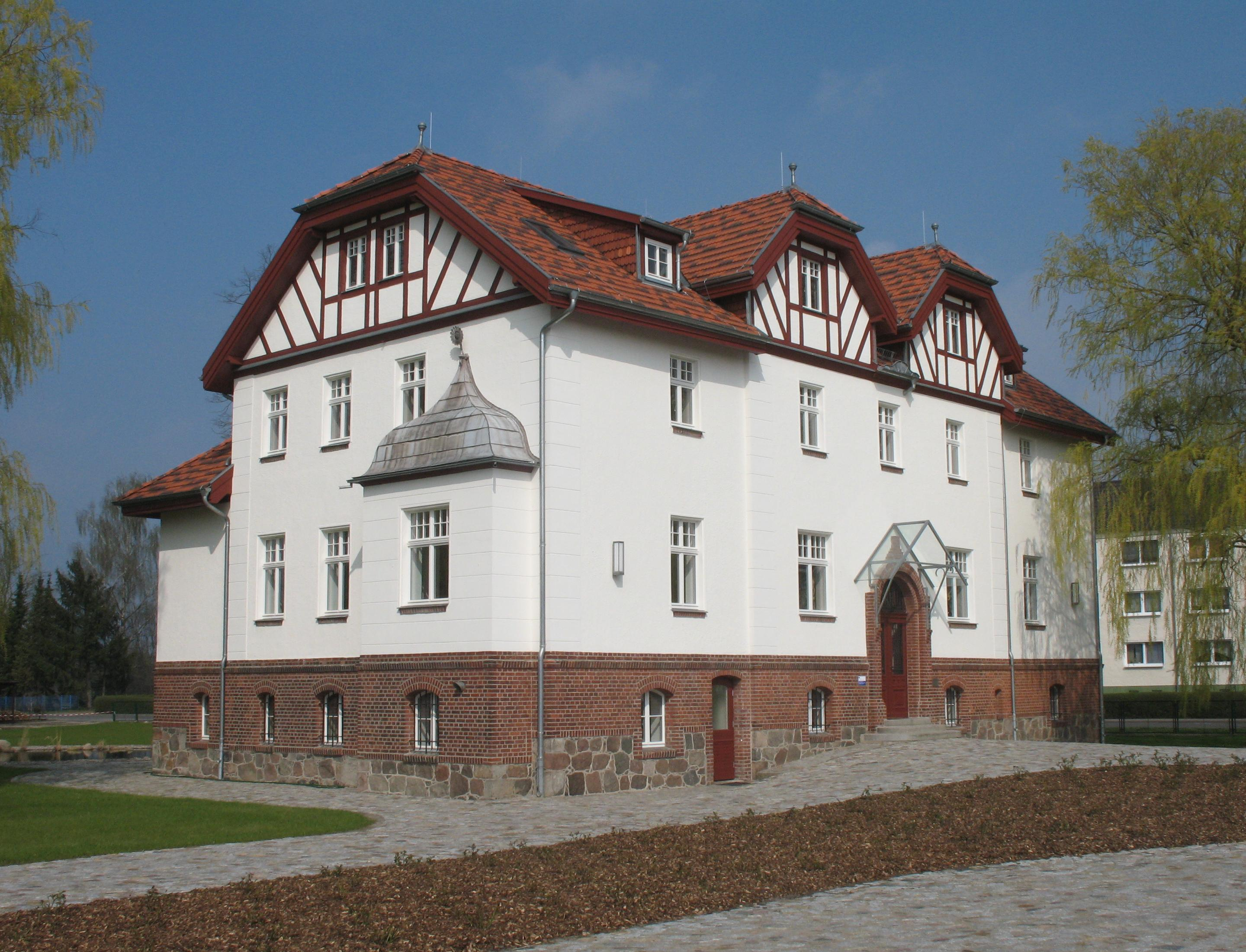
Burghof manor

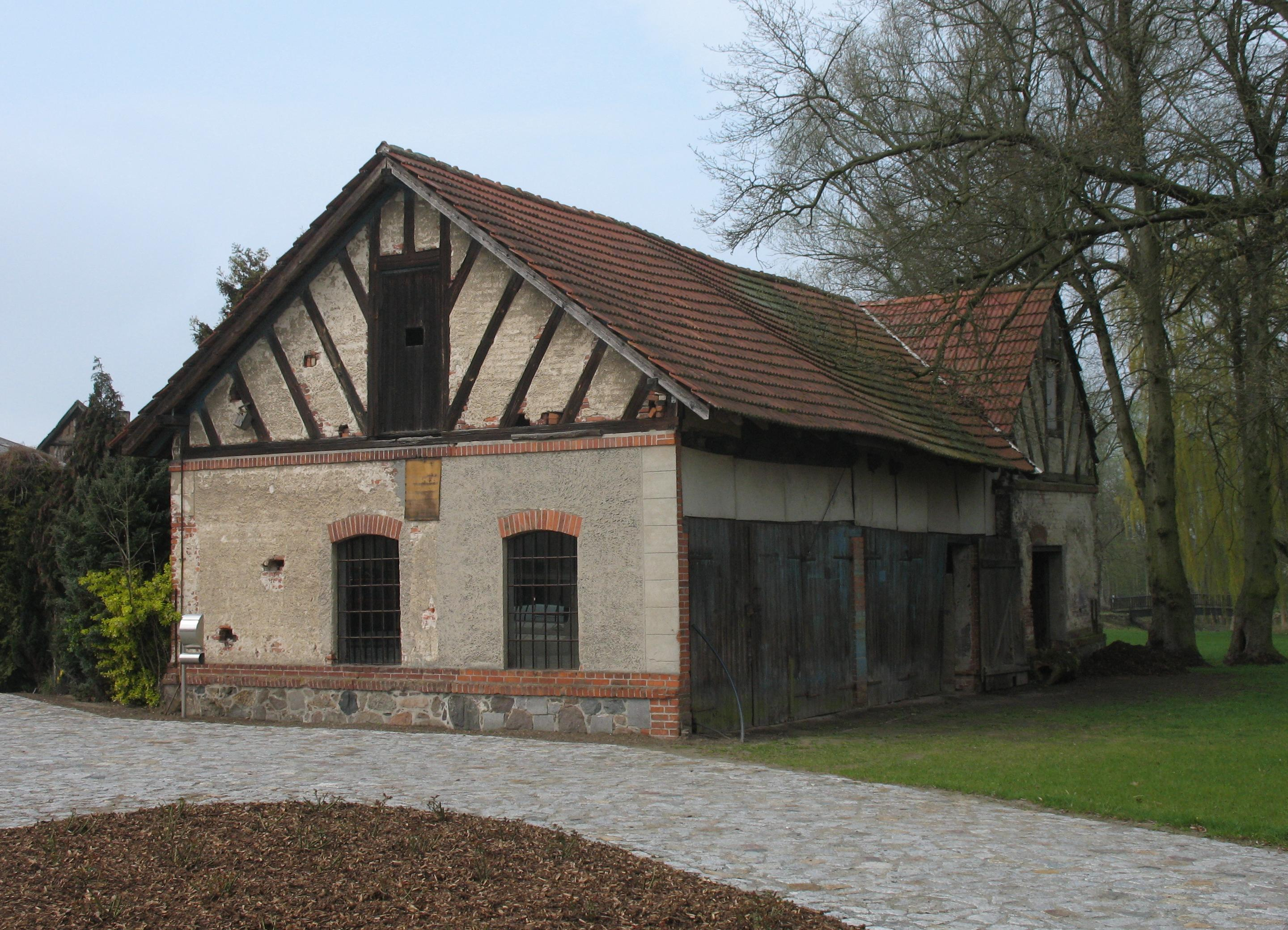
Burghof

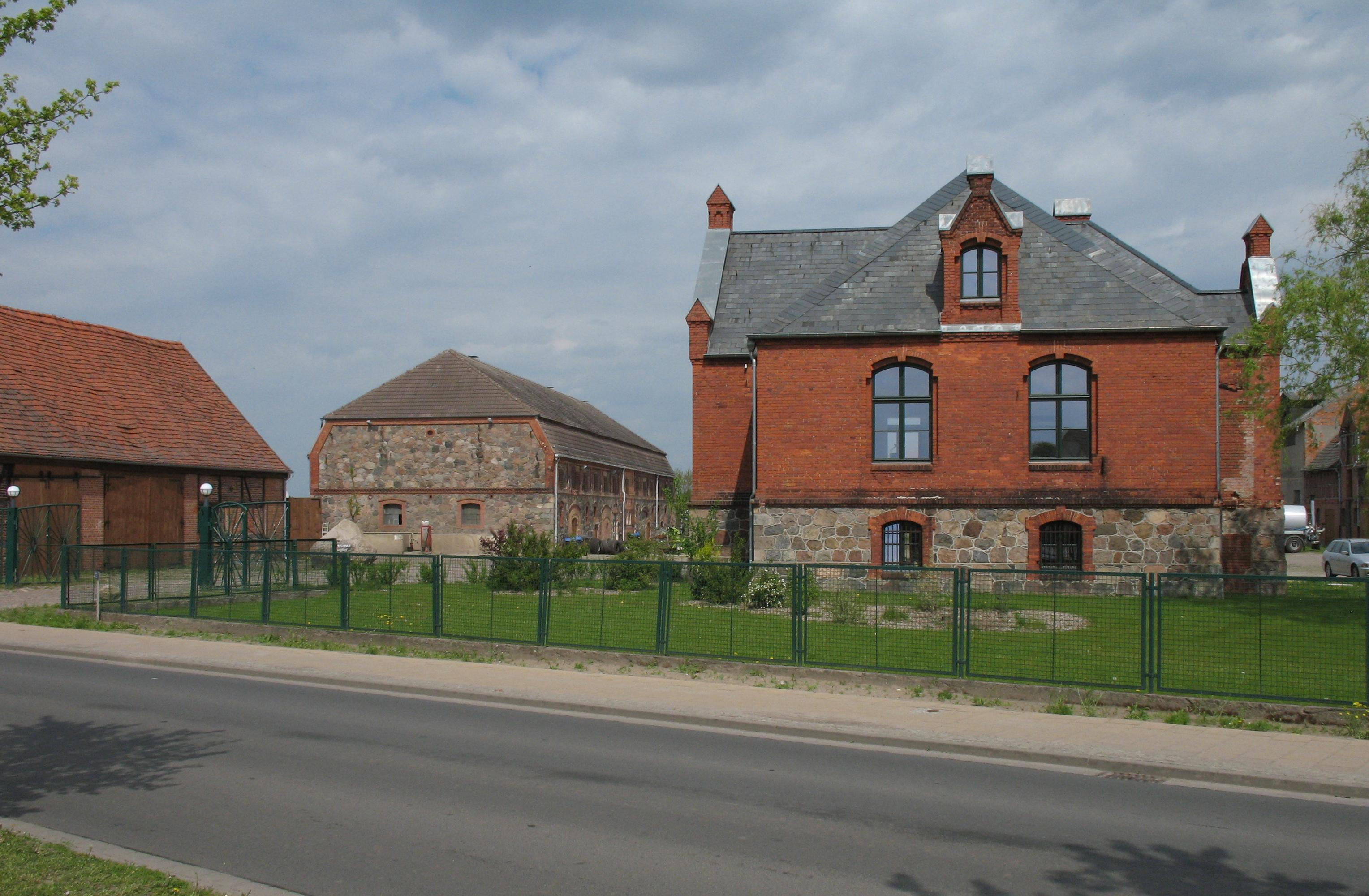

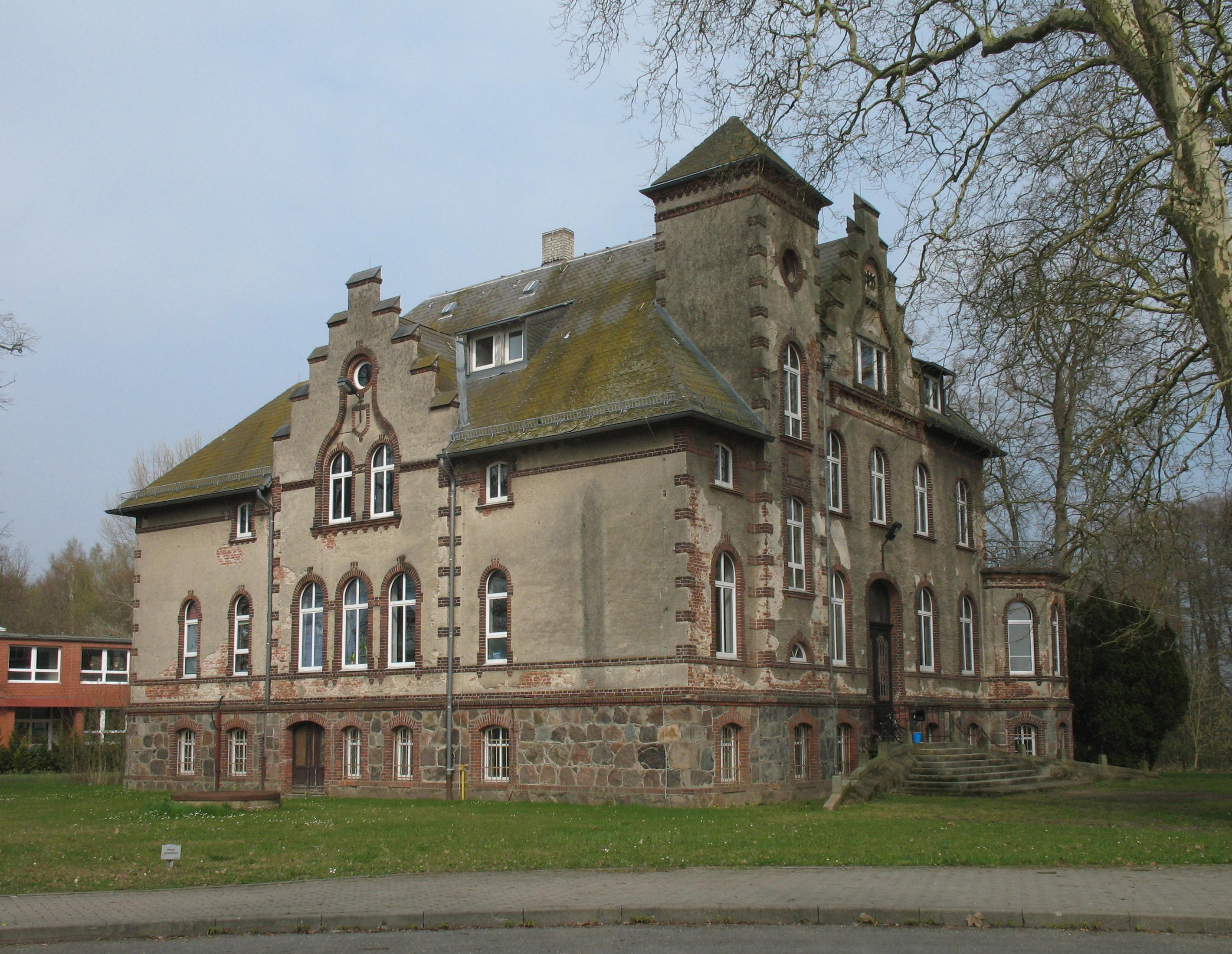
Philippshof manor

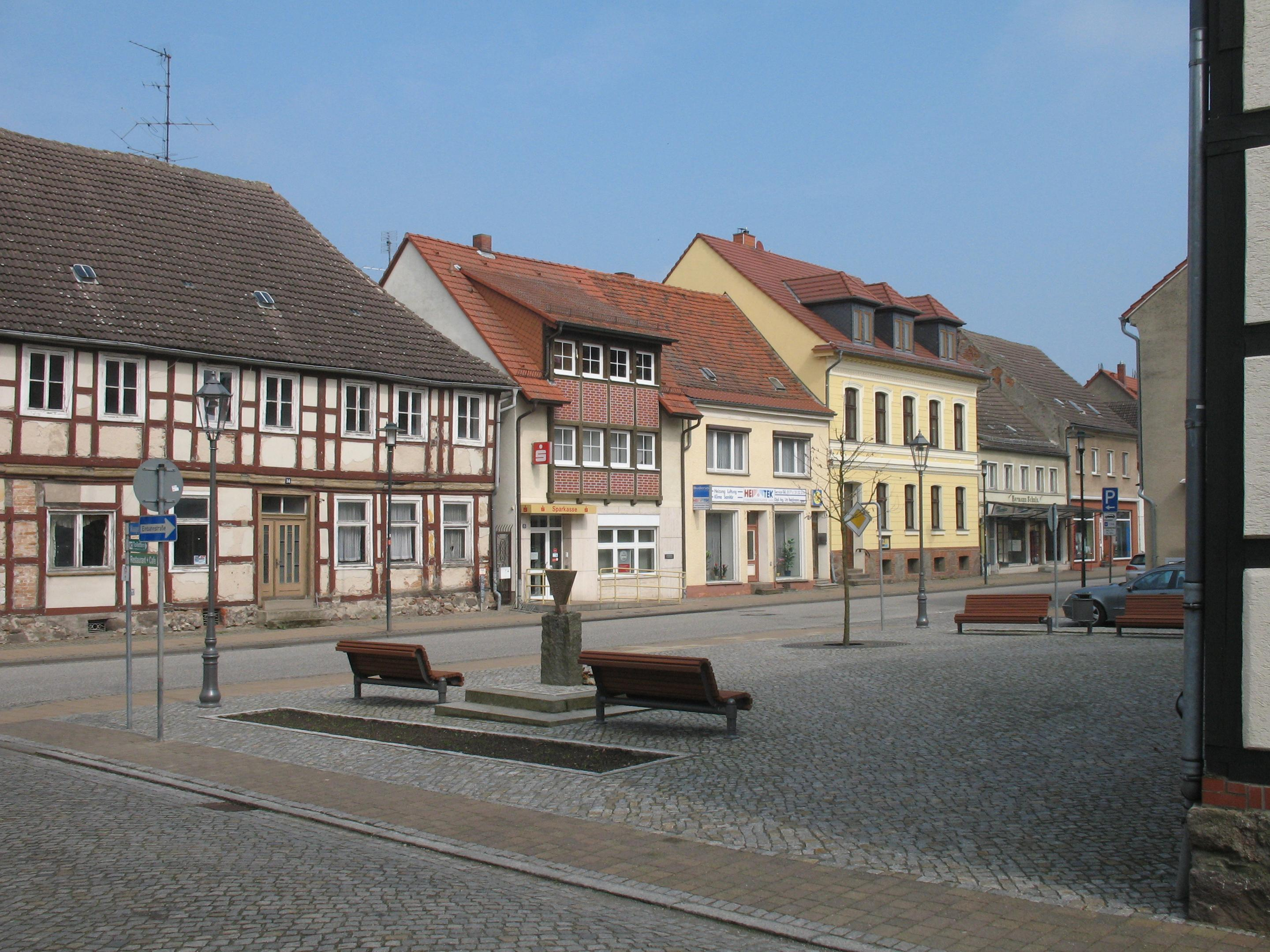
Town hall square

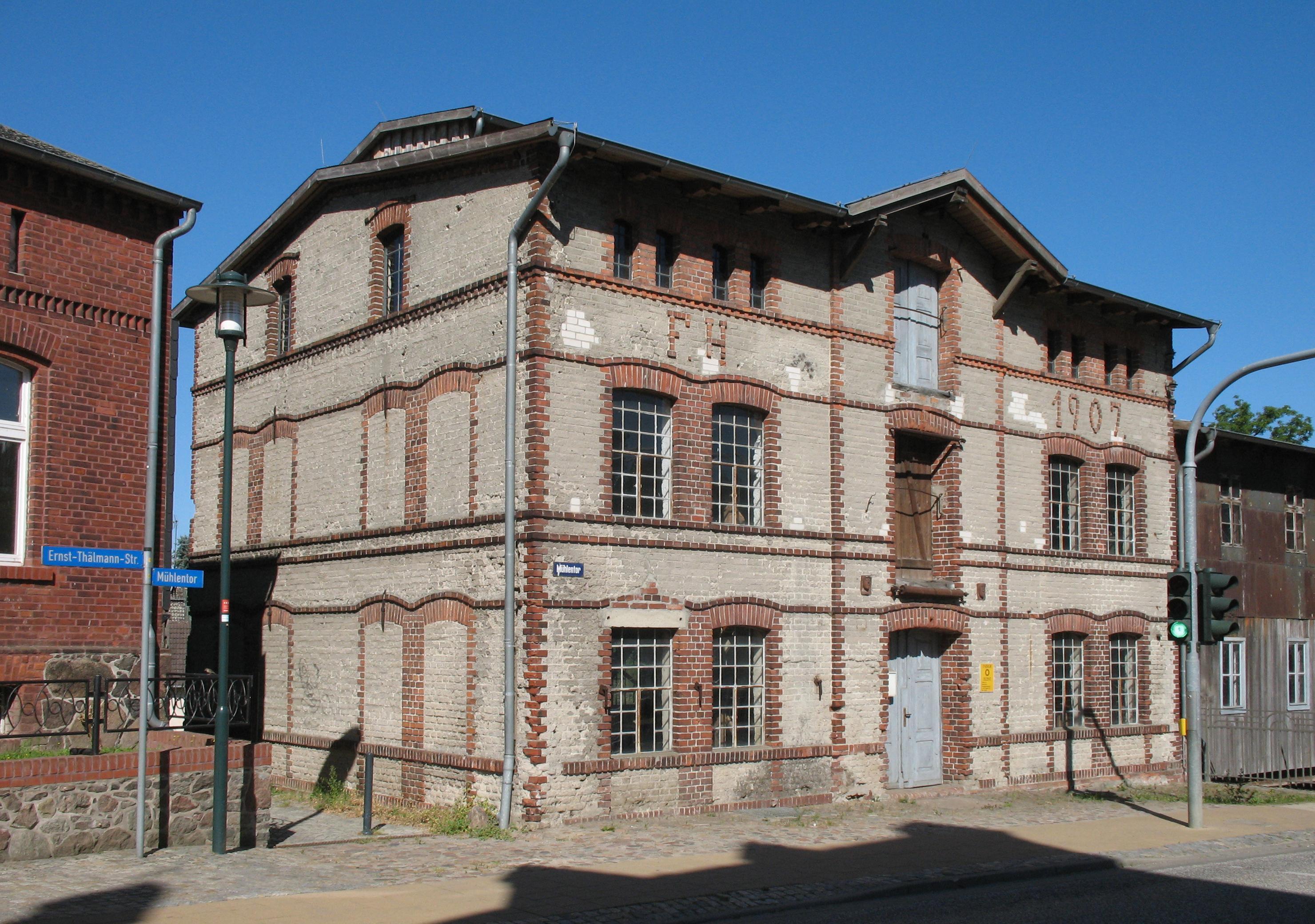
Watermill

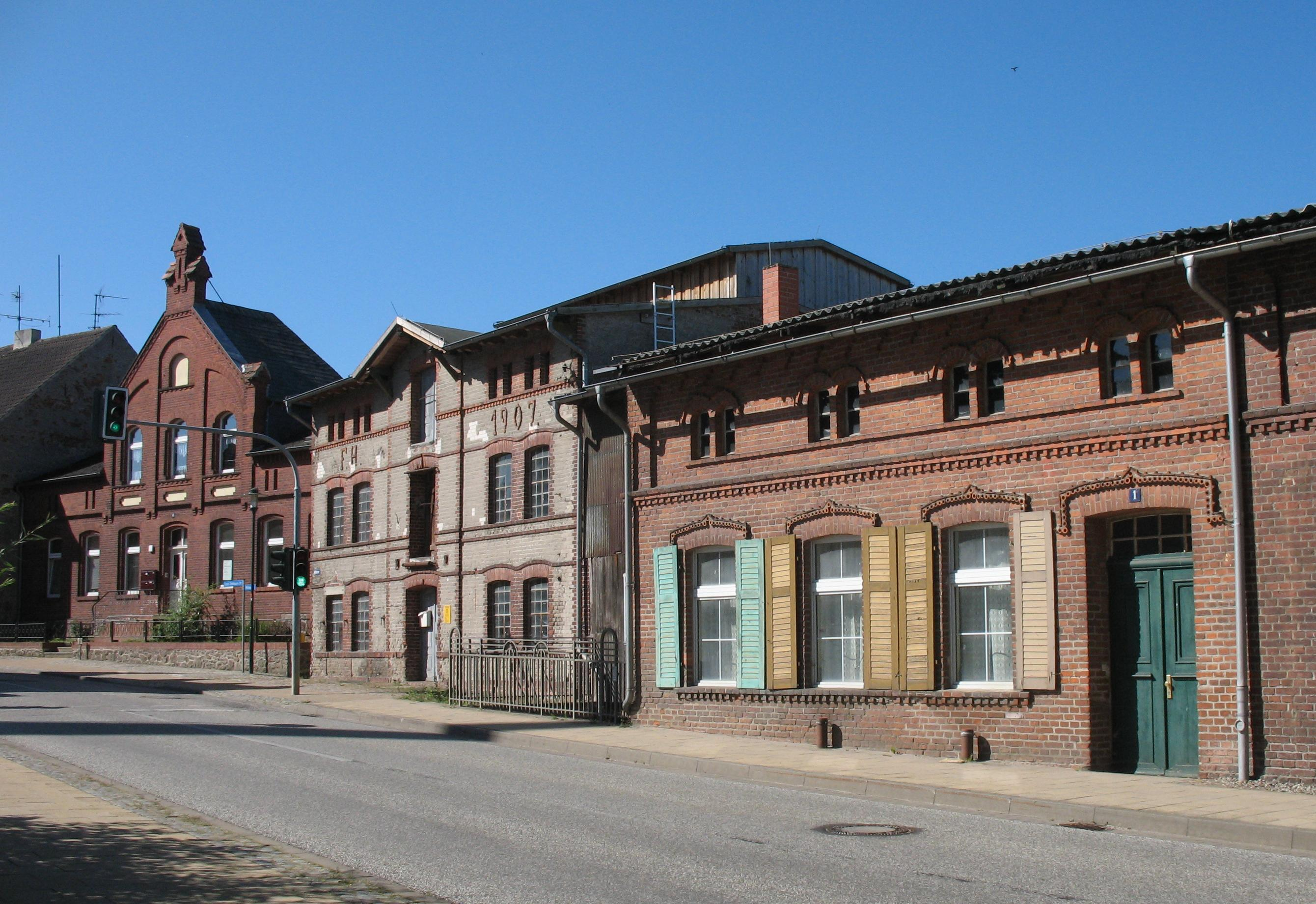

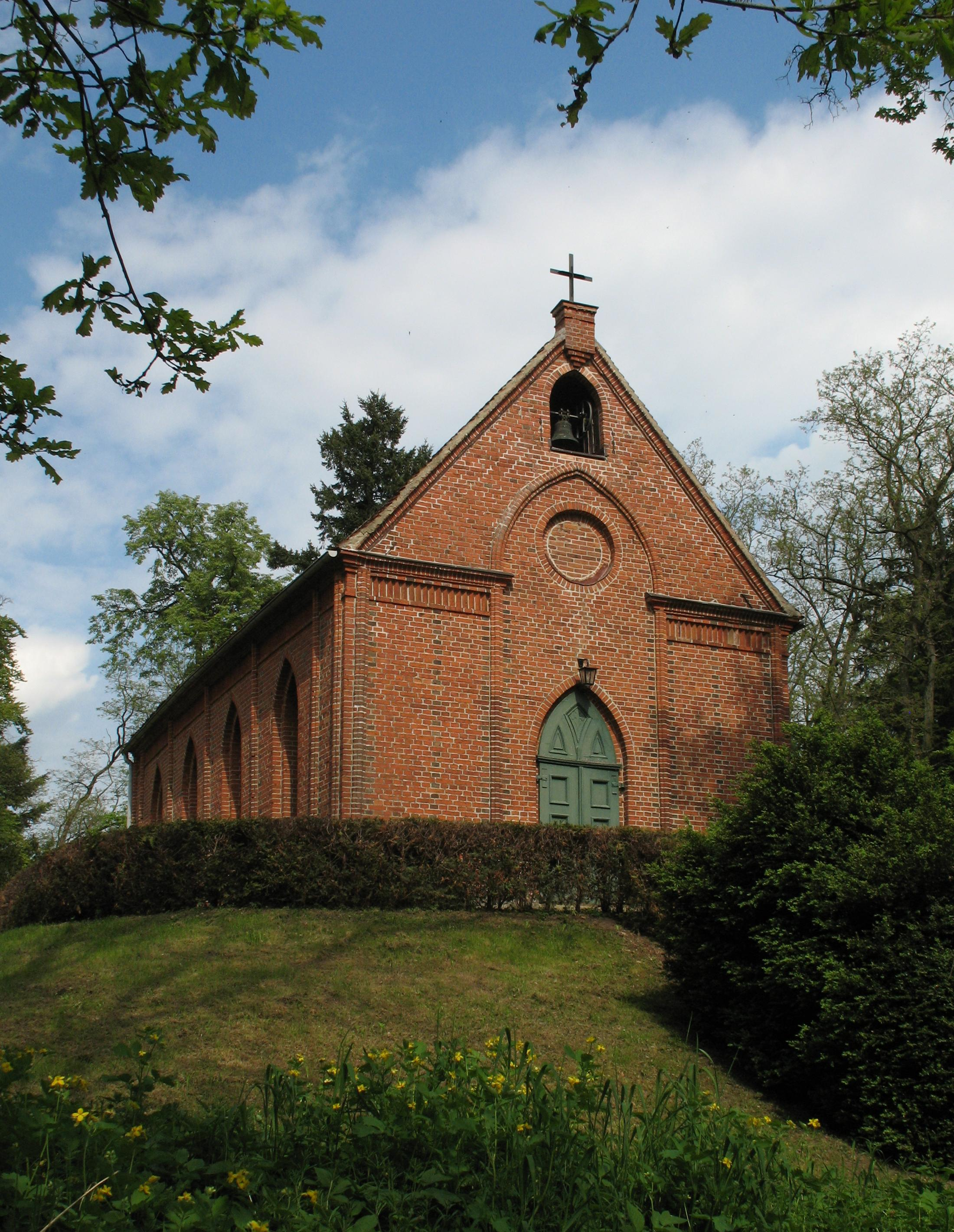
Church in Nettelbeck

== International relations ==
Putlitz is twinned with:

- Kaltenkirchen, Germany
