= Pirow, Brandenburg =

- Municipality
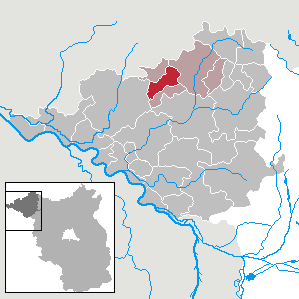
- Location of Pirow, Brandenburg within Prignitz district
- Interactive map of Pirow, Brandenburg
- Location within Germany Location within Brandenburg
- Coordinates: 53°13′00″N 11°54′00″E
- Country: Germany
- State: Brandenburg
- District: Prignitz
- Municipal assoc.: Putlitz-Berge

Government
  - Mayor (2024–29): Uwe Kessler

Area
  - Total: 37.45 km^{2} (14.46 sq mi)
- Elevation: 56 m (184 ft)

Population (2025-12-31)
  - Total: 425
  - Density: 11.3/km^{2} (29.4/sq mi)
- Time zone: UTC+01:00 (CET)
  - Summer (DST): UTC+02:00 (CEST)
- Postal codes: 19348
- Dialling codes: 038785
- Vehicle registration: PR

Pirow is a municipality in the Prignitz district, in Brandenburg, Germany.

== Demography ==
Development of population since 1875 within the current boundaries (Blue line: Population; Dotted line: Comparison to population development of Brandenburg state; Grey background: Time of Nazi rule; Red background: Time of communist rule)

Pirow: Population development
within the current boundaries (2013)

Year	Pop.	±% p.a.
1875	1,216	—
1890	1,126	−0.51%
1910	1,096	−0.13%
1925	1,148	+0.31%
1933	1,103	−0.50%
1939	1,018	−1.33%
1946	1,748	+8.03%
1950	1,572	−2.62%
1964	1,050	−2.84%
1971	990	−0.84%
1981	788	−2.26%
1985	716	−2.37%
1989	682	−1.21%
1990	670	−1.76%
1991	666	−0.60%
1992	656	−1.50%
1993	648	−1.22%
1994	642	−0.93%
1995	613	−4.52%
1996	604	−1.47%

Year	Pop.	±% p.a.
1997	576	−4.64%
1998	581	+0.87%
1999	564	−2.93%
2000	552	−2.13%
2001	546	−1.09%
2002	545	−0.18%
2003	536	−1.65%
2004	525	−2.05%
2005	519	−1.14%
2006	519	+0.00%
2007	496	−4.43%
2008	488	−1.61%
2009	484	−0.82%
2010	478	−1.24%
2011	476	−0.42%
2012	470	−1.26%
2013	453	−3.62%
2014	462	+1.99%
2015	460	−0.43%
2016	452	−1.74%
