= Marienfließ =

- Municipality
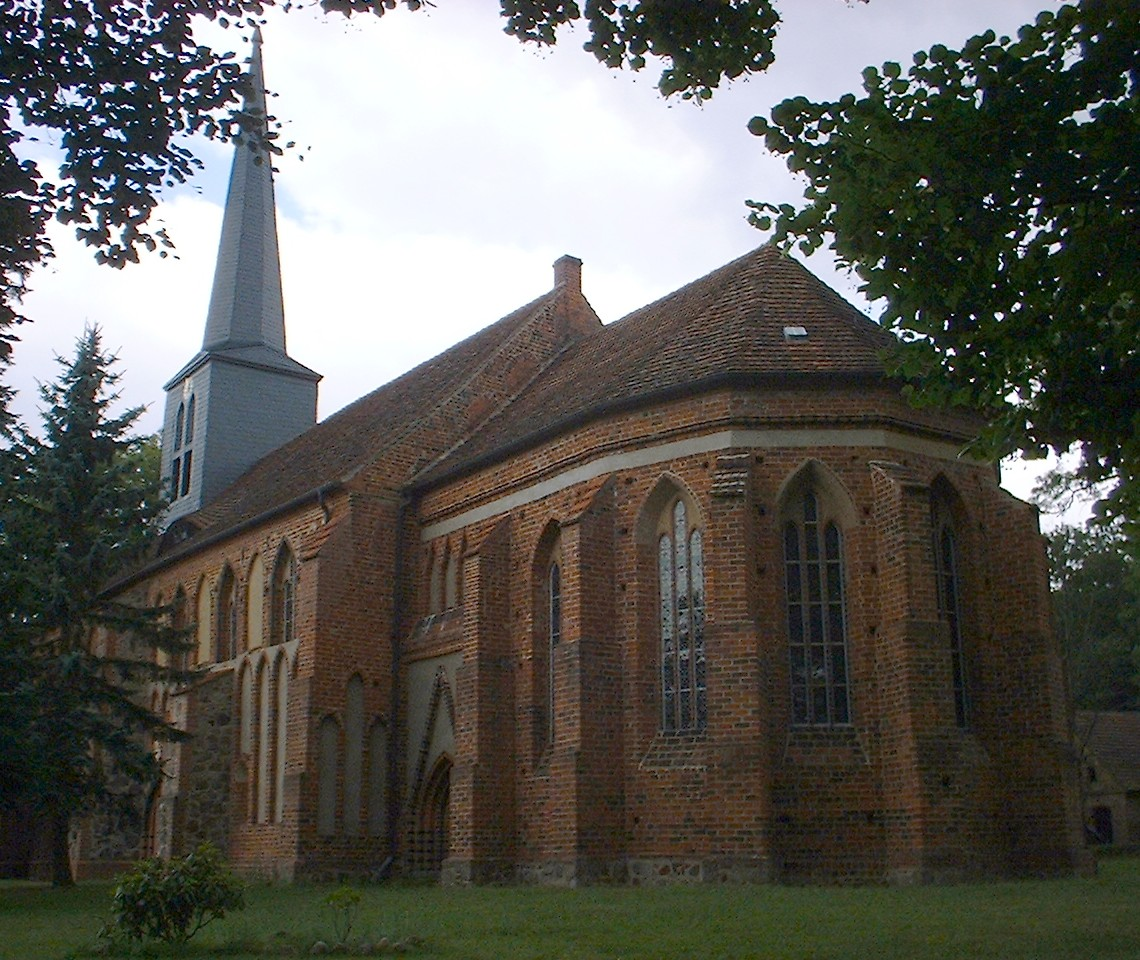
- Ss. Mary and Mary Magdalene Church, formerly Abbey of the Marienfließ Convent

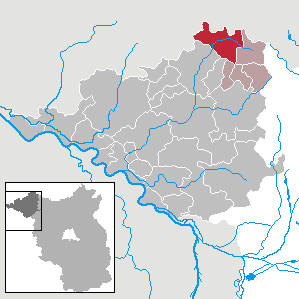
- Location of Marienfließ within Prignitz district
- Interactive map of Marienfließ
- Location within Germany Location within Brandenburg
- Coordinates: 53°19′00″N 12°09′00″E
- Country: Germany
- State: Brandenburg
- District: Prignitz
- Municipal assoc.: Meyenburg

Government
  - Mayor (2024–29): Burkhard Freese

Area
  - Total: 76.89 km^{2} (29.69 sq mi)
- Elevation: 68 m (223 ft)

Population (2025-12-31)
  - Total: 675
  - Density: 8.78/km^{2} (22.7/sq mi)
- Time zone: UTC+01:00 (CET)
  - Summer (DST): UTC+02:00 (CEST)
- Postal codes: 16945, 16949
- Dialling codes: 033968, 033969
- Vehicle registration: PR
- Website: www.amtmeyenburg.de

Marienfließ is a municipality in the Prignitz district, in Brandenburg, in north-eastern Germany. It is located on the banks of the Stepenitz River.

== History ==
During the final stages of World War II, on 7 March 1945, Frehne (now part of the municipality) was the site of a stopover during the German-organised march of French prisoners of war from the Oflag II-B camp headed westwards.

== Demography ==
Development of Population since 1875 within the Current Boundaries (Blue Line: Population; Dotted Line: Comparison to Population Development of Brandenburg state; Grey Background: Time of Nazi rule; Red Background: Time of Communist rule)

Marienfließ: Population development
within the current boundaries (2013)

Year	Pop.	±% p.a.
1875	1,506	—
1890	1,377	−0.60%
1910	1,453	+0.27%
1925	1,494	+0.19%
1933	1,381	−0.98%
1939	1,273	−1.35%
1946	2,049	+7.04%
1950	1,955	−1.17%
1964	1,402	−2.35%
1971	1,336	−0.69%
1981	1,010	−2.76%
1985	991	−0.47%
1989	1,001	+0.25%
1990	1,003	+0.20%

Year	Pop.	±% p.a.
1991	986	−1.69%
1992	989	+0.30%
1993	973	−1.62%
1994	998	+2.57%
1995	981	−1.70%
1996	1,006	+2.55%
1997	990	−1.59%
1998	973	−1.72%
1999	949	−2.47%
2000	958	+0.95%
2001	962	+0.42%
2002	932	−3.12%
2003	939	+0.75%
2004	901	−4.05%

Year	Pop.	±% p.a.
2005	886	−1.66%
2006	853	−3.72%
2007	815	−4.45%
2008	803	−1.47%
2009	795	−1.00%
2010	768	−3.40%
2011	767	−0.13%
2012	753	−1.83%
2013	713	−5.31%
2014	716	+0.42%
2015	712	−0.56%
2016	693	−2.67%
