= Breese, Germany =

Breese
- Municipality
- Flag Coat of arms

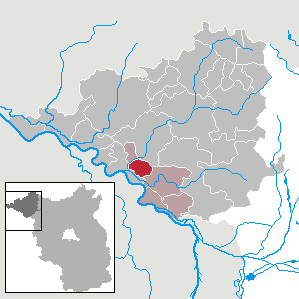
- Location of Breese within Prignitz district
- Interactive map of Breese
- Location within Germany Location within Brandenburg
- Coordinates: 53°00′N 11°48′E
- Country: Germany
- State: Brandenburg
- District: Prignitz
- Municipal assoc.: Bad Wilsnack/Weisen
- Subdivisions: 2 Ortsteile

Government
  - Mayor (2024–29): Fabien Wiesemann

Area
  - Total: 6.31 km^{2} (2.44 sq mi)
- Elevation: 25 m (82 ft)

Population (2025-12-31)
  - Total: 1,499
  - Density: 238/km^{2} (615/sq mi)
- Time zone: UTC+01:00 (CET)
  - Summer (DST): UTC+02:00 (CEST)
- Postal codes: 19322
- Dialling codes: 03877 + 038791
- Vehicle registration: PR
- Website: amt-badwilsnack-weisen.de

Breese is a municipality in the Prignitz district, in Brandenburg, Germany.

== Demography ==
Development of Population since 1875 within the Current Boundaries (Blue Line: Population; Dotted Line: Comparison to Population Development of Brandenburg state; Grey Background: Time of Nazi rule; Red Background: Time of Communist rule)

Breese: Population development
within the current boundaries (2013)

Year	Pop.	±% p.a.
1875	803	—
1890	781	−0.19%
1910	943	+0.95%
1925	1,142	+1.28%
1933	1,392	+2.51%
1939	1,838	+4.74%
1946	2,314	+3.34%
1950	2,269	−0.49%
1964	1,953	−1.07%
1971	1,905	−0.35%
1981	1,601	−1.72%
1985	1,562	−0.61%
1989	1,522	−0.65%
1990	1,472	−3.29%
1991	1,420	−3.53%
1992	1,398	−1.55%
1993	1,405	+0.50%
1994	1,403	−0.14%
1995	1,466	+4.49%
1996	1,490	+1.64%

Year	Pop.	±% p.a.
1997	1,551	+4.09%
1998	1,569	+1.16%
1999	1,653	+5.35%
2000	1,699	+2.78%
2001	1,713	+0.82%
2002	1,678	−2.04%
2003	1,691	+0.77%
2004	1,671	−1.18%
2005	1,655	−0.96%
2006	1,624	−1.87%
2007	1,622	−0.12%
2008	1,603	−1.17%
2009	1,594	−0.56%
2010	1,560	−2.13%
2011	1,482	−5.00%
2012	1,473	−0.61%
2013	1,456	−1.15%
2014	1,447	−0.62%
2015	1,481	+2.35%
2016	1,470	−0.74%
