= Gumtow =

- Municipality
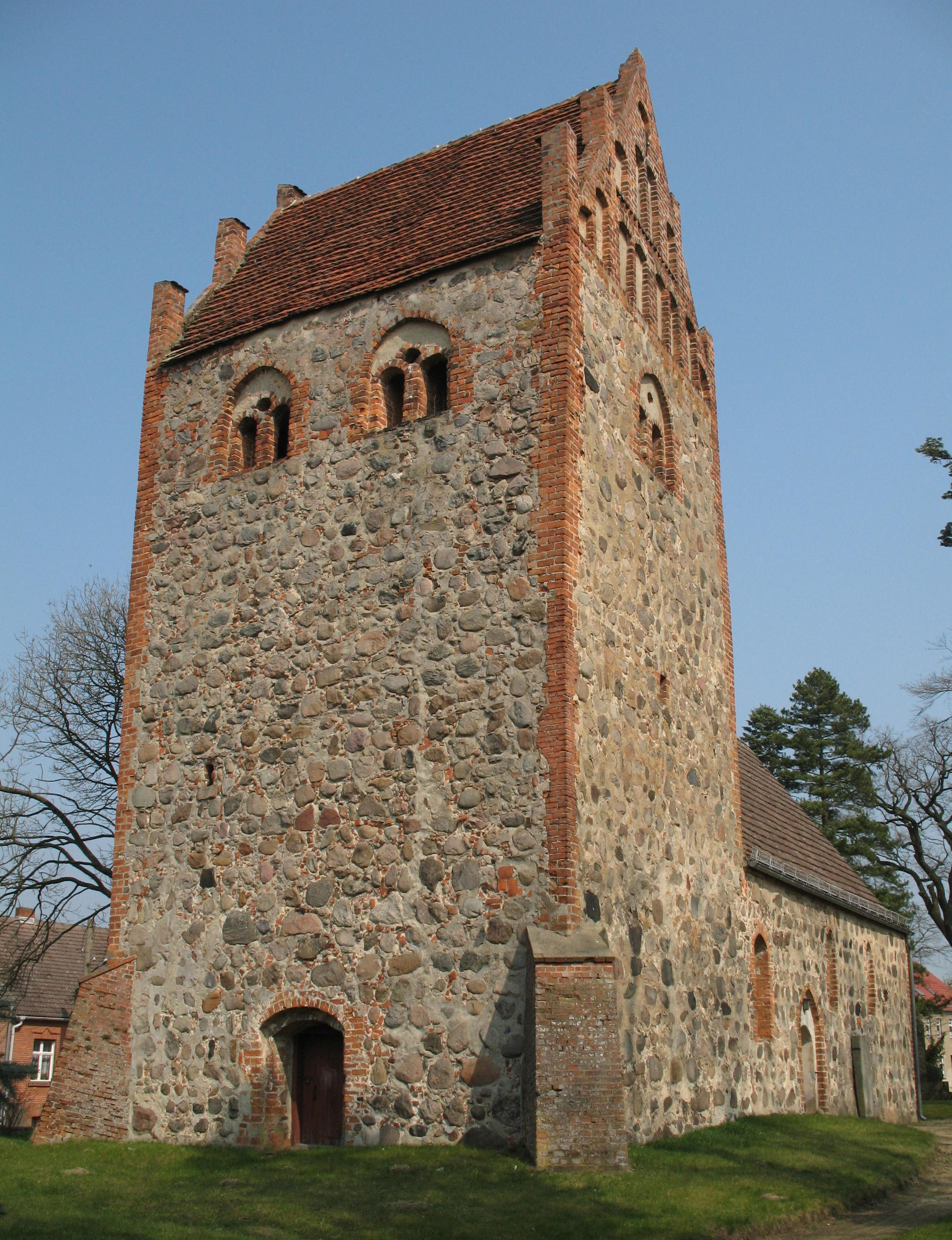
- Church in Vehlow

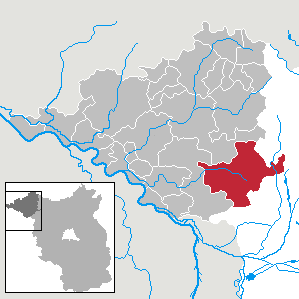
- Location of Gumtow within Prignitz district
- Interactive map of Gumtow
- Location within Germany Location within Brandenburg
- Coordinates: 52°58′59″N 12°15′00″E
- Country: Germany
- State: Brandenburg
- District: Prignitz
- Subdivisions: 16 Ortsteile

Government
  - Mayor (2024–32): Oliver Nitschke

Area
  - Total: 211.66 km^{2} (81.72 sq mi)
- Elevation: 61 m (200 ft)

Population (2025-12-31)
  - Total: 3,189
  - Density: 15.07/km^{2} (39.02/sq mi)
- Time zone: UTC+01:00 (CET)
  - Summer (DST): UTC+02:00 (CEST)
- Postal codes: 16866
- Dialling codes: 033977
- Vehicle registration: PR
- Website: www.gemeinde-gumtow.de

Gumtow is a municipality in the Prignitz district, in Brandenburg, Germany.

== Demography ==
Development of population since 1875 within the current Boundaries (Blue Line: Population; Dotted Line: Comparison to Population development in Brandenburg state; Grey Background: Time of Nazi Germany; Red Background: Time of communist East Germany)

Recent Population Development and Projections (Population Development before Census 2011 (blue line); Recent Population Development according to the Census in Germany in 2011 (blue bordered line); Official projections for 2005-2030 (yellow line); for 2017-2030 (scarlet line); for 2020-2030 (green line)

Gumtow: Population development
within the current boundaries (2020)

Year	Pop.	±% p.a.
1875	7,023	—
1890	6,822	−0.19%
1910	6,741	−0.06%
1925	6,731	−0.01%
1939	6,117	−0.68%
1950	9,754	+4.33%
1964	6,921	−2.42%

Year	Pop.	±% p.a.
1971	6,421	−1.07%
1981	4,990	−2.49%
1985	4,884	−0.54%
1990	4,712	−0.71%
1995	4,449	−1.14%
2000	4,344	−0.48%
2005	3,996	−1.66%

Year	Pop.	±% p.a.
2010	3,668	−1.70%
2015	3,438	−1.29%
2016	3,404	−0.99%
2017	3,370	−1.00%
2018	3,338	−0.95%
2019	3,327	−0.33%
2020	3,312	−0.45%
