= Berge (Brandenburg) =

- Municipality
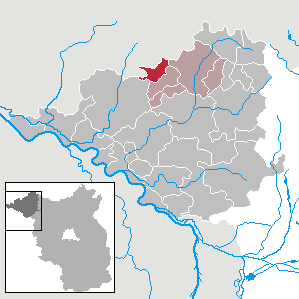
- Location of Berge within Prignitz district
- Interactive map of Berge
- Location within Germany Location within Brandenburg
- Coordinates: 53°13′59″N 11°52′00″E
- Country: Germany
- State: Brandenburg
- District: Prignitz
- Municipal assoc.: Putlitz-Berge
- Subdivisions: 4 Ortsteile

Government
  - Mayor (2024–29): Susanne Scherfke-Weber

Area
  - Total: 26.62 km^{2} (10.28 sq mi)
- Elevation: 57 m (187 ft)

Population (2025-12-31)
  - Total: 707
  - Density: 26.6/km^{2} (68.8/sq mi)
- Time zone: UTC+01:00 (CET)
  - Summer (DST): UTC+02:00 (CEST)
- Postal codes: 19348
- Dialling codes: 038785
- Vehicle registration: PR

Berge (German pronunciation: [ˈbɛʁɡə]) is a municipality in the Prignitz district, in Brandenburg, Germany.

== Demography ==
Development of Population since 1875 within the Current Boundaries (Blue Line: Population; Dotted Line: Comparison to Population Development of Brandenburg state; Grey Background: Time of Nazi rule; Red Background: Time of Communist rule)

Berge [Prignitz]: Population development
within the current boundaries (2013)

Year	Pop.	±% p.a.
1875	897	—
1890	879	−0.14%
1910	963	+0.46%
1925	958	−0.03%
1933	963	+0.07%
1939	974	+0.19%
1946	1,760	+8.82%
1950	1,606	−2.26%
1964	1,368	−1.14%
1971	1,349	−0.20%
1981	1,203	−1.14%
1985	1,154	−1.03%
1989	1,090	−1.42%
1990	1,081	−0.83%
1991	1,048	−3.05%
1992	1,021	−2.58%
1993	1,004	−1.67%
1994	1,017	+1.29%
1995	1,002	−1.47%
1996	998	−0.40%

Year	Pop.	±% p.a.
1997	1,005	+0.70%
1998	992	−1.29%
1999	993	+0.10%
2000	1,004	+1.11%
2001	969	−3.49%
2002	951	−1.86%
2003	947	−0.42%
2004	917	−3.17%
2005	899	−1.96%
2006	871	−3.11%
2007	856	−1.72%
2008	827	−3.39%
2009	807	−2.42%
2010	793	−1.73%
2011	784	−1.13%
2012	767	−2.17%
2013	770	+0.39%
2014	760	−1.30%
2015	770	+1.32%
2016	771	+0.13%
