= Prignitz =

Coordinates: 53°00′N 12°00′E

- District
- Flag Coat of arms
- Country: Germany
- State: Brandenburg
- Founded: 1993
- Capital: Perleberg

Government
  - District admin.: Christian Müller (SPD)

Area
  - Total: 2,123 km^{2} (820 sq mi)

Population (31 December 2025)
  - Total: 74,942
  - Density: 35.30/km^{2} (91.43/sq mi)
- Time zone: UTC+01:00 (CET)
  - Summer (DST): UTC+02:00 (CEST)
- Vehicle registration: PR
- Website: landkreis-prignitz.de

Prignitz (German: [ˈpʁiːɡnɪts]) is a Kreis (district) in northwestern Brandenburg, in northeastern Germany. Neighboring districts, clockwise from the north, are Ludwigslust-Parchim (in Mecklenburg-Western Pomerania), Ostprignitz-Ruppin (Brandenburg), Stendal (Saxony-Anhalt), and Lüchow-Dannenberg (Lower Saxony).

== Geography ==
The term Prignitz originally meant the region north of the confluence of the Elbe and Havel rivers. This region is larger than the district. It also includes the town of Havelberg in Saxony-Anhalt and large portions of the neighbouring district of Ostprignitz-Ruppin.

The Elbe river forms the southwestern border of the district.

== History ==
The historical region Prignitz consisted of the following eleven districts, established in the 13th century: Wittenberge, Lenzen, Perleberg, Putlitz, Kyritz, Nitzow, Wittstock, Pritzwalk, Havelberg, Wusterhausen and Grabow.

The present district of Prignitz was created in 1993 by merging the previous districts of Pritzwalk and Perleberg and a few municipalities from the district Kyritz. The westernmost part of the district was previously part of Mecklenburg-Western Pomerania and became part of Brandenburg on August 1, 1992.

The earlier district of Prignitz was the buffer between Brandenburg and Mecklenburg. It was resettled by Germans, especially from the Bremen area, following the First Wendish Crusade of 1147. The rate of German settlement increased over the following decades. The eastern half was dominated by the pro-German counts von Plotho who brought their own vassals such as the von Blumenthal and von Grabow families with them. The western half was dominated by robber barons, especially the Gans zu Putlitz family and their vassals, the von Quitzows. In 1319 the territory was briefly controlled by Mecklenburg. When Frederick, Count of Zollern was appointed Margrave in 1411, he faced an uprising of the Wendish nobility, supported by the Wendish Duke of Mecklenburg. However, he was able to put down the revolt at the battle of the Cremmer Dam, with the support of the German nobility. Families who had stayed loyal were rewarded. Otto von Blumenthal, for example, was made Captain of the Prignitz from 1415 to 1422 and of Lenzen from 1420.

== Demography ==
Development of population since 1875 within the current Boundaries (Blue Line: Population; Dotted Line: Comparison to Population development in Brandenburg state; Grey Background: Time of Nazi Germany; Red Background: Time of communist East Germany)

Recent Population Development and Projections (Population Development before Census 2011 (blue line); Recent Population Development according to the Census in Germany in 2011 (blue bordered line); Official projections for 2005-2030 (yellow line); for 2014-2030 (red line); for 2017-2030 (scarlet line)

Landkreis Prignitz: Population development
within the current boundaries (2025)

Year	Pop.	±% p.a.
1875	89,625	—
1890	92,023	+0.18%
1910	104,107	+0.62%
1925	113,250	+0.56%
1933	112,411	−0.09%
1939	115,354	+0.43%
1946	156,782	+4.48%
1950	153,728	−0.49%
1964	129,143	−1.24%
1971	128,537	−0.07%

Year	Pop.	±% p.a.
1981	117,182	−0.92%
1985	114,812	−0.51%
1990	109,435	−0.95%
1995	101,421	−1.51%
2000	95,701	−1.15%
2005	88,340	−1.59%
2010	82,023	−1.47%
2015	77,573	−1.11%
2020	76,096	−0.38%
2025	74,942	−0.31%

== Coat of arms ==
District banner of Prignitz

The coat of arms shows a goose preparing for flight, the symbol of the Gans zu Putlitz family (Gans is German for goose), who in the 12th century were one of a number of families (such as the von Plotho, von Blumenthal and von Arnim families) who introduced Christianity and German culture to Prignitz. The pearls around the goose symbolize Perleberg (which translates to Pearl Mountain). The wolf at bottom stands for the former administrative seat, Pritzwalk, as walk derives from the Slavonic wolk meaning wolf. The wavy separation between the top and bottom symbolizes the river Elbe; the colors red and white are those of Brandenburg.

== Towns and municipalities ==
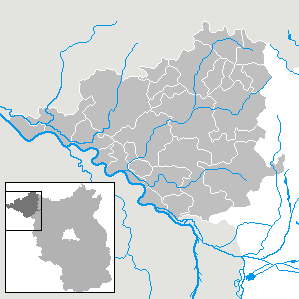
Clickable map of towns and municipalities in the district

Amt-free towns	Ämter
1. Perleberg; 2. Pritzwalk; 3. Wittenberge; Amt-free municipalities: 1. Groß Pankow (Prignitz); 2. Gumtow; 3. Karstädt; 4. Plattenburg	1. Bad Wilsnack/Weisen; 1. Bad Wilsnack^{1, 2}; 2. Breese; 3. Legde/Quitzöbel; 4. Rühstädt; 5. Weisen; 2. Lenzen-Elbtalaue; 1. Cumlosen; 2. Lanz; 3. Lenzen (Elbe)^{1, 2}; 4. Lenzerwische	3. Meyenburg; 1. Gerdshagen; 2. Halenbeck-Rohlsdorf; 3. Kümmernitztal; 4. Marienfließ; 5. Meyenburg^{1, 2}; 4. Putlitz-Berge; 1. Berge; 2. Gülitz-Reetz; 3. Pirow; 4. Putlitz^{1, 2}; 5. Triglitz
^{1}seat of the Amt; ^{2}town
