= Legde/Quitzöbel =

- Municipality
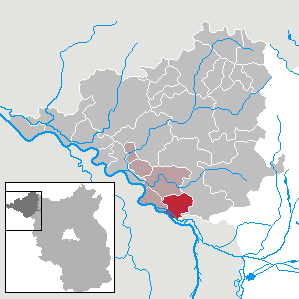
- Location of Legde/Quitzöbel within Prignitz district
- Interactive map of Legde/Quitzöbel
- Location within Germany Location within Brandenburg
- Coordinates: 52°55′00″N 11°58′00″E
- Country: Germany
- State: Brandenburg
- District: Prignitz
- Municipal assoc.: Bad Wilsnack/Weisen

Government
  - Mayor (2024–29): Marius Will

Area
  - Total: 41.42 km^{2} (15.99 sq mi)
- Elevation: 24 m (79 ft)

Population (2025-12-31)
  - Total: 574
  - Density: 13.9/km^{2} (35.9/sq mi)
- Time zone: UTC+01:00 (CET)
  - Summer (DST): UTC+02:00 (CEST)
- Postal codes: 19336
- Dialling codes: 038791
- Vehicle registration: PR
- Website: www.amt-badwilsnack-weisen.de

Legde/Quitzöbel is a municipality in the Prignitz district, in Brandenburg, Germany.

== Demography ==
Development of Population since 1875 within the Current Boundaries (Blue Line: Population; Dotted Line: Comparison to Population Development of Brandenburg state; Grey Background: Time of Nazi rule; Red Background: Time of Communist rule)

Legde/Quitzöbel: Population development
within the current boundaries (2013)

Year	Pop.	±% p.a.
1875	1,554	—
1890	1,513	−0.18%
1910	1,318	−0.69%
1925	1,438	+0.58%
1933	1,362	−0.68%
1939	1,357	−0.06%
1946	1,873	+4.71%
1950	1,825	−0.65%
1964	1,149	−3.25%
1971	1,109	−0.50%
1981	925	−1.80%
1985	917	−0.22%
1989	921	+0.11%
1990	926	+0.54%
1991	900	−2.81%
1992	864	−4.00%
1993	860	−0.46%
1994	849	−1.28%
1995	859	+1.18%
1996	844	−1.75%

Year	Pop.	±% p.a.
1997	815	−3.44%
1998	794	−2.58%
1999	788	−0.76%
2000	775	−1.65%
2001	751	−3.10%
2002	756	+0.67%
2003	754	−0.26%
2004	738	−2.12%
2005	721	−2.30%
2006	706	−2.08%
2007	697	−1.27%
2008	702	+0.72%
2009	672	−4.27%
2010	656	−2.38%
2011	634	−3.35%
2012	623	−1.74%
2013	606	−2.73%
2014	625	+3.14%
2015	619	−0.96%
2016	595	−3.88%
