= Stepenitz (Elbe) =

River in Germany

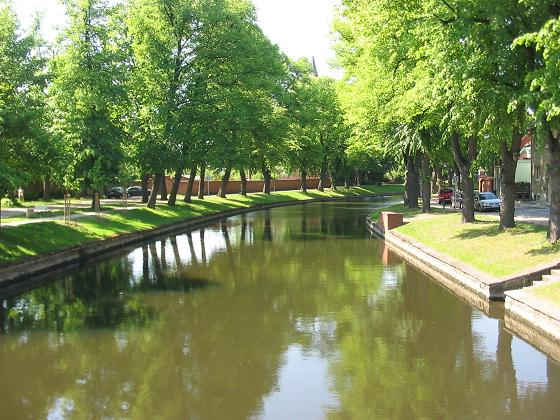
- The Stepenitz in Perleberg

Location
- Country: Germany
- State: Brandenburg

Physical characteristics
- Source
  - location: Brandenburg
- Mouth
  - location: Elbe
  - coordinates: 52°59′22″N 11°44′47″E
- Length: 84 km (52 mi)

Basin features
- Progression: Elbe→ North Sea

The Stepenitz (German pronunciation: [ˈʃteːpənɪts]) is a river in the district of Prignitz, Brandenburg, Germany. It is a right tributary of the Elbe and runs for approximately 84 kilometers. The Dömnitz is a left tributary of the Stepenitz.

The Stepenitz's source is about five kilometers south of Meyenburg. Along with the Karthane, the Stepenitz flows into the Elbe at Wittenberge.

The Gänsetour ("geese tour") is an approximately 70 km long bicycle route along the Stepenitz. It is named in honor of the family Gans zu Putlitz, one of the oldest noble families of Brandenburg.

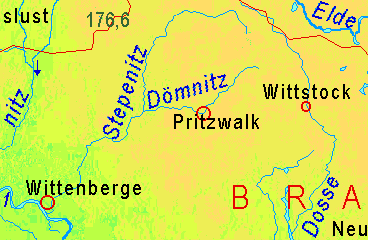
Course of the Stepenitz in Brandenburg

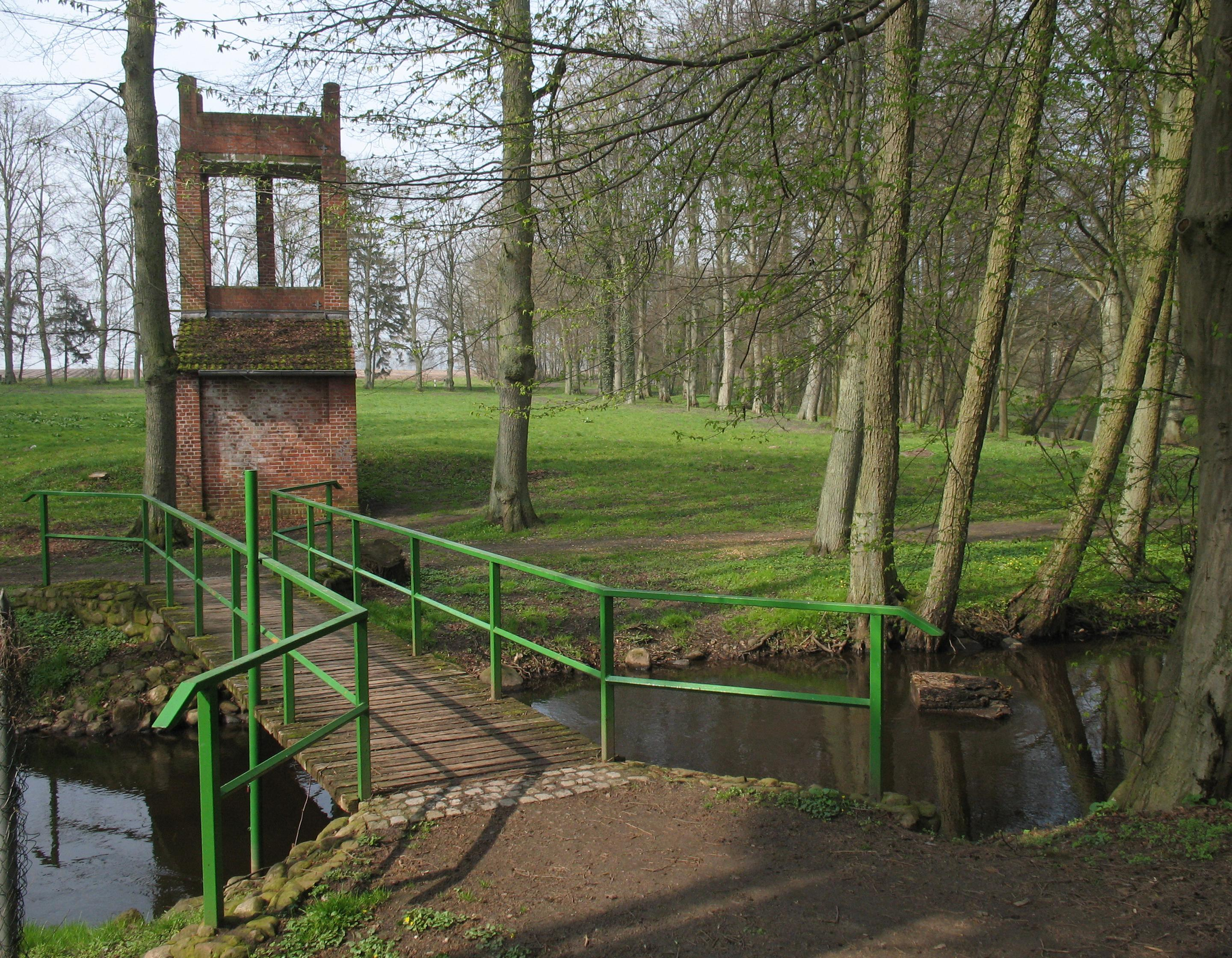
Stepenitz in Putlitz

Localities on the Stepenitz include:

- Meyenburg
- Marienfließ
- Putlitz
- Wolfshagen
- Perleberg
- Wittenberge

== See also ==
- List of rivers of Brandenburg
