= Dömnitz =

River in Germany

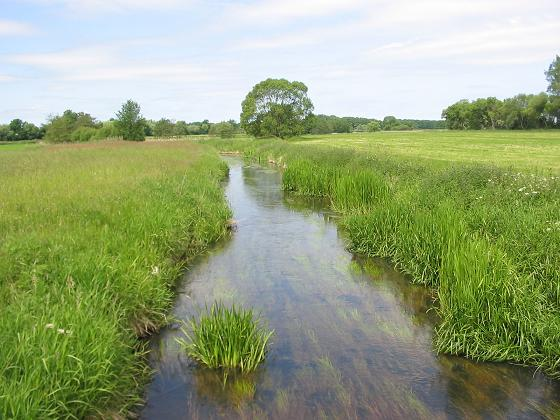

Location
- Country: Germany
- State: Brandenburg

Physical characteristics
- Mouth
  - location: Stepenitz
  - coordinates: 53.1575°N 12.0242°E
- Length: 29.5 km (18.3 mi)

Basin features
- Progression: Stepenitz→ Elbe→ North Sea

Dömnitz (German pronunciation: [ˈdøːmnɪts]) is a river of Brandenburg, Germany. It is a tributary of the Stepenitz, which it joins near Wolfshagen. It flows through the town Pritzwalk.

== See also ==
- List of rivers of Brandenburg
