= Ulrich Woronowicz =

Ulrich Woronowicz (26 January 1928–7 December 2011) was an East German Protestant theologian and writer.

== Life ==
Woronowicz was born in Schimonken(now Szymonka in Poland) in Kreis Sensburg in East Prussia. He was the son of Karl Woronowicz, a pastor of the Confessing Church. He grew up in Stallupönen(now Nesterov in Kaliningrad Oblast, Russia) where he attended the Volksschule and the Gymnasium. From 1944 he was a member of the naval reserve in Memel and Swinemünde. In 1946 he took his Abitur in Rendsburg.

Up to 1951 Woronowicz studied evangelical theology in Rostock und Berlin. From 1952 he worked as a pastor in Buchholz near Pritzwalk. In 1964 he was appointed to the Marienkirche, Berlin, but was prevented from moving to Berlin by the Stasi From 1968 he was a pastor in Wittenberge in the Prignitz. In May 1969 he gained a doctorate in theology at the Martin Luther University of Halle-Wittenberg on the subject of Die Funktion des Schlagers in der Gesellschaft und seine Bedeutung für das Menschenbild in der christlichen Verkündigung ("The function of the popular hit in society and its significance for the image of man in the Christian mission"). From 1983 to 1993 Woronowicz was Superintendent of the Kirchenkreis of Havelberg/Wilsnack.

As a student Woronowicz was already active as a representative of the Liberal Democratic Party of Germany (LPD) in student opposition to the inroads of the state.

In the course of his activity as a theologian in East Germany he opposed the state-driven erosion of the church's legal position and the consequent limitation of the church's ability to make effective criticism. In a lecture of 1973 he warned the church against "subordination to the prevailing circumstances" ("Unterordnung unter die vorgegebenen Verhältnisse") and the assumption that the realities of the DDR had any eternal aspect. Instead he demanded of the church the courage to change existing society. He was also actively involved in human rights issues.

Woronowicz was under close surveillance for many years by the Stasi, who in 1964 prevented him from moving to his post in Berlin and later also blocked his habilitation. In 1983 he published the samizdat manifesto "Der Marxismus als Heilslehre" ("Marxism as a Teaching of Salvation"). In the 70s and 80s, he also wrote socio-critical song texts.

After his retirement in 1993 Woronowicz was active in Berlin as a theologian, expert on ecclesiastical law and philosopher of religion.

He died in Berlin in 2011, a year after his wife, Ruth.

In 2014, the piece of music "Wo........ (The White Raven)" for 10-string guitar was composed in memory of him.

== Selected works ==
- Die Funktion des Schlagers in der Gesellschaft und seine Bedeutung für das Menschenbild in der christlichen Verkündigung. Halle 1969
- Variable Wertesysteme als Basis zwischenmenschlicher Beziehungen. Verlag Heinz-Gerhard Greve: Wiesbaden, 1985 ISBN 3-925259-00-7 (new edition: LIT Verlag Münster 1997, ISBN 3-8258-3505-7; also available as an ebook in English: Variable Value Systems as Basis for Interpersonal Relations)
- Evangelische Kirche St. Nikolai Bad Wilsnack. Schnell und Steiner: Regensburg, 1994
- Evangelische Kirche - Demokratie - Stasi-Aufarbeitung (joint author with Gerhard Besier, Michael J Inacker, Peter Maser, Christoph Lenhartz (ed. and foreword). Editions La Colombe (1997) ISBN 3-929351-04-8
- Sozialismus als Heilslehre. Editions La Colombe: Bergisch Gladbach, 2000 ISBN 3-929351-10-2
- Tagebuch 1958 bis 1960. Als Dorfpfarrer in Brandenburg. Mitteldeutscher Verlag: Halle, 2010 ISBN 978-3-89812-790-5
- Several of his shorter works are available as ebooks via a personal website:
  - Das Deutschlandlied
  - Mercedes
  - Die Rettung
  - Die verlorene Gerechtigkeit
  - Ein guter Tag
  - Bernstein
  - Das bittere Ende des Kollegen Hopke
  - Begegnung mit der Vergangenheit
- Die Geschichte von Bodo, der Nitrolösung trank (song text)

== Sources ==
- Bruce, Gary, 2010: The Firm: The Inside Story of the Stasi. OUP (googlebooks)
- Heydemann, Günther, Mai, Günther, Müller, Werner (eds.), 1999: Revolution und Transformation in der DDR 1989/90. Duncker & Humblot: Berlin
- Neubert, Ehrhart, 1995: Von der Freiheit eines Christenmenschen. Protestantische Wurzeln widerständigen Verhaltens. In: Ulrike Poppe, Rainer Eckart, Ilko-Sascha Kowalczuk (eds.): Zwischen Selbstbehauptung und Anpassung: Formen des Widerstands und der Opposition in der DDR. Berlin
- Neubert, Ehrhart, 1998 (2nd edition): Geschichte der Opposition in der DDR. Ch. Links Verlag: Berlin (googlebooks)
- Neubert, Ehrhart, 2002: Was waren Opposition, Widerstand und Dissidenz in der DDR? Zur Kategorisierung politischer Gegnerschaft. In: Ulrich Hermann (ed.): Protestierende Jugend. Weinheim und München
- SAMIZDAT. Alternative Kultur in Zentral- und Osteuropa. Die 60er bis 80er Jahre (exhibition catalogue). Edition Temmen: Bremen 2000
