= Ulrich Makosch =

- Born: March 17, 1933; Wittenberge, Brandenburg, Germany
- Died: May 16, 2008 (aged 75); Berlin, Germany
- Occupation: Television journalist
- Political party: SED
- Spouse: Waltraut
- Children: 3

Ulrich Makosch (17 March 1933 – 16 May 2008) was a German print and, more particularly as his career progressed, television journalist.

During the 1960s and 1970s he worked as a foreign correspondent: assignments included the Vietnam War. During the 1970s and 1980s his work became more focused on political editorship with the East German Television Corporation. Following the end of the German Democratic Republic as a stand-alone state, he also worked for the American CNN channel in 1990 and 1991.

== Life ==
Ulrich Makosch was born into a working-class family, in Wittenberge, a mid-sized manufacturing town on the north bank of the Elbe, some 160 km (100 miles) to the north-west of Berlin. Some two months before Makosch was born the Hitler government had taken power in Germany. When he was 12 the war ended, and his part of what remained of Germany became the Soviet occupation zone, which would be transformed over the next few years into the German Democratic Republic (East Germany), sponsored by and politically modelled on the Soviet Union. After passing his school final exams, he studied at the "Karl Marx University" (as became known in 1953) at Leipzig. He emerged in 1955 with a degree in journalism. He had already joined the national Union of Journalists in 1952, but it was not till 1963, his thirtieth year, that he became a member of the country's ruling Socialist Unity Party of Germany (SED / Sozialistische Einheitspartei Deutschlands).

""...many of the journalists were ready, [when the 1989 revolution came] with pleasure, to work along journalistic lines."”

Ulrich Makosch ...quoted in July 1990 (before he had been publicly identified as a former IM).

From 1955 till 1956 he worked as an editor for the local radio station in Schwerin. He then, from 1956 till 1964, worked as an editor and travel correspondent for the country's national broadcasting committee, a committee modeled on its Soviet equivalent that controlled radio, and increasingly television broadcasting. From 1965 till 1971 Makosch worked as a chief foreign correspondent for the East German Television Corporation, focused on south-east Asia and based, for much of the time, in Djakarta and Singapore. He also wrote reports about the region, notably about the 1965 putsch in Indonesia and, later, about the Vietnam War, and published numerous books on these and related topics. From 1972 till 1975 he was deputy chief editor for reportage and documentary with the television company, after which, for fifteen years till 1990, he was deputy chief editor of the long-running news programme (viewed in some quarters as a "propaganda tool") Aktuelle Kamera. For many years he also fronted Objektiv, a weekly political television programme focused on foreign policy concerns and issues. In 1990/1991 he worked for CNN.

From 1978 till 1989 he served as a member of the Berlin district party leadership. He served on the GDR-Mozambique Friendship Committee between 1978 and 1990. He became also a volunteer member of the Society for the Protection of Civil Rights and Human Values, an organisation established following German reunification by members of the former East German establishment, including lawyers, scientists and State Security officers/collaborators in response to concerns that they might face gratuitous hostility or injustice because of things alleged to have happened under the old East German regime.

After 1990 it transpired that he had served the Ministry for State Security since the 1950s as a secret informer, recorded in the Stasi files from 1969 under the code name "IMB Primus".
