= Görres Society =

The Görres Society (German: Görres-Gesellschaft) is a German learned society, whose goal is to foster interdisciplinarity and apply scientific principles to different disciplines, based in the Catholic tradition. The Gorres society is divided into 20 sections, in which members meet at the annual general meeting.

== History ==
The Görres Society was founded on 25 January 1876 in Koblenz by Catholic scientists and writers as the Görres-Gesellschaft zur Pflege der katholischen Wissenschaften (Görres Society for the Cultivation of Catholic Sciences) in honour of Joseph Görres to advance Catholic studies. Its co-founder, initiator and first president was Georg von Hertling, who was later Reich Chancellor of Germany.

It was dissolved by the Nazis in 1941 and founded anew in 1948 in Cologne.

== Presidents ==
- Georg von Hertling (1877-1919), politician and philosopher
- Hermann von Grauert (1920–1924), historian
- Heinrich Finke (1924–1938), church historian and medievalist
- Hans Peters (legal scholar) (1940–1941, 1948-1966), legal scholar and politician
- Paul Mikat (1967–2007), legal scholar and politician
- Wolfgang Bergsdorf (2007–present), political scientist
