= Hermann von Grauert =

German historian (1850–1924)

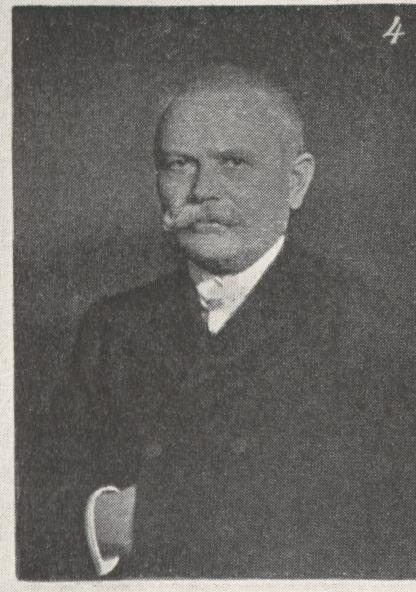
- Born: 7 September 1850; Pritzwalk, Germany
- Died: 12 March 1924 (aged 73); Munich, Germany
- Occupation: Historian

Hermann Heinrich Grauert (7 September 1850 – 12 March 1924) since 1914 Knight of Grauert, was a German historian. He was born in Pritzwalk and died in Munich.

== Life ==
After attending the Realschule in Wittstock, Grauert initially worked in his father's manufactured goods shop. In 1872 he went to Münster where in 1873 he sat exams in Latin, Greek and history, in order to obtain a qualification equivalent to the Abitur, to enable him to attend university. From 1873 to 1876 he studied history at the University of Göttingen and received his PhD under Georg Waitz. Grauert then extended his historical and legal knowledge at the Humboldt University of Berlin, the Ludwig-Maximilians-Universität München (LMU) and the University of Strasbourg.

Since his student days, Grauert was an avid Kartellverband member in Göttingen in K.St.V. Winfridia, in Berlin at the Catholic Reading Club (now K.St.V. Askania-Burgundia Berlin) and in Munich in the K.St.V. Ottonia. Later, he was still in further Kartellverband compounds honor Philistines, such as at Alamannia and Rheno-Bavaria, Munich. In the Festschrift for the 25th anniversary of the Association, Hermann von Grauert 1906 is shown as an honorary member.

In 1877, Grauert was an intern at the National Archives active in Munich; he habilitated in 1883 after a stay in Rome, and became a full-time professor in 1885 at the LMU, where he was the rector through 1915 and 1916.

In 1884, Grauert board member since 1885 and editor of History Yearbook of Görres Society. Grauert played a prominent role in the society until his death.

In Germany and Europe, he was highly regarded as a scientist. Grauert was Privy Councillor and was created in 1914 by King Ludwig III. with the Knight's Cross of the Order of Merit of the Bavarian Crown encumbered. This was associated with the collection in the personal nobility, and he was allowed after entry into the Matricula Knights of Grauert call. In Munich Harlaching the "Grauertstraße" was named after him in 1959.

The women's rights activist Lida Gustava Heymann described him as "stock Catholic".

== Works ==
- Die Kaisergräber im Dom zu Speyer. 1901.
- Meister Johann von Toledo. 1901.
- Dante und Houston Stewart Chamberlain. 1903.
- Görres in Straßburg. 1910.

== Literature ==
- S. Koß. In: Biographisches Lexikon des KV. Band 5 (1998) S. 59ff. ISBN 3-89498-055-9 m.w.N.
- Ansgar Frenken: Hermann von Grauert. In: Biographisch-Bibliographisches
- Kirchenlexikon (BBKL). Band 30, Bautz, Nordhausen 2009, ISBN 978-3-88309-478-6, Sp. 518–522.
