= Karthane =

River in Germany

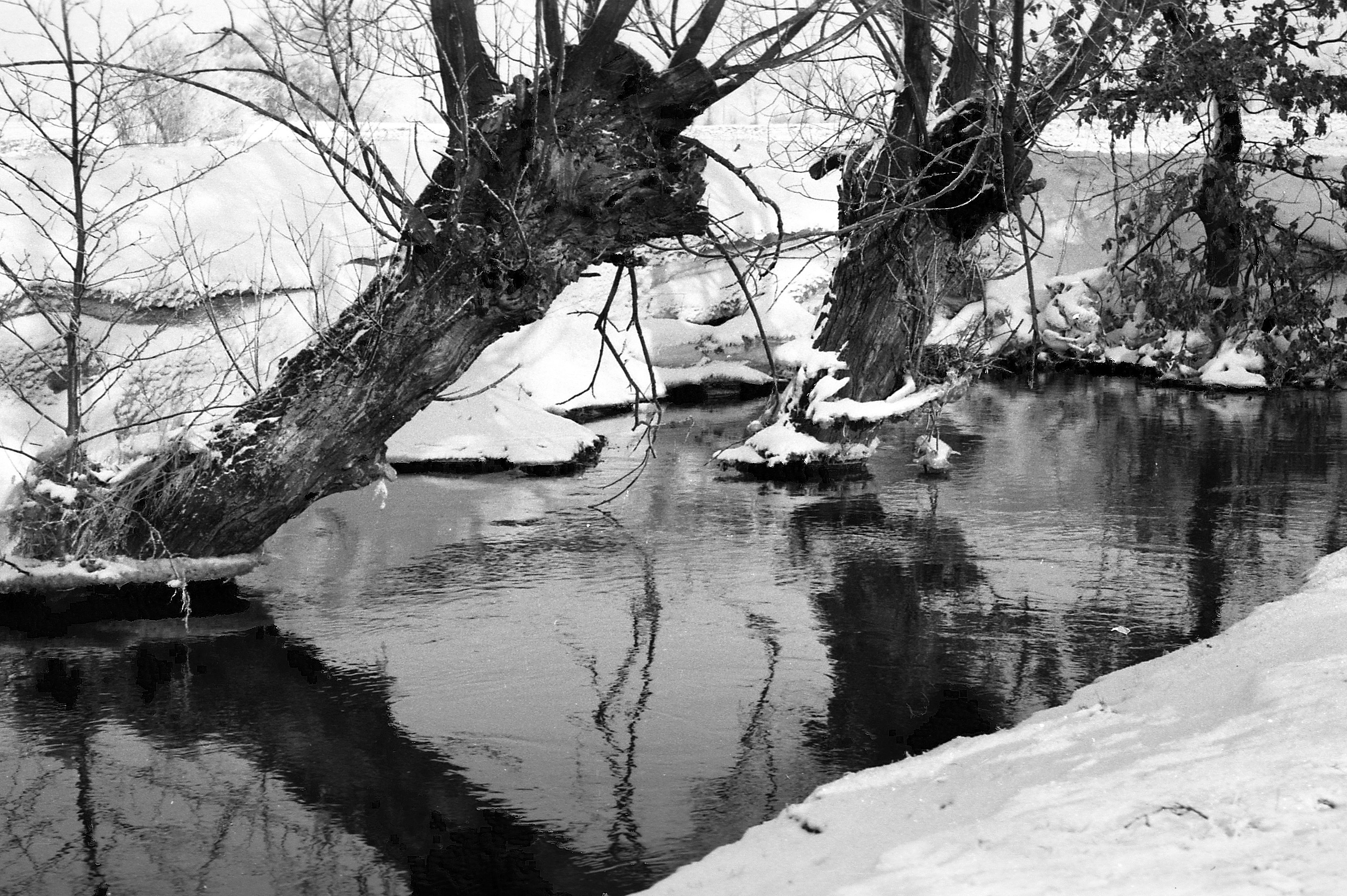

Location
- Country: Germany
- States: Brandenburg

Physical characteristics
- Mouth
  - location: Stepenitz
  - coordinates: 52.9876°N 11.7639°E

Basin features
- Progression: Stepenitz→ Elbe→ North Sea

Karthane is a river of Brandenburg, Germany. It flows into the Stepenitz in Wittenberge.

== See also ==
- List of rivers of Brandenburg
