= Groß Pankow (Prignitz) =

- Municipality
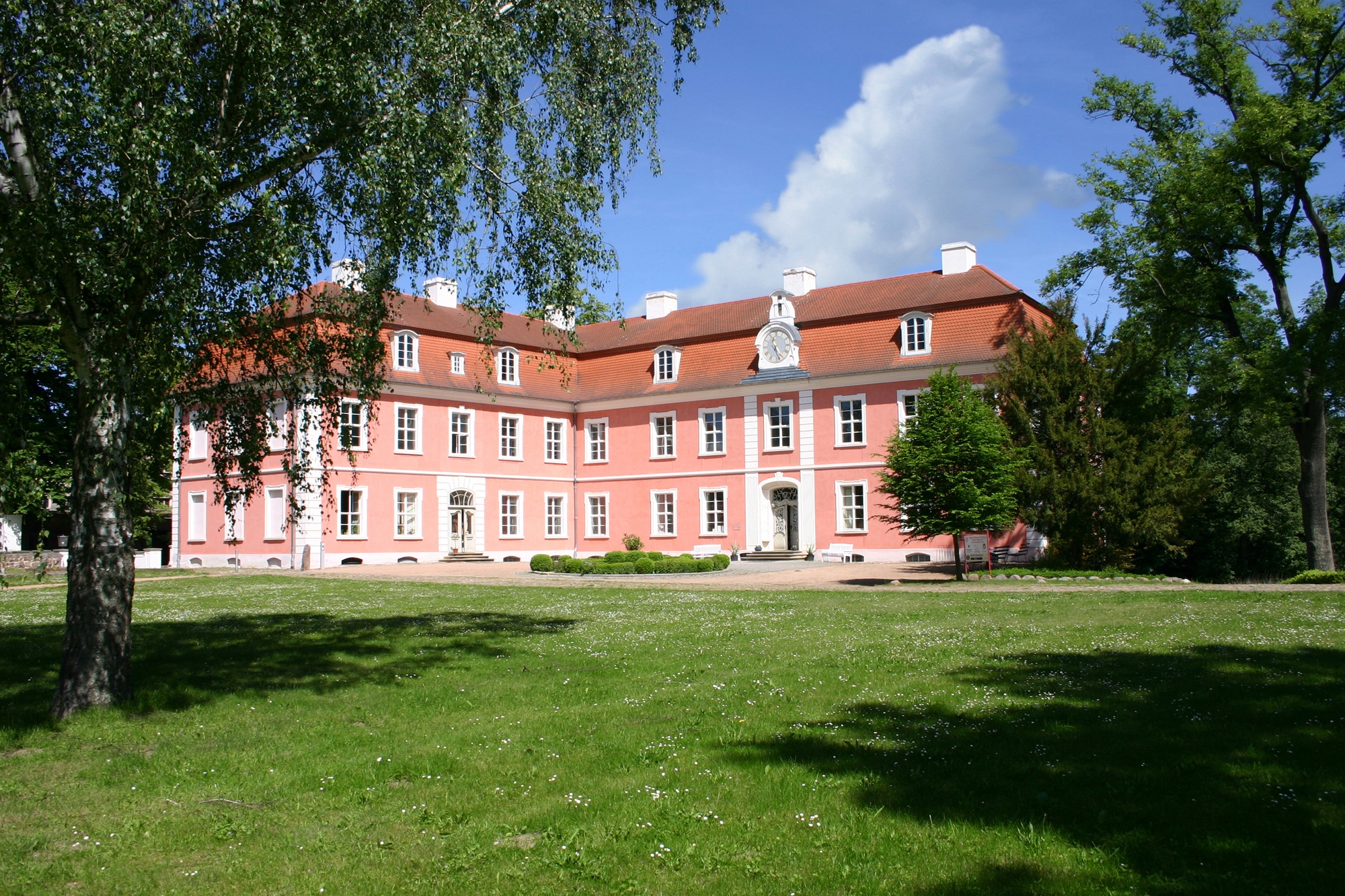
- Wolfshagen manor

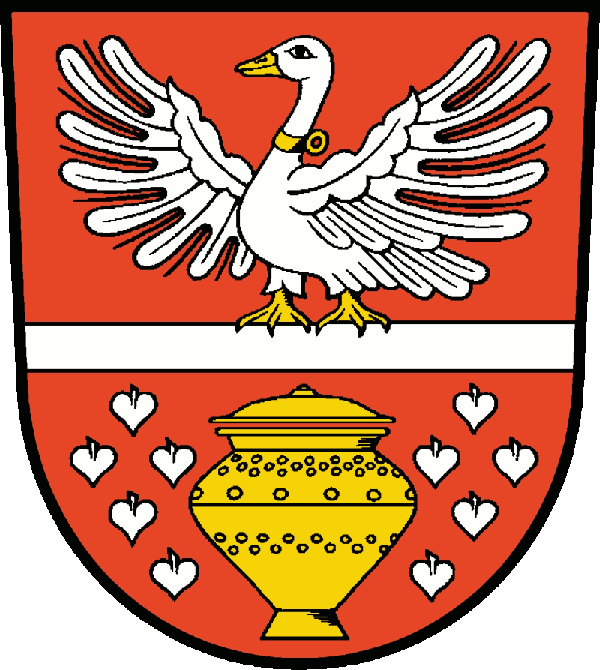
- Coat of arms

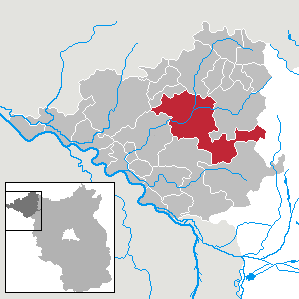
- Location of Groß Pankow within Prignitz district
- Interactive map of Groß Pankow
- Location within Germany Location within Brandenburg
- Coordinates: 53°07′00″N 12°03′00″E
- Country: Germany
- State: Brandenburg
- District: Prignitz
- Subdivisions: 18 Ortsteile

Government
  - Mayor (2024–32): Marco Radloff

Area
  - Total: 248.79 km^{2} (96.06 sq mi)
- Elevation: 60 m (200 ft)

Population (2025-12-31)
  - Total: 3,777
  - Density: 15.18/km^{2} (39.32/sq mi)
- Time zone: UTC+01:00 (CET)
  - Summer (DST): UTC+02:00 (CEST)
- Postal codes: 16928; 19348
- Dialling codes: 033983
- Vehicle registration: PR
- Website: www.grosspankow.de

Groß Pankow (Prignitz) is a municipality in Prignitz district, Brandenburg, in northern Germany. The municipality was formed in 2001 from the union of municipalities of the former Amt of Groß Pankow/Prignitz and some in Amt Pritzwalk-Land. Amt Groß Pankow/Prignitz was then dissolved.

Groß Pankow is connected via German Federal Highway B 189 to the cities of Pritzwalk, Perleberg, Wittenberge and Magdeburg.

== Geography ==
The municipality has 39 villages in 18 districts with the populations given in parentheses (As of March 1, 2010)

- Baek (287)
  - Baek (222)
  - Strigleben (65)
- Boddin-Langnow (240)
  - Boddin (153)
  - Heidelberg (30)
  - Langnow (57)
- Groß Pankow (587)
  - Groß Pankow (551)
  - Luggendorf (36)
- Groß Woltersdorf (159)
  - Brünkendorf (14)
  - Groß Woltersdorf (86)
  - Klein Woltersdorf (59)
- Gulow-Steinberg (146)
  - Gulow (94)
  - Steinberg (52)
- Helle (303)
  - Groß Langerwisch (224)
  - Helle (45)
  - Neudorf (34)
- Kehrberg (260)
- Klein Gottschow (173)
  - Guhlsdorf (50)
  - Klein Gottschow (89)
  - Simonshagen (34)
- Kuhbier (213)
- Kuhsdorf (192)
  - Bullendorf (58)
  - Kuhsdorf (134)
- Lindenberg (271)
- Retzin (275)
  - Klein Linde (46)
  - Kreuzburg (30)
  - Retzin (129)
  - Rohlsdorf (70)
- Seddin (113)
- Tacken (97)
- Tangendorf-Hohenvier (120)
  - Hohenvier (35)
  - Tangendorf (85)
- Tüchen (231)
  - Klenzenhof (42)
  - Reckenthin (99)
  - Tüchen (90)
- Vettin (107)
- Wolfshagen (383)
  - Dannhof (43)
  - Hellburg (46)
  - Horst (43)
  - Wolfshagen (251)

== History ==
From 1815 to 1945, the constituent localities of Groß Pankow were part of the Prussian Province of Brandenburg. From 1952 to 1990, they were part of the Bezirk Potsdam of East Germany.

During the final stages of World War II, on 6 March 1945, Groß Pankow was the site of a stopover during the German-organised march of Polish prisoners of war from the Oflag II-D camp to the Stalag X-B camp. One French prisoner of the Leopoldshall subcamp of the Buchenwald concentration camp died in Groß Pankow either during or shortly after the evacuation of the subcamp.

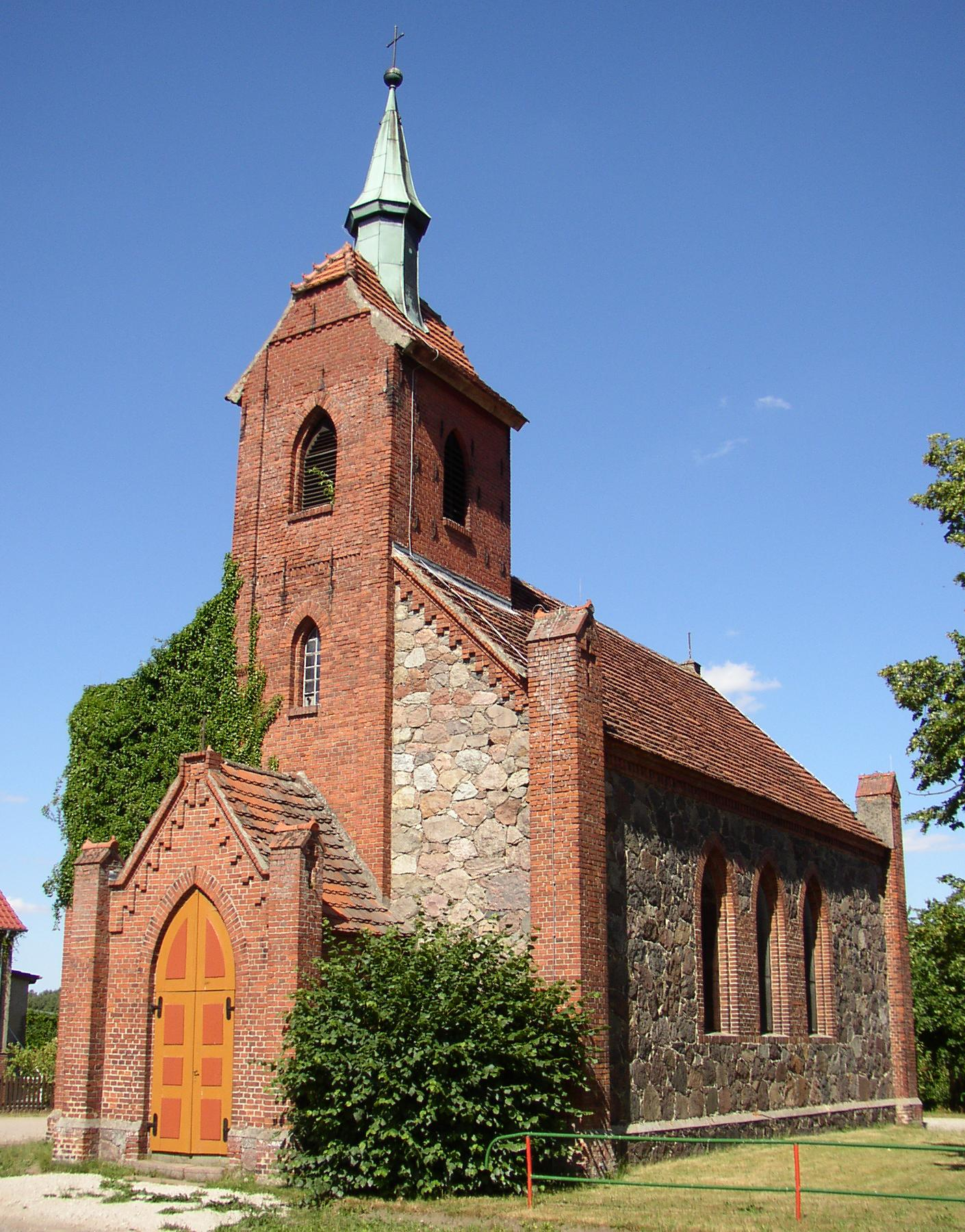
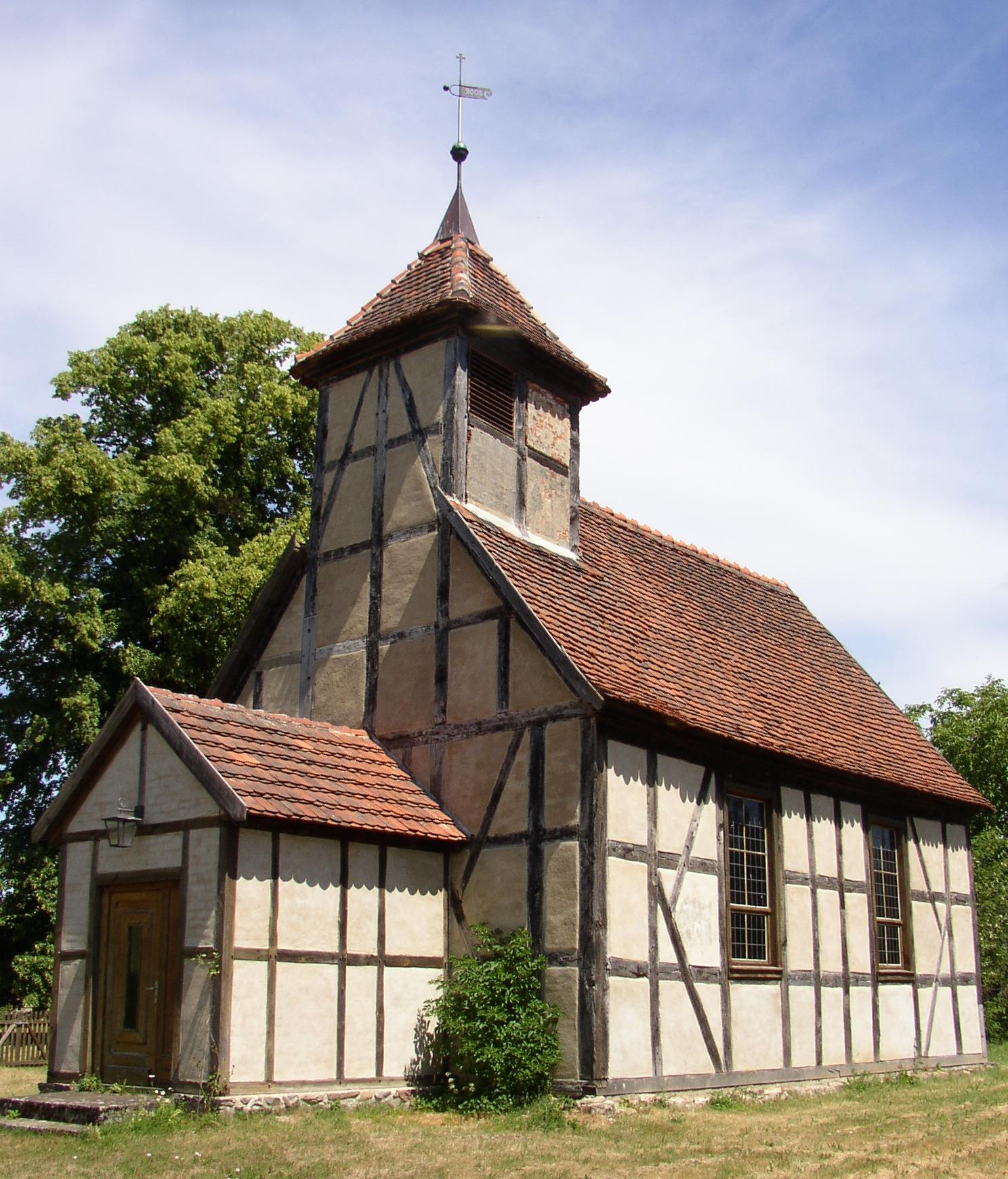
Churches in Boddin, Kehrberg, Langnow, Reckenthin, Tüchen and Vettin

== Demography ==
Development of population since 1875 within the current Boundaries (Blue Line: Population; Dotted Line: Comparison to Population development in Brandenburg state; Grey Background: Time of Nazi Germany; Red Background: Time of communist East Germany)

Recent Population Development and Projections (Population Development before Census 2011 (blue line); Recent Population Development according to the Census in Germany in 2011 (blue bordered line); Official projections for 2005-2030 (yellow line); for 2017-2030 (scarlet line); for 2020-2030 (green line)

Groß Pankow (Prignitz): Population development
within the current boundaries (2020)

Year	Pop.	±% p.a.
1875	6,795	—
1890	6,478	−0.32%
1910	6,297	−0.14%
1925	6,714	+0.43%
1939	6,255	−0.50%
1950	10,034	+4.39%
1964	7,223	−2.32%

Year	Pop.	±% p.a.
1971	7,099	−0.25%
1981	5,840	−1.93%
1985	5,665	−0.76%
1990	5,387	−1.00%
1995	5,114	−1.03%
2000	4,868	−0.98%
2005	4,560	−1.30%

Year	Pop.	±% p.a.
2010	4,132	−1.95%
2015	3,955	−0.87%
2016	3,962	+0.18%
2017	3,875	−2.20%
2018	3,803	−1.86%
2019	3,789	−0.37%
2020	3,808	+0.50%

== Personalities ==
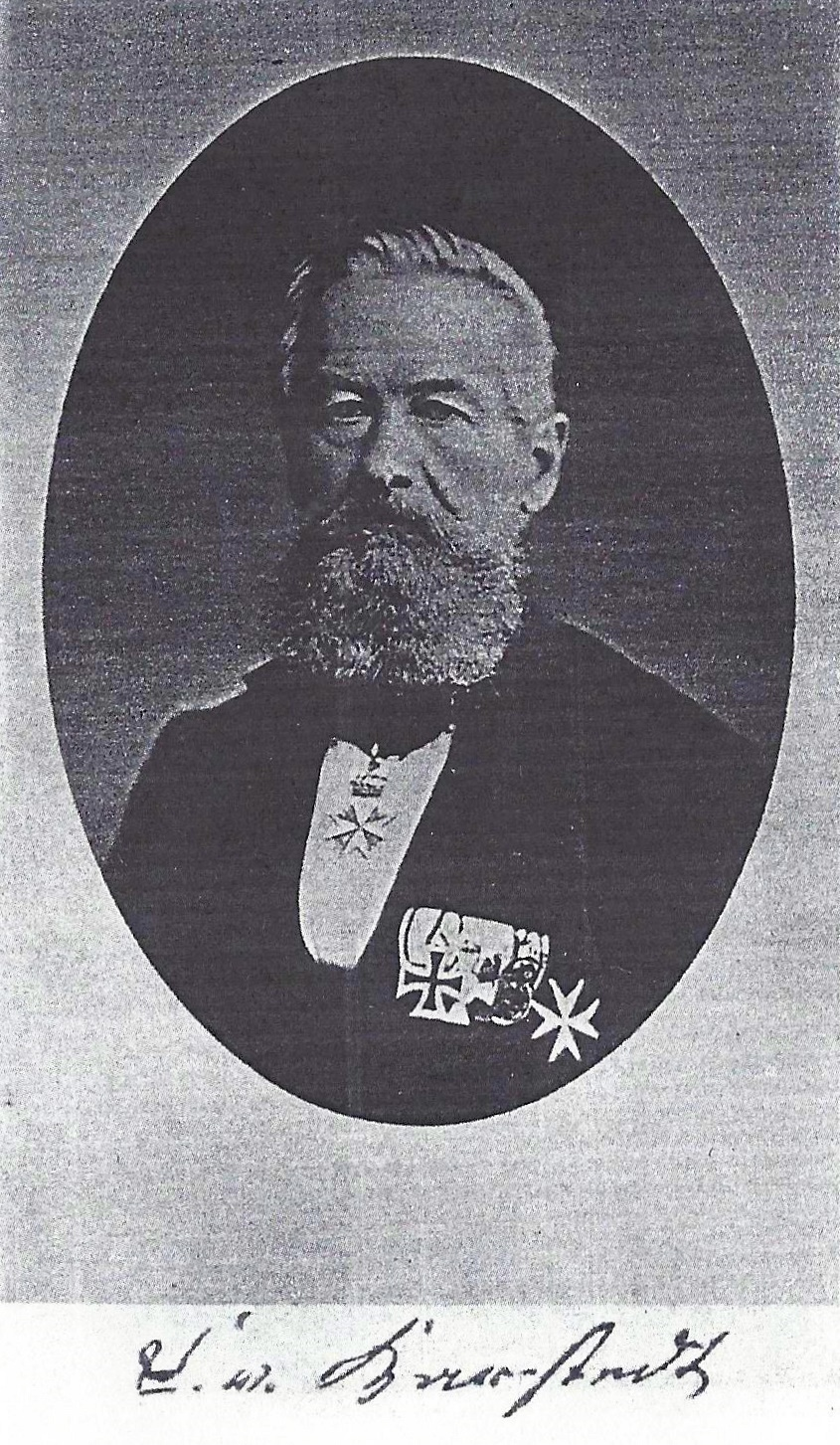
Carl von Karstedt

- Carl von Karstedt (1811-1888), conservative Reichstag deputy, born in Kleinlinde
- Erhard Hübener (1881-1958), DDP and LDPD politician, born in Tacken
- Richard Kackstein (1903-1966), national socialist politician, born in Triglitz
- Joachim Wüstenberg (1908-1993), hygienist in Gelsenkirchen, born in Klenzenhof
