= Perleberg =

- Town
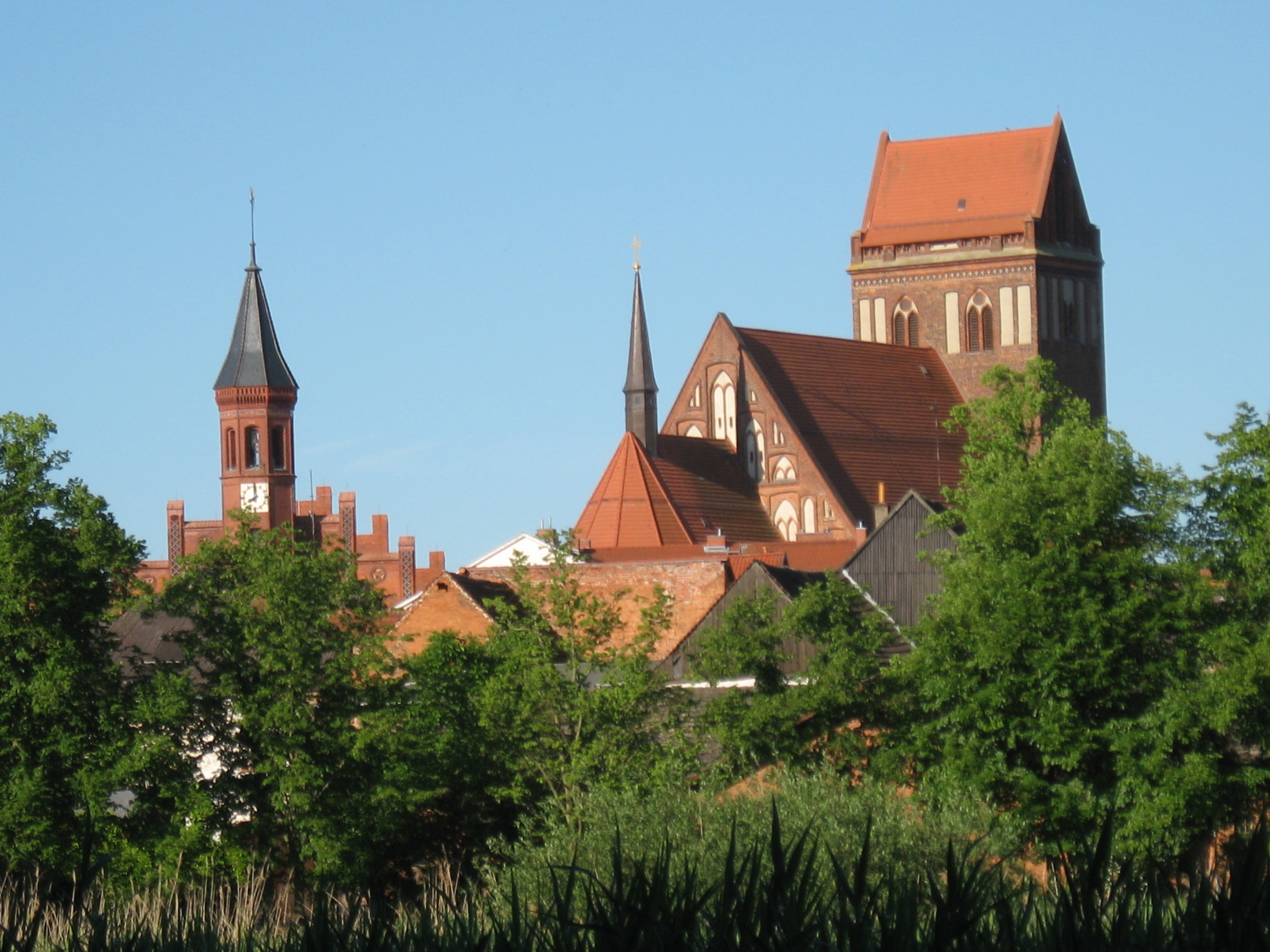
- Town hall and St. James's church

- Coat of arms

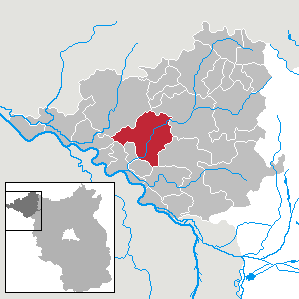
- Location of Perleberg within Prignitz district
- Interactive map of Perleberg
- Location within Germany Location within Brandenburg
- Coordinates: 53°04′N 11°52′E
- Country: Germany
- State: Brandenburg
- District: Prignitz
- Subdivisions: 12 Ortsteile

Government
  - Mayor (2022–30): Axel Schmidt (Independent)

Area
  - Total: 138.69 km^{2} (53.55 sq mi)
- Elevation: 31 m (102 ft)

Population (2025-12-31)
  - Total: 11,917
  - Density: 85.925/km^{2} (222.55/sq mi)
- Time zone: UTC+01:00 (CET)
  - Summer (DST): UTC+02:00 (CEST)
- Postal codes: 19348
- Dialling codes: 03876
- Vehicle registration: PR
- Website: www.stadt-perleberg.de

Perleberg (German: [ˈpɛʁləˌbɛʁk]; North Margravian: Perlberg) is the capital of the district of Prignitz, located in the northwest of the German state of Brandenburg. As of 2022 it has about 12,000 inhabitants. Located in a mostly agricultural area, the town has a long history of troops (most notably Prussian) being stationed there and as an administrative center for local government.

== Geography ==
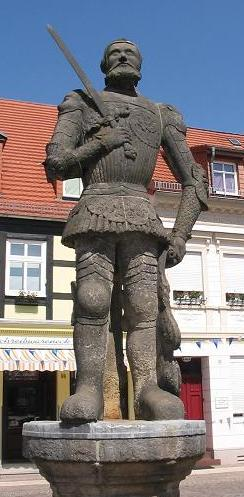
16th century Roland statue

Perleberg is located in the heart of the district of Prignitz, about halfway between the two largest German cities Berlin and Hamburg. It is surrounded by the municipalities Karstädt to the north-west, Gross Pankow (Prignitz) to the north-east, Plattenburg to the south-east; the Ämter Bad Wilsnack/Weisen in the south, Lenzen-Elbtalaue in the west; and the town of Wittenberge to the south-west.

The Stepenitz flows from northeast to southwest through Perleberg. The town's historic center is built on an island between two arms of the river.

== History ==
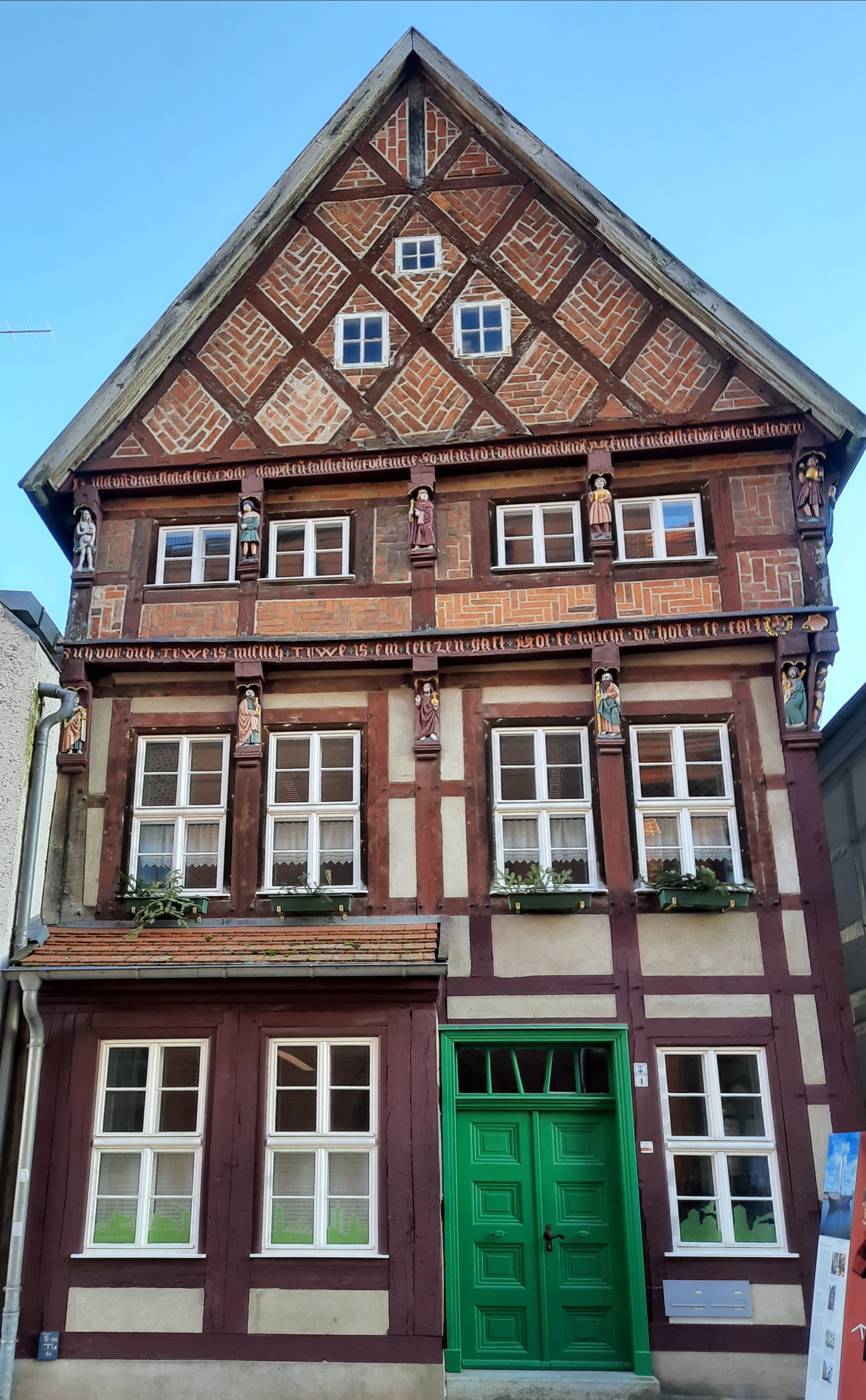
The oldest house of Perleberg

One of the town's oldest buildings is St James's Church. First mentioned in 1294, it was frequently altered and extensively remodelled in the 1850s. In German, it is called the Jakobikirche, and therefore sometimes mistakenly called St Jacob's in English.

Perleberg received municipal rights in 1239. In the 14th century the town was at its height as part of the Hanseatic League. In 1523 it was the muster point for an army assembled by Elector Joachim I in support of his brother-in-law Christian II of Denmark's attempt to recover his throne. The Thirty Years' War caused serious damage to the town: of 3,500 inhabitants, only 300 survived. The mayor responsible for rebuilding the town after this period was Georg Krusemarck.

On November 25, 1809, Benjamin Bathurst disappeared in Perleberg. Later accounts of the incident exaggerated the circumstances to such an extent that the disappearance is sometimes claimed to have been caused by paranormal phenomena.

During the final stages of World War II, on 9 March 1945, Rosenhagen (present district) was the site of a stopover during the German-organised march of French prisoners of war from the Oflag II-B camp to the Oflag VI-A camp.

== Demography ==
Development of population since 1875 within the current Boundaries (Blue Line: Population; Dotted Line: Comparison to Population development in Brandenburg state; Grey Background: Time of Nazi Germany; Red Background: Time of communist East Germany)

Recent Population Development and Projections (Population Development before Census 2011 (blue line); Recent Population Development according to the Census in Germany in 2011 (blue bordered line); Official projections for 2005-2030 (yellow line); for 2017-2030 (scarlet line); for 2020-2030 (green line)

Perleberg: Population development
within the current boundaries (2020)

Year	Pop.	±% p.a.
1875	10,311	—
1890	10,013	−0.20%
1910	12,161	+0.98%
1925	12,882	+0.38%
1939	14,845	+1.02%
1950	17,414	+1.46%
1964	15,983	−0.61%

Year	Pop.	±% p.a.
1971	16,193	+0.19%
1981	16,078	−0.07%
1985	15,736	−0.54%
1990	15,032	−0.91%
1995	14,596	−0.59%
2000	13,907	−0.96%
2005	13,094	−1.20%

Year	Pop.	±% p.a.
2010	12,332	−1.19%
2015	12,204	−0.21%
2016	12,367	+1.34%
2017	12,317	−0.40%
2018	12,141	−1.43%
2019	12,065	−0.63%
2020	12,035	−0.25%

== Twin towns and sister cities ==
Perleberg is twinned with:

- Kaarst, Germany
- Szczawnica, Poland

== People ==
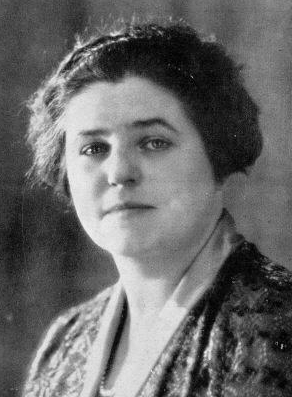
Lotte Lehmann

- Lotte Lehmann, born here
- Dörte von Westernhagen, born here
- Ernst Ehrenbaum (1861–1942), biologist
- James Broh (1867–1942), lawyer, publicist and politician
- Karl Schabrod (1900–1981), German politician
