= Pritzwalk =

- Town
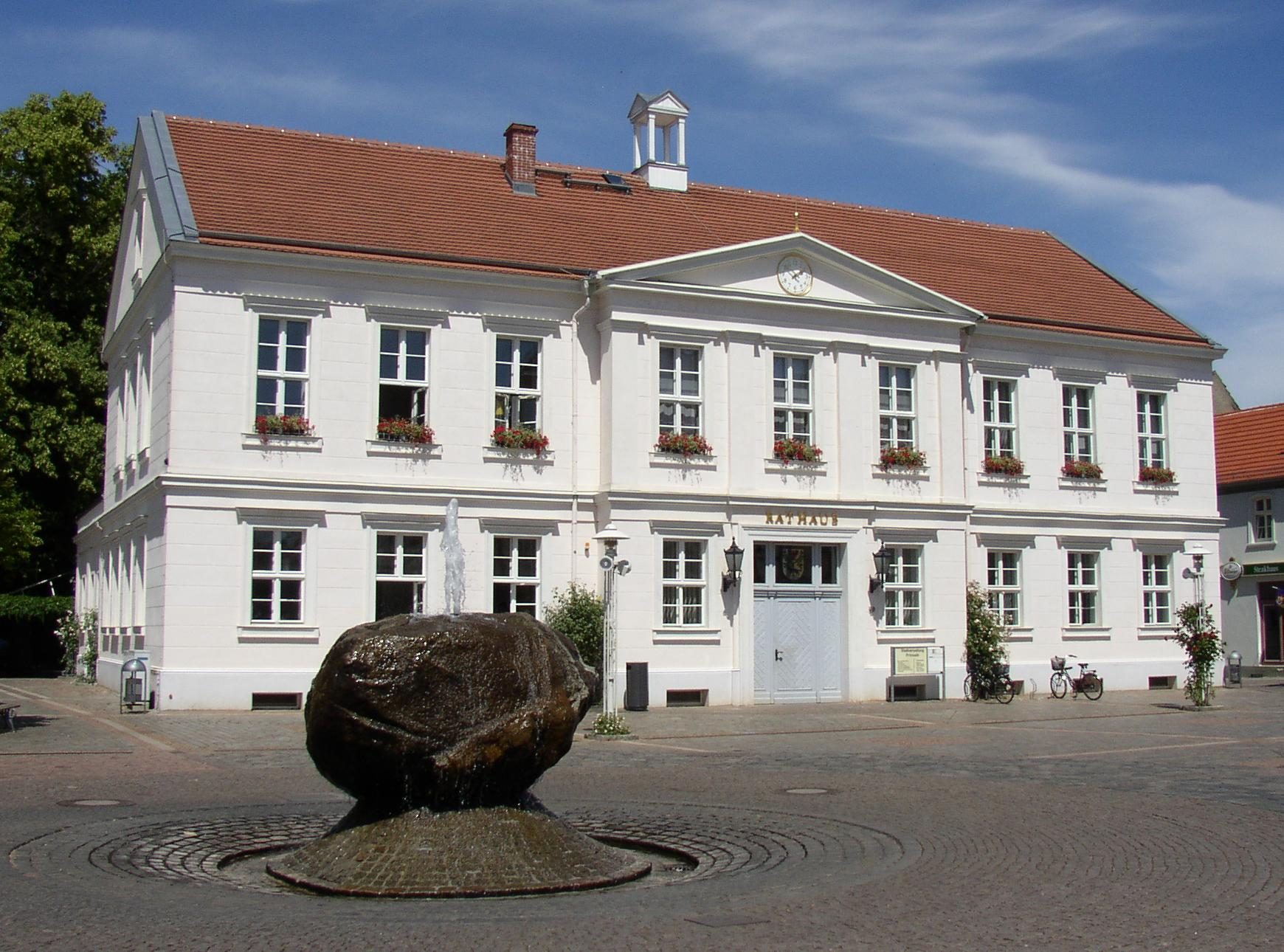
- Town hall

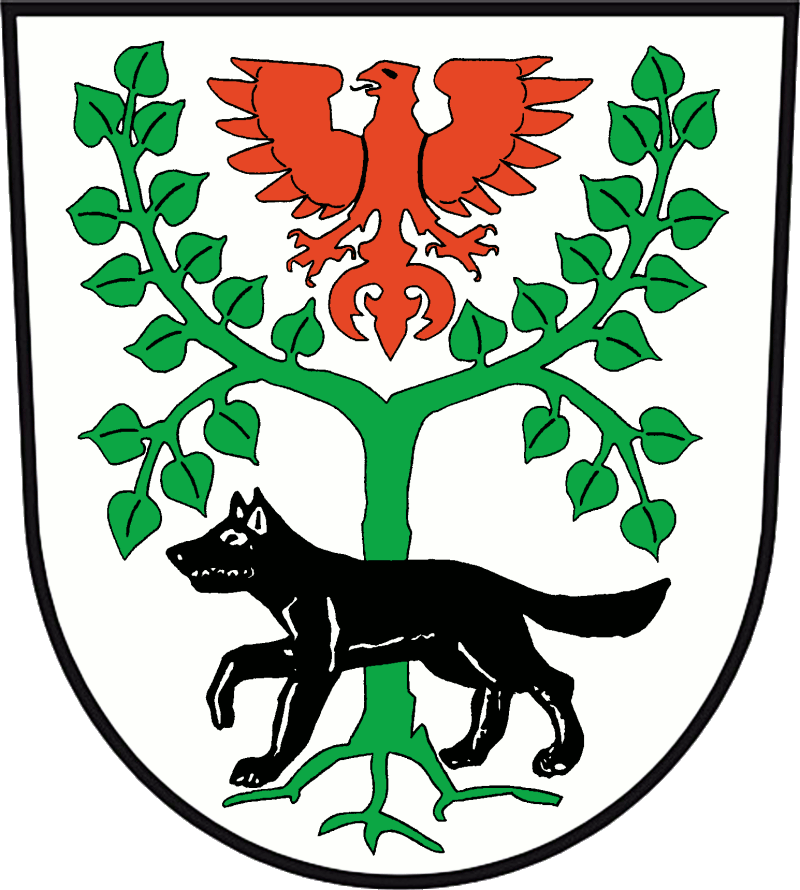
- Coat of arms

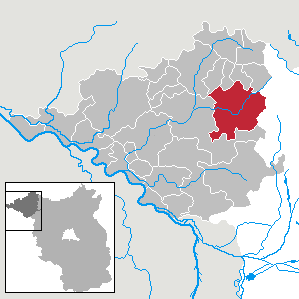
- Location of Pritzwalk within Prignitz district
- Interactive map of Pritzwalk
- Location within Germany Location within Brandenburg
- Coordinates: 53°09′N 12°11′E
- Country: Germany
- State: Brandenburg
- District: Prignitz

Government
  - Mayor (2017–25): Dr. Ronald Thiel

Area
  - Total: 167.47 km^{2} (64.66 sq mi)
- Elevation: 63 m (207 ft)

Population (2025-12-31)
  - Total: 11,801
  - Density: 70.466/km^{2} (182.51/sq mi)
- Time zone: UTC+01:00 (CET)
  - Summer (DST): UTC+02:00 (CEST)
- Postal codes: 16928
- Dialling codes: 03395
- Vehicle registration: PR (old: PK)
- Website: www.pritzwalk.de

Pritzwalk (German pronunciation: [ˈpʁɪtsˌvalk]) is a town in the district of Prignitz, in Brandenburg, Germany. It is situated 20 km west of Wittstock, and 33 km northeast of Wittenberge. The river Dömnitz flows through Pritzwalk.

== History ==
Pritzwalk obtained municipal status in 1256. From 1815 to 1945, Pritzwalk was part of the Prussian Province of Brandenburg. Nearly all the buildings in the town centre were destroyed by a fire in 1821. The Town Hall was built in a classicist style 1829. On 15 March 1945 many houses around the railway station were destroyed by a heavy explosion during an air raid when a munition train exploded after it had been hit by bombs. From 1952 to 1990, Pritzwalk was part of the Bezirk Potsdam of East Germany. In the fifties many new residential buildings were erected.

== Sights ==
Saint Nikolai Church was founded around 1250. In 1451 it was enlarged and transformed into a large gothic hall church. During the fire which destroyed most of the town in 1821 the church was heavily damaged. It was rebuilt in a neogothic style at the end of the 19th century. Its tower dating from 1882 has a height of 72 metres. The Town Hall was built in a classicist style 1829.

After the fire many houses were rebuilt in a traditional style. Several streets are worth a visit, e.g. Schützenstraße with its half-timbered houses. Many houses built in Art Nouveau or Gründerzeit style as well as buildings dating from the fifties were renovated after the reunification of Germany, e.g. in Hagenstraße. The Railway Station dates from 1955. The former railway station had been destroyed by a heavy explosion following an air raid in 1945.

The Library inaugurated in 1978 and the Kulturhaus (Cultural Centre), inaugurated in 1959 and named after Erich Weinert, a communist writer, represent the style of Socialist realism. The Library obtained the official title of a monument of Cultural heritage in 1999.

The old town centre is surrounded by parks and meadows which are remnants of a medieval defense system of moats and mounds. A part of the medieval wall, which was built in the 14th century, is left with a shottower in the northeast of the centre.

Many villages which were incorporated into Pritzwalk have old village churches worth a visit, e.g. Sarnow.

== Demography ==
Development of population since 1875 within the current Boundaries (Blue Line: Population; Dotted Line: Comparison to Population development in Brandenburg state; Grey Background: Time of Nazi Germany; Red Background: Time of communist East Germany)

Recent Population Development and Projections (Population Development before Census 2011 (blue line); Recent Population Development according to the Census in Germany in 2011 (blue bordered line); Official projections for 2005-2030 (yellow line); for 2017-2030 (scarlet line); for 2020-2030 (green line)

Pritzwalk: Population development
within the current boundaries (2020)

Year	Pop.	±% p.a.
1875	10,354	—
1890	10,949	+0.37%
1910	12,569	+0.69%
1925	13,085	+0.27%
1939	13,130	+0.02%
1950	16,766	+2.25%
1964	14,894	−0.84%

Year	Pop.	±% p.a.
1971	15,623	+0.68%
1981	16,236	+0.39%
1985	16,315	+0.12%
1990	15,995	−0.40%
1995	14,874	−1.44%
2000	14,309	−0.77%
2005	13,336	−1.40%

Year	Pop.	±% p.a.
2010	12,598	−1.13%
2015	11,922	−1.10%
2016	12,050	+1.07%
2017	12,009	−0.34%
2018	11,924	−0.71%
2019	11,879	−0.38%
2020	11,870	−0.08%

== International relations ==
=== Twin towns — Sister cities ===
Pritzwalk is twinned with:

- Winsen, Germany

== Sons and daughters of the town ==
- Heinrich Gätke (1814–1897), ornithologist

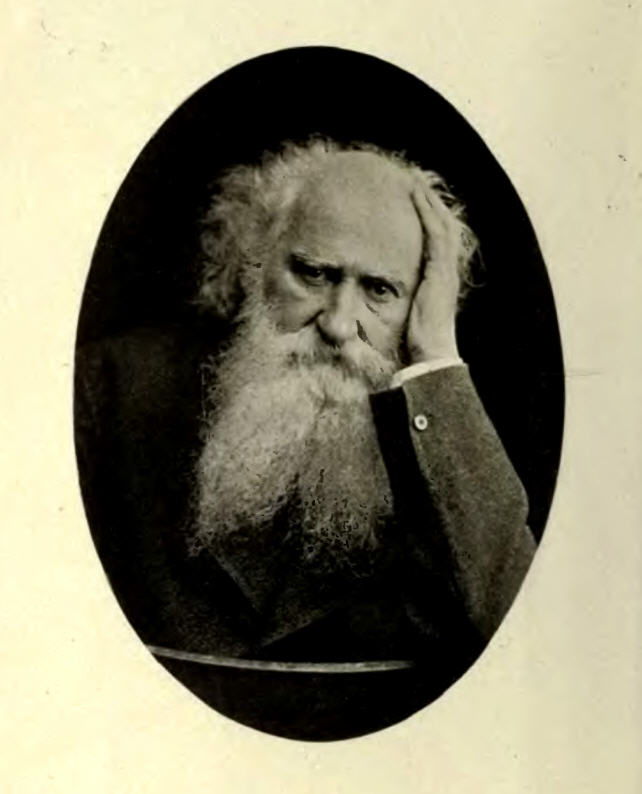
Heinrich Gaetke 1895

- Hermann von Grauert (1850–1924), historian
- Franz John (1872–1952), first president of FC Bayern Munich
- Günther Quandt (1881–1954), industrialist and Wehrwirtschaftsführer

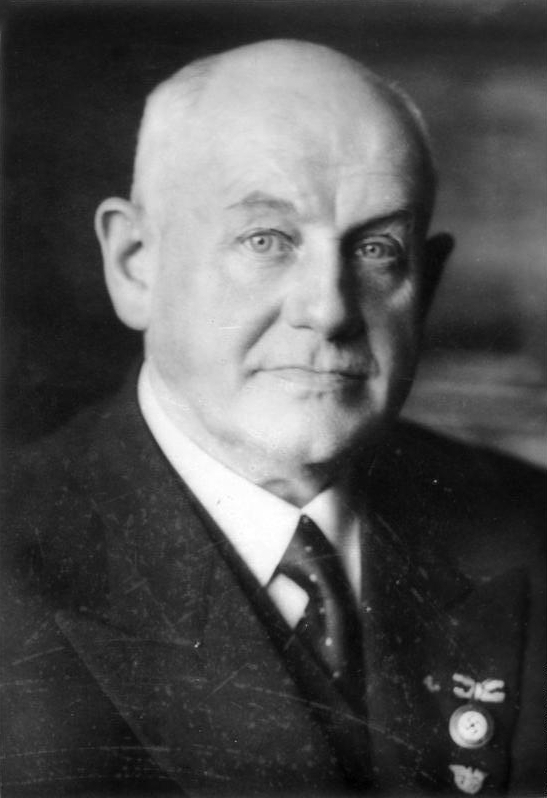
Günther Quandt, 1941 Wehrwirtschaftsführer

- Walter Granzow (1887–1952), Minister-president of Mecklenburg-Schwerin; president of the Deutsche Rentenbank
- Ernst-Günther Baade (1897–1945), Generalleutnant of the Wehrmacht,
- Herbert Quandt (1910–1982), industrialist
- Liane Buhr (born 1956), rower
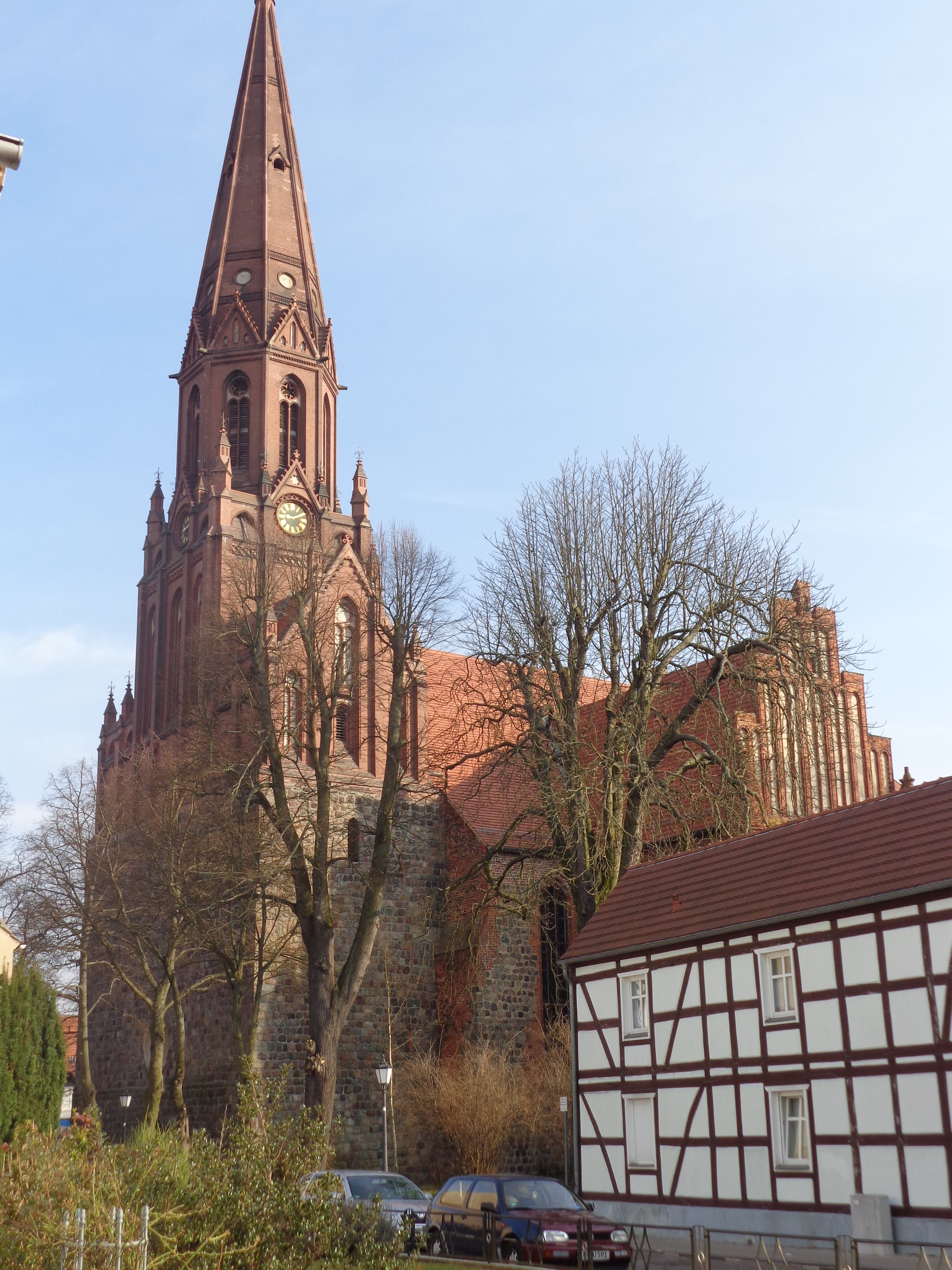
Saint Nikolai Church

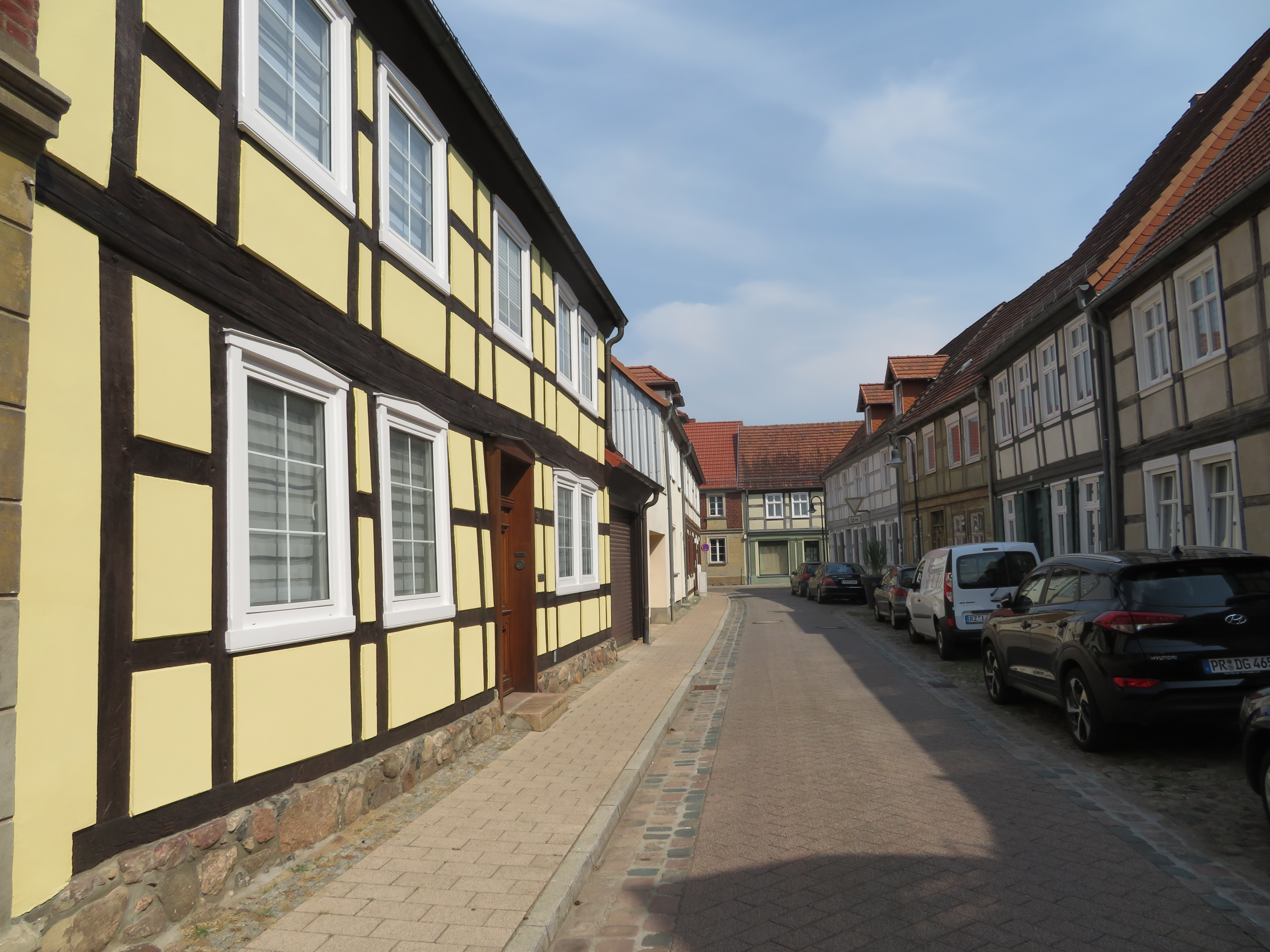
Half-timbered houses in Schützenstraße

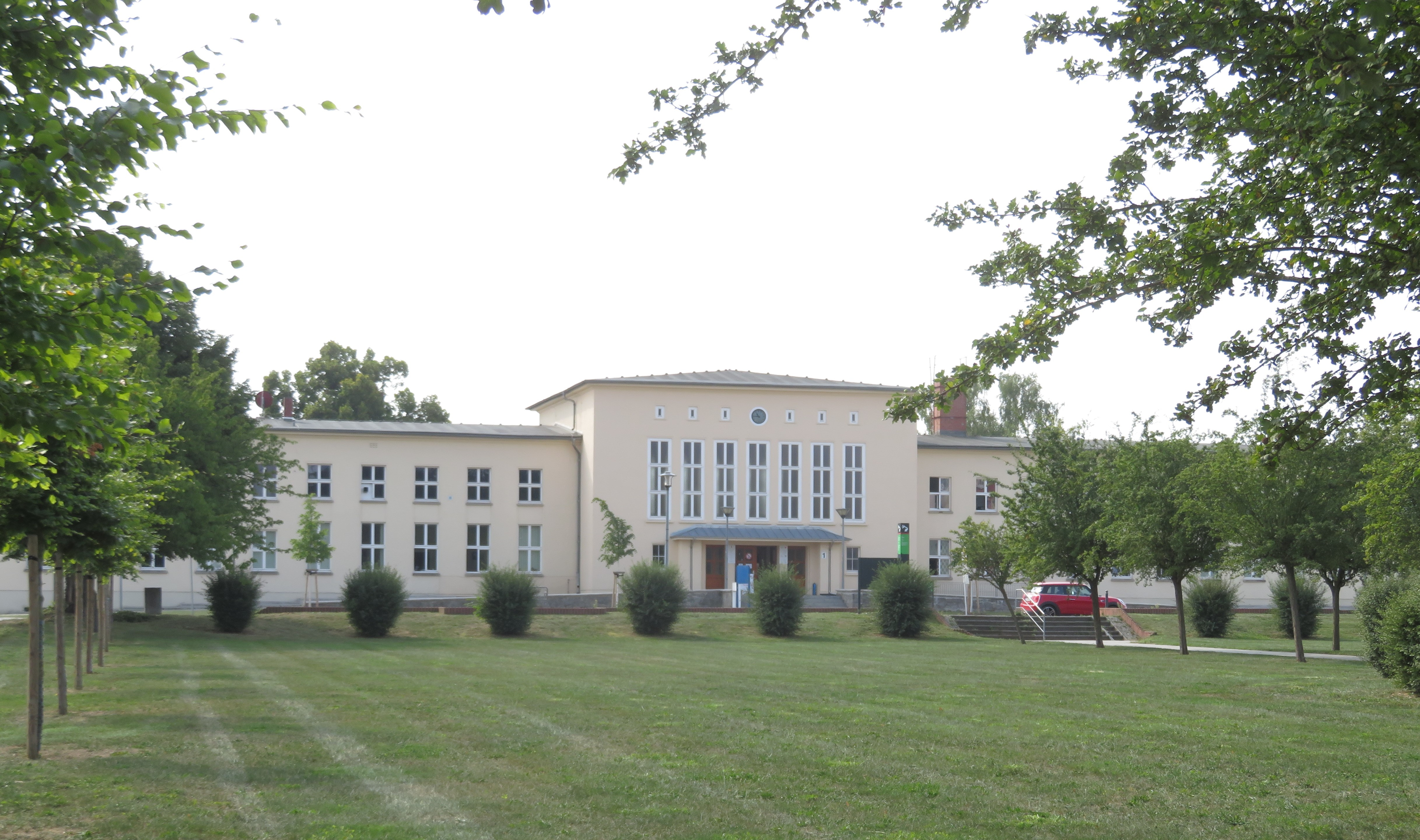
Railway Station

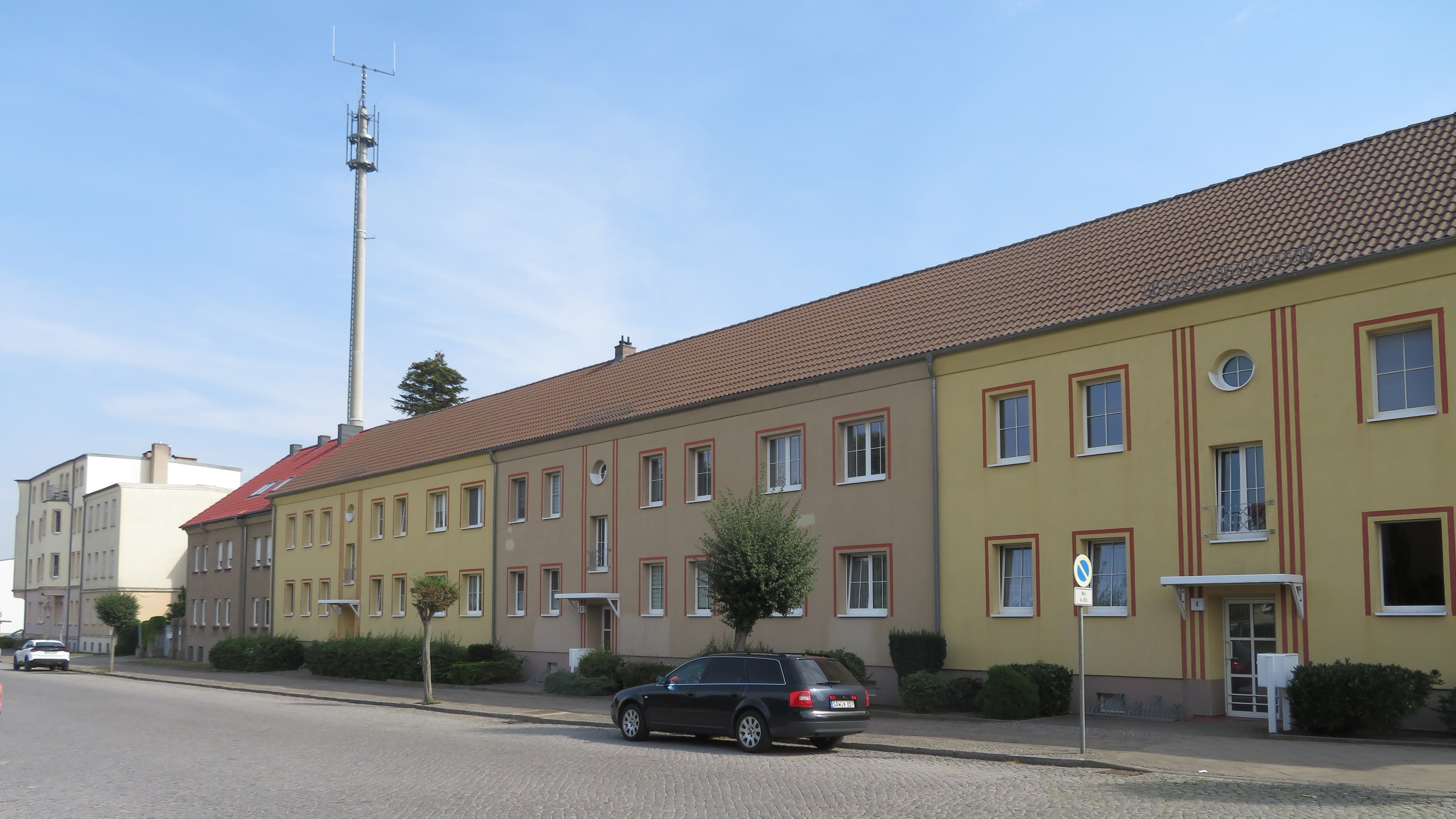
Architecture of the fifties beside the railway station

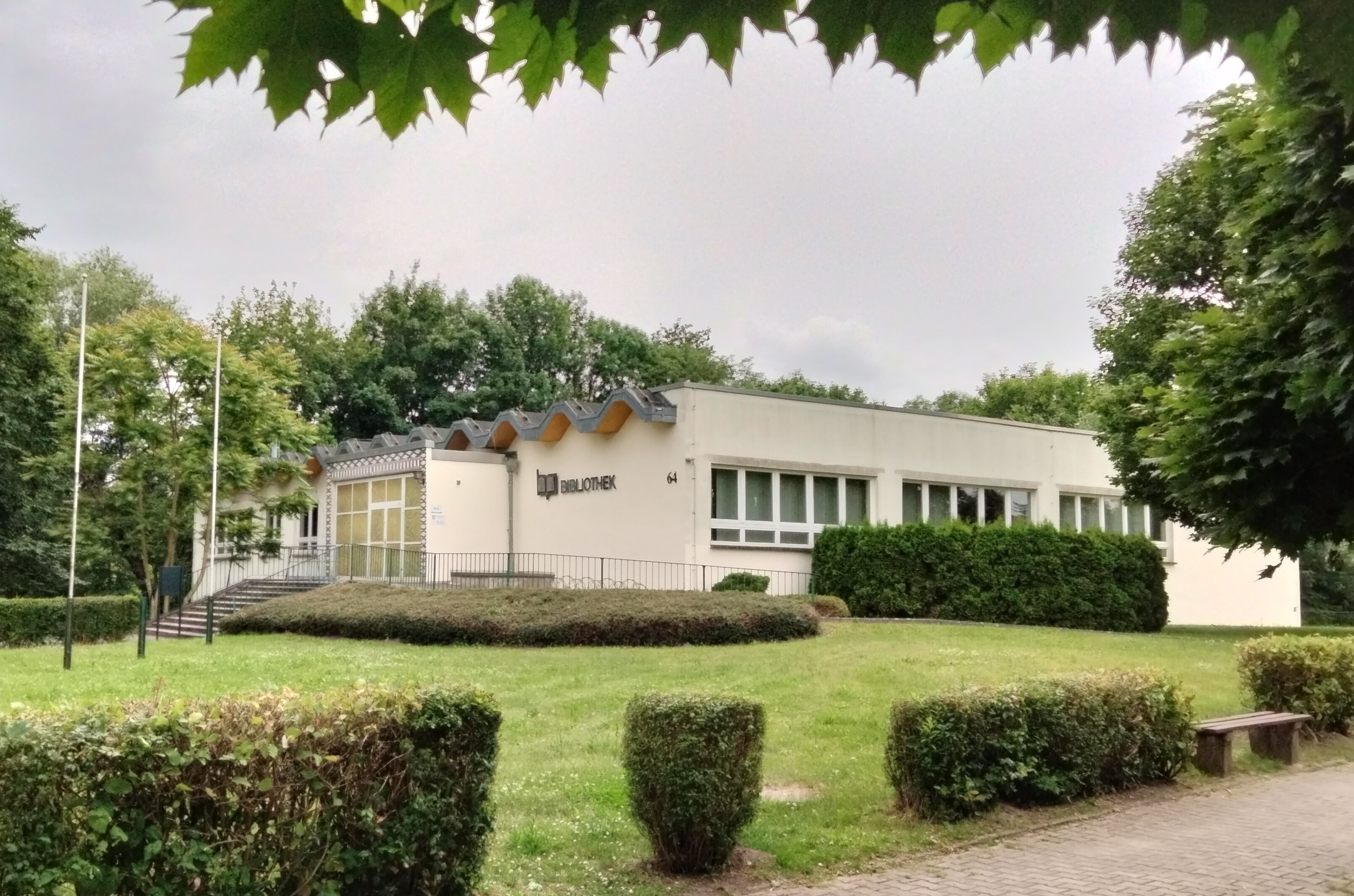
Library

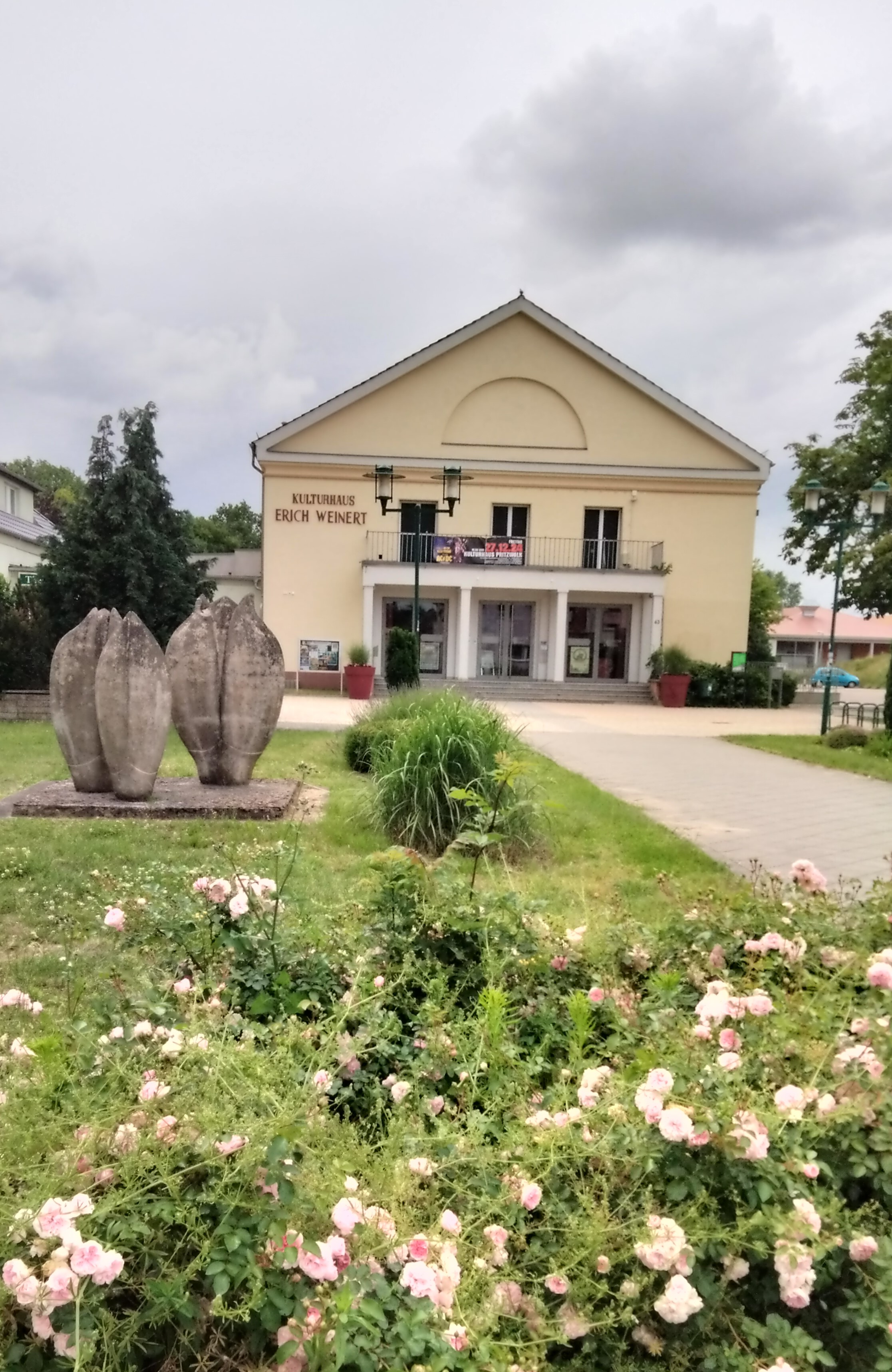
Kulturhaus Erich Weinert

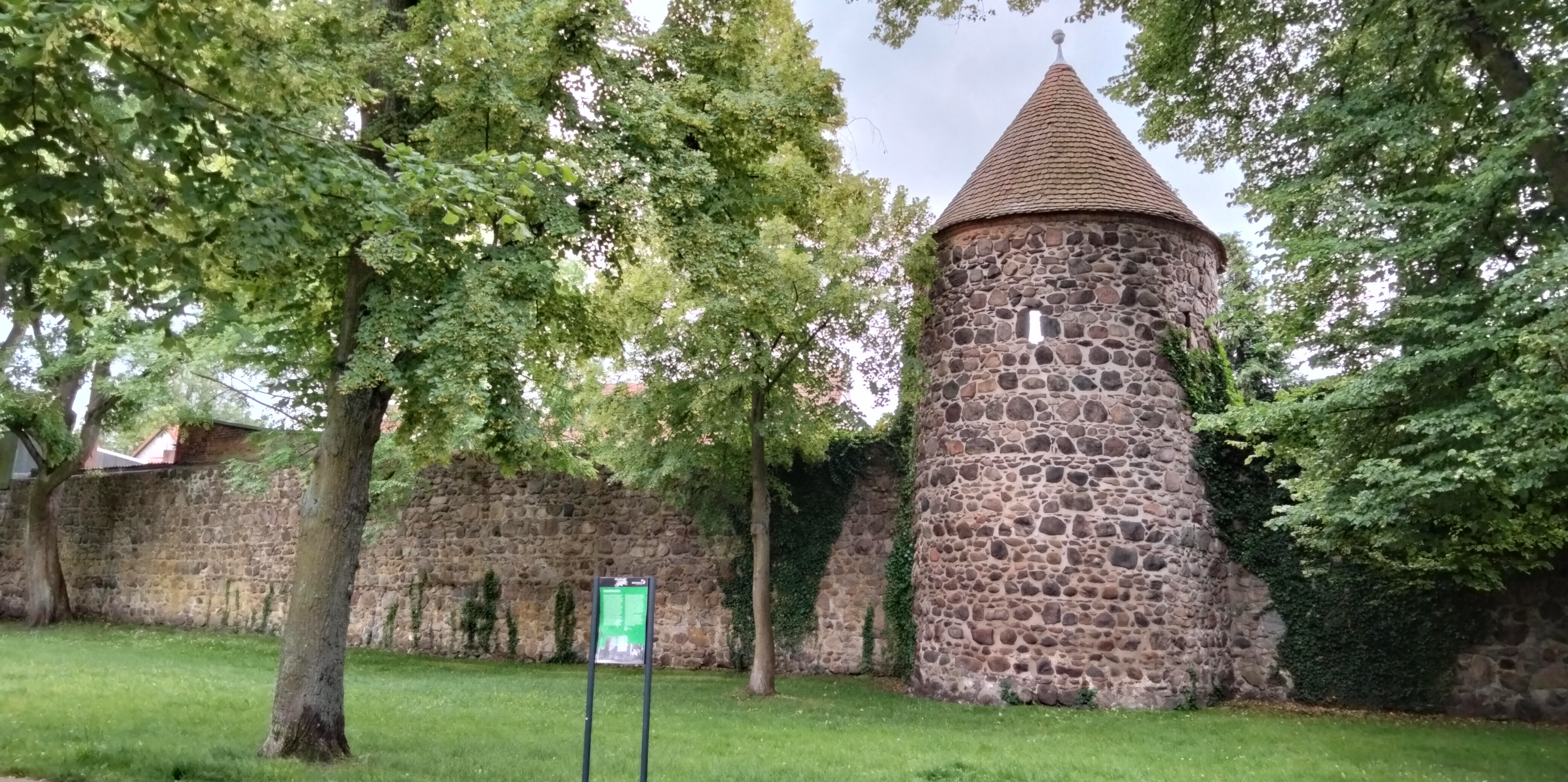
Medieval town wall with shot tower

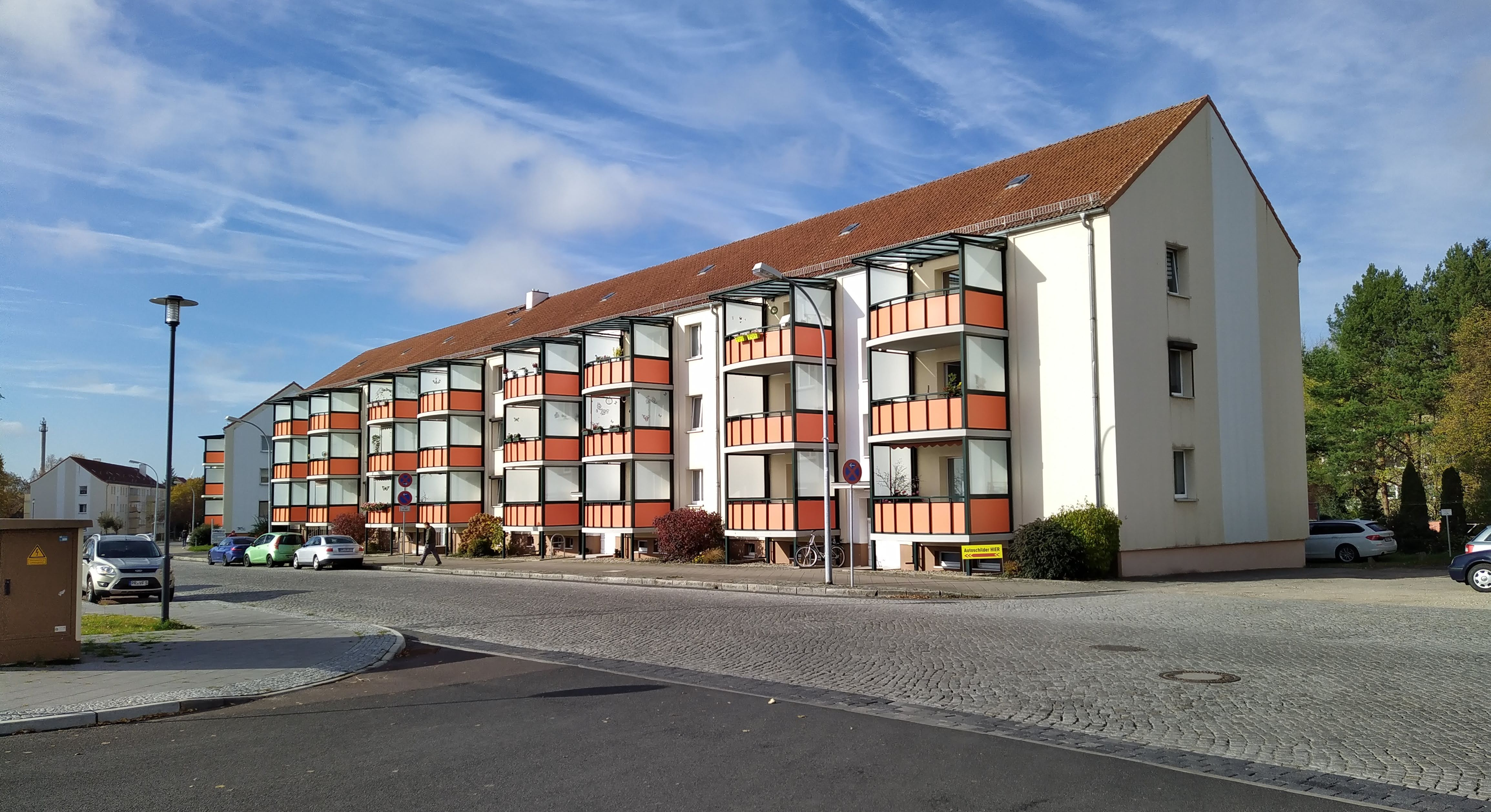
Architecture of the fifties opposite the station

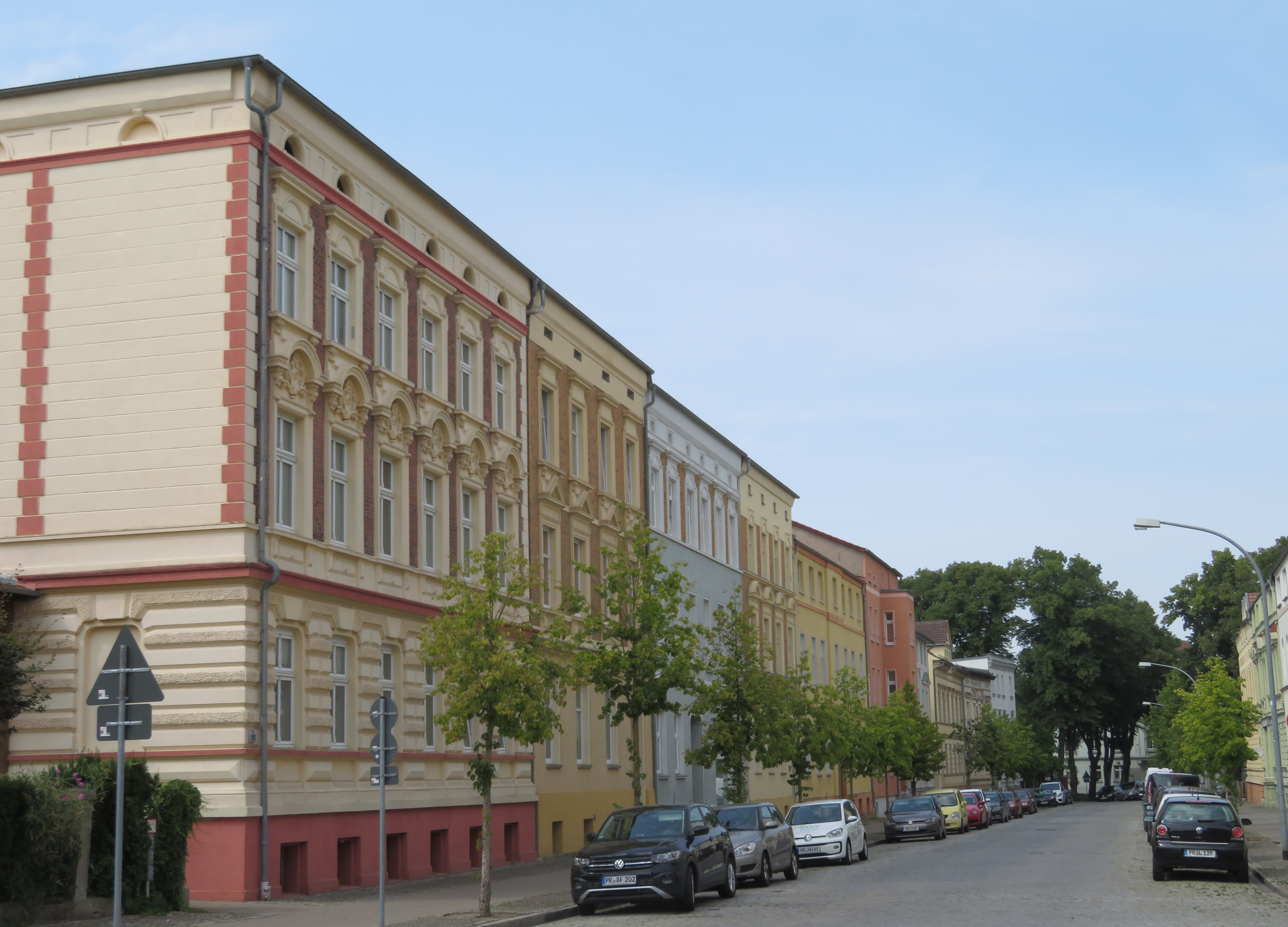
Art nouveau in Hagenstraße

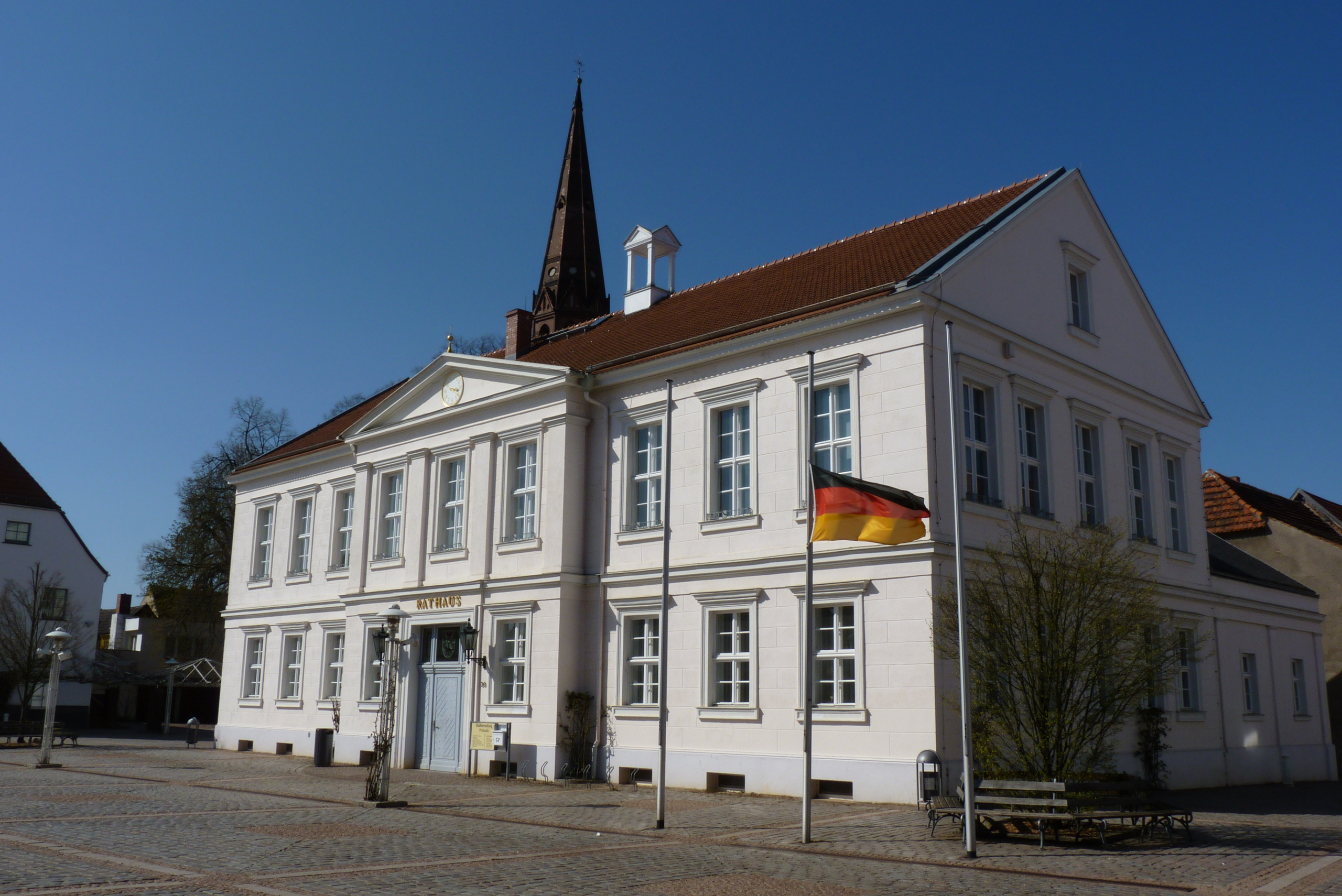
Town Hall
