= Wittenberge =

- Town
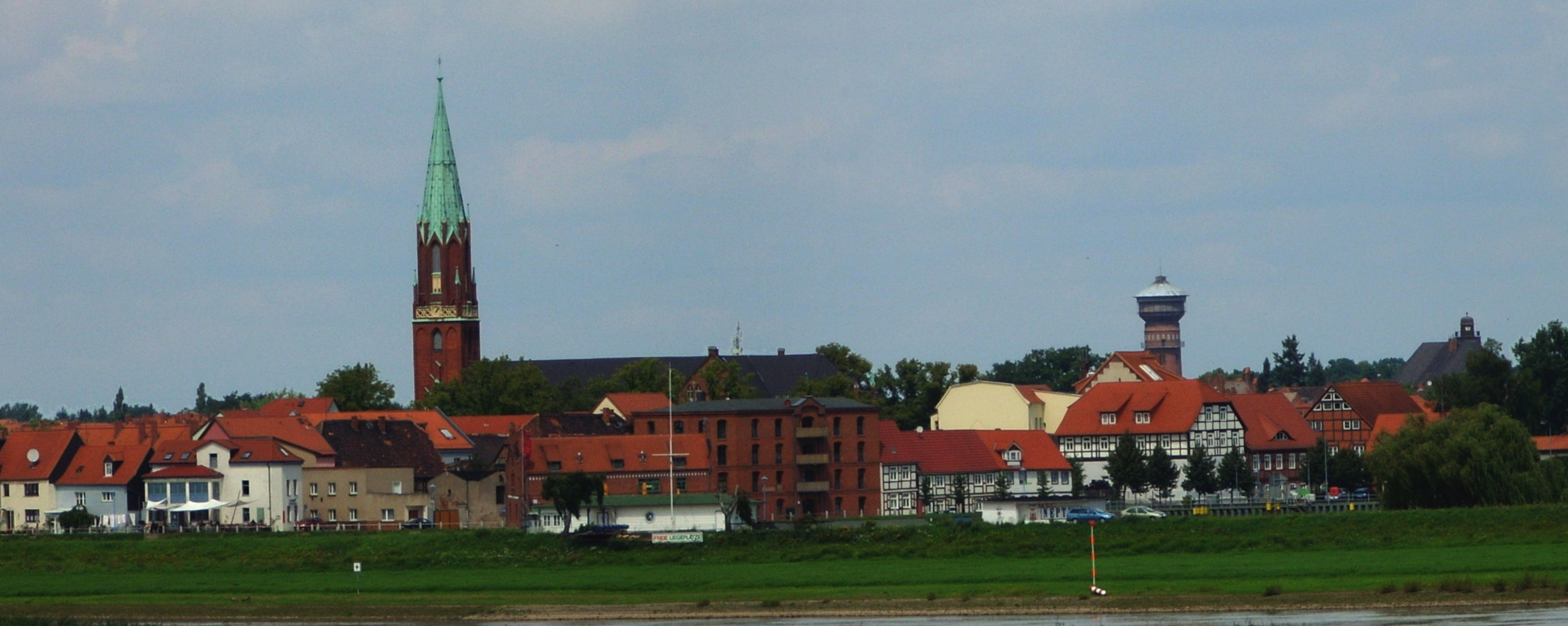

- Flag Coat of arms

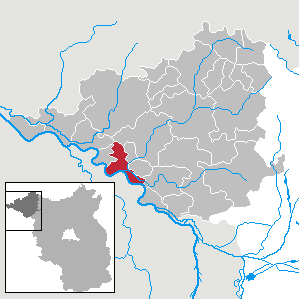
- Location of Wittenberge within Prignitz district
- Interactive map of Wittenberge
- Location within Germany Location within Brandenburg
- Coordinates: 53°00′N 11°45′E
- Country: Germany
- State: Brandenburg
- District: Prignitz
- Subdivisions: 7 Stadtteile/Stadtbezirke

Government
  - Mayor (2024–32): Oliver Hermann (SPD)

Area
  - Total: 50.63 km^{2} (19.55 sq mi)
- Elevation: 25 m (82 ft)

Population (2025-12-31)
  - Total: 16,928
  - Density: 334.3/km^{2} (866.0/sq mi)
- Time zone: UTC+01:00 (CET)
  - Summer (DST): UTC+02:00 (CEST)
- Postal codes: 19322
- Dialling codes: 03877
- Vehicle registration: PR
- Website: www.wittenberge.de

Wittenberge (German pronunciation: [vɪtn̩ˈbɛʁɡə]) is a town of eighteen thousand people on the middle Elbe in the district of Prignitz, Brandenburg, in northern Germany.

== Geography ==
Wittenberge is situated at the right (north-eastern) bank of the middle Elbe at its confluence with the Stepenitz and Karthane in the German district of Prignitz. Within the same district, the town borders the Ämter Lenzen-Elbtalaue and Bad Wilsnack/Weisen as well as the district capital Perleberg. The Verbandsgemeinde Seehausen (Altmark) in the district of Stendal, Saxony-Anhalt, lies on the opposite side of the Elbe.

== History ==
Early-20th-century view of the town

The site was marked out in 1239 at Wendischwalde and in 1300 the Saxon king, Otto I, established the settlement. The exact date when Wittenberge attained municipal status is unknown. The oldest document in which Wittenberge is mentioned as a "town" dates from 22 July 1300. Wittenberge grew slowly but steadily. The town castle (1669) survives as the town museum but it suffered fires in 1686 and 1757, and floods from the Elbe in 1709 and 1761. Nevertheless, because of its position, it prospered from the opening of the Berlin–Hamburg steamship traffic. By 1823 milling, processing and refining of foodstuffs were important industries. In 1846 the railway came and a silk factory was built, followed by a chemical factory in 1849. The Reichsbahn railway workshops were established in 1875 and the world-famous Singer Sewing Machine Company opened in 1903 its German manufacturing site Singer Nähmaschinenfabrik Wittenberge. By 1914 the town hall was built.

During World War II, as early as 1940, foreign civilian laborers and prisoners of war were brought to forced labour at a local factory of synthetic celluloid wool. From February 1942, Jews from German-occupied Poland were also subjected to forced labour at the factory, and in August 1942, the first subcamp of the Neuengamme concentration camp was established there, whose prisoners were Soviets, Poles, Dutch, Belgians, and Danes. The prisoners were also exploited at construction sites, in other production plants, in transport, in cleaning up after Allied air raids, in detonating bombs and in putting out fires. The forced labour camp for Jews and the subcamp of Neuengamme were dissolved in June 1943 and February 1945, respectively. In April 1945, a death march of prisoners of a subcamp of the Mittelbau-Dora concentration camp in Kelbra passed through the town. During the war Wittenberge suffered severe destruction by five air raids and 216 civilians died.

Between the wars much architecture characteristic of the period was built in the form of workers' housing for the rapidly increased population. Only the railway workshops remain as significant employers of the old industries but the large, skilled workforce remains for the newer industries of precision engineering and applied chemistry.

== Sights ==
The oldest building in Wittenberge is Steintor (stone Gate) dating from 1450, an ancient gate of the medieval city wall. Only a small part of Wittenberge's old town centre with half-timbered houses is left as many old houses were torn down before 1989. The railway station was built in a classicist style in 1846 and rebuilt after considerable bomb damage in World War II. The Town Hall (Rathaus) with its tower measuring 51 metres was inaugurated in 1914. It represents the style of Gründerzeit.

The Kultur- und Festspielhaus, a cultural centre, was built in 1959 in a typical style of Socialist realism. After the German reunification it was renovated in reinaugurated in 1999. It is situated at Paul-Lincke-Platz, a place which is named after the composer Paul Lincke who lived in Wittenberge from 1881 to 1884. In Bahnstraße, Wittenberge's main street, several residential buildings representing Stalinist architecture on a provincial level can be seen close to the Cultural Centre. They were renovated after the German reunification.

A factory for producing sewing-machines was founded in Wittenberge in 1903. Its clock tower measuring 49 metres which was built in 1928 is one of the symbols of Wittenberge.

== Demography ==
Development of population since 1875 within the current Boundaries (Blue Line: Population; Dotted Line: Comparison to Population development in Brandenburg state; Grey Background: Time of Nazi Germany; Red Background: Time of communist East Germany)

Recent Population Development and Projections (Population Development before Census 2011 (blue line); Recent Population Development according to the Census in Germany in 2011 (blue bordered line); Official projections for 2005-2030 (yellow line); for 2017-2030 (scarlet line); for 2020-2030 (green line)

Wittenberge: Population development
within the current boundaries (2020)

Year	Pop.	±% p.a.
1875	8,407	—
1890	13,294	+3.10%
1910	21,262	+2.38%
1925	26,310	+1.43%
1939	28,496	+0.57%
1950	32,166	+1.11%
1964	33,021	+0.19%

Year	Pop.	±% p.a.
1971	33,704	+0.29%
1981	31,765	−0.59%
1985	30,757	−0.80%
1990	28,378	−1.60%
1995	24,890	−2.59%
2000	22,163	−2.29%
2005	19,767	−2.26%

Year	Pop.	±% p.a.
2010	18,571	−1.24%
2015	17,206	−1.52%
2016	17,318	+0.65%
2017	17,201	−0.68%
2018	17,015	−1.08%
2019	16,925	−0.53%
2020	16,862	−0.37%

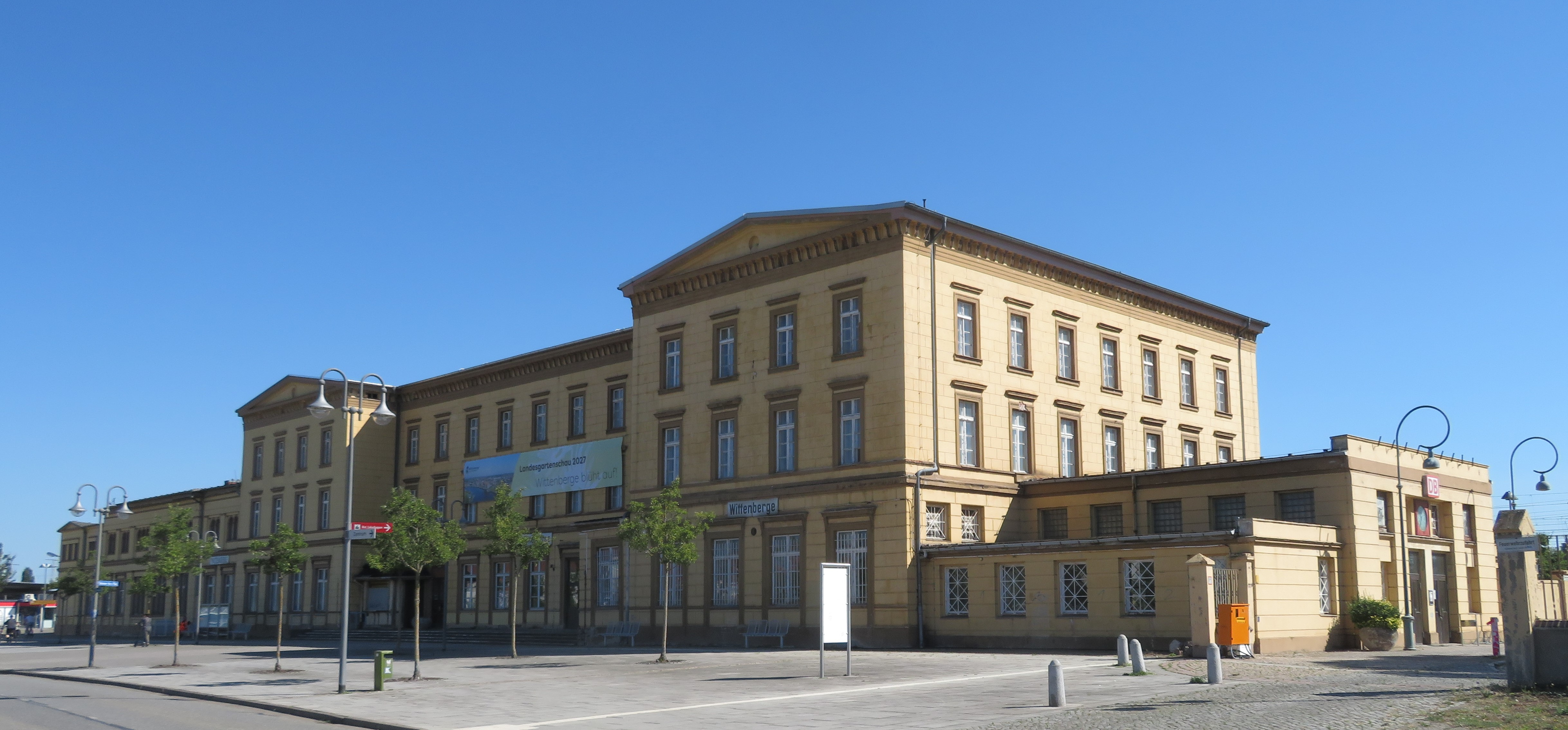
Railway station

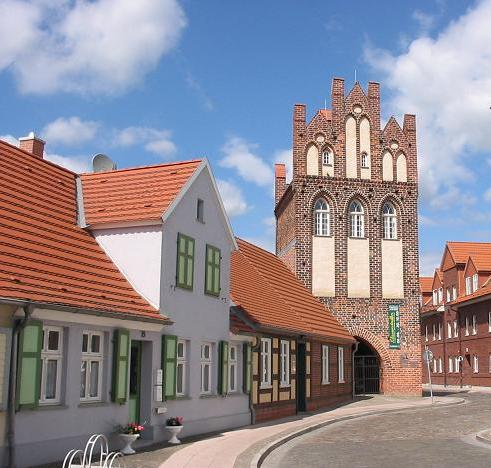
Steintor (Stone Gate)

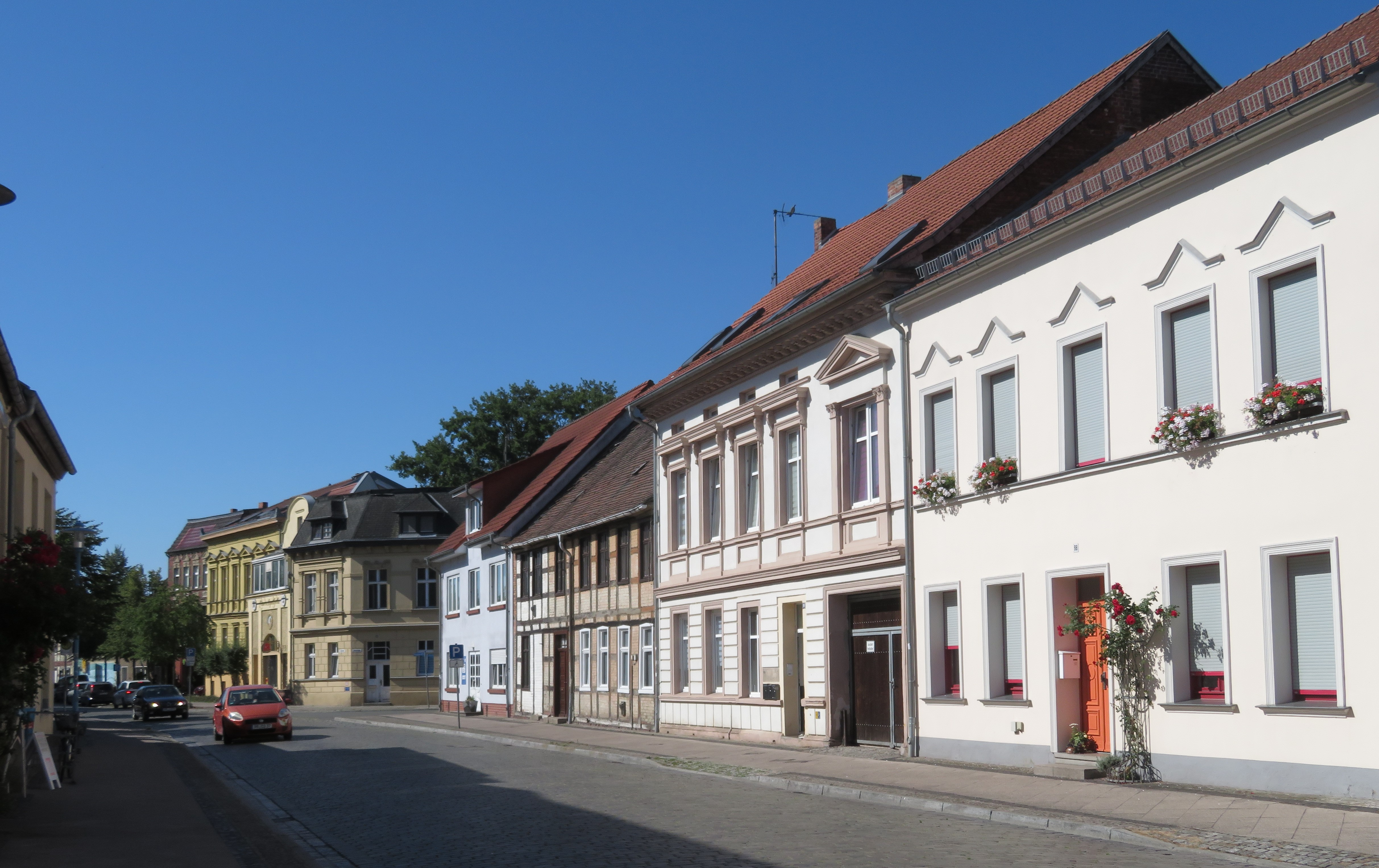
Old town centre

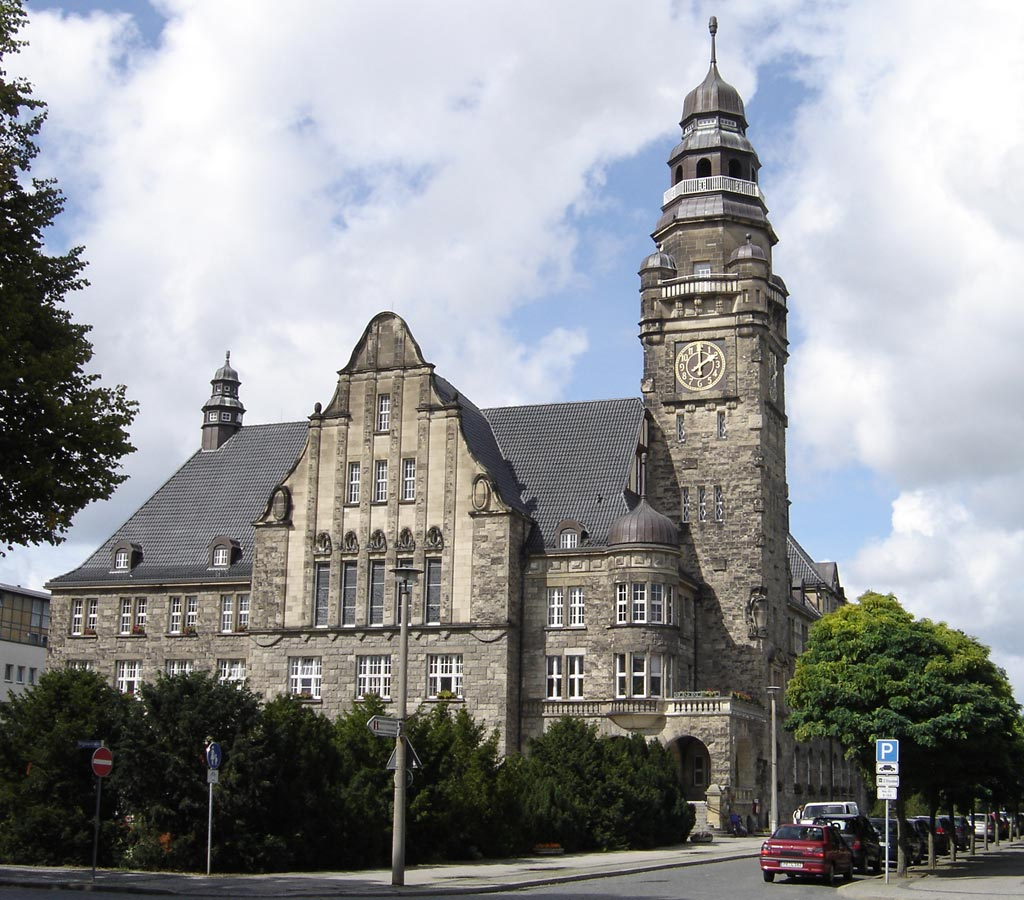
Town Hall

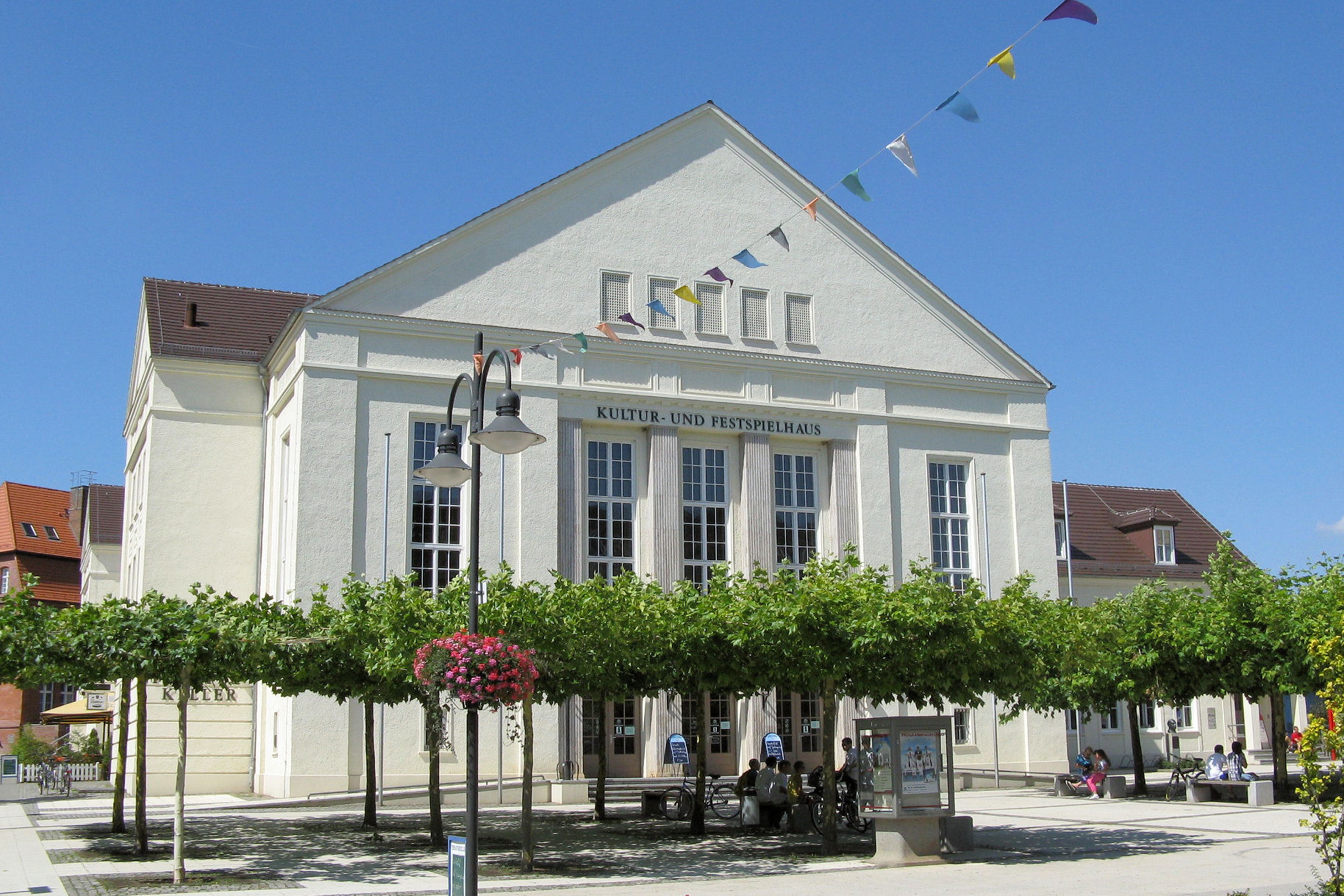
Cultural Centre

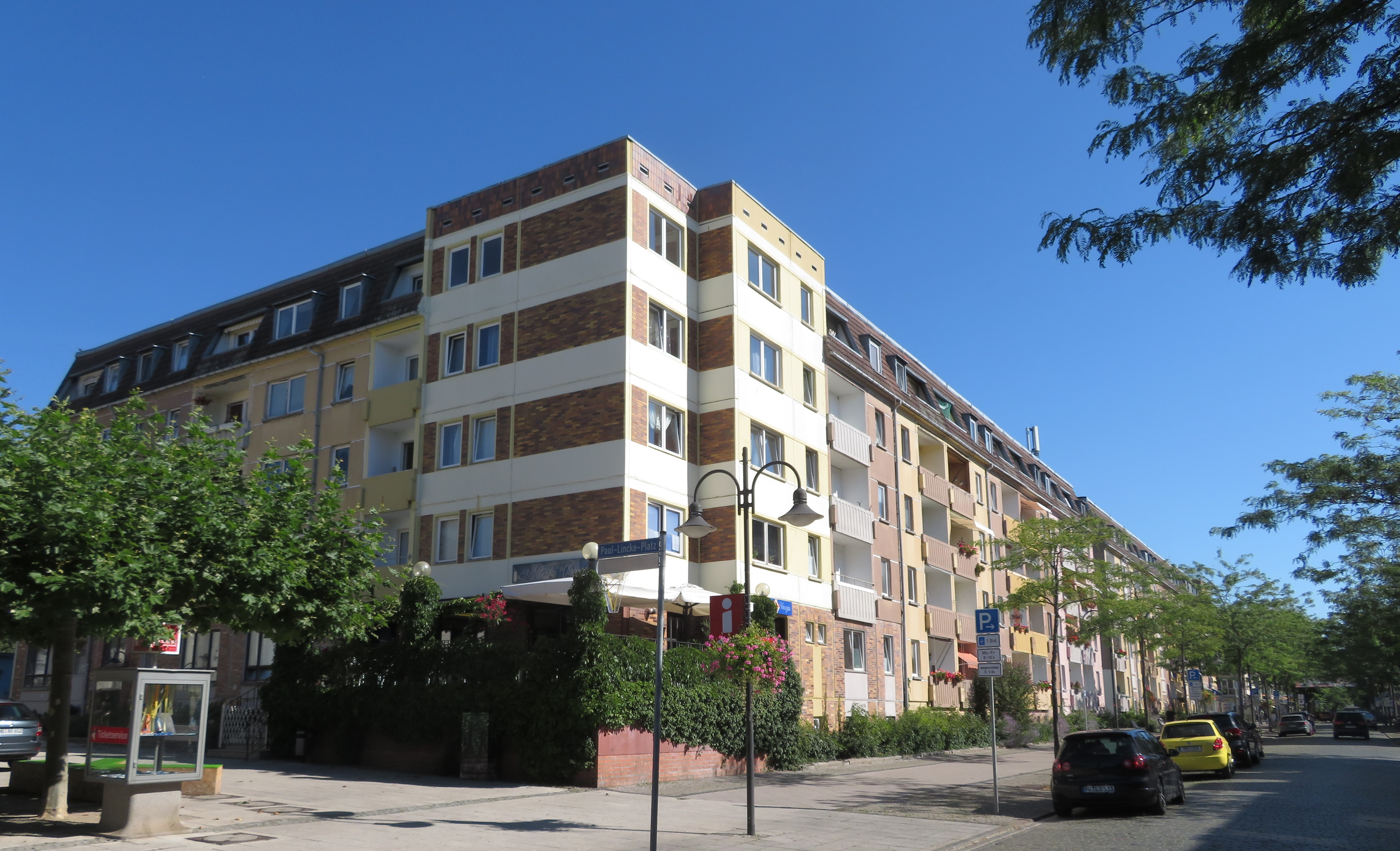
Socialist architecture in Bahnstraße after its renovation

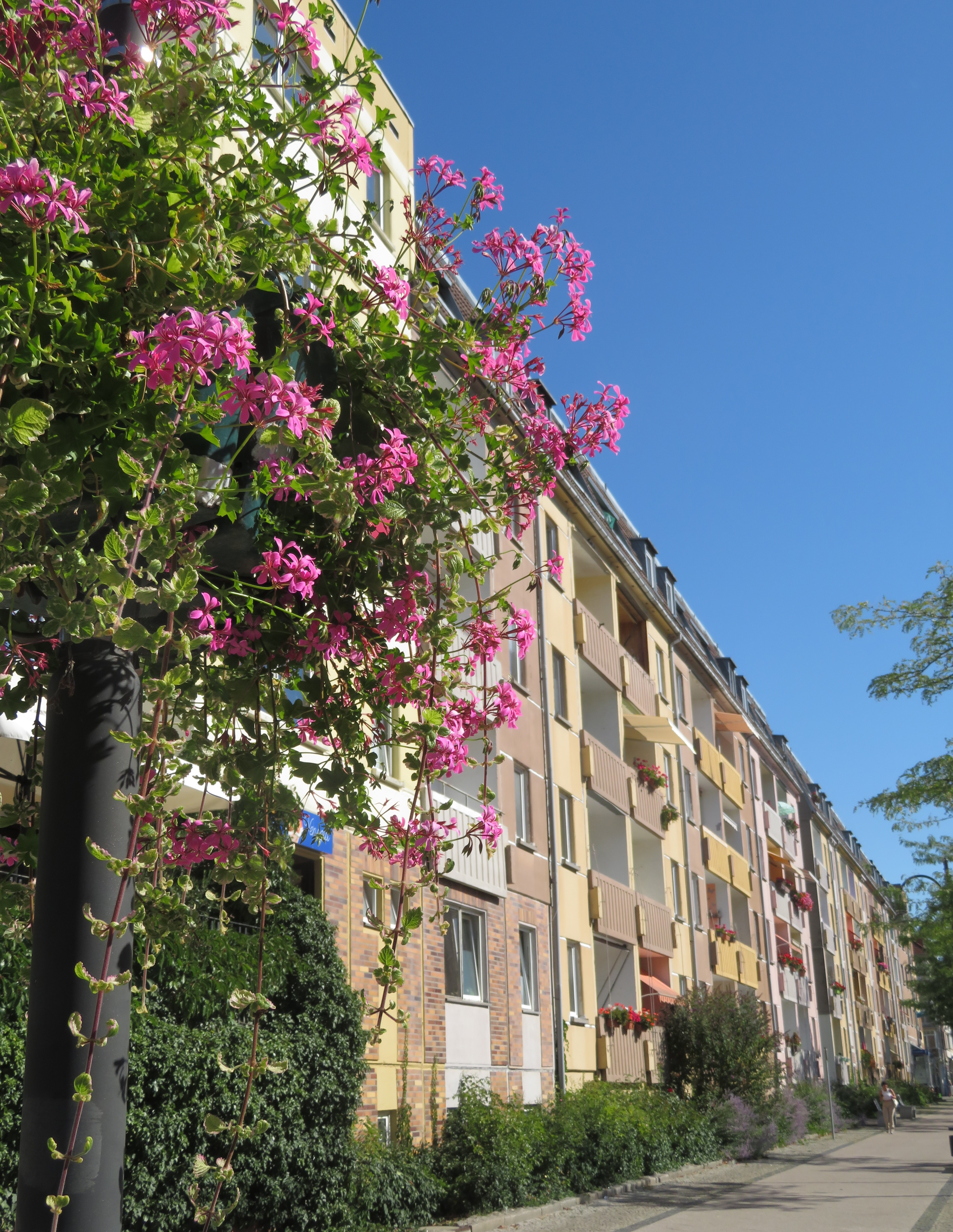
Socialist architecture in Bahnstraße after its renovation

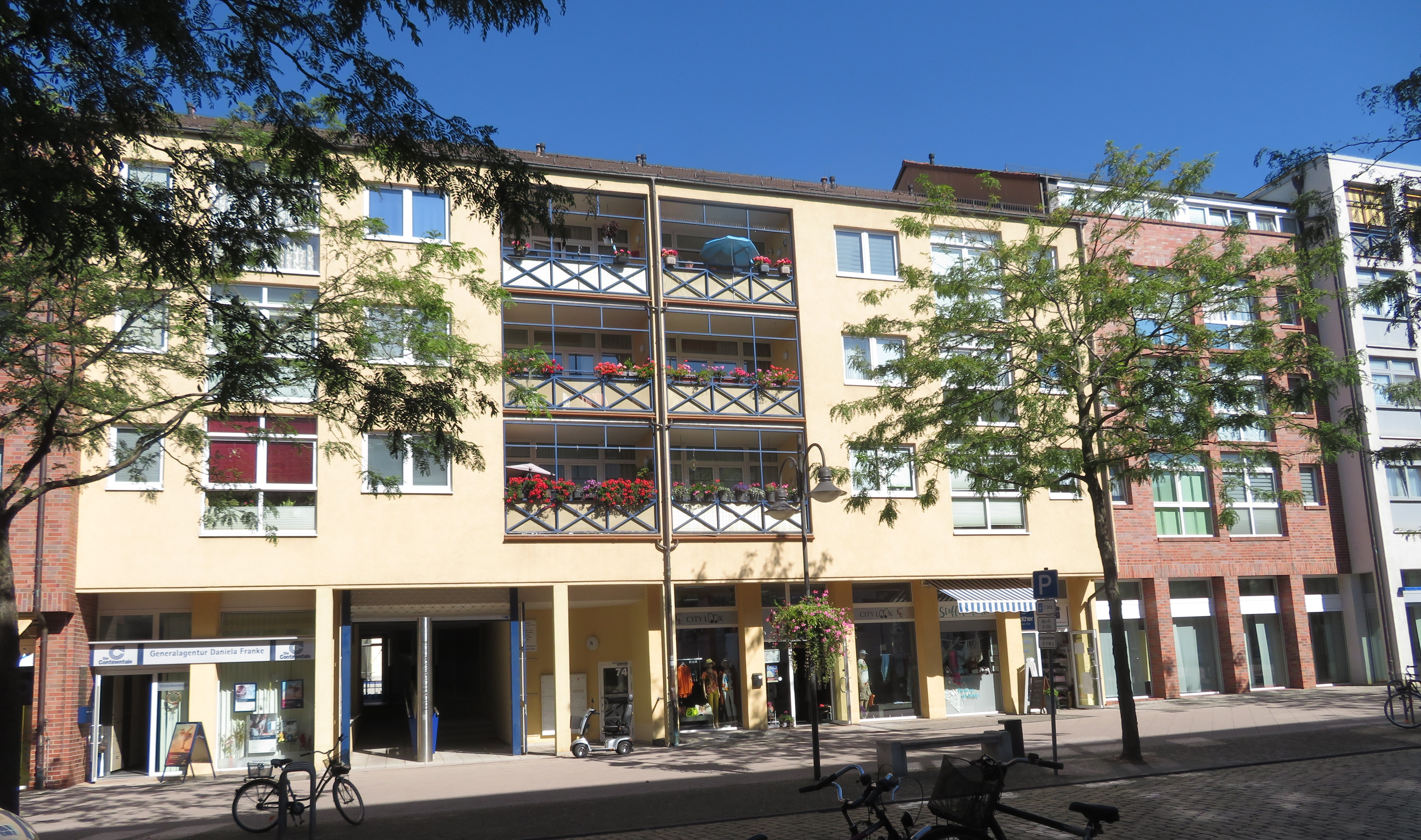
Wittenberge's main street: Bahnstraße

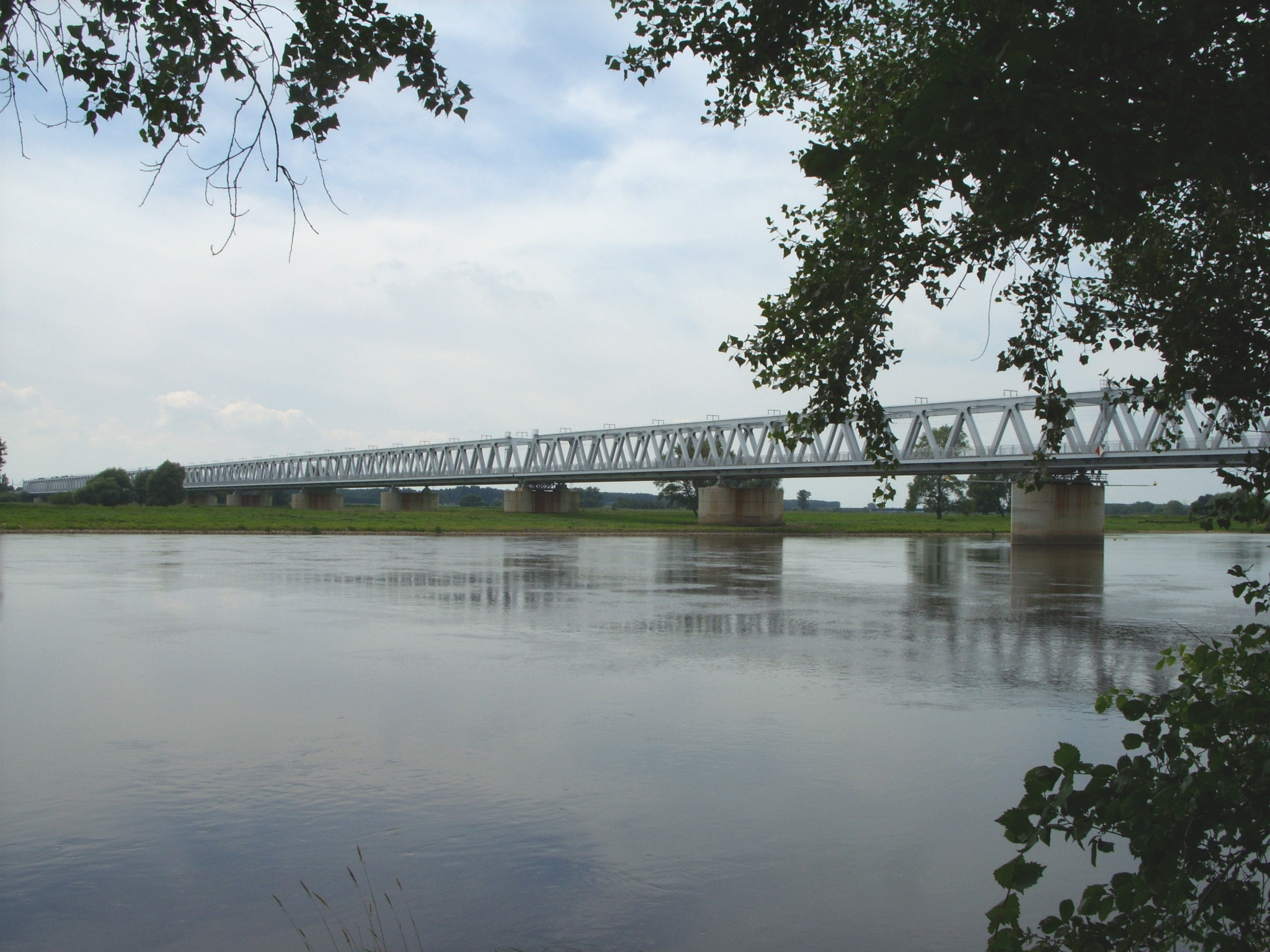
Railway bridge over the Elbe near Wittenberge

== Mayor ==
- 1993–2008: Klaus Petry (SPD)
- since 2008: Oliver Hermann (independent)

Oliver Hermann was reelected in 2016 with 94,8% of the vote.

== International relations ==
=== Twin towns – Sister cities ===
Wittenberge is twinned with:

- Châlons-en-Champagne, France
- Elmshorn, Germany
- Razgrad, Bulgaria

== Notable people ==
- Friedrich Burmeister (1888–1968), politician of the GDR (Minister of mail and telecommunications)
- Klaus Havenstein (1922–1998), German actor and cabaret artist
- Emanuel Hirsch (1888–1972), Protestant theologian
- Norbert Klaar (born 1954), sports shooter, Olympic champion 1976 (fast fire pistol)
- Richard Kruspe (born 1967), musician, guitarist of the band Rammstein
- Carl Lindenberg (1850–1928), jurist and philatelist
- Ulrich Makosch (1933–2008), journalist (television of the GDR)
- Uwe Potteck (born 1955), sportsman, Olympic champion 1976 (free pistol)
- Friedrich Schorlemmer (born 1944), theologian
- Herman C. Schultz (born 1860), politician
- Otto Telschow (1876–1945), politician of the NSDAP, Gauleiter, member of the Reichstag
- Stefanie Thurmann (born 1982), sports shooter
- Ulrich Woronowicz (1928–2011), Protestant pastor, theologian and social activist
