= Krampfer Palace =

Coordinates: 53.060386°N 12.016703°E

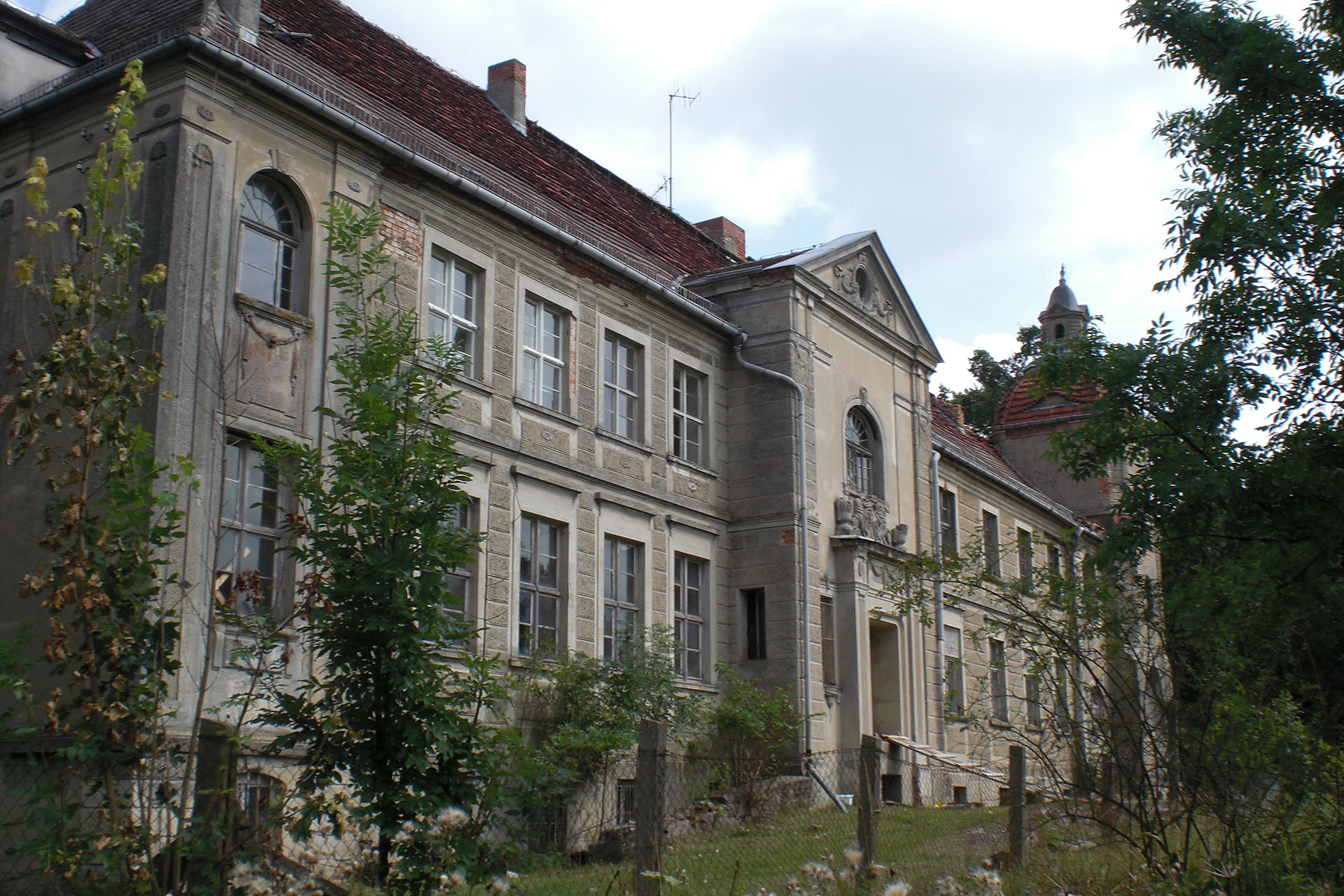
- Interactive map of the Krampfer Palace area

General information
- Type: House
- Location: Brandenburg, Germany

Krampfer Palace (German: Schloß Krampfer) is 18th-century palace located in the village of Krampfer in the municipality of Plattenburg, near Perleberg, Prignitz district, Brandenburg, Germany. The palace estate covers approximately 4,700 acres (19 km^{2}). There have been a number of spelling variations for Krampfer over the years, including Cramuir, Kranauer, Cramber, tu Kramvyr, van Kraenvoerde and Kranffer.

== History ==
Herwichus de Cramvir first documented the existence of Krampfer in 1293. In 1413, the village of Krampfer was captured by the Möllendorf family, who ruled it until 1945 when it was removed from their control. In 1608, the village of Krampfer burned to the ground. In the seventeenth century the estate was acquired by Georg von Blumenthal and it remained in this family until his line died out. In 1792, the palace was acquired by Hans-Georg Gottlob von Möllendorf, who remodelled it in 1809. It was again remodeled in 1909 by Ottocar Richard von Möllendorf. After the estate was expropriated, the palace and the commercial building on it were used by the community agricultural alliance, German: Landwirtschaftliche Produktionsgenossenschaft.

In 1946, half the palace was renovated and used as a school and the other half for housing. In September 1978, the school moved to Kleinow. After this many businesses operated in the former palace including a bank, a nursery and a community health-care center. After 1990, the building was virtually abandoned; a potential customer announced his intention of buying it in 2006, but the deal fell through.

The association which owned the palace hoped it would be sold to an IT company for educational purposes, but there were no takers. Later, the palace was then sold to a company in Havelberg which in turn auctioned it on eBay. In 2009, the premises were briefly used by a group of right-wing and libertarian activists who were seeking to establish a micronation called Principality of Germania. However, local building authorities declared the palace to be in a state of disrepair and uninhabitable, and the activists were evicted in May 2009. As of 2021, the building is still abandoned and dilapidated, however in 2020 plans were made by private investors to restore the palace.

== Layout ==
The courtyard at the rear of the palace, the front garden and the area stretching to the street were once part of the estate. Across the street stood the estate's brick barn. To the left of the barn was a stone building which housed sheep; its gable pointed towards the street. Only their remains can still be seen. Beyond the farm was a garden center. To the right of the palace is a storage building, and behind that the servants' quarters (still used as a residence). Behind the palace was a large park with a pond, which was established in 1880 covering about 4 acres (16,000 m^{2}); it was extended in 1910.

In the park are a wide variety of trees. Up to the present-day village street, the estate was fenced in by a high cobbled wall. This, along with the estate's barn, was demolished in 1947 and the rubble used to build up the residential housing area. There was a utility yard located across from the palace, on the other side of the street.
