= Charles Arnold-Baker =

English member of MI6, barrister and historian

Charles Arnold-Baker OBE
- Born: Wolfgang Charles Werner von Blumenthal; 25 June 1918; Berlin, German Empire
- Died: 6 June 2009 (aged 90); London, England
- Occupations: Member of MI6, barrister, academic, and historian
- Spouse: Edith May
- Children: Two
- Awards: Officer of the Order of the British Empire, King Haakon VII Medal of Freedom

Academic background
- Education: Winchester College
- Alma mater: Magdalen College, Oxford

Academic work
- Notable works: Companion to British History

Charles Arnold-Baker, OBE (born Wolfgang Charles Werner von Blumenthal; 25 June 1918 – 6 June 2009) was an English member of MI6, barrister (called 1948) and historian. He was the author of the Companion to British History. He was awarded an OBE (1966) and the King Haakon VII Medal of Freedom (1945).

== Background ==
Charles Arnold-Baker was the son of Professor Baron Albrecht Werner von Blumenthal (10 August 1889, Staffelde, by Stettin, Prussia – 28 March 1945, Marburg an der Lahn), of Gross Schloenwitz by Stolp, Pomerania, by his first wife, an English lady, Wilhelmine, née Hainsworth (1883–1978), and stepson of Percival Richard Arnold-Baker. His parents divorced in 1921; his mother returned to England and was remarried, in 1923, to Percy Arnold-Baker, (1875–1944), brother of Sir Frederick Arnold-Baker.) He was born in the Charité Hospital, Berlin, of which his ancestor Johann Christian Theden had been Surgeon-General, in 1918 and died in 2009, having been received into the Roman Catholic Church on his deathbed. His ashes were interred, however, in the triforium of the Temple Church, London.

Wolfgang Charles Werner was educated at Winchester College and Magdalen College, Oxford (BA History 1940). As World War II approached Charles and his brother Werner Gaunt (Richard) took British nationality, and adopted their stepfather's surname, witnessed by Deed poll, and abandoned the use of their first Christian names.

== War ==
Upon the outbreak of war they both volunteered for the British Army. Charles's recruitment was deferred by the authorities to the following year to enable him to complete his degree. He joined the Buffs as a private soldier, but was promoted to corporal within 10 days and commissioned directly on 25 February 1941. He then commanded one of two platoons of the 70th Battalion which were guarding Chartwell during Churchill's recuperation from illness there for three months. Out of courtesy he was invited with the other officers to dine weekly with Churchill during this period. It is unclear whether the Prime minister realised he was a German.

From there he was posted to the 9th Battalion on 4 August 1943, but on 14 December 1943 he joined MI6 where he was given the code-name Anderton and worked with undercover Soviet agent Kim Philby, whom he disliked, and in whom he saw none of the supposed Philby charm. He was one of the first to voice suspicions about Philby. His brother Richard was also in MI6 and interrogated Rudolf Hess.

=== Belgium ===
Charles took part in the liberation of Belgium, where one of his first duties was to take over Breendonk Concentration Camp, a poignant experience for a German. He and his boss, Richard Gatty, were accidentally the first Allied soldiers in Antwerp, where Charles was billeted on the generous hospitality of the Baroness van der Gracht de Rommerswael, having got ahead of the advancing Canadians and arrived in the town while the Germans were still there. Aided by the competent Belgian Commissaire Bloch, Gatty and he then rounded up the entire German local network of 68 spies, an action for which the Brussels office of MI6, which was headed by Robert Barclay and included Malcolm Muggeridge, claimed the credit, provoking an angry written protest from Gatty to Barclay which said "our job is to tell lies to the enemy."

=== Norway ===
Charles then took part in the liberation of Norway, where he captured the complete Gestapo archive which enabled him to arrest fugitive Nazis, including Karl Fritzsch, the Deputy Commandant of Auschwitz. In his 2007 memoirs, For He Is an Englishman, Memoirs of a Prussian Nobleman, Captain Arnold-Baker recorded that as an MI6 officer in Oslo he arrested Fritzsch: "We picked up, for example, the deputy commandant of Auschwitz, a little runt of a man called Fritzsch whom we naturally put in the custody of a Jewish guard – with strict instructions not to damage him, of course."

He also arrested senior German military figures (King Haakon VII's Medal of Freedom). He took the view that as the war was now practically over, it was important to gather as much intelligence about the Soviet army, since this was plainly the new threat. In this he was thwarted, and his reports concerning his interrogations of such figures as a high civilian official in the German administration of occupied Russia, von der Ow, who described the anti-communist feelings of much of the population of the western USSR, were buried by his superiors who were, as it later emerged, Soviet spies. It seems that as a consequence he voiced suspicions about Philby which were later conveyed by M. Oldfield to Washington.

== Civilian career ==
Arnold-Baker was called to the Bar in 1948, and practised in the Admiralty Division until 1952 in the chambers of J. Roland Adams Q.C., a former colleague from MI6. He received the Gwylim Gibbons Award from Nuffield College, Oxford, in 1959.

After leaving the Admiralty Division he accepted a post as Secretary of the National Association of Parish Councils. He transformed this body into the union of all rural local councils in England and Wales, the National Association of Local Councils, (NALC), and he endeavoured to strengthen local customs and government on a small scale against the growth of larger local government blocs. In 1966 he was awarded the OBE for this work. He served as a member of the European Committee of the International Union of Local Authorities 1966–1978, and was a Delegate to the European Local Government Assembly at Strasbourg 1960–78. He also developed strong relations with the Women's Institute and was for many years one of the very few men invited to their AGM. Through this connection he was approached by Keep Britain Tidy to lobby Parliament for better legislation against pollution. The result was the 1971 Dangerous Litter Act..

In 1978 he left the NALC to pursue an academic career as a Professor of Arts administration at the City University, London, where he lectured in Law and architecture, a subject on which he had no formal training.

In 1966 he commenced writing The Companion to British History. The work was originally commissioned by the Oxford University Press, but after several disagreements with editors he decided to let his son publish his work using the family business of Longcross Press which he had founded. In January 2009 the Spectator described it as "one of the most remarkable books ever written".

From 1942 he lived in the Inner Temple, where he was the Senior Barrister, and looked after his wife. He completed a further edition of his Companion to British History published by Loncross Denholm Press (Dec 2008).

== Publications ==
- Everyman's Dictionary of Dates, London, 1954.
- Parish Administration. London, 1958.
- New Law and Practice of Parish Administration, London, 1966.
- The 5000 and the Power Tangle, London, 1967.
- The Local Government Act, London, 1972 & 1973.
- Local Council Administration, London, 1975 (13th edition 2022).
- The Local Government Planning & Land Act 1980, London, 1981.
- Practical Law for Arts Administrators, London, 1983 (3rd edition 1992).
- Genealogisches Handbuch des Adeligen Hauser, A Band XVIII, Limburg an der Lahn, 1985 edition, page 19.
- The 5000 and the Living Constitution, London, 1986.
- Arnold-Baker, Professor CharlesMonarchy, published by the International Monarchist League, London, 1991, (P/B).
- The Companion to British History, London, (1st edition 1996, Longcross Press), 2nd edition, 2001, Routledge; Third Edition by Loncross Denholm Press November 2008, ISBN 978-0-9560983-0-6
- von Blumenthal, Wolfgang, For he is an Englishman – Memoirs of a Prussian Nobleman, London, 2007, Jeremy Mills Publishing, ISBN 978-1-905217-44-1
