= Society of Local Council Clerks =

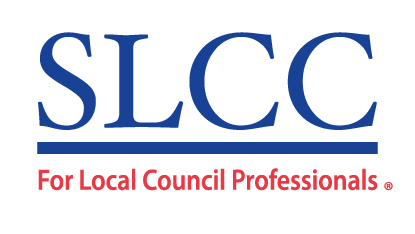
- Abbreviation: SLCC
- Founded: 1972
- Purpose: Local Government
- Headquarters: Taunton, Somerset, England
- Region served: England & Wales
- Members: 4000+ Clerks
- Chief Executive: Rob Smith
- President: Malcolm Nicholson
- Chairman: Adam Keppel-Green FSLCC
- Website: https://www.slcc.co.uk/

The Society of Local Council Clerks (SLCC) is the professional body for Local Council Clerks. As of 2017, it represents the Clerks to over 5,000 councils.

== History ==
The SLCC was formed in 1972 at a side meeting held during the National Association of Local Councils conference. It started with under 50 member Clerks and has steadily grown. In 2001, the then National Executive Council decided to appoint professional officers to run the society which has seen it grow to serve over 5000 councils with a turnover of over £1,000,000. In 2017, the Society was reconstituted as a Limited Company with a Board of 18 Directors.

== Membership ==
Membership of the SLCC is open to clerks or other senior officers employed in town, parish and community councils in England and Wales, as well as clerks to Charter Trustees and Parish Meetings. A professional development scheme promotes a commitment to continued professional development and entitles members to post-nominal letters:

- Student - StSLCC
- Principal - PSLCC
- Fellow - FSLCC

The Society also provides affiliate and past service membership classes.

== Training and Development ==
The SLCC provides a range of training and development opportunities for members including webinars, conferences and qualifications.

The Certificate in Local Council Administration (CILCA) is an entry level qualification equivalent to an A-Level which forms the basis for a "qualified clerk" as required to exercise the General Power of Competence which was introduced through the Localism Act 2011.

The SLCC delivers a Community Governance higher education course awarding qualifications through De Montfort University from a CertHE to BA, and a Masters degree in Public Leadership.

== Civility and Respect ==
In response to growing concerns about bullying and harassment in local government the SLCC established the Civility and Respect project in partnership with NALC, One Voice Wales and County Associations. As of July 2024, 1,556 councils have signed the Civility and Respect pledge committing to improving and embedding higher standards and calling for a change in legislation to re-introduce sanctions for elected members.
