= Frederick Arnold-Baker =

British lawyer

Sir Frederick Spencer Arnold-Baker (1 April 1885 – 9 December 1963) was a British lawyer.

He was the third son of Frederick Arnold-Baker (born 30 December 1845) and Helen Catherine Nairne (born 1 September 1843), and grandson of the New Zealand watercolourist Major Richard Baker (1810–1854). He was the King's Remembrancer (later Queen's Remembrancer) from 1951 to 1957. His uncle, General Sir Charles Edward Nairne, was Commander-in-Chief, India in 1898. His brother Percival was the stepfather of Charles Arnold-Baker né von Blumenthal.

He was a founder and the second President of the Lansdowne Club (1940–1954).

He was knighted in 1954.
