= Paul Georg von Möllendorff =

German linguist and diplomat (1847–1901)

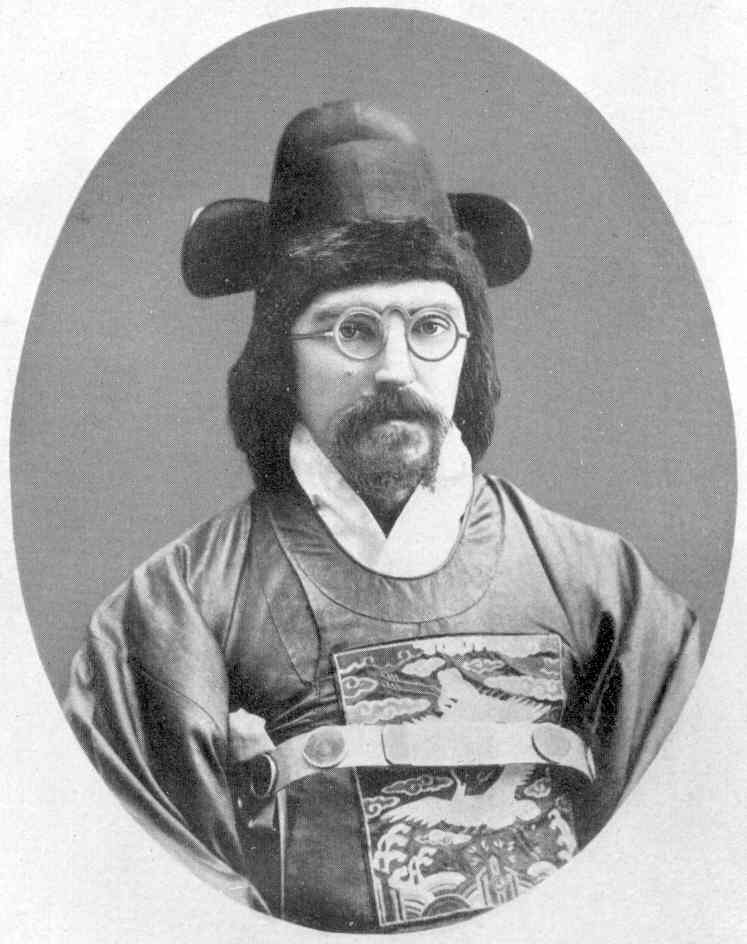
Möllendorff in official Korean dress

Paul Georg von Möllendorff (17 February 1847 in Zehdenick, Prussia – 20 April 1901 in Ningbo, China) was a German linguist and diplomat. Möllendorff is mostly known for his service as an adviser to the Korean king Gojong in the late nineteenth century and for his contributions to Sinology. In English-language publications, Möllendorff is often credited with having designed a system for romanizing the Manchu language, which was in fact the creation of his compatriot Hans Conon von der Gabelentz.

== Early life ==
Hailing from the Prussian aristocratic family von Möllendorf, Paul Georg von Möllendorff was the son of Georg von Möllendorff, a high-ranking Prussian civil servant. The young Möllendorff attended gymnasium in Görlitz and he enrolled at University of Halle in 1865, where he studied law, oriental studies and philology. Möllendorff showed a strong aptitude for the study of classical and foreign languages and acquired a good command of Hebrew, but did not study any East Asian languages at the time.

== China ==
In 1869, Möllendorff interrupted his studies and went to China in order to join the Imperial Maritime Customs Service in Shanghai. While working for the Customs in Shanghai and later Hankou, Möllendorff acquired a good command of Chinese and quickly passed the required language exam. However, he soon grew dissatisfied with his tasks in the service and left it in 1874 in order to join the German consular service as an interpreter and was eventually promoted German vice-consul in Tianjin. During his service in Tianjin, Möllendorff befriended Ma Jianzhong, who worked in the secretariat of the prominent Qing statesman, governor-general Li Hongzhang. In 1879, Möllendorff assisted Li in procuring weapons and warships from the German companies Vulkan and Krupp. In 1881, Möllendorff left the German consular service because of his complicated relationship to the German minister in Beijing, Max von Brandt.

== Korea ==
In 1882, Li Hongzhang recommended Möllendorff to the position of the adviser to the Korean government and in December 1882, he arrived in Seoul for his first audience with King Gojong. Möllendorff quickly learned enough Korean to be able to communicate with the king and soon earned the trust of the king, who appointed him deputy foreign minister and charged him with the establishment of the Korean Customs Service. Möllendorff adopted the Sino-Korean name Mok In-dok (穆麟德 Mok Indeok, Mù Líndé in Mandarin) and soon became a very influential figure in the Korean government.

Möllendorff wanted to assert the independence of Korea and contrary to the wishes of Li Hongzhang and Robert Hart, he wanted to make the Korean Customs Service as independent from the Chinese Maritime Customs Service as possible. Möllendorff also advocated that Korea enter into an alliance with the Russian Empire to counterbalance Chinese and Japanese influences on the Korean peninsula. In response to this, the British occupied the Korean island of Geomun by force, calling it Port Hamilton. Consequently, the Qing government felt that Möllendorff acted too independently and in 1885 Li Hongzhang forced Möllendorff's resignation from the Korean government. In 1888, King Gojong unsuccessfully tried to reinstate Möllendorff.

== Scholarly work and later life ==
Having left his position in Korean government, Möllendorff returned to work in the Imperial Maritime Customs and became Commissioner of Customs in the southern treaty port of Ningbo, where he would spend the last days of his life. In Ningbo, he worked to improve the customs service and also wrote a number of works on Sinology. Between 1896 and 1897 he was the president of the China Branch of the Royal Asiatic Society.

== See also ==
- Transliterations of Manchu

== Sources ==
- Lee Yur-Bok. West Goes East: Paul Georg Von Möllendorff and Great Power Imperialism in Late Yi Korea. Honolulu: University of Hawaii Press, 1988.

== Selected works ==
=== Public domain ===
==== English ====
- Paul Georg von Möllendorff (1901). The ningpo syllabary. Shanghai: American Presbyterian mission press. p. 241.(Harvard University)
- Paul Georg von Möllendorff (1910). G. W. Sheppard (ed.). Ningbo colloquial handbook. American Presbyterian Mission Press. p. 241.
- Paul Georg von Möllendorff (1910). Ningbo colloquial handbook. American Presbyterian Mission Press.
- P.G. von Möllendorff (1910). G. W. Sheppard (ed.). Ningbo colloquial handbook. p. 282.
- Paul Georg von Möllendorff (1905). Catalogue of P.G. von Möllendorff's library. SHANGHAI: Printed at the American Presbyterian Mission Press. p. 220.(the University of California)
- Paul Georg von Möllendorff (1905). Catalogue of P.G. von Möllendorff's library. SHANGHAI: Printed at the American Presbyterian Mission Press. pp. 220.(Harvard University)
- Paul Georg von Möllendorff (1896). The family law of the Chinese. SHANGHAI: Nanking Road: Printed by Kelly & Walsh, limited. pp. 60.(Harvard University)
- (with Otto Franz von Möllendorff.) Manual of Chinese Bibliography, Being a List of Works and Essays Relating to China. Shanghai, London: Kelly & Walsh, Trübner & co., 1876.
- "Essay on Manchu Literature." Journal of the North China Branch of the Royal Asiatic Society 24, no. 113 (1889–90): 1-45.
- Paul Georg von Möllendorff (1892). A Manchu Grammar. Printed at the American Presbyterian mission press. Shanghai, 1892.
- "Die Juden in China." In Monatsschrift für Geschichte und Wissenschaft des Judentums. (1895): 327–331
- Ningpo Colloquial Handbook. Shanghai: American Presbyterian Mission Press, 1910.

==== French ====
- Paul Georg von Möllendorff (1896). Le droit de famille chinois (in French). PARIS 28, RUE BONAPARTE, 28.: E. Leroux. pp. 106.(Harvard University) (Translated by Rodolphe de Castella)

==== German ====
- Paul Georg von Möllendorff (1906). Praktische Anleitung zur Erlernung der hochchinesischen Sprache (4 ed.). Kelly and Walsh. pp. 179.(the University of Michigan)
- Paul Georg von Möllendorff (1895). Das chinesische Familienrecht. SCHANGHAI: s.n. p. 67.(the University of Michigan)
- Paul Georg von Möllendorff (1895). Das chinesische Familienrecht. SCHANGHAI: s.n. p. 67.(the University of California)
- Paul Georg von Möllendorff (1895). Das chinesische Familienrecht. s.n. p. 67.(Harvard University)

=== Modern reprints ===
- Paul Georg Von Mollendorff (2010). The Ningpo Syllabary (reprint ed.). Kessinger Publishing, LLC. p. 256. ISBN 978-1-120-90920-6.
- Paul Georg Von Mllendorff (2010). Catalogue of P.G. Von Mllendorff's Library (illustrated ed.). General Books LLC. p. 134. ISBN 978-1-151-74076-2.
- Paul Georg Von M Llendorff (2010). Catalogue of P.G. Von M Llendorff's Library (reprint ed.). Nabu Press. p. 238. ISBN 978-1-143-20880-5.
- Paul Georg Von Moellendorff (2010). Le Droit de Famille Chinois (reprint ed.). Kessinger Publishing, LLC. p. 118. ISBN 978-1-166-71706-3.(Translated by Rodolphe De Castella )
- Paul Georg Von Moellendorff (2010). Le Droit de Famille Chinois (reprint ed.). Kessinger Publishing, LLC. p. 118. ISBN 978-1-166-81003-0.(Translated by Rodolphe De Castella )
- Paul Georg Von Mllendorff (2010). Praktische Anleitung Zur Erlernung Der Hochchinesischen Sprache (reprint ed.). BiblioBazaar. p. 106. ISBN 978-1-141-19028-7.
