= Blumenthal family =

German noble family

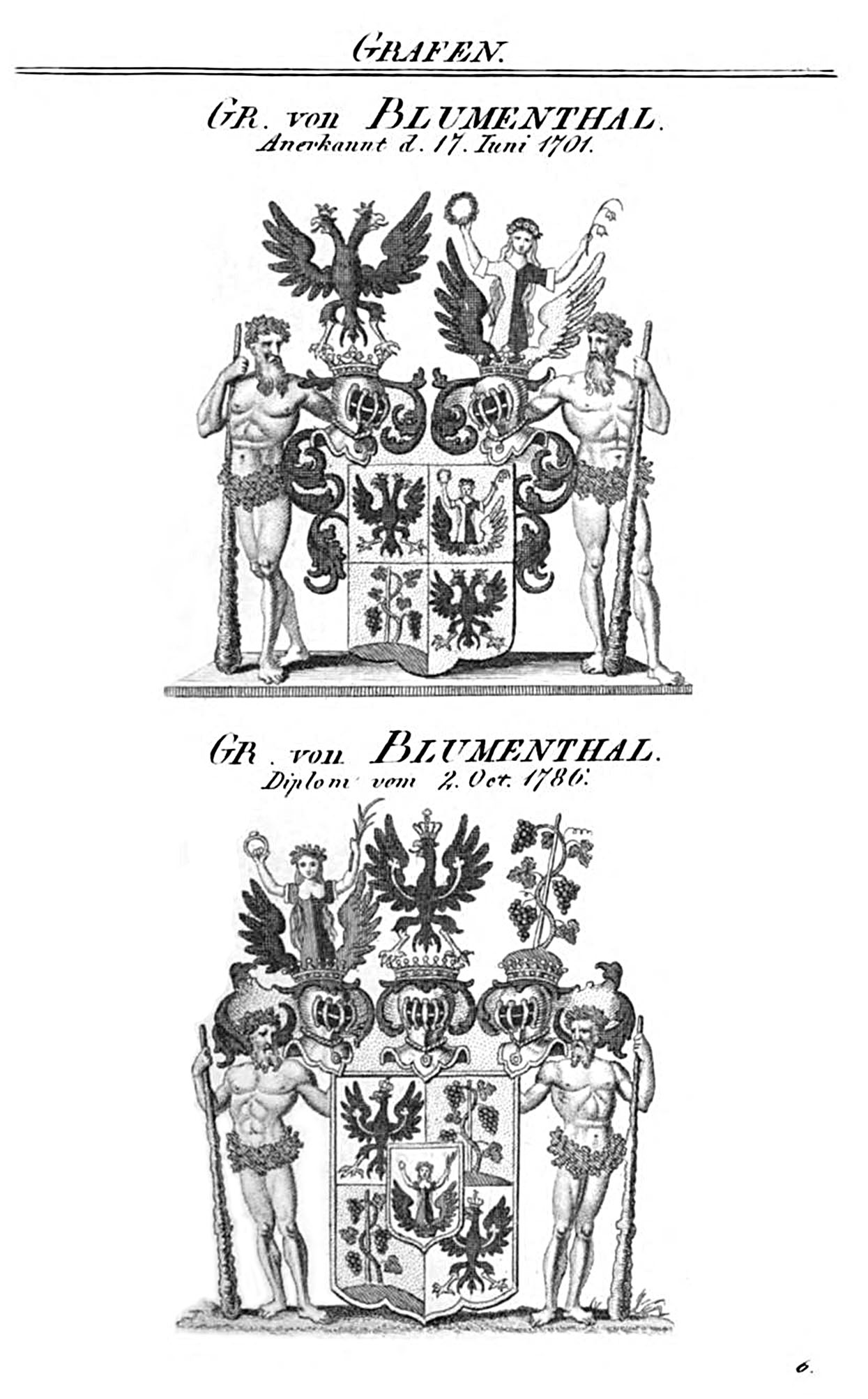
Arms granted to Ludwig I von Blumenthal in 1701 and (below) to Hans and Joachim von Blumenthal in 1786, upon Hans being elevated to Count (Graf). Note that here the vine is planted, not couped.

The Blumenthal family is a Lutheran and Roman Catholic German noble family, originally from Brandenburg-Prussia. Other (unrelated) families of this name exist in Switzerland and formerly in Russia, and many unrelated families (quite a few of them Jewish) called Blumenthal, without "von", are to be found worldwide.

The family was already noble from earliest times (Uradel), dating from the days of the Holy Roman Empire in the Middle Ages, long before the creation of the Kingdom of Prussia and the German Empire, and different branches acquired different titles over time. All living members of the noble family are descended from Heinrich (V) von Blumenthal (1654–93), whose baronial status was limited to the borders of Brandenburg. Other members of the family were raised to allodial baronies (Freiherren), all of which are now extinct, or to countships, of which only one line survives. One member of the family, Georg (I) was a Prince-Bishop (i.e. a head of state). In the case of another, Leonhard (I) the Kaiser announced in the Court Circular his intention to raise him to Prince, but he died months later before this could be enacted.

== Origin ==
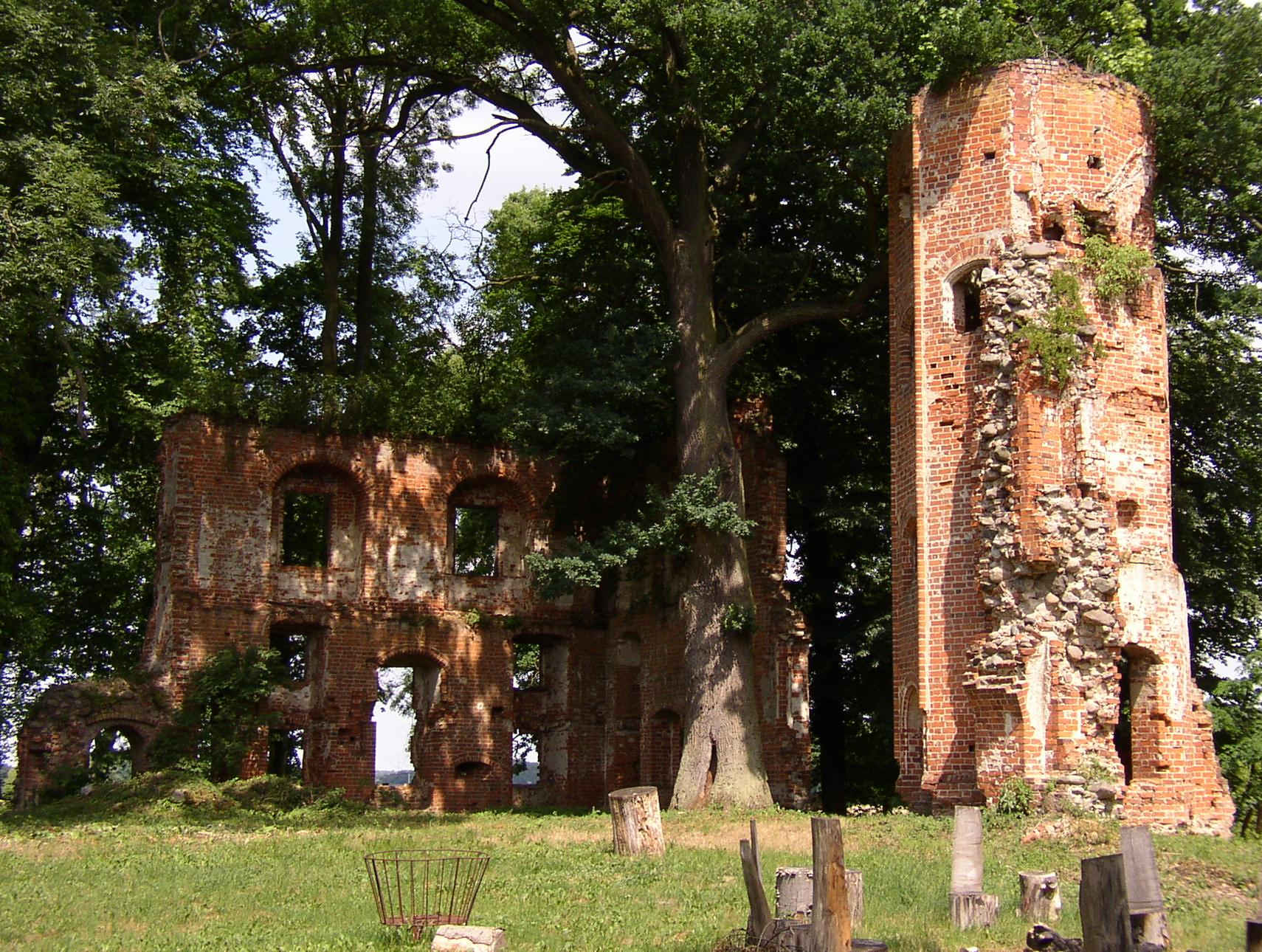
Horst Castle at Blumenthal, seat of the Blumenthal family from the 13th century until 1810

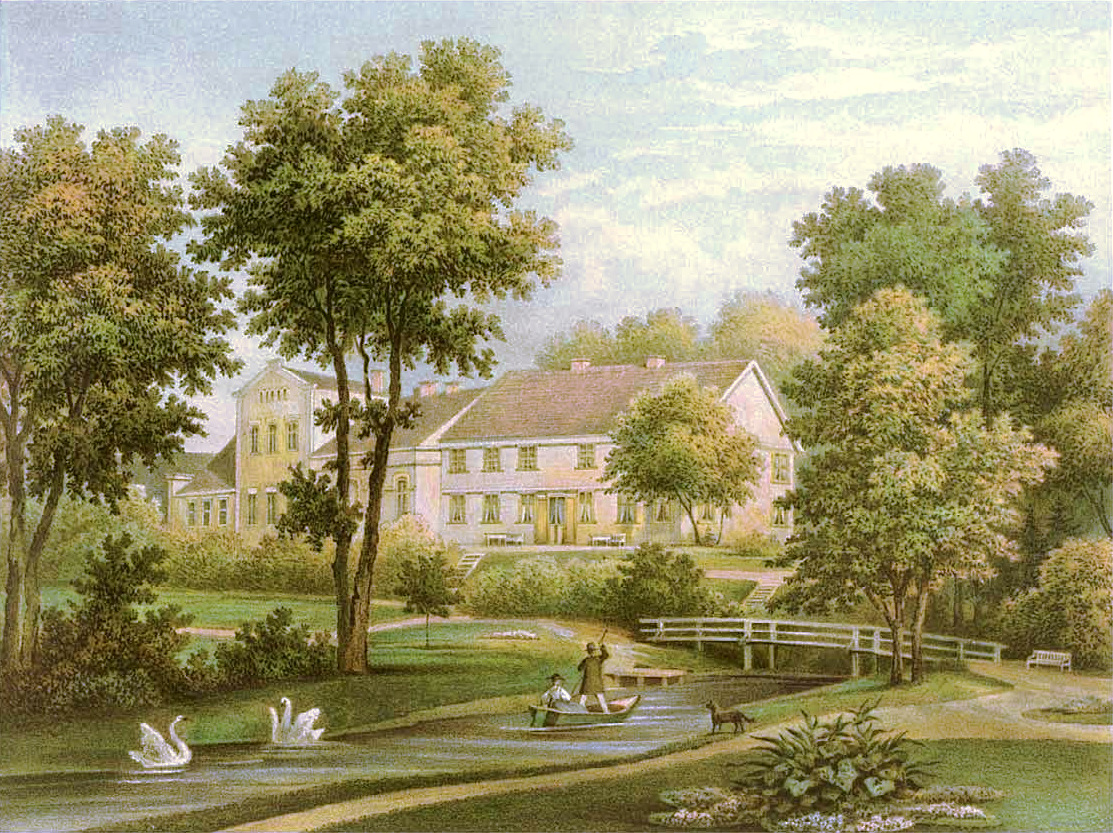
Quackenburg, seat of a major branch of the Blumenthal family from the early 18th century onwards

Like the von Grabow family, whose descendants have included Pushkin, the Blumenthals were originally a branch of the Ammendorf (or Amendorf ) family, who inherited the estates of Blumenthal and Grabow from the only daughter and heiress of Nikolaus von Blumenthal, first referred to in a document of 1240. His family probably originally came from Bloemendaal ("Flower Valley" or "Valley of Flowers") in Holland and re-located first to Blumenthal near Verden in the diocese of Bremen and thence to Blumenthal in the Archdiocese of Magdeburg, where they were vassals of the Wendish Counts of Plotho, naming each settlement after the previous one.

The Plotho family expanded its estates in the Prignitz in the 13th century, bringing Nikolaus von Blumenthal with them. There he named the villages of Blumenthal and Grabow after his properties in the Archdiocese of Magdeburg. The family of his son-in-law, Ruthger von Amendorf, had also come from the country around Bremen. They inherited Nikolaus von Blumenthal's estates and took his name. The castle of Horst, near Blumenthal in the Prignitz, was the family seat for over 600 years, until 1810. The family also claimed a legendary descent from the Roman Emperor Florianus, as well as from the Arthurian knights Garel and Daniel von Blumenthal, whose stories are told in 13th-century poems by Der Pleier and Der Stricker, respectively.

== Martial and political history ==
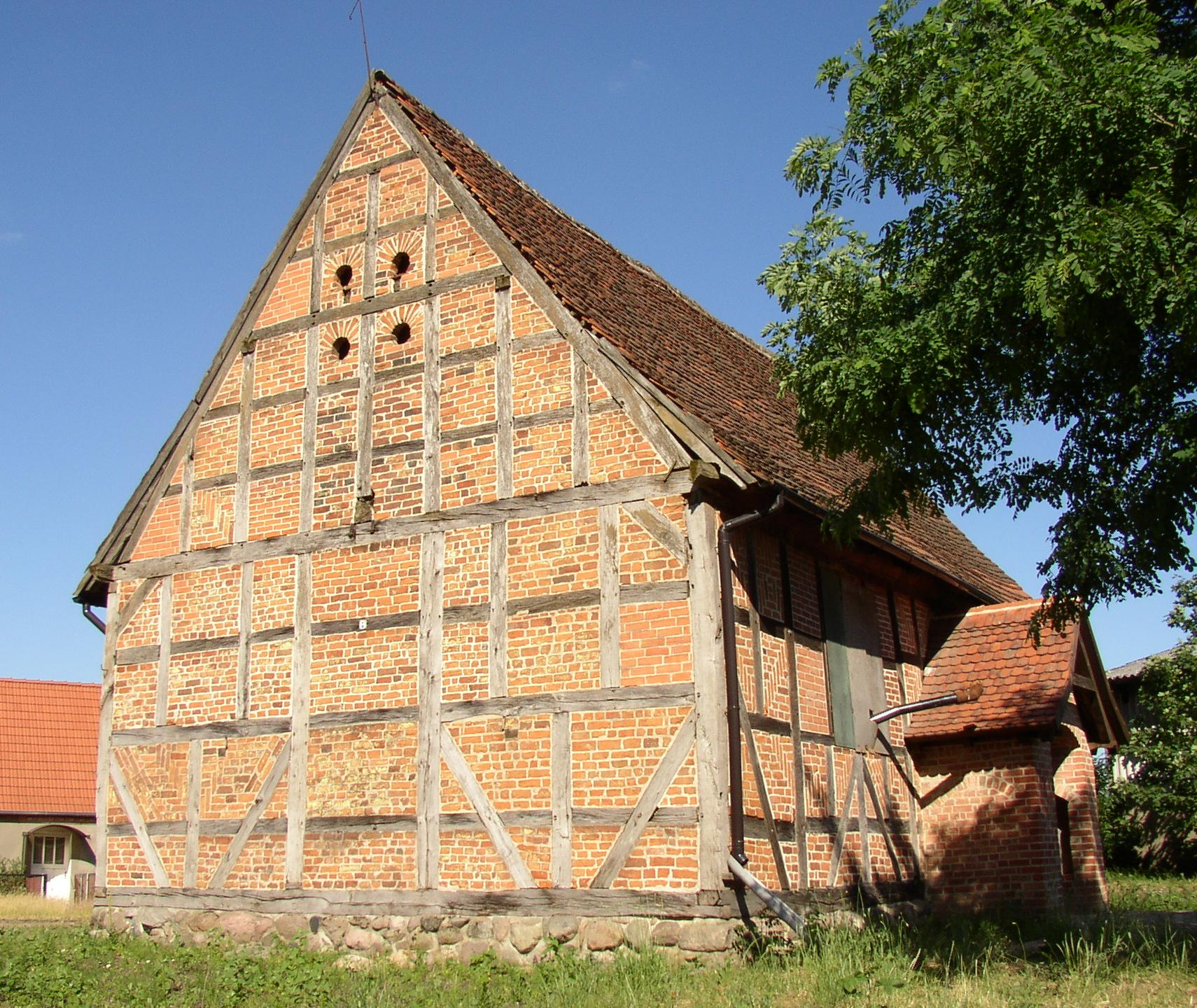
Horst Chapel, erected after the destruction of the original chapel during the Thirty Years' War

The family had a strong military tradition. Twenty of its members died in battle, including one leading a cavalry charge at Blenheim; eleven fought at the Battle of Königgrätz alone, and of eighteen who served in the Franco-Prussian War eleven fought at the Battle of Gravelotte. Nineteen served in the First World War. Three of its members won the Pour le Mérite (Blue Max), two received the Order of the Black Eagle, one became a field-marshal and six became generals, besides numerous family members who were regimental colonels. The family also produced three Prussian ministers of war, one leading statesman under King Jérome of Westphalia (a Chevalier of the Légion d'honneur), Danzig's longest-serving governor and a prominent 19th-century Bavarian politician opposed to rising antisemitism. One member of the family became a head of state (Georg, Prince-Bishop of Ratzeburg, see below).

== Prominent members ==
- Ruthger von Ammendorf (whose nephew became Ruthger von Blumenthal-Amendorf and later Ruthger von Blumenthal), Bishop of Brandenburg 1241–51
- Otto (II) Magistrate in 1420, a bulwark of Frederick Count of Zollern against the Wendish nobility of the Brandenburg Mark.
- Otto (III) son of the above, Captain of the Prignitz 1415–22; Castellan of Lenzen 1420–22
- Hans (II), son of Otto (III), Vogt of Arneburg 1440–50
- Georg (I) (1490–1550), the last Catholic sovereign ruler in northern Germany, and the only Bishop in Brandenburg during the Protestant Reformation to die a Catholic.
- Joachim Friedrich (I) (1609–1657), diplomat and politician of Brandenburg-Prussia
- Heinrich (V) (died 1693), the most recent common ancestor of all living members of the family, fought at the Battle of Fleurus in Derfflinger's Foot (Stayn's Brigade) and was addressed by the Elector Frederick III (the future King in Prussia) as "Obristwachtmeister usw. Baron von Blumenthal" (roughly, "Major, etc., Baron von Blumenthal)
- Christoph Caspar, Brandenburg's Ambassador to France, was the son of Joachim Friedrich. He negotiated the Peace of Oliva. He narrowly lost to Count Schwarzenberg the election to the Grand Mastership of the Order of Saint John (Bailiwick of Brandenburg). His son
- Ludwig (I) (1666–1704) became a Count of the Holy Roman Empire in 1701, was a chamberlain to Frederick I King of Prussia and was Colonel of the Prussian Life Dragoons, at whose head he was killed in a charge up the slope to Oberglau at the Battle of Blenheim; the regiment lost 300 men. He married Sophie Wilhelmina von Schöning, daughter of the Field Marshal and War Minister Hans Adam von Schöning.
- Ludwig (II) (died 1760) was President of Frederick the Great's principal ministry, the War and Domains Directory. He was succeeded by his nephew.
- Ludwig (II)'s sons Friedrich (died 1745) and Hans (1722–1788) both commanded Frederick the Great's famous Gardes du Corps, which Friedrich had founded. Hans won the Pour le Mérite at Hohenfriedberg. He had to leave the army after being wounded leading his regiment in a successful cavalry charge at the Battle of Lobositz. In 1786 he was made a Count, together with his cousin Joachim (VIII) and supervised the education of Frederick William III's brother, Prince Henry.
- Their brother Henrich (VII), a major in Prinz Heinrich's Regiment, was killed in action at Ostritz in 1756. His gallant defence was reported in the local press and his friend the poet von Kleist wrote his epitaph.
- Georg (IV) (born at Quackenburg, Pomerania, in 1722, died 1784) won the Pour le Mérite at the Battle of Prague. In March 1760 his defensive action against a surprise attack at Neustadt caught the attention of the British press. He was charged with raising forces to oppose the invasion of Pomerania in the 1760s by the Russians, who put a price on his head. He became a major general. His nephew
- Werner (I) (1725–1824) and his son Werner (III) (1766–1832) both commanded the dragoon regiment known as the Porzellaner
- Ludwig (V) (1774–1813), brother of Werner (III), fought at Jena and Eylau and was mortally wounded leading the 2nd Squadron of the Brandenburg Dragoons in Thümen's Brigade at Dennewitz.
- Joachim (VIII) Christian (1720–1800) Prussian Minister of War and Finance, was made a count together with his cousin Hans, by an unusual double-patent.
- Ludwig (I)'s daughter Countess Charlotte (1701–1761 (married to General Alexander von Dönhoff), Count Heinrich (VII)'s widow Marie Thérèse, née d'Harscamp(1712–82) and Friedrich (V)'s widow Leopoldine, the biographer of Zieten, were all chief ladies-in-waiting to Princess Henry, sister-in-law of Frederick the Great. A sculpture of Marie Thérèse by Jean-Pierre-Antoine Tassaert was destroyed by allied bombing.

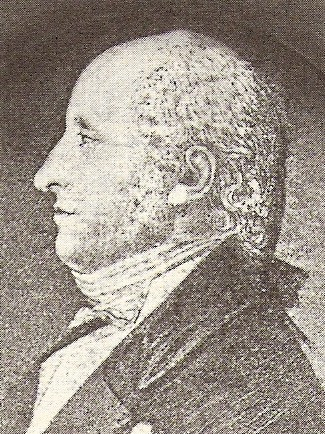
Count Heinrich (VIII) von Blumenthal, 1765–1830, Mayor of Magdeburg, politician and courtier under King Jérome of Westphalia

- Count Heinrich (VIII) (1765–1830), the last Blumenthal to occupy the family seat at Horst bei Blumenthal, was Mayor of Magdeburg (where his statue is to be seen) and Head Chamberlain to Jérôme Bonaparte, King of Westphalia, as well as governor of Jerôme's palace at Wilhelmshöhe.
- Count Albert (1797–1860) commanded the Prussian First Foot Guards from 1851 to 1856 and retired as a lieutenant-general
- Robert was Regierungspresident (Governor) of Danzig from 1841 to 1863 and of Sigmaringen from 1864 to 1873. He was a leading opponent of Roman Catholicism in Prussia.
- Leonhard (I) (1810–1900), field marshal and leading general of the German wars of unification
- Albrecht (IV) (1842–1918), son of Leonhard, who published his father's memoirs, became a lieutenant general.
- Louis (Ludwig (VII)) (1811–1903), brother of Leonhard, led the Prussian 52nd Infantry as Colonel into its decisive charge on the Austrian Hoch- und Deutschmeister Regiment at the Battle of Nachod in 1866. He became a major-general.
- Werner (1870–1946), Lt-Colonel, son of Louis
- Maximilian (I) (1823–1914), was a major in the 1st East Prussian Grenadiers No. 1 during the Austro-Prussian War, in which he won the Order of the Red Eagle (Fourth Class). In 1870 he commanded a battalion of the 73rd Fusiliers and won the Iron Cross (Second Class) at Gravelotte, having led his battalion through the murderous crossfire of the Mance Ravine and stood firm while being bombarded by the artillery of both sides. After the war he commanded the 1st Silesian Grenadier Regiment No. 10. He retired as a major general.
- Count Werner von Blumenthal-Suckow (1815–1883), was a Member of Parliament of the North German Confederation and also of the Prussian Abgeordnetenhaus
- Count Werner (V) von Blumenthal-Suckow (1848–1928), a veteran of the Austro- and Franco-Prussian wars, and a friend of Prince Frederick von Hohenzollern of Prussia, became Chamberlain to the King of Saxony. He was a leading moderate in the Conservative Party, and at the Tivoli Congress of 1892, at which Klasing persuaded the party to adopt antisemitism as part of its programme, he spoke out courageously. He was shouted down, and those who supported him did not dare do so publicly. His daughter Maria, a nun, was murdered in her 70s by the SS.
- Gustav (died 1913, buried at Lindi, Tanzania) commanded one of three columns in the campaign which ended the Maji-Maji wars in German East Africa.
- Hans (XI) (1855–1945), youngest son of Ludwig (VII), lost his two elder brothers in the Franco-Prussian War. Most of his adult life was uneventful. He was colonel of the 13th Hussars in 1900; Commander of the 24th cavalry Brigade (13th Hussars and 9th Dragoons) stationed in Metz in 1906, and promoted to major general, but after quarrelling with his commanding officer, General Maximilian von Prittwitz, he left the army in 1910 as a lieutenant general. However, on the outbreak of the First World War he rejoined the army and first commanded the 60th Landwehr Brigade, then the 49th in Bois de Lord, south of the Champagne, until 1917, when health forced him to retire again. He was made a Count of the Grand Duchy of Baden, and married Lillian Steinway-Oakes (1860–1904), daughter of the celebrated co-founder of Steinway & Sons, Henry Steinway, and sister-in-law of Baden's minister of the interior, Baron Heinrich von Bodman. His end was tragic. His son Curt joined the SA and rose to be Reiterstandartenführer (equivalent to a major general) in command of the 27th SA Reiterstandarte at Kyritz. On the night of 1 May 1945 Curt shot his wife, children and himself in front of his father and sister Clarissa. Shortly after that, the Russians arrived and attempted to rape the 65-year-old Clarissa. Hans, himself over ninety, drove (or shamed) them off. But the experience was a shock and he died of a heart attack a few days later on 7 May.
- Clarissa (1881–1971) mentioned above, made a career for herself during the 1930s as an impressionist painter in Florence and Rome. She was a Roman Catholic convert. A portion of those years are mentioned in the Memoir, "Artemis Smith's ODD GIRL Revisited" by Annselm Artemis Smith Morpurgo, daughter of Scandinavian Expressionist Painter and Sculptor Vilna Jorgen Morpurgo. Vilna resided and studied with Clarissa in Rome at Clarissa's studio on via Marghutta. As late as 1962, a gallery on via Marghutta is known to have still exhibited Clarissa's work. Both Clarissa and Vilna participated in a noted 1938 Group Show of Foreign Women Artists, which also included Elaine De Kooning, at another neighboring gallery on via Flamminia. Clarissa notably also painted a portrait of Vilna in 1933, taken to the US in 1940 by a branch of the Italian-Jewish Morpurgo Baronial Family and only recently (since 2009) placed on charity auction by The Savant Garde Institute. Additional history related to that obscure impressionist masterpiece may be found at the Vilna Jorgen Morpurgo webpage. Clarissa's technique is unmistakable although she may often have left her work unsigned. There are probably many other of her paintings that will eventually surface. She was also an accomplished Vatican restorer and probably, according to colleague Vilna Jorgen Morpurgo, also secretly a fine arts forger for the Vatican. Both Vilna and Clarissa were included in the elite artistic social circle surrounding Mussolini and Hitler in the 1930s, but it is also very likely, from Vilna's account, that Clarissa is one of the unsung heroines of the German aristocracy who secretly opposed and worked against Mussolini's alliance with Hitler and helped Vilna and her Italian-Jewish Family escape to the US in 1940.
- Albrecht (1889–1945) was a respected philologist, a Rhodes Scholar at Oxford, and as a poet was a leading member of the circle of Stefan George, to whom he introduced the Stauffenberg brothers. The dissident Lutheran pastor Dietrich Bonhoeffer conducted an illegal seminary in 1938 from Albrecht's estate at Groß Schlönwitz. In 1940, he joined the NSDAP. In 1945, faced with the advancing American troops and the defeat of Nazi Germany, he and his wife committed suicide in Marburg.
- Wolf-Werner von Blumenthal (1902–68), son of Lt. Col. Werner, was chairman of the family firm of Bachmann-von Blumenthal, which manufactured fighter aircraft during the Second World War. His diary of the last days of the war survives.
- Count Hans-Jürgen (1907–1944), officer who took part in Oster's 1938 conspiracy and was executed after the 20 July Plot against Adolf Hitler in 1944.
- Wulf von Blumenthal (1905–1999) served on the Eastern Front in 1943 and pursued a military career in the post-war Bundeswehr, rising to the rank of Colonel commanding the 32nd Panzer Grenadier Battalion.
- Werner Richard (1914–2003) and Wolfgang Charles, Albrecht's sons, were both educated at Oxford. They ceased using their first Christian name and adopted their stepfather's surname, becoming, respectively, Richard and Charles Arnold-Baker, joined the British army and both served as officers in MI6. Richard (called Captain Barnes in the transcripts) was in the team of officers who interrogated Rudolf Hess, and Charles commanded Winston Churchill's bodyguard for part of the war, and in Norway arrested the Deputy Commandant of Auschwitz, Karl Fritzsch. Charles was one of the earliest officers of MI6 to voice suspicions about the traitor Kim Philby. He was the Senior Barrister of the Inner Temple (his ashes are interred in the triforium of the Temple Church) and author of The Companion to British History.
- James Arnold-Baker (1944–2018), son of Werner Richard, read Geology at Oxford. He was CEO of BBC Enterprises from 1986 to 1994 and then became Secretary to the Delegates (Chief Executive) of Oxford University Press.
- Henry only son of Wolfgang Charles, read Theology at Oxford and was Deputy Dean of the EIB Institute from 2016-2023. He is the editor and publisher of his father's magnum opus, The Companion to British History, and himself the author of a history of this family, The Life and Times of Saint Hubert, Jactitation! (a book on a sensational legal case and its ramifications) and Seven Stories for Christmas and Three for Holy Week
- Ulrich formerly head of the United Nations Legal Department
- Julia (born 1970), Professor of Political Science at the Humboldt University, Berlin; from 2022, President of the Humboldt University.

All living members of the family are descended from Eustachius von Blumenthal and Margarethe Gans zu Puttlitz (married circa 1575). She was a descendant, via the families of Gleichen zu Tonna and Querfurt from Henry I the Child, Landgrave of Hesse, and thus also of St. Elizabeth of Hungary, St Ludwig of Thuringia ("Ludwig the Holy"), St. Hedwig of Silesia and Charlemagne, besides St. Olga of Pleskau, St. Vladimir of Kiev, St. Ludmilla of Bohemia, St. Olaf of Norway and St. Matilda von Ringelsheim.

== Principal historical estates ==
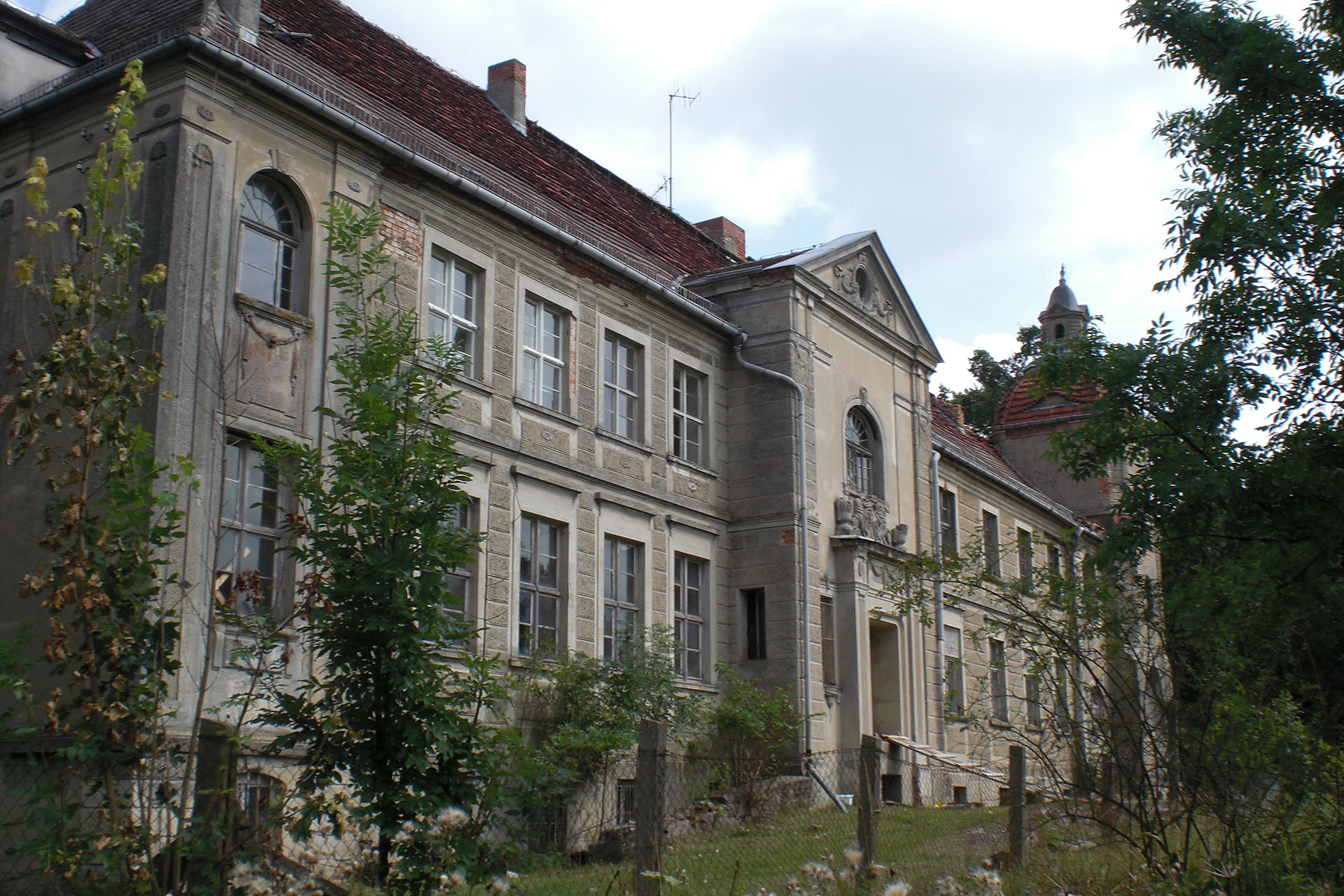
Krampffer

In the East Prignitz: Horst (1241–1810); Blumenthal (1263–1810); Hennekendorf (until 1318); Grabow (1274–1312); Dahlhausen (1487–1810); Brüsenhagen (mentioned in 1424); Vehlow (1486–1838; repurchased in 1930s); Krampfer (17th-18th century); Wüsten-Boddin (1458–95); Garz (1438–1541); Kyritz (Townhouse, 1315–1585)

In the West Prignitz: Pröttlin (1540–1756); Burg Stavenow (1647–1717); Rauschendorf & Schönermark (1798–1810); Abbendorf (1715-?); Krampffer

In the Old Brandenburg Mark: Schloss Arneburg (1441–1463)

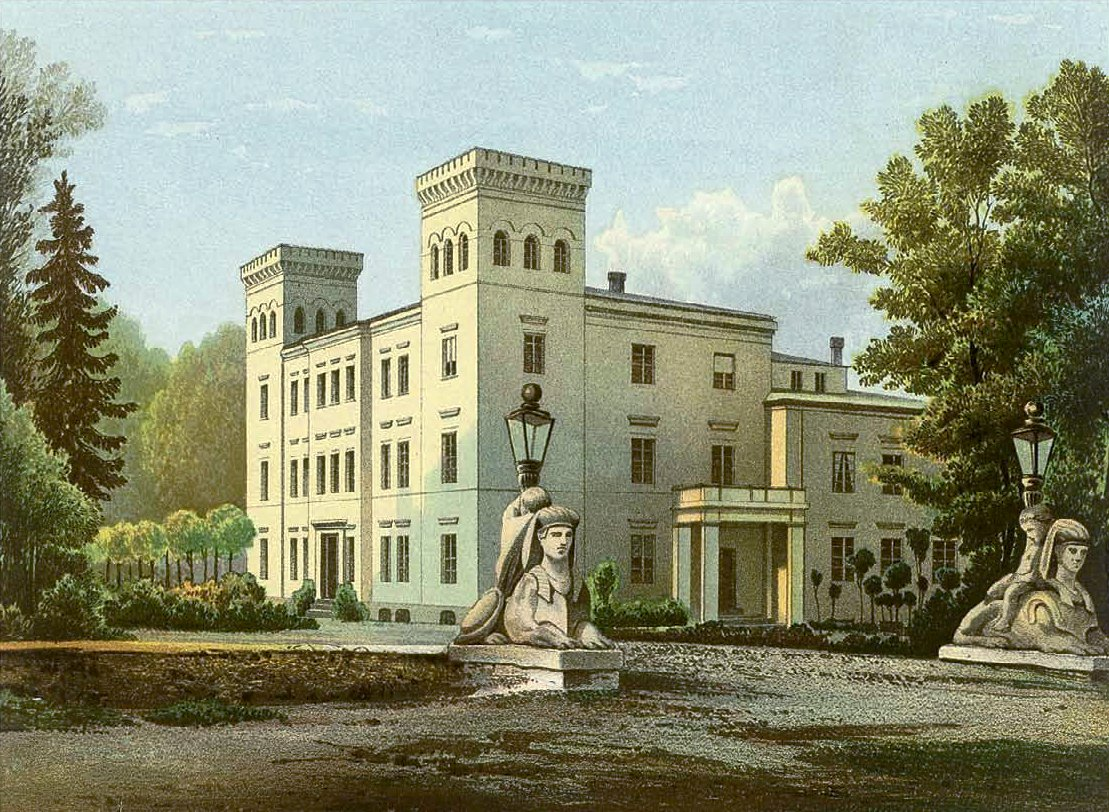
Steinhöfel, bought by Joachim (VIII) von Blumenthal, inherited by his daughter Charlotte and then by her son Valentin von Massow, an adjutant of Wellington's at Waterloo.

In the rest of the Brandenburg Mark: Bukow (1546–1556); Haselberg & Harnekop (1617–1662); Paretz (1677–1795); Flatow (1797–1810); Steinhöfel (1774–1800 - descended to Charlotte von Blumenthal and thence to her son Valentin von Massow) ); Trechwitz (1644–1650); Falkenberg

In the Lower Lausitz: Pretschen and Wittmannsdorf (1649 - mid-18th century); Guhrow (briefly in the 17th century)

In Mecklenburg: Adamsdorf (formerly Kuhschwanz; 1800–1835) and Liepen (1800–1810)

In Halberstadt: the former properties of the von Warberg family (1653–1732)

In Anhalt: Quellendorf (1871-late 19th century) bought by Field Marshal Count Leonhardt von Blumenthal from General Count Henckel von Donnersmarck and later transferred to his son-in-law Rudolf von Oettinger.

In Silesia: Hundsfeld in Oels (late 19th century)

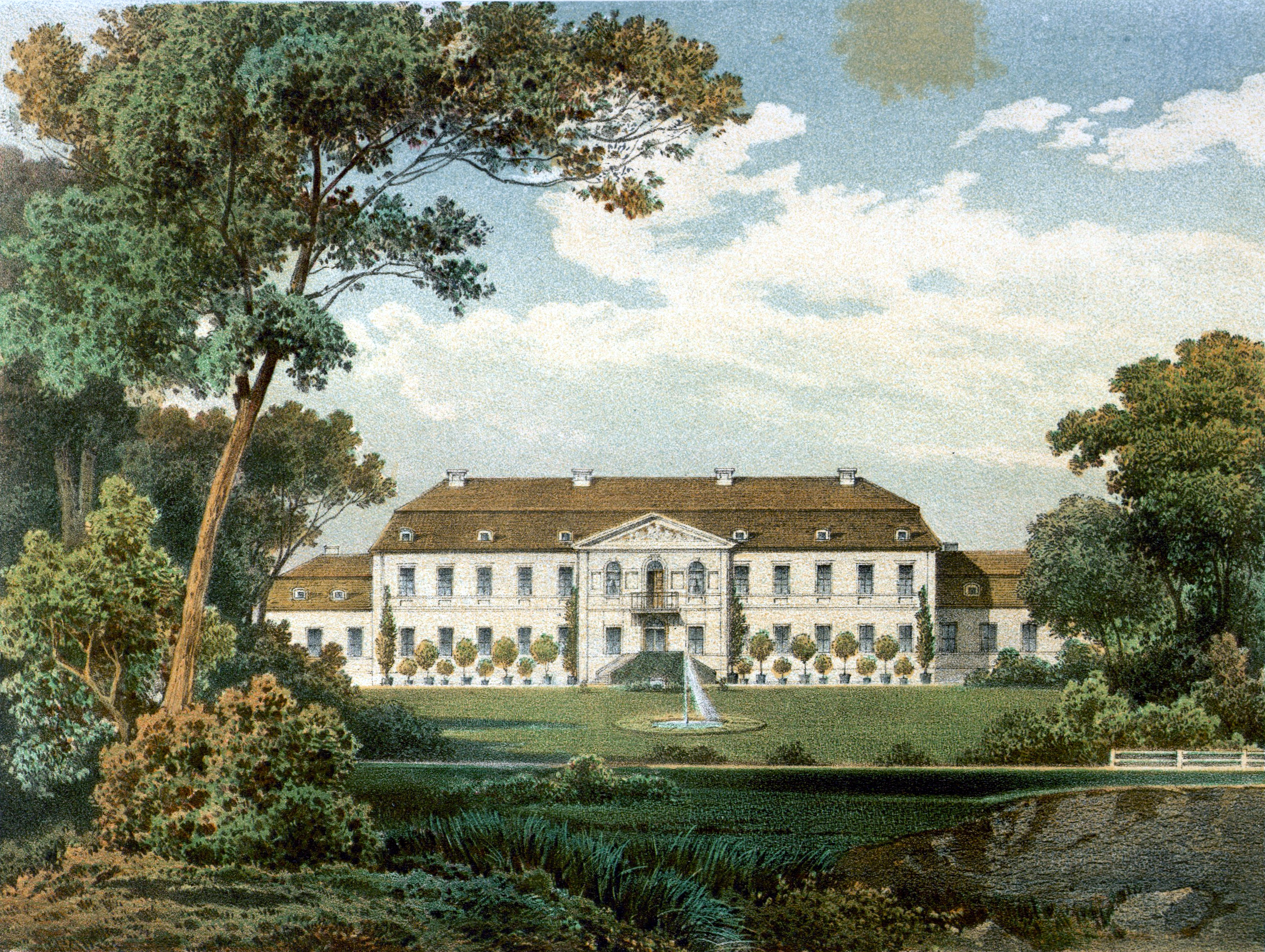
Suckow

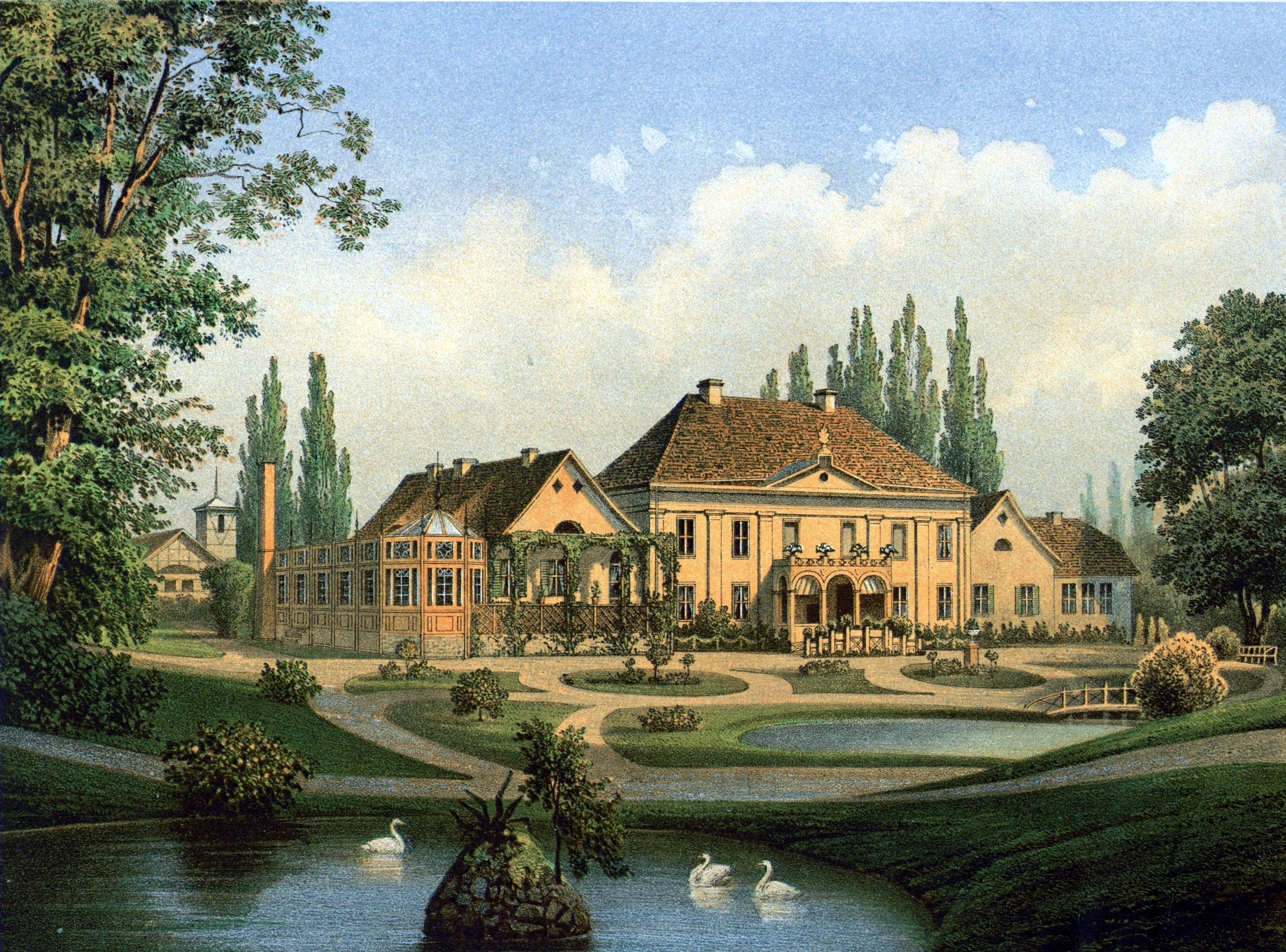
Varzin, sold by the Blumenthals to Bismarck in 1874

In Pomerania: Quackenburg (1717–1905); Egsow & Cummerzin (1734–1833); Suckow (19th century to 1874); Varzin (1874; sold to Bismarck); Jannewitz & Wendisch-Puddiger, with Chorow, Wussow, Gross Onessow, Klein Onessow, Groß Schlönwitz (1734–1773 and 1843–1945); Gross Möllen and Loiste (18th century); Staffelde (1883–1945; recovered and resold in 1990s); Segenthin (1834–1945); Deutsch-Puddiger (1839–1945); Grünwalde in Rummelsburg (briefly, 19th century); Natzlaff (19th Century).

In West Prussia: Gottschalk & Dohnastedt (1841 – after 1904)

In German New Guinea: Kurakagaul & Natava (1904–1920)

== Heraldry ==
Arms : Or (or depending on the branch of the family, party per pale, sable and or); in bend sinister, a vinestock couped (or planted, again depending upon the branch of the family), with three clusters and three leaves proper, all counterchanged. Crest: A virgin, dressed per pale or and sable (or in some cases undressed), between two eagles' wings, holding a wreath in her dexter hand.
