= Daniel von dem blühenden Tal =

Middle High German romance

- by Der Stricker
- Original title: Daniel von dem blühenden Tal
- Written: c. 1220–1230
- Language: Middle High German
- Subject: Arthurian legend
- Genre: Chivalric romance

Daniel von dem blühenden Tal (Daniel of the Flowering Valley) is an Arthurian romance composed around 1220–1230 by the Middle High German poet Der Stricker, who claimed he had received the story from a French troubadour. It tells how Sir Daniel, heir to the kingdom of Blumenthal, becomes a Knight of the Round Table and engages in fantastic adventures to defend King Arthur's land from an enemy ruler.

== Synopsis ==
Arthur welcomes Daniel to the Round Table after he defeats other formidable knights including Sir Percival and Sir Gawain. Before long, however, a herald in the form of an invincible giant riding a camel arrives with a message from an enemy potentate, King Matur. The herald demands Arthur swear immediate fealty to Matur, explaining that his country is defended by the contrivances of an inventor who has created a mobile palace carried by war elephants, invincible giants (of whom he is one), and a mechanical dragon whose scream is so intolerable that it makes even the staunchest fighting men cover their ears, rendering them useless. On the other hand, Matur's herald says submission to his master brings its attractions. The land is fertile, the conditions of vassalage are light, and the women are stunning. Each keeps her complexion unspoilt by means of a beautiful songbird called a Babian, who is trained to hover over her and protect her from the sun with his shadow.

Arthur bids for time while he assembles his troops, but in the meantime Daniel slips out of the castle intending to fight Matur alone. On the way, he meets with a series of adventures which, at the time, seem nothing but sideshows which delay him from his real purpose. These include rescuing a damsel from the attentions of an evil dwarf, after himself being saved by another noble lady from a magic net, and overcoming a horde of monsters without bellies. But these adventures enable him to acquire a magic sword which is crucial to the final victory over Matur. Daniel is then made a vassal-king of Arthur's over Matur's former Kingdom of Cluse. After the victory over Matur, Arthur himself is kidnapped by the father of the giants that Daniel killed during his adventure. The giant places Arthur on a mountaintop to starve and is only rescued due to Daniel's acquaintance with the owner of the magic net.

== Analysis ==
This much-neglected Arthurian epic does not fit into any of the recognised categories of Arthurian literature and is therefore a literary form in its own right; as such it possesses a unique place in German literature. The spirit of the heroic epic pervades Daniel, in contrast to other courtly Arthurian romances: Daniel's prestige comes from his abilities as a fighter, rather than his exemplification of courtly ideals, the pre-courtly focus on the importance of vassal-monarch relations prevails throughout the story, and Arthur takes part in the hostilities, contrary to his depiction as a roi fainéant in other romances. Der Pleier's romance Garel was written as a reaction to Daniel; Der Pleier found Daniel too brutal and cunning to make a proper hero, and wrote his romance in the spirit of contemporary courtly attitudes. While Daniel's popularity faded, Garel continued to be admired, and as late as 1400 Runckelstein Castle near Bolzano in Italy was decorated with frescos of scenes from Garel.

The Prussian family von Blumenthal fancifully claimed a connection to the hero of this romance, and in the Late Middle Ages one or two of its members were christened Daniel. A character named Sir Daniel appears in other Arthurian romances as well, often as the brother of Sir Dinadan and Sir Le Cote Mal Taile.

An edition of the Middle High German lines, with facing English translation, was published in 2003.

== Sources ==
- Lacy, Norris J. (1991). The New Arthurian Encyclopedia. New York: Garland. ISBN 0-8240-4377-4.
