= Johann Christian Theden =

Surgeon-General of the Prussian Army

Anton Theden (born 13 September 1714 in Steinbeck, Mecklenburg; died 21 October 1797 in Berlin), was Surgeon-General of the Prussian Army and personal doctor to Frederick the Great, a medical researcher, alchemist, and a leading freemason and Rosicrucian. He was also influential in bringing Russian Freemasonry under the Control of Prussian lodges, through which he exerted diplomatic influence.

== Life ==
Theden was the youngest of 23 children. Despite beginning as a mere barber's apprentice, he reached the pinnacle of the medical profession. One of his teachers was the city doctor (Stadtphysikus) Johann Siegmund Hahn (1696–1773) of Schweidnitz, who co-founded hydrotherapy in Germany, which is why Theden also became a practitioner.

A reference to his own origins can be found in Theden's own writings: "Our German army doctors, unfortunately! for the most part are trained by barbers. For three years they work for barbers and imbibe their teaching. After this they are apprenticed having learned nothing more than how to wash a beard and put on plaster and poultices... many can barely read and, even if they can, they learn no more than their teachers before them"

After the Seven Years' War (1756–1763) Theden was appointed Third Surgeon-General of the Prussian Army and after the death of Johann Leberecht Schmucker (1712–1786) he became First Surgeon-General at the Charité in Berlin (until his death in 1797). His successor was Surgeon-General Johann Goercke (1750–1822).

Theden performed his greatest service to surgery. His "inflamed wound or shot water" made of brandy, honey or sugar, vinegar and diluted sulphuric acid for treating inflamed wounds – a development of the method of his predecessor Schmucker – came into general use as "Tinctura Antimonii Thedenii". He designed the elastic catheter, a new method for stemming blood flow (hemostasis), and the use of hollow splints used in treating bone fractures.

He married Juliane Sophie Engel (1723–1778), daughter of Johann Gottlieb Engel (1689–1754), Alderman, and Catharina née Haupt (1701–1750). One of their daughters, Christiane Wilhemine (1753–1831) married Archdeacon Bolzius and, following his death, Major-General Gottfried Ludwig Matthias von Hartmann (1738–1807), commander of the Prussian Artillery Corps, who was decorated with the Pour le Mérite in 1775. Her daughter Louise von Hartmann married Werner von Blumenthal, ancestor of most present members of that family. Another daughter of Theden, Sophie Frederica, married his fellow medic, freemason and rosicrucian J.C.A Mayer, discoverer of fingerprints and son of the astronomer professor Andreas Mayer.

== Memberships ==
- Member of the Kaiserlich Leopoldinisch-Carolinischen Deutschen Akademie der Naturwissenschaftler (now known as the Leopoldina)
- Freemasonry: 1765 Member of the Strict Observance. From 1765-1767 he was Master of the Three Circle Lodge ("Zu den drei Zirkeln") in Stettin. In Berlin he was Master of the "Zur Eintracht" Lodge from 1771-1784, likewise of the Motherlodge "Three Globes" ("Zu den drei Weltkugeln") from 1784-1794, after which he was Grand Master of the Scottish Rite ("altschottischer Obermeister"). A masonic medal was struck in his honour.
