= Möllendorf =

Noble family

The Möllendorf family (also: Möllendorff, Moellendorff) has been prominent German noble family in the history of Brandenburg and Prussia. The von Wilamowitz-Moellendorff family descends from an adopted son (born Wilamowitz) of a member of the Möllendorf family.

== History ==
In 1427 two members of the family are mentioned in a list of Privy Councillors of the Margraviate of Brandenburg who signed a treaty with Pomerania: "Jaspar Gans zu Putlitz, Achim Gans his son, Herr Hans v. Quitzow, Bernd Rohr, Hans v. Rohr Old Otto von Blumenthal, Ebel v. Möllendorf, Beteke v. Kehrberg, Kone v. Retzdorff, Achim v. Möllendorf"

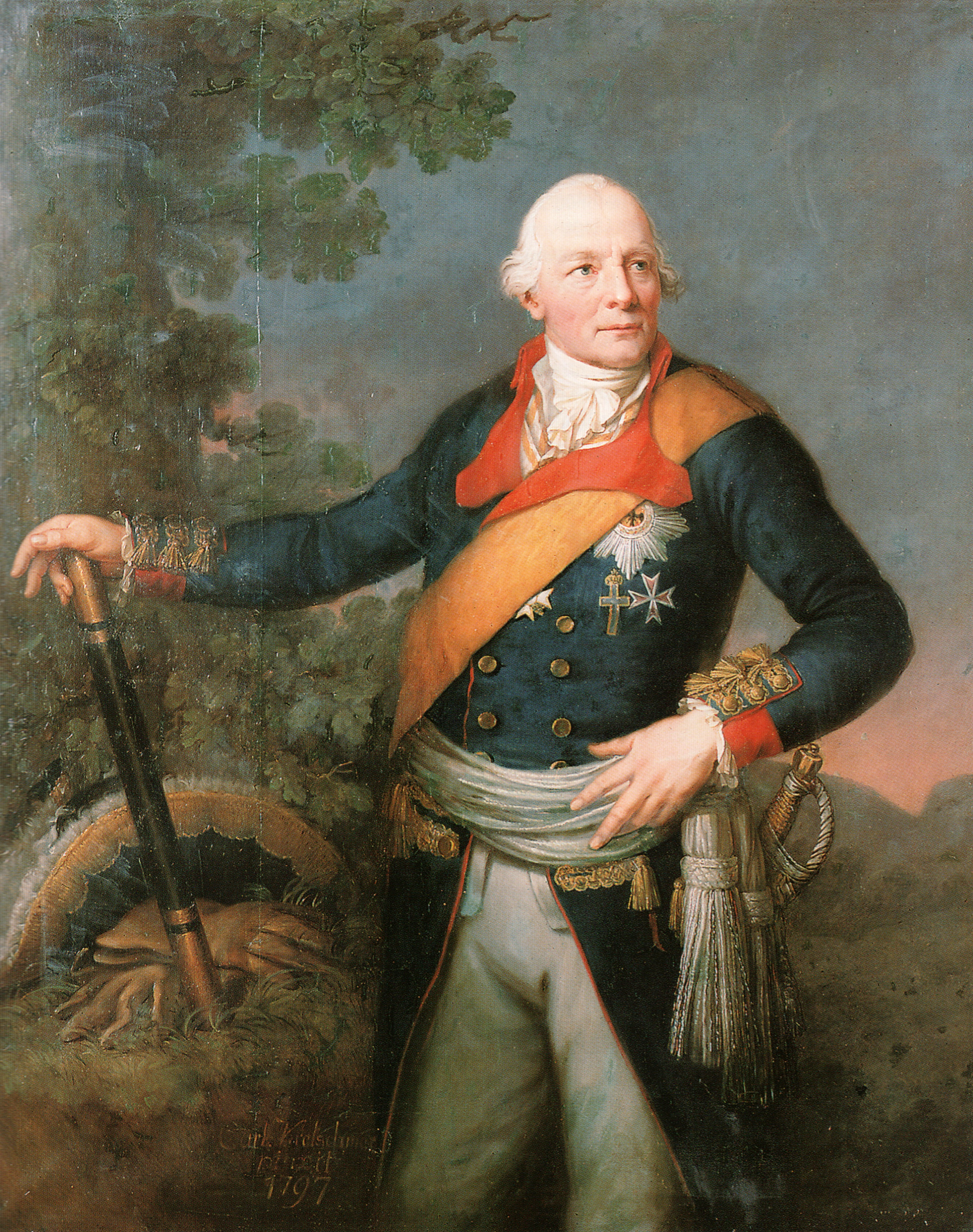
Field Marshal Wichard von Möllendorf

Wichard Joachim Heinrich von Möllendorf (1724–1816) distinguished himself as an officer at the battles of Leuthen, Hochkirch and Torgau, and as a major-general at Burkersdorf and Brix. He became Governor of Berlin in 1783, and General in 1787. In 1793 he was promoted to Generalfeldmarschall (Field Marshal), but was now too old for hard campaigns. He was captured at Auerstädt (1806). He died in 1816.

In retirement he adopted three great-grandsons of one of his sisters, Hugo, Ottocar and Arnold von Wilamowitz. Their descendants, also distinguished, are called von Wilamowitz-Moellendorff. Classical philologist Ulrich von Wilamowitz-Moellendorff (1848–1931) was a member of this family.

Another member of the family, Johann Karl Wolf Dietrich von Moellendorff (1791–1860) was born at his father's estate Rheinsberg, entered military service during the Napoleonic wars and was captured at the retreat after the Battle of Auerstädt. From 1810 he served in the Guards in Potsdam, and distinguished himself at the conquest of Paris in 1814. In 1848 he was Major-General and commander of a brigade in Berlin responsible for the protection of the Royal Palace on March 18 (see Revolutions of 1848 in the German states). He retired from active duty in 1857.

Paul Georg von Möllendorff (1847–1901) was a German linguist and diplomat.

Otto Franz von Möllendorff (1848–1903) was a German scientist, a malacologist.

Willi von Möllendorf (1872–1934) was a composer of quarter tone music.

Wichard Georg Otto von Moellendorff (1881–1937) was a German engineer and economist born in Hong Kong as the son of Consul Otto von Moellendorff.

In the Nazi era Horst von Möllendorff (1906-1992) was a popular cartoonist.

Ulrike von Möllendorff (born 1939) is a German journalist.
