= Garel =

Middle High German Arthurian romance by Der Pleier

Garel von dem blühenden Tal (English: Garel of the Flowering Valley) is a Middle High German Arthurian romance composed by Der Pleier around 1230-40. It appears to have been written in contradiction to Der Stricker's Daniel von Blumenthal. It consists of 21,310 lines in rhyming couplets; the beginning is missing. The story is illustrated in frescoes to be found at Runkelstein Castle in South Tyrol.

After a journey, King Arthur receives a declaration of war from King Ekunaver. Garel von Blumenthal leaves Arthur's court in order to raise troops for the war. On the way various adventures befall him, amongst which he lays siege to the castle of Sir Eskilabon, who had taken several knights prisoner, and frees many prisoners from the power of two giants. By killing the gruesome monster Vulganus he wins the hand of the beautiful Laudamie. Garel then gains a victory over Ekunaver before Arthur even arrives with his army. His success is celebrated in a banquet at the Round Table, before which he marries Laudamie.

== Sources ==
- Tax, Petrus W. (1991). "Der Pleier". In Lacy, Norris J., The New Arthurian Encyclopedia, pp. 362–363. New York: Garland. ISBN 0-8240-4377-4.
