= Runkelstein Castle =

Medieval fortification in South Tyrol, Italy

Coordinates: 46°31′02″N 11°21′32″E

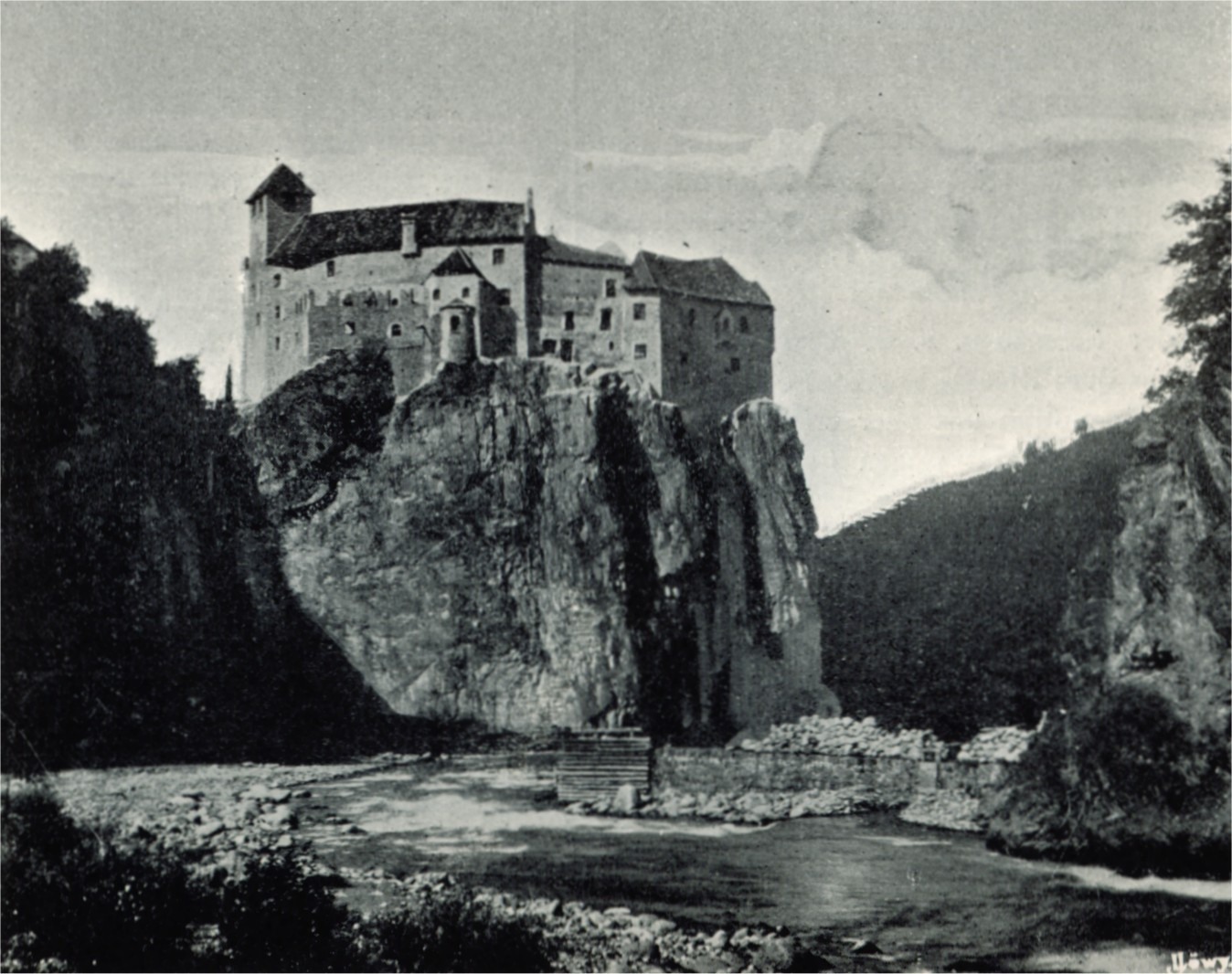
Runkelstein Castle after Emperor Franz Josefs restoration 1880

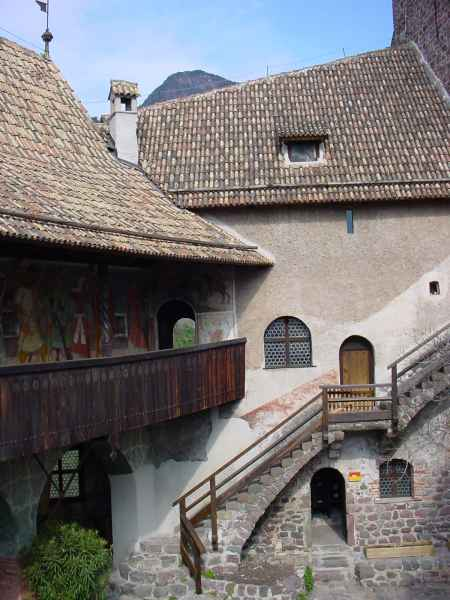
Inner courtyard of the castle

Runkelstein Castle (German: Schloss Runkelstein; Italian: Castel Roncolo) is a medieval fortification on a rocky spur in the territory of Ritten, near the city of Bolzano in South Tyrol, Italy. In 1237 Alderich, Prince-Bishop of Trent, gave the brothers Friedrich and Beral, Lords of Wangen, permission to construct a castle on the rock then called Runchenstayn.

== History ==
In 1277 it was damaged during a siege by Meinhard II of Tirol who, after winning the war against Heinrich Prince-Bishop of Trent, entrusted the castle to Gottschalk Knoger of Bozen. In 1385 Niklaus and Franz Vintler, wealthy merchant brothers from Bozen, bought the castle. Niklaus was counselor and financier of the Count of Tyrol, Leopold III, Duke of Austria, which allowed them to buy the castle, a type of residence unfitting – in those times – for people of their rank. The brothers Vintler commissioned a vast restructuring of the castle: a new defence wall, moat, a cistern and more rooms were built. In 1390 the construction of the Summer House began. The house was painted with frescos, for which the castle is most famous today, inside and outside. The frescos' topics were of a literary nature, depicting for example King Arthur and his knights, Tristan and Isolde, and Dietrich von Bern. The family also commissioned the frescoes in the Western and Eastern Palace. They were created by an unknown master and some of them depict scenes from Pleier′s romance Garel.

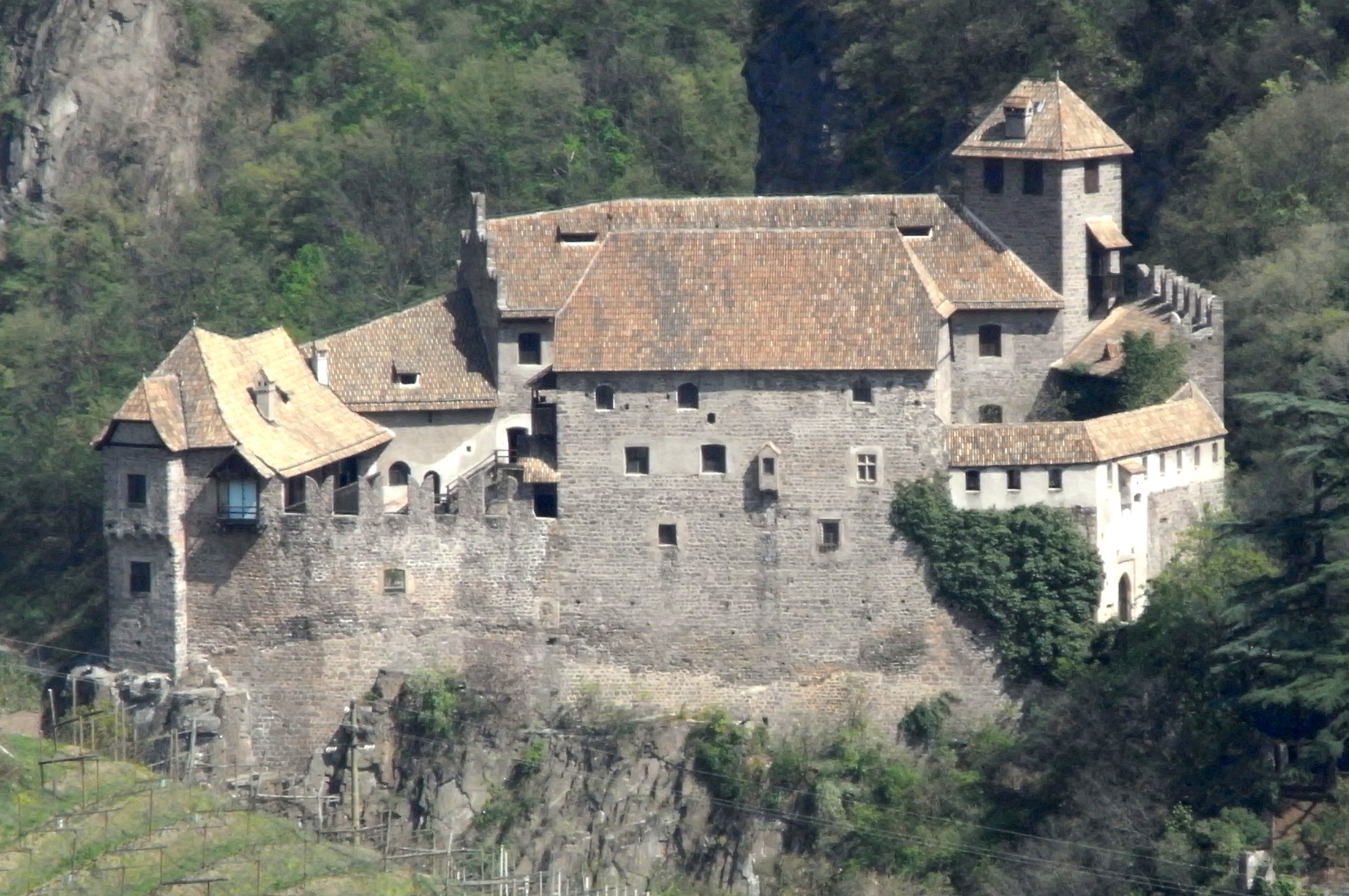
The Castle in 2009

In 1407 the monetary conflict between Frederick IV, Duke of Austria "mit der leeren Tasche" (with empty pocket), Count of Tyrol and wealthy Tyrolean noble families resulted in open war. The Vintlers were drawn into these disputes and Runkelstein was besieged. Niklaus, who had allied himself with the nobles in the "Hawk League" lost all his wealth and possessions. His brother Franz, who had allied with the Duke remained owner of the Castle until Sigismund, Archduke of Austria "der Münzreiche" (rich with coins) acquired it.

The Habsburg family owned the castle until 1530. Holy Roman Emperor Maximilian I gave orders to renovate the castle. He furnished his apartment and commissioned a restoration of the frescos. He also ordered his Coat of Arms to be prominently displayed in the castle. Around 1500 Maximilian gave the castle to his vassal Georg von Frundsberg, famous "Father of the Landsknechte". Frundsberg entrusted the care of the castle to a vicar. In 1520 the powder magazine on the groundfloor of the tower exploded. The explosion damaged parts of the outer wall, entrance and Eastern Palace and destroyed the tower. Afterwards the castle was neglected until King Ferdinand I bestowed it in 1530 to Sigmund von Brandis, Knight Commander of Bozen.

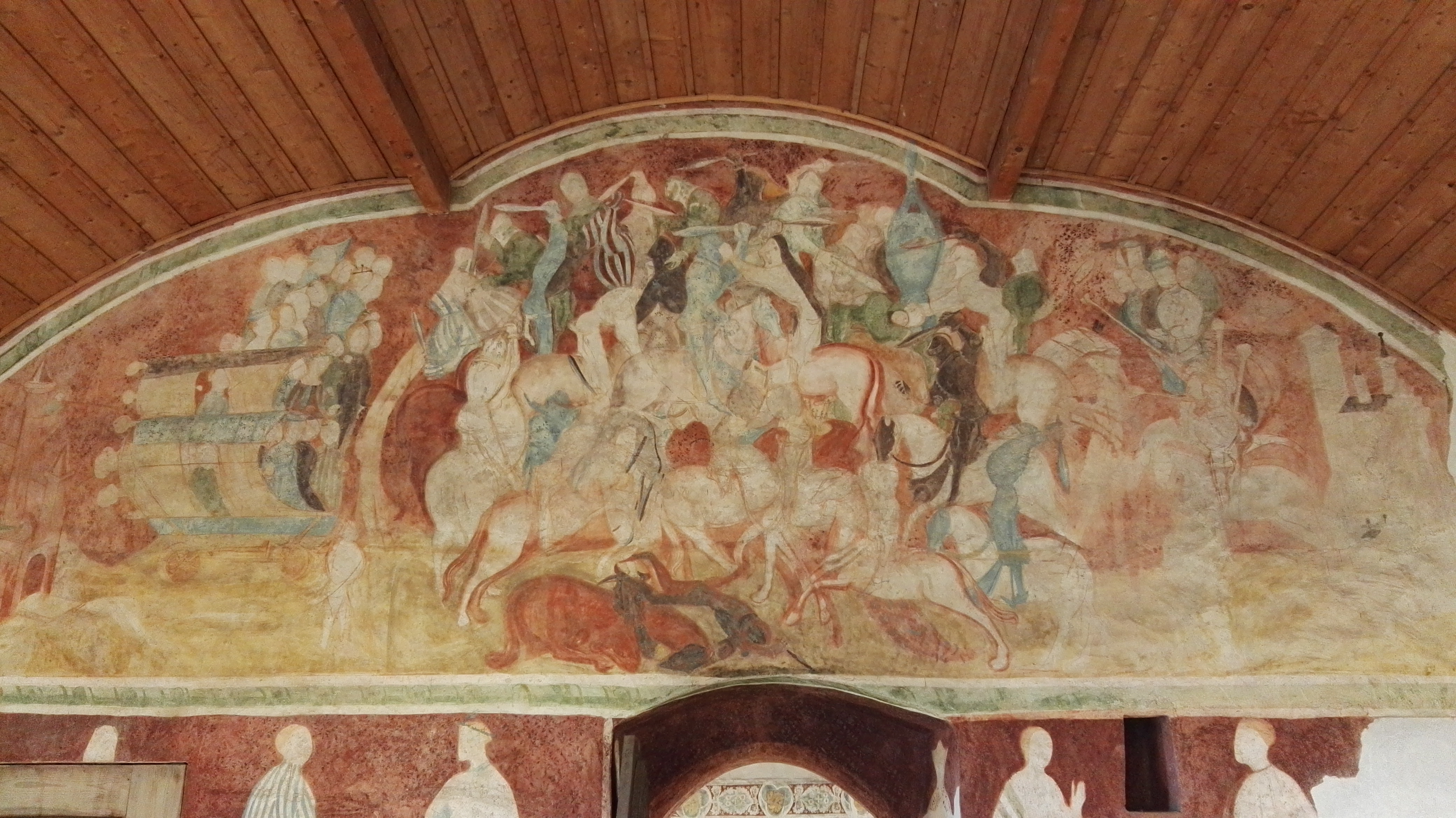
Frescoes depicting heroic legends inside the castle

Later the Prince-Bishop of Trent obtained the castle anew and Prince-Bishop Bernhard von Cles gave it as a fief to the Counts of Liechtenstein-Kastelkorn. In 1672 a fire destroyed the eastern palace, which was never rebuilt. In 1759 the last Liechtenstein-Kastelkorn gave back the fief to the Trentine bishops. At the time the castle was in grave decay.

During the Romanticism period in the early nineteenth century romanticists rediscovered Runkelstein. Johann Joseph von Görres, a German writer, was the first to come and was soon followed by the many artists in the service of King Ludwig I of Bavaria. In this time the castle became a symbol for the Romantic period. In 1868, the northern wall of the Summer House collapsed, but in 1880 the castle's fortunes changed: Archduke Johann Salvator of Austria-Tuscany bought Runkelstein and gave it as a gift to Emperor Franz Josef in 1882. The emperor commissioned Friedrich von Schmidt to restore the Castle and after the restoration donated it to the city of Bozen in 1893. The last restoration, including a careful restoration of the frescos was carried out in the late 1990s.
