= National Association of Local Councils =

- Abbreviation: NALC
- Founded: 1947
- Region served: England
- Chief executive: Jonathan Owen
- Chair: Cllr Iain Hamilton
- Website: https://www.nalc.gov.uk

The National Association of Local Councils (NALC) is a membership organisation representing the interests of local (parish and town) councils in England. NALC works in partnership with county associations and the Society of Local Council Clerks to support, promote and improve local councils. One Voice Wales is the equivalent body covering community and town councils in Wales.

Established in 1947, by Charles Arnold-Baker, after leaving the Admiralty Division, he accepted a post as secretary of the National Association of Parish Councils. He transformed this body into the union of all rural local councils in England and Wales, the National Association of Local Councils.

NALC is run on a democratic structure. Local councils are members of NALC and their county association. Each county association appoints one elected councillor from their local councils to sit on National Assembly. National Assembly is responsible for the appointment of NALC committees, as well as the management and conduct of NALC.

A local council is a universal term for community, neighbourhood, parish and town councils. They are the first tier of local government and are statutory bodies.

NALC provide a national voice for local councils across England. They campaign on their behalf, raise awareness of their work and provide them with a range of services to support their needs. In July 2024, NALC called for greater powers for town and parish councils, greater funding opportunities and the promotion of civility and respect

They provide several services:

- Campaigning – lobby for the issues that are important to local councils and communicate those views to the government and a range of influential organisations in the private, charity and public sectors.
- Legal, accounts and audit advice – Written, telephone and digital advice from NALC solicitors.
- Publications – Guides on being a good councillor, employer, finance and transparency, neighbourhood planning and a range of toolkits.
- Conferences, events and training.
- Publicity – Raise the profile of local councils and the sector beyond a regional level
- Media – Guidance on how to deal with a media crisis, how to deal with reporters and media outlets and writing a media policy.
- Standards, awards and recognition

NALC also provides the Secretariat for the All-Party Parliamentary Group on Local Democracy, currently co-chaired by Cherilyn Mackrory MP for Truro and Falmouth, and Richard Holden MP for North West Durham.

The head office is based at 109 Great Russell Street in Bloomsbury, central London.

== Star Council Awards ==
In 2015, NALC launched an annual awards programme to recognise the work of the sector. The award categories have varied slightly over the years, each is an "of the year" award i.e. 'Councillor of the Year'

2015
Council	Councillor	Young Councillor	County Association Project	Chair	Clerk	Local Council Project	Council Worker	Digital Communications
Frome Town Council	Derek Ailes. Chrishall Parish Council	Alex Collier, Cottenham Parish Council	Hertfordshire	Jane Saltmarsh, Woodham Ferrers and Bicknacre Parish Council	Debra Roberts, Feock Parish Council	Oswestry Town Council	Allan Moffat, Bracknell Town Council	Stone Parish Council

2016/17
Year	Council	Councillor	Young Councillor	County Association Project	Clerk	Local Council Project
2016	Oswestry Town Council	Helen Ogden, Westerham Town Council	Sarah Cursons Leighton-Linslade Town Council	Dorset	Susan Wilthew, Chippenham Town Council	Condover Parish Council
2017	Halewood Town Council	Mike Brownlow, Bruton Town Council	Kellie Hinton, Henley on Thames Town Council	Kent	Mark Williams, Falmouth Town Council	Barrow Gurney Parish Council

2018-2023
Year	Council	Councillor	Young Councillor	County Association Project	Clerk
2018	Northwich Town Council	Nick Penny, Coleford Town Council	Mellissa Boyden Asfordby Parish Council	West Sussex	Jayne Cooper Gnosall Parish Council
2019	Woughton Community Council	Sarah Williams Bridport Town Council	Daniel Thomas Much Wenlock Town Council	Northamptonshire	Donna Ford Midsomer Norton Town Council
2021	Farnham Town Council	Matthew Walsh Princes Risborough Town Council	Michaella Biscomb Kippax Parish Council	Yorkshire	Adam Keppel-Green Knutsford Town Council
2022	Alcester Town Council	Jeremy Richardson, Cold Norton Parish Council	Stafan Heighway Great Dawley Town Council	Northamptonshire	Terry Philpott, Ware Town Council
2023	Braunstone Town Council	Lorna Berrett, North Hinksey Parish Council	Cameron Palin, East Cowes Town Council	Essex	Andrea Mann, Odiham Parish Council
