= Der Pleier =

German poet

Der Pleier is the pen name of a 13th-century German poet whose real name is unknown. Three of his works survive, all Middle High German romances on Arthurian subjects: Garel, Tandareis und Flordibel, and Meleranz. Little else is known of him, but he was an important figure in the revival of Arthurian literature in Germany in the mid-13th century, after decades of declining interest in the subject.

== Name and biography ==
Der Pleier was active between around 1240 and 1270. His real name is unknown. The meaning of his pseudonym is also unknown, though it may mean "The Blower," as in glassblower, and may refer to his tendency to break down old material and reforge it, much as a glassblower melts down old material to shape it into something new. Textual evidence in his work implies he may have been from Austria, perhaps the area around Salzburg. He had a broad knowledge of German Arthurian literature, and most of his work takes plots, scenes, and especially characters from older romances.

== Works ==
Der Pleier is best known for his longest work, Garel von dem blühenden Tal, consisting of 21,310 lines in short rhyming couplets. The story follows King Arthur's young knight Garel on his adventures through the territory of Ekunaver of Kanadic, who has declared war on Arthur. Garel defeats hostile knights and rescues friendly ones, and amasses a vast army as he moves. He frees Queen Laudamie of Anferre from the evil Vulganus and marries her, and uses his army to conquer Ekunaver before Arthur even arrives. A truce is settled, and the romance concludes with a festival celebrating the reconciliation. The poem was written as a reaction to a previous work, Daniel von dem blühenden Tal by Der Stricker. Apparently disliking the brutality of the warrior ideal exemplified by Der Stricker's tale and protagonist, Der Pleier specifically designed his hero as a virtuous, chivalrous knight appealing to the courtly ethos of the time.

Tandareis und Flordibel, which consists of 18,339 short lines chiefly in rhymed couplets, tells the story of the love between the young Tandareis and the foreign princess Flordibel, who forced Arthur to promise her that he’ll slew anyone who would try to marry her, thinking that she’ll never fall in love. When Arthur discovers their illicit love, he tries to keep his promise with the princess, therefore he attacks them until Gawain establishes a truce which ends the fighting and sends Tandareis on a quest to prove himself as a real knight. Meleranz, consisting of 12,834 lines in short rhyming couplets, concerns the adventures of the titular squire as he attempts to find his way back to his lady love, Tydomie of Kameric.

Der Pleier adapted much of his material from older poems, but there is no corroborating evidence for his claims of direct French sources. His romances borrow from the older German Arthurian authors Wolfram von Eschenbach, Gottfried von Strassburg, and Hartmann von Aue, as well as lesser-known ones such as Der Stricker and Wirnt von Grafenberg. Most of his characters appear in earlier works, especially the genealogies in Wolfram von Eschenbach's Parzival and Titurel, which he greatly expands and adapts. Der Pleier's stories appealed to audiences familiar with the older works, and revived flagging interest in the Arthurian legend in German literature in his time. Their popularity is attested by the murals in Runkelstein Castle, created around 1400, which depict scenes from Garel.
