= Parish council (England) =

Elected corporate bodies responsible for local government in English civil parishes

Map of civil parishes in England as of December 2021

A parish council is a civil local authority found in England, which is the lowest tier of local government. Parish councils are elected corporate bodies, with variable tax raising powers, and they carry out beneficial public activities in geographical areas known as civil parishes. There are about 10,480 parish and town councils in England. Parish councils may be known by different styles, they may resolve to call themselves a town council, village council, community council, neighbourhood council, or if the parish has city status, it may call itself a city council. However their powers and duties are the same whatever name they carry.

Parish councils receive the majority of their funding by levying a precept upon the council tax paid by the residents of the parish (or parishes) covered by the council. In 2021-22 the amount raised by precept was £616 million. Other funding may be obtained by local fund-raising or grants for specific activities. They can vary enormously in size, activities and circumstances; representing populations ranging from fewer than 100 (small rural hamlets) to up to 130,000 (Northampton Town Council). Most of them are small: around 80% represent populations of less than 2,500; Parish councils are made up of unpaid councillors who are elected to serve for four years: there are about 70,000 parish councillors country-wide.

Not every civil parish has a parish council. Smaller ones, typically those with fewer than 150 electors, often have parish meetings instead, which can fulfil many of the functions of a parish council. Alternatively, parishes with small populations may be grouped together with one or more neighbouring parishes under a single grouped parish council.

Civil parish councils were formed in England under the reforming Local Government Act 1894 (56 & 57 Vict. c. 73) to take over local oversight of civic duties in rural towns and villages from the vestry committee. Parish councils are generically referred to as "local councils" to distinguish them from "principal councils" (e.g. district councils, county councils, unitary authorities or London borough councils) and most are affiliated via County Associations to the National Association of Local Councils (NALC), which represents their interests at a national level.

Polls under parish councils and parish meetings are governed by the Parish and Community Meetings (Polls) Rules 1987 (SI 1987/1).

== Powers and duties ==
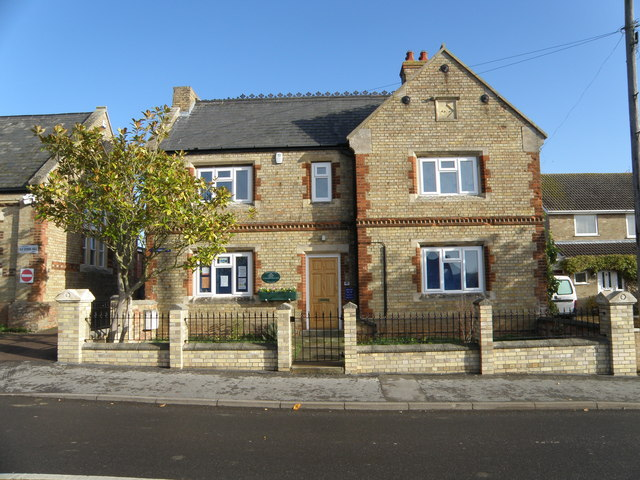
A parish office, Sawtry. Only larger parishes have these.

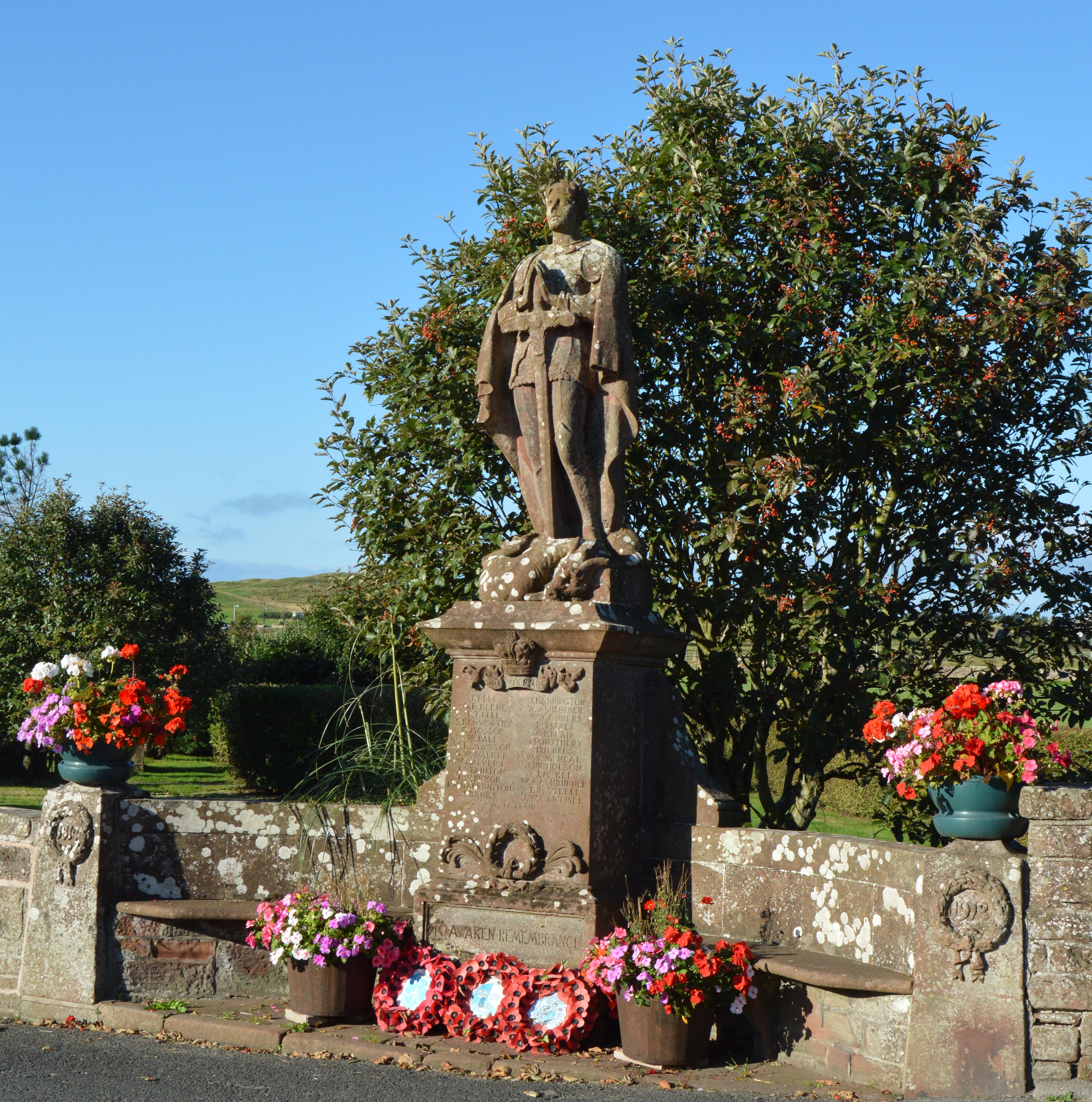
War Memorial looked after by St Bees Parish Council

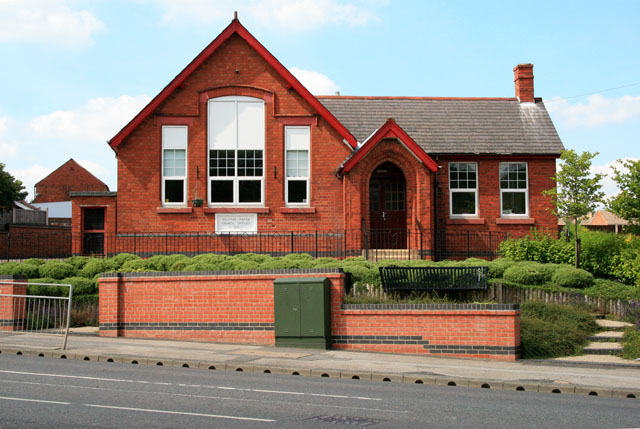
Parish council office and hall, Selston

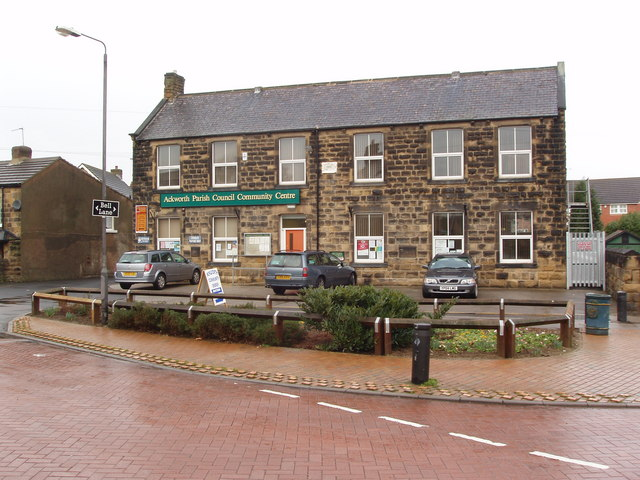
A parish council community centre, Ackworth, West Yorkshire

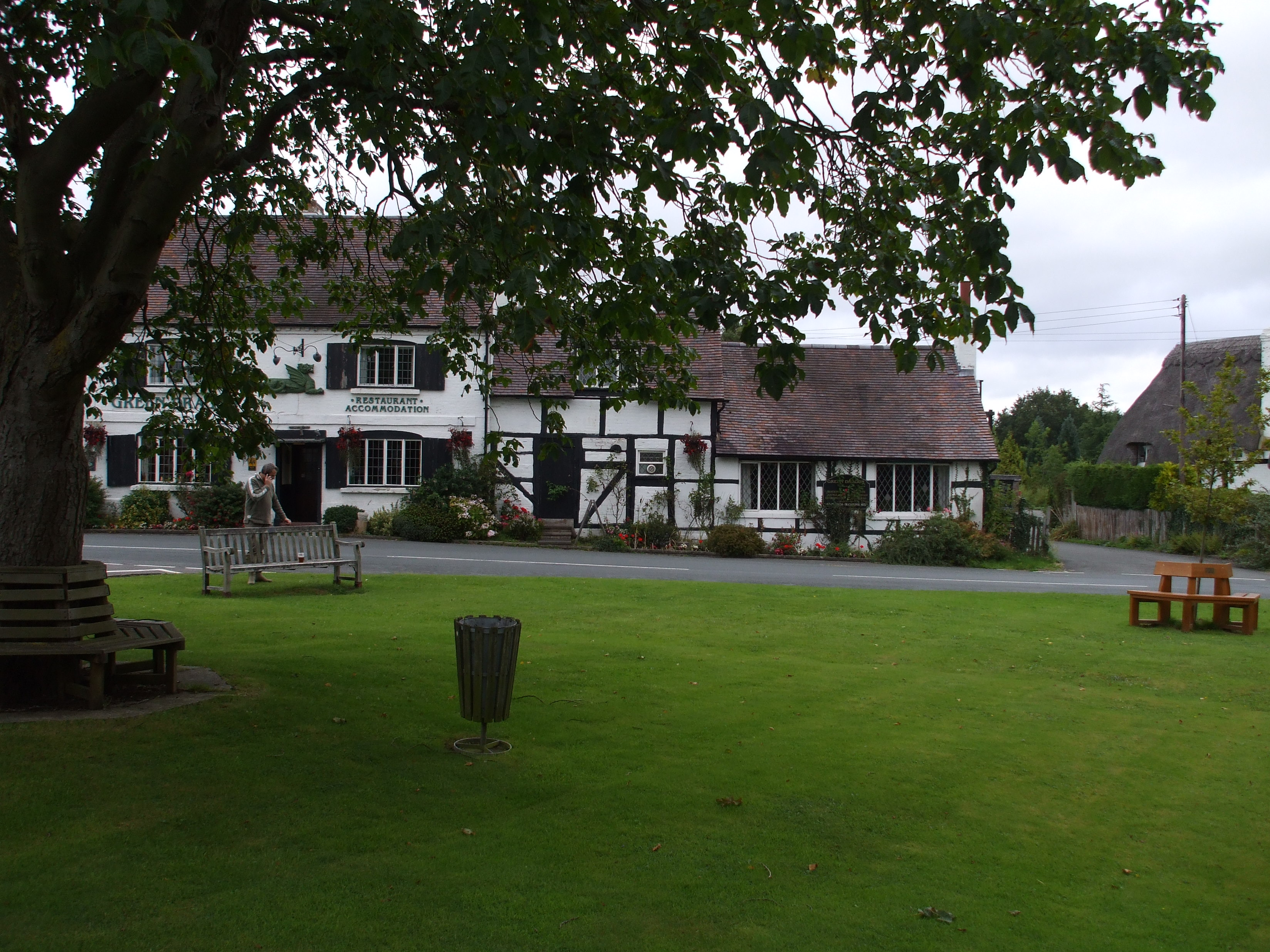
Sambourne village green, Warwickshire. Parish councils are quite often the custodians of common land and village greens.

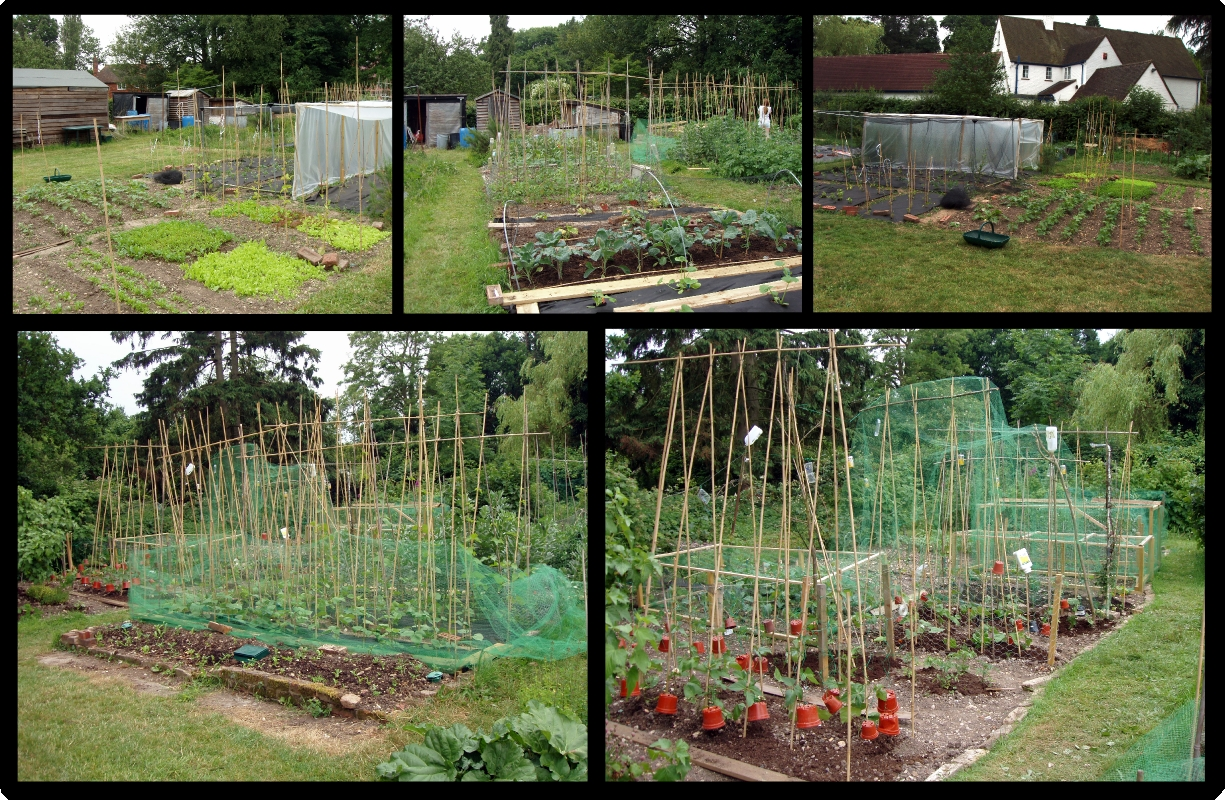
Allotments in the rural village of Jordans, Buckinghamshire.

Their activities fall into three main categories: representing the local community, delivering services to meet local needs, and improving quality of life and community well being.

Parish councils have the power to tax their residents to support their operations and to carry out local projects, and this is done through the council tax system. Although there is no limit to the amount that can be raised, the money can only be raised for a limited number of purposes, listed below, as defined in the 1894 Act and subsequent legislation. Compared to higher tiers of English local government, parish councils have very few statutory duties (i.e. things they are required to do by law) but have a much more extensive range of discretionary powers which they may exercise voluntarily. For this reason, there are large variations in the activities of parish councils, depending on their size, resources and abilities. The "General Power of Competence" is a power awarded in 2012 to eligible councils, which further broadens the scope of activities that councils can be involved in.

=== Duty to provide facilities ===
- Duty to consider providing allotment gardens if demand unsatisfied.

=== Powers to provide facilities ===
Parish councils may exercise powers to provide, maintain and manage certain facilities. There are large variations in the facilities provided by parish councils, but they can include any of the following:

- Buildings for community use, such as village halls, town halls or community centres
- Recreational facilities such as parks, playgrounds, playing fields and swimming baths
- Cemeteries and crematoria
- Litter bins
- Public seats
- Public toilets
- Public clocks
- Cycle and motorcycle parking
- Maintenance of rights of way
- Guardianship of common land (such as village greens)
- Maintenance of war memorials

They may also provide the following, subject to the consent of the county council, unitary authority or London borough council of the area in which they lie:

- Bus shelters
- Lighting of roads and public places
- Off-street car parks
- Certain traffic signs and other public notices
- Provision, maintenance and protection of roadside verges
- Establishment or acquisition of markets, and provision of market places and market buildings

=== Consultative powers ===
Parish councils have the statutory right to be consulted by the local district, borough, county council or unitary authority on:

- All planning applications in their areas
- Intention to provide a burial ground in the parish
- Proposals to carry out sewerage works
- Footpath and bridleway (more generally, 'rights of way') surveys
- Intention to make byelaws in relation to hackney carriages, music and dancing, promenades, sea shore and street naming
- The appointment of governors of primary schools

=== Miscellaneous powers ===
Parish councils may also exercise the following powers:

- Sponsoring public events
- Support of the arts and provision of entertainment
- Encouragement of tourism
- Providing grants to local voluntary organisations
- Funding crime prevention measures
- Providing grants for bus services, and funding community transport schemes
- Contribution of money towards traffic calming schemes
- Cleaning and drainage of ponds, watercourses and ditches
- Power to obtain water from any well, spring or stream
- Creation of a neighbourhood plan
- Power to acquire or dispose of land
- Withholding of consent to stop up unclassified highways and footpaths
- Appointing trustees of local charities
- Power to make byelaws in regard to pleasure grounds, cycle parks, baths and washhouses, open spaces and burial grounds, and mortuaries and post-mortem rooms.
- Under the Environment Act 2021, public authorities (including town and parish councils) operating in England must consider what they can do to conserve and enhance biodiversity.

=== General power of competence ===
Under the Localism Act 2011 eligible parish councils can be granted a "general power of competence" (GPC) which allows them within certain limits the freedom to do anything an individual can do provided it is not prohibited by other legislation, as opposed to being limited to the powers explicitly granted to them by law. To be eligible for this a parish council must meet certain conditions, such as at least two-thirds of the councillors being elected as opposed to being co-opted or appointed, and having a clerk with suitable qualifications. However, such activities cannot use precept funding, and specific funding must be obtained from other sources.

In principle the GPC can allow councils to engage in a range of activities such as setting up a trading company or co-operative to operate commercial activities, such as lending or investing money, or running a local shop, post office or energy company. Or allow it to contribute towards the provision of a service by another authority.

== Meetings ==
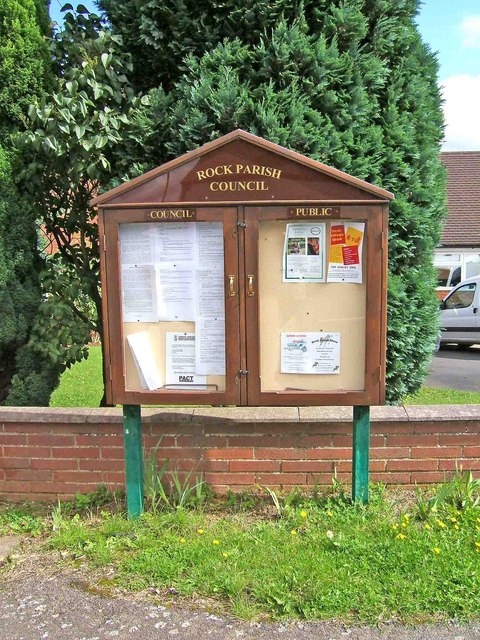
A typical parish notice board, which is the usual "noticeable place" where official notices are posted.

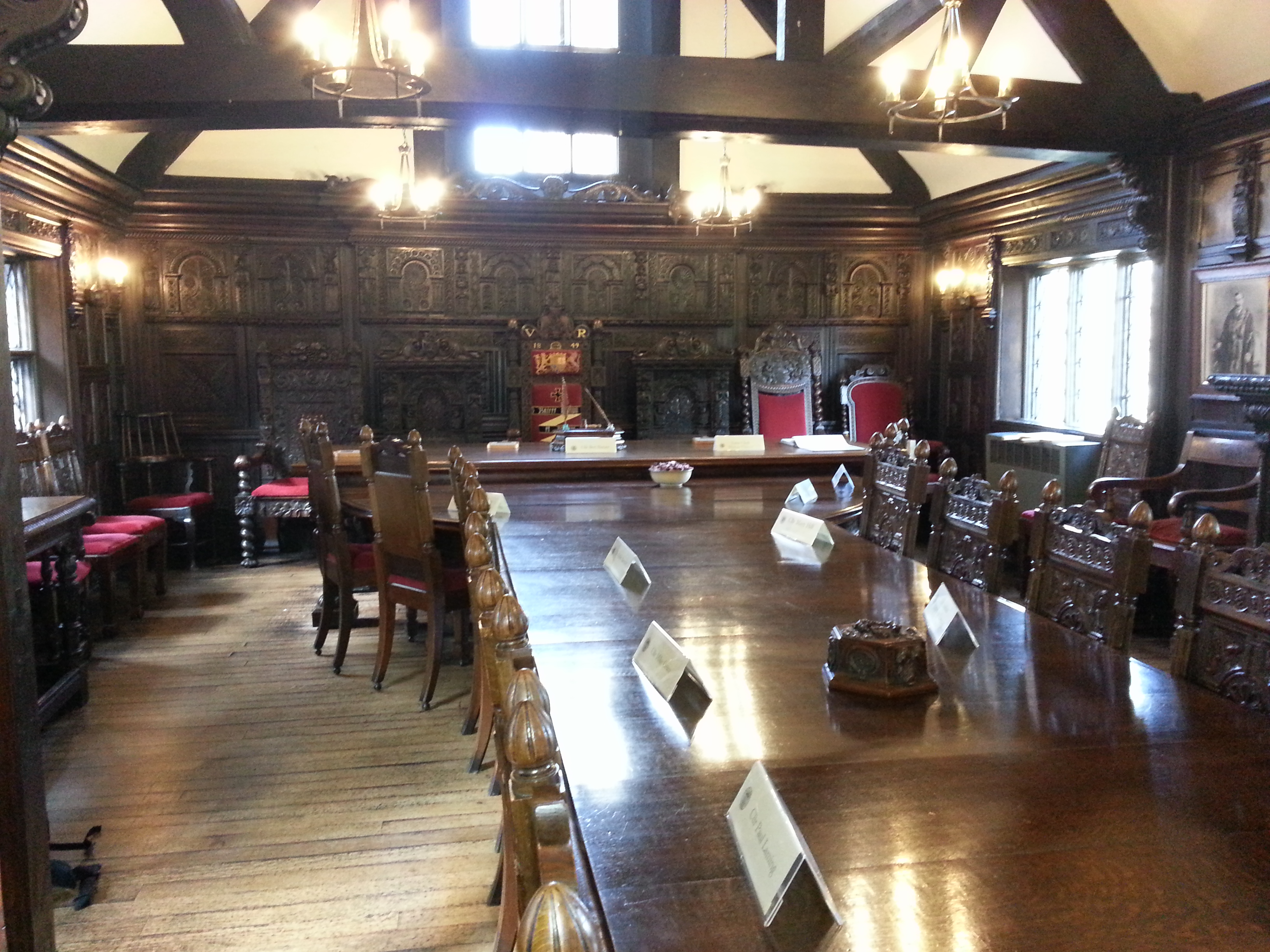
The historic council chamber, Much Wenlock, dating from 1577 and still in use today by the town council

The central function of the council, the making of local decisions and policy relevant to the public interest of the parish, is performed at the meetings of the council. A parish council must hold an annual meeting and at least three other meetings in a year; however, monthly meetings are the most common, and some larger councils have fortnightly meetings. An extraordinary meeting may be called at any time by the chairman or members, but due notice must be given.

A parish council consists of no fewer than five elected parish councillors, including the chairman, and a quorum of the main council committee is at least one-third of the members, or three members, whichever is the greater. Every meeting is open to the public, who are encouraged to attend, except for those items where the council formally resolves to exclude the public and press on the grounds that publicity would be prejudicial to the public interest. This would have to be due to the confidential nature of the business. This latter also applies to any subcommittee of the parish council.

A council can form committees with delegated powers for specific purposes; however these must adhere to the protocols for public attendance, minute-taking and notice of meetings that apply to the full council. A committee may form sub-committees. A council can also appoint advisory groups which are exempt from these constraints to give flexibility, but these have no delegated powers and cannot make financial decisions. Such groups may contain members who are not councillors.

Public notice of meetings of the council and its committees must be given at least three clear days (Note: (LGA 1972 Part 2s10(2)). Legal definition of three clear days. The day on which the notice was issued or posted, the day of the meeting, a Sunday, a day of the Christmas break or a bank holiday or a day appointed for public thanks giving or mourning shall not count towards the three clear days.) before and be displayed in a "noticeable place" in the parish, giving time, date and venue. A summons to attend the meeting is also issued, specifying the agenda, to every member of the council. Items not on the agenda cannot be formally debated or resolved. Items brought up by the attendance of the general public or in correspondence can be discussed, but formal resolutions on these must be deferred if they are not covered by the existing agenda to the next meeting so that due notice can be given. It is common practice to have a "public participation" item at the beginning of the agenda so that the public knows the time when this will occur.

The minutes of the meeting are taken by the clerk, and are ratified at the next meeting of the council. They must also be displayed in a noticeable place in the parish, and for many councils, they are now also displayed on the Internet.

Procedures for the conduct of meetings are set out in schedule 12 of the Local Government Act 1972, and where this is not overridden by legislation, by the standing orders of the council. Most adopt the National Association of Local Councils (NALC) model standing orders.

Councillors are expected to adhere to the "Nolan principles" of conduct in public life.

== Administration ==
The administration of the council is managed by its clerk, a paid employee appointed by the council, who acts in a combined statutory role of Proper Officer (secretary or chief executive) and Responsible Financial Officer (treasurer). They may be full-time or part-time, depending on the amount of council business, and large parish councils may require more than one official for these tasks, in which case they are a group led by the clerk.

The clerk as the Proper Officer "enacts" (cause to happen) the decisions of the council, and they receive official correspondence and issue correspondence on the instructions of the council. The clerk also prepares agendas for meetings of the council and its committees, gives notice of these to the council members and the public, and records and publishes the minutes of these meetings. The clerk is the formal point of contact with the public, and a source of information for the public about the council's activities.

The necessary financial monitoring and reporting are the clerk's responsibility, and in this role the clerk is known as the "Responsible Financial Officer" (RFO) of the Council.

The clerk also provides procedural guidance for the council itself, and ensures that statutory and other provisions governing or affecting the running of the council are observed. Clerks are encouraged to have a formal qualification, such as the Certificate in Local Council Administration (CiLCA).

A councillor cannot become the paid clerk of their council, due to conflict of interest, but they can be appointed on an unpaid basis; preferably temporarily. A councillor cannot become a paid clerk until 12 months after leaving office.

== Elections and membership ==
The cycle of parish council elections is four years, and councillors are elected by the block vote system, with voters having the same number of votes as seats on the council, in a secret ballot. Those candidates with the highest number of votes sufficient to fill the number of vacant seats are elected. The legislation provides that the number of elected members of a parish council shall not be less than five. Larger parishes may be divided into parish wards, with separate elections for each ward.

The timing of the election cycle is usually linked to that of the election of a district councillor for the ward containing the parish. Where the elections to a district council are delayed or cancelled (e.g due to its abolishment with the formation of a unitary council or a change from elections by thirds to the whole council), the term of a parish council may be extended to match the next elections to the new authority.

A candidate must be at least 18 years old and at least one of the following:

- A British citizen, an eligible Commonwealth citizen
- Citizen of Ireland
- Citizen of any member state of the European Union

and candidates must state on their consent for nomination form their qualification for election, which must be at least one of the following:

- they are a registered elector of the parish
- during the whole of the 12 months before the day of nomination and the day of election they have occupied, either as owner or tenant, any land or other premises in the parish.
- their main or only place of work is in the parish during the whole of the 12 months before the day of nomination and the day of election.
- they have lived within 4.8 kilometres (3 miles) of the parish boundary for 12 months before the day of nomination and the day of election.

The chairman of the previous council shall remain in office, even if not elected to the newly constituted council, until a new chairman is appointed at the first meeting of the new council.

=== Uncontested elections ===
Where there are an equal number or fewer candidates than there are vacancies, all candidates are elected unopposed, and no poll is taken. Where there are fewer candidates than vacant seats, the parish council has the power to coopt any person or persons to fill the vacancies. This power, however, may only be exercised if there is a quorum of councillors present and within 35 days of the election.

If the parish council fails to fill the vacancies within this period, the district council may dissolve it and order fresh elections. If there is not a quorum elected the district council must dissolve it and order fresh elections.

=== Contested elections ===
Where there are more candidates than vacancies, a poll must be held. Undivided parishes, or multi-member parish wards, hold elections under the block vote system.

=== Casual vacancies ===
If a vacancy occurs during the term of a parish council, it may be filled by either election or co-option. Elections only occur if, following the advertisement of the vacancy for 14 days, 10 electors send a written request to the returning officer. If no request is received, the parish council will be required to fill the vacancies by co-option. If vacancy occurs within 6 months of a scheduled election, then a by-election cannot be called, but the council has the power to co-opt. The nomination qualifications required of a candidate for co-option are the same as for those for election.

If the number of vacancies on the parish council is such that there is no longer a quorum, the district council may temporarily appoint persons to bring the council up to strength in the interval prior to an election.

== History ==
Civil parish councils were formed in England under the reforming Local Government Act 1894 (56 & 57 Vict. c. 73) to take over local oversight of civic duties in rural towns and villages. The act created two new types of local authority, parish councils and district councils, to rationalise the large number of bodies which existed for a variety of activities such as public health, secular burials, water supply and drainage. It also finally removed secular duties from the local vestry committees and gave them to the new parish councils.

An idea of the scope of this huge re-organisation can be gained from the words of H. H. Fowler, President of the Local Government Board, who said in the parliamentary debate for the 1894 act:

"62 counties, 302 Municipal Boroughs, 31 Improvement Act Districts, 688 Local Government Districts, 574 Rural Sanitary Districts, 58 Port Sanitary Districts, 2,302 School Board Districts ... 1,052 Burial Board Districts, 648 Poor Law Unions, 13,775 Ecclesiastical Parishes, and nearly 15,000 Civil Parishes. The total number of Authorities which tax the English ratepayers is between 28,000 and 29,000. Not only are we exposed to this multiplicity of authority and this confusion of rating power, but the qualification, tenure, and mode of election of members of these Authorities differ in different cases."

The government chose the civil parish as the basic unit of local government in rural areas. Each parish council's area of responsibility was a geographical area known as a civil parish. The civil parishes were also grouped to form rural districts, which became the geographical areas of rural district councils. Civil geographical parishes continued to exist in urban districts, but did not have parish councils.

Whilst the bulk of the rationalised activities went to district councils, parish councils took over a number of lesser powers including all the secular activities of the parish Vestry committee; a system of local government based on ecclesiastical parishes that originated in the feudal system.

== Modern development ==
Two principal acts of Parliament have increased the general powers of parish councils, and removed onerous constraints.

=== Local Government Act 1972 ===
The Redcliffe-Maud Report led to the Local Government Act 1972, which dramatically re-organised local government with amalgamation of district councils, large-scale changes to county boundaries and creation of metropolitan areas. However, the parish council was retained as the "grass roots" tier of local democracy for rural areas. In addition, many small towns which had previously formed municipal boroughs or urban districts became "successor parishes" within larger districts. The act also recognised the role of parish councils in development planning in their parish, and gave them the right to be informed and consulted on applications for such development. However, the original proposal to grant a general power of competence to councils was not carried through, and the doctrine of ultra vires remained. This meant that parish councils could not do anything outside their statutory powers.

=== Localism Act 2011 ===
It was not until the Localism Act 2011 that parish councils were freed of the constraints of ultra vires which had limited the activities of parish councils to only those things for which they had been given statutory powers. They were given a radical new power: to "do anything that individuals generally may do" as long as that is not limited by some other act. This is known as the General Power of Competence (GPC), and is available to "eligible" parish councils. An eligible council is one which has resolved to adopt the GPC, with at least two-thirds of its members being declared elected, rather than co-opted, and the clerk must hold an appropriate qualification. However the precept may not be raised specifically for activities which rely only on the power of the GPC, and such funding must be obtained from other sources.

The Localism Act 2011 also introduced new rights and powers to allow local communities to shape new development by coming together to prepare neighbourhood plans. Neighbourhood planning can be taken forward by two types of body: town and parish councils or "neighbourhood forums". Neighbourhood forums are community groups that are designated to take forward neighbourhood planning in areas without parishes. It is the role of the local planning authority to agree who should be the neighbourhood forum for the neighbourhood area.

Neighbourhood forums and parish councils can use new neighbourhood planning powers to establish general planning policies for the development and use of land in a neighbourhood. These are described legally as "neighbourhood development plans". In an important change to the planning system, communities can use neighbourhood planning to permit the development they want to see – in full or in outline – without the need for planning applications. These are called "neighbourhood development orders".

== Alternative styles ==
In 1974, the local government reforms allowed the creation of successor parish councils, to cover those areas formerly the responsibility of a municipal corporation. Such an area could be declared a "town", and the council would then be known as a "town council". The majority of successor parishes, and a number of other small market towns now have town councils, with the power of parish councils but their chairmen are entitled to style themselves as "town mayor". Similarly, a handful of parishes have been granted city status by letters patent: the council of such a parish is known as "city council" and the chairman is entitled to be known as the "city mayor".

In England, there are currently eight parishes with city status, all places with long-established Anglican cathedrals: Chichester, Ely, Hereford, Lichfield, Ripon, Salisbury, Truro and Wells. Despite its name, the City of Durham Parish Council is not a city; Durham's city status is held by charter trustees.

Following the enactment of the Local Government and Public Involvement in Health Act 2007, a parish council has been able to alternatively style itself as a "village council", "neighbourhood council" or "community council". A provision of this Act is that is that civil parishes may now be established in the London boroughs.

== Creation, alteration and abolition of councils ==
Since the enactment of the Local Government and Rating Act 1997, district and unitary councils may create a parish council for a new civil parish either through a review or in response to a petition. This has led to the creation of new parish councils at an increased rate, especially in large towns and cities which do not have a history of parish governance.

Since 13 February 2008 the power to create new parishes and parish councils, to alter parish boundaries, to dissolve parish councils and to abolish parishes has been devolved to district, unitary and London borough councils (collectively known as "principal councils"). This process is known as a "community governance review".

Principal councils have the power to make a community governance review at any time for all or part of their district. It is envisaged that such reviews will occur at intervals of between 10 and 15 years, and will take into account population changes, the need for well-defined boundaries and the wishes of local inhabitants. Reviews may also be triggered by a petition of local government electors for an area. A petition is deemed valid where it is signed by a sufficient proportion of the electorate (ranging from 50% in an area with fewer than 500 electors to 10% in one with more than 2,500). The sufficient proportion of the electorate necessary in areas with more than 2,500 electors was reduced from 10% to 7.5% under an amendment to the act made in 2015. At the end of the review process, which must be completed within 12 months, the principal council is empowered to issue a reorganisation order setting out the changes. This order may:

- Create a new parish
  - From all or part of an unparished area
  - By the division of an existing parish or parishes
  - By the merger of all or parts of existing parishes
- Alter the boundaries of existing parishes
- Group or ungroup parishes
- Give a name to a new parish
- Abolish an existing parish and dissolve its parish council

In order to abolish an existing parish council, the principal council must provide evidence that this in response to "justified, clear and sustained local support" from the area's inhabitants. Where a new parish is formed with 1,000 electors or more, a parish council must be formed. Where there are between 151 and 999 electors the principal council may recommend the establishment of either a parish council or parish meeting. Where there are 150 electors or fewer a parish council may not be formed.

Reviews come into effect on 1 April in the year following the date the reorganisation order is made. Where a new parish council is created, elections to the new body will be held at the time of next council elections. In the intervening period the principal council appoint the parish council from among their own membership.

== See also ==
- List of civil parishes in England
- Civil parishes in Scotland
- Charles Arnold-Baker noted writer on local council law and procedure.
