= Companion to British History =

1996 reference work by Charles Arnold-Baker

The Companion to British History is a single-volume encyclopaedic reference work written by Charles Arnold-Baker and edited by his son Henry von Blumenthal. It was published by Longcross Press in 1996, and described by The Spectator as "arguably one of the most remarkable books ever written". The Second Edition was published by Routledge. The Daily Telegraph, in an account of how the book came to be written, described it as being "bigger than a foundation stone, longer than the Bible".
