= Der Stricker =

13th-century Middle High German poet

Illustration from Der Stricker's Karl

Der Stricker is the pseudonym of a 13th-century Middle High German itinerant poet whose real name has been lost to history. His name, which means "The Knitter," may indicate he was a commoner; he was likely from Franconia but later worked in Austria. His works evince a knowledge of German literature and practical theology, and include both adaptations and works with no known sources.

Der Stricker's oeuvre includes the Arthurian romance Daniel von dem blühenden Tal and the epic Karl, a German adaptation of the Song of Roland, based directly on Konrad der Pfaffe's earlier German version but updated for his time. However, he was chiefly a writer of didactic poetry and exempla or bispel, and was one of the early pioneers of the genre. These poems dealt not only with the religious and moral matters typical of the form, but also with the praise of women and courtly love. Many of them focus on episodes from everyday life and make heavy use of burlesque humor. The best known of these tales is Pfaffe Âmis (Priest Amis), which involves the English clerk Âmis in the trickster role. These works show an emphasis on theological concerns, and were popular with priests, who used them to animate their sermons.

Der Stricker was well known to later poets, being mentioned and commended by Rudolf von Ems in his Alexander and his Willehalm von Orlens. Der Pleier wrote his Arthurian romance Garel as a reaction to Der Stricker's Daniel, the protagonist of which Der Pleier found to be too brutal and cunning for a hero. Where Der Stricker's hero exemplifies the warrior ethos of epic poetry, Der Pleier's Garel is specifically written as an embodiment of the courtly ideal.

== Sources ==
- Lacy, Norris J. (Ed.) (1991). The New Arthurian Encyclopedia. New York: Garland. ISBN 0-8240-4377-4.
