= Bülow =

Bülow or Bulow is a surname. Notable people with the surname include:

- Bülow family, a noble family from Germany with the surname "von Bülow"
- Bülow (singer) (Megan Bülow, born 1999), German-Canadian singer
- Alexander Bülow (1905–?), SS guard at Auschwitz concentration camp
- Anders Bülow (born 1994), Danish cricketer
- Anna Bülow (died 1519), Swedish writer, translator and abbess
- David Bulow (1980–2021), American soccer player and coach
- Friedrich Wilhelm Freiherr von Bülow (1755–1816), Prussian general
- Kai Bülow (born 1986), German footballer
- Karen Bulow (1899–1982), Danish-Canadian artist
- Marco Bülow (1971–2026), German politician and journalist
- Melissa Bulow (born 1980), Australian cricketer
- William J. Bulow (1869–1960), United States Senator, Governor of South Dakota

== Von Bülow ==
- Andreas von Bülow (born 1937), German politician, former government minister and author of a 9/11 conspiracy book
- Babette von Bülow (1850–1927), German author of short stories, comedies and farces under the male pen name Hans Arnold
- Bernhard Ernst von Bülow (1815–1879), Danish and German statesman, father of the Bernhard von Bülow (below)
- Bernhard von Bülow, Prince (1849–1929), Chancellor of the German Empire from 1900 to 1909
- Bertha von Marenholtz-Bülow (1810–1893), German educator
- Christian von Bülow (1917–2002), Danish sailor and Olympic champion
- Christoph Carl von Bülow (1716–1788), Prussian general under Frederick the Great
- Claus (von Bülow*) (1926–2019), Anglo-Danish lawyer and socialite. (Born Claus Borberg, he adopted his mother's family name.)
- Cosima (von Bülow*) Pavoncelli (born 1967), American socialite and philanthropist, daughter of Claus (von Bülow*) and Sunny (von Bülow*)
- Cosima Wagner daughter of Franz Liszt. Wife of Hans von Bülow, she left von Bülow for composer Richard Wagner.
- Dietrich Heinrich von Bülow (1757–1807), a.k.a. Heinrich Dietrich Bülow, Prussian officer during the Napoleonic Wars, military theorist, and brother of Friedrich Wilhelm von Bülow
- Franz Joseph von Bülow (1861–1915), German writer and homosexual activist
- Frederik Rudbek Henrik von Bülow (1791–1858), Danish general leading the defence of Fredericia during the 1849 Battle of Fredericia
- Frieda von Bülow (1857–1909), German traveller and writer
- Friedrich Gustav von Bülow (1814–1893), founder of Bothkamp Observatory
- Friedrich Wilhelm Freiherr von Bülow (1755–1816), Prussian general during the Napoleonic Wars
- Frits Toxwerdt von Bülow (1872–1955), Danish politician and government minister.
- Hans, Count von Bülow (1774–1825), Westphalian and Prussian statesman and senior president of Silesia
- Hans von Bülow (1830–1894), pianist, conductor and composer who married Liszt's daughter Cosima, who later left him for Richard Wagner
- Hans von Bülow (general) (1816–1897), Prussian general who fought during Austro-Prussian War, and Franco-Prussian War.
- Harry von Bülow-Bothkamp (1897–1976), German fighter ace in two World wars, brother of Walter von Bülow-Bothkamp
- Heinrich von Bülow (diplomat) (1792–1846), Prussian ambassador to England from 1827 to 1840, uncle of Bernhard
- Heinrich von Bülow (Grotekop) (died before 1395/1415?), German knight and robber baron
- Hugo von Bülow (1821–1869), Prussian diplomat
- Johan Hartvig Victor Carl von Bülow, Rittmester (1754–1823), Norwegian-Swedish vice general during the Swedish-Danish war of Norway
- Johann Albrecht von Bülow (1708–1776), Prussian general under Frederick the Great
- Karl von Bülow (1846–1921), German World War I field marshal
- Margarethe von Bülow (1860–1884), German novelist
- Otto von Bülow (1911–2006), German World War II U-boat commander
- Otto von Bülow (diplomat) (1827–1901), Prussian and German diplomat.
- Sunny von Bülow (1932–2008), wife of Claus von Bülow, who was accused of poisoning her
- Vicco von Bülow a.k.a. Loriot (1923–2011), German humorist and graphic artist
- Walter von Bülow-Bothkamp (1894–1918), German fighter ace, brother of Harry von Bülow-Bothkamp

== See also ==
- Aadel Bülow-Hansen (1906–2001), Norwegian physiotherapist
- Vivianna Torun Bülow-Hübe (1927–2004), Swedish silversmith
