= Saldern =

German aristocratic family

Coat of arms of Saldern family

The Saldern family (up to the 17th century, Salder) or von Saldern, is the name of an old German aristocratic family from the areas of Hildesheim and Brunswick Land. The family seat of the same name is an eponymous castle on the River Fuhse in Salzgitter-Salder. Originally the family, whose branches are still alive today, only owned estates in the Lower Saxony area, but from the middle of the 16th century they also owned extensive property in the March of Brandenburg.

== Family history ==
According to legend the founder of the line (Stammherr), Sieghard de Rosis, came to Germany from Rome in 718 with St. Boniface. In 1102, the family is mentioned for the first time in the chronicle Chronicon coenobii Sancti Michaelis, in Hildesheim. According to this document, the knightly family of von Saldern was enfeoffed that year with tithe rights (mit den Zehnten) by St. Michael's Abbey near Nettlingen (Söhlde).

According to historical records the first member of the family to be classed amongst the nobiles layci ('lay nobility') was Thidericius de Saldere in 1161. The titled aristocratic line begins in 1226 with the knight, Burchard von Salder. From 1299 to 1332, a Johann von Salder is also recorded.

=== Lichtenberg Castle ===
In 1267, the Duke of Brunswick and Lüneburg, Otto the Child, bequeathed the Lüneburg estates to his son, John. These included Lichtenberg Castle in present-day Salzgitter, thus John became the lord of the castle (Burgherr).

In 1273 records show that court jurisdiction ["circa castrum Lichtenberg"] was exercised in the castle. In 1299, Aschwin von Salder was named as the judge and bailiff (Richter and Amtmann) here. It is possible that the lords of Saldern had already been given advocacy rights (Vogteirechte) by this time.

According to the book of fees (Fehdebuch) for the town of Brunswick, the lords of Saldern carried out raids in the surrounding area between 1379 and 1382. In 1379 Aschwin attacked a baggage train of goods wagons with 17 tonnes of herrings. The booty was carried off to Lichtenberg castle with the enforced assistance of the escort. As well as Aschwin, other robber barons occupied the castle, such as Jan and Borchhard von Saldern, Sieverd von Broistede and Kord von dem Steinberge. In 1388, after Lichtenberg Castle had returned to the possession of the Brunswick dukes, the lords of Saldern were once again given the castle as a fief. Between 1390 and 1396 Duke Frederick renewed the enfeoffment of castle and court to the lords of Saldern. In the 15th century, however, they were apparently driven from the castle, because other families are named as the castle advocates (Burgvögte).

=== Entailed estates ===
Former fortified entailed estates (Fideikommiss) of the family:

- Wilsnack (owned by the family since 1560), consisting of Wilsnack, Övelgünde and Jackel, (Westprignitz) and Werder/Altmark

In the Church of the Precious Blood (Wunderblutkirche) in Bad Wilsnack there is a number of artefacts that bear witness to the family. The pulpit of the church was sponsored by Jakob Friedrich von Saldern (born 18 April 1658, died 24 December 1698) after the death of his wife, Ottilie Elisabeth von Bismarck (1659–1695). The pulpit is decorated with the coats of arms of the von Saldern and Bismarck families. To the right and left of the organ are two epitaphs. The right-hand one is in memory of Matthias Friedrich von Saldern (born 22 April 1650; died 3 June 1680). The oval portrait, painted in oil on wood, has cherubs on both sides. Underneath is a relief with a portrayal of von Saldern bearing arms. The epitaph to the left of the organ commemorates the Prussian court baron and Court of Appeal advisor (Hof- und Kammergerichtsrat), Friedrich August von Saldern (born 28 June 1694; died 20 February 1729), and his wife, Elisabeth Charlotte von Saldern (born 17 December 1688; died 5 April 1732), (daughter of Siegfried Christoph von Saldern of Plattenburg; widow of von Krosigk) as well as other members of the family.

- Klein-Leppin (Westprignitz)
- The Plattenburg, bought by Matthias von Saldern (1508–1575), a fief since 1552, hereditary possession of the family from 1560 to 1945 with Plattenburg and Zernikow (Westprignitz)

=== Other estates ===
Around 1400 Aschwin von Saldern is named as the vassal (Pfandinhaber) of Wohldenberg Castle near Holle.

On 22 May 1406 troops under the Hildesheim bishop, John III of Hoya, Henry of Bortfeld and Burghard of Cramm, destroyed the walls of Gebhardshagen castle (today Salzgitter-Gebhardshagen) and captured it. The ducal vassals, Jan and Burchhard von Saldern, were ordered to rebuild the armoury, the Red and the Grey Towers.

In the 14th century, the family held fiefs in Nettlingen (today a village in the municipality of Söhlde in Hildesheim district) belonging to the Principality of Brunswick-Wolfenbüttel and Principality of Hildesheim. Around 1325, the counts of Wohldenberg enfeoffed the knights with the jurisdiction (Gerichtsbarkeit) of the village and the logging rights (Holzgrafschaft) on the Vorholz, a low, heavily forested ridge near Hildesheim.

In 1509 Heinrich von Saldern, father of the von Saldern brothers, signed a treaty with the Hildesheim bishop, John IV of Saxe-Lauenburg which pledged that the enfeoffment of Lauenstein and the Amt of Lauenstein (Salzhemmendorf) to the von Salderns, that had been in force since 1497, would not be revoked during the lifetime of Heinrich von Saldern. After his death, the fief would transfer exclusively to the episcopal administration.

Hans von Saldern, vassal of the fortified house at Lutter am Barenberge had to vacate it against his will. Following his departure, the bishop provisioned his castles at Steuerwald and Peine with food and munitions as a precaution.

In 1515, Burchard von Saldern took over the castle and Amt of Lauenstein from his father. That same year, however, Bishop John, dismissed the three sons of Heinrich von Saldern from the castle and Amt of Lauenstein. The brothers refused the order in view of the aforementioned treaty. They also demanded 3,000 guilders from the bishop to pay for their investment in fortifications, a demand which the bishop in turn refused to pay. Various negotiations followed that finally led, on 15 March 1518, to an arbitral decision by the estates (Landstände) that Bishop John should pay the von Salderns for the cost of constructing the fortifications, but that the von Salderns had to leave the castle and Amt of Lauenstein by Easter. However, because Burchard refused to accept the repayment of the pledge sum (Pfandschilling), he was driven from the Lauenstein Castle that year and was replaced by Statius von Münchhausen as the Hildesheim advocate (Vogt) at Lauenstein. After an unsuccessful attack on the castle, Burchard von Saldern, burned the castle hamlet (Burgflecken) of Lauenstein to the ground. In summer he nailed a letter to the castle gate with the words: "Borchert von Salder do bekand; dat ick hebbe jedan dußen Brand; dat bekenne ick mit meiner Hand." ('Burchard von Saldern makes known that I lit this fire; I confess this with my own hand').

Several fights ensued, the conflict eventually escalating into a statewide issue. On 5 July 1518 Burchard razed Schellerten. He also had Gronau set on fire by a hired servant and almost completely destroyed.

In January 1519 the Hildesheim Diocesan Feud began. Following that, in 1523, Henneckenrode castle belonged to Brunswick. Henry of Saldern had the castle remodelled in 1579/80. In 1687, Adam Arnold von Bocholtz bought the Henneckenrode estate.

In 1597, his son Burchard von Saldern (born 1568, died 29 December 1635), built the chapel in the castle courtyard. In 1613, before the onset of the Thirty Years' War, he had the Wilsnack hour bells cast for the Church of the Precious Blood in Bad Wilsnack, whose patron he was. His wives were Anna von Klitzing and Agnes von der Schulenburg.

In 1552, the Brandenburg prince-elector, Joachim II had the water castle of Plattenburg in the Prignitz transferred to his Keeper of the Privy Purse (Oberstkämmerer), Matthias von Saldern, as a bequest and fief. The castle and its associated estates remained in the ownership of the family until 1945, when they were dispossessed.

Around 1570, Kurt von Saldern built Nettlingen castle and sold it around 1611 to the Brewers' Guild in Hildesheim.

Because of debts totalling 21,000 talers, Jacob and Heinrich von Saldern enfeoffed their family seat to Statius von Münchhausen. In the 18th century, Caspar von Saldern was a civil servant and minister of state to Catharine II of Russia. At the time of King Frederick the Great, the lord of Saldern-Plattenburg was at odds with his cousin, the lord of Saldern-Wilsnack. The royal Prussian governor (Landrat), Gustav von Saldern-Plattenburg and his wife Thusnelda, née Countess von Seherr-Thoß, had five children. The two eldest were Thusnelda and her twin sister, Agnes, who died at 14. Thusnelda inherited Meffersdorf Castle in Silesia, to which the family moved.

From 1800 to 1850 the castle at Groß Plasten was owned by Lieutenant von Saldern.

In 1945 Sieghard von Saldern and his family fled before the Red Army to West Germany. Their estate at Plattenburg was divided up in the wake of the post-1945 land reform in the Soviet Occupation Zone. After 1990 his eldest son, Dietrich von Saldern, returned and founded a society with the aim of preserving the Plattenburg. The building was at that time the property of the municipality. Karoline Albrecht, née Senfft von Pilsach, is the granddaughter of the last private owner and together with her husband they currently rent the castle.

== Coat of arms ==
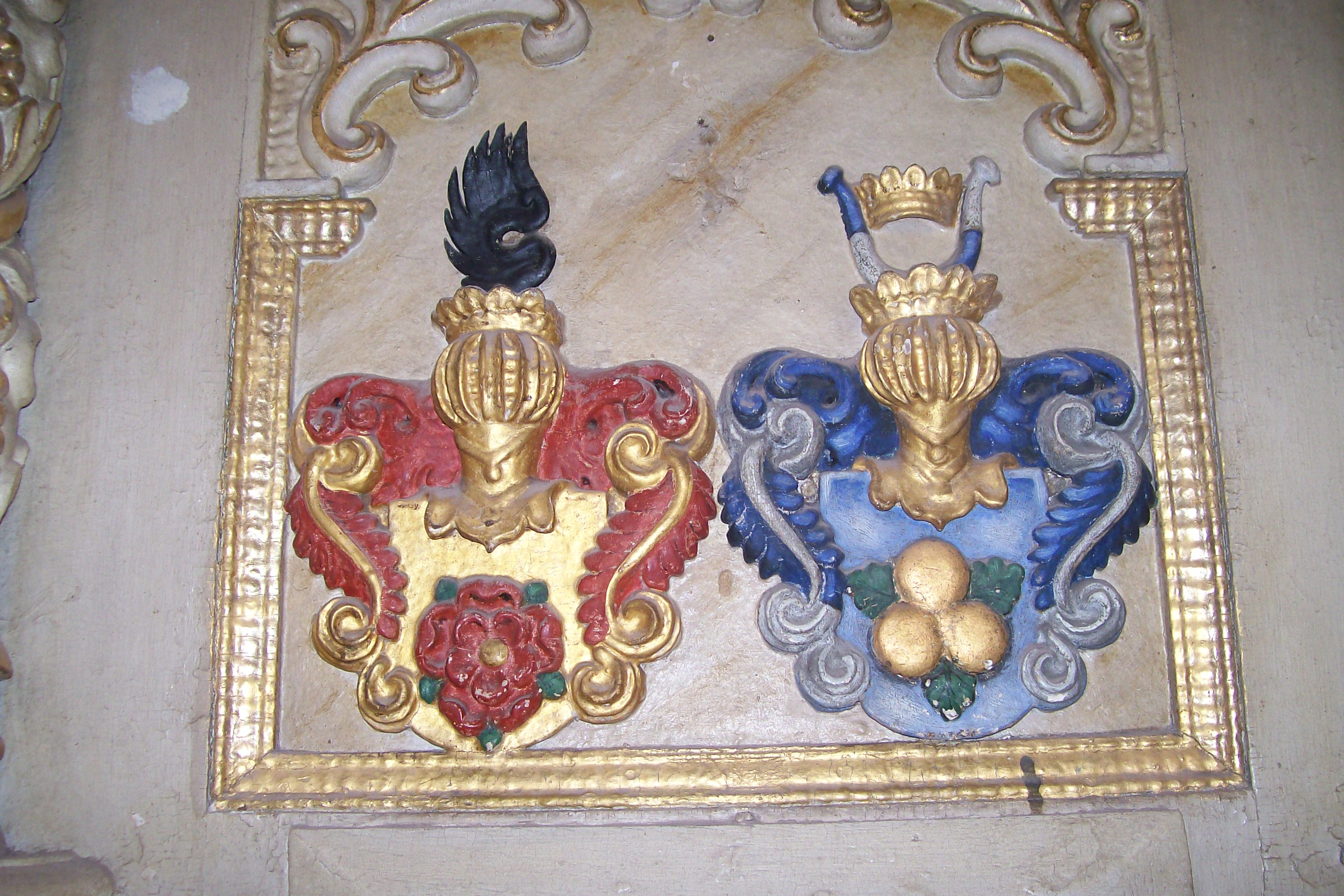
Coat of arms of the von Saldern family (left) and Bismarck on the pulpit of the Church of the Precious Blood in Bad Wilsnack

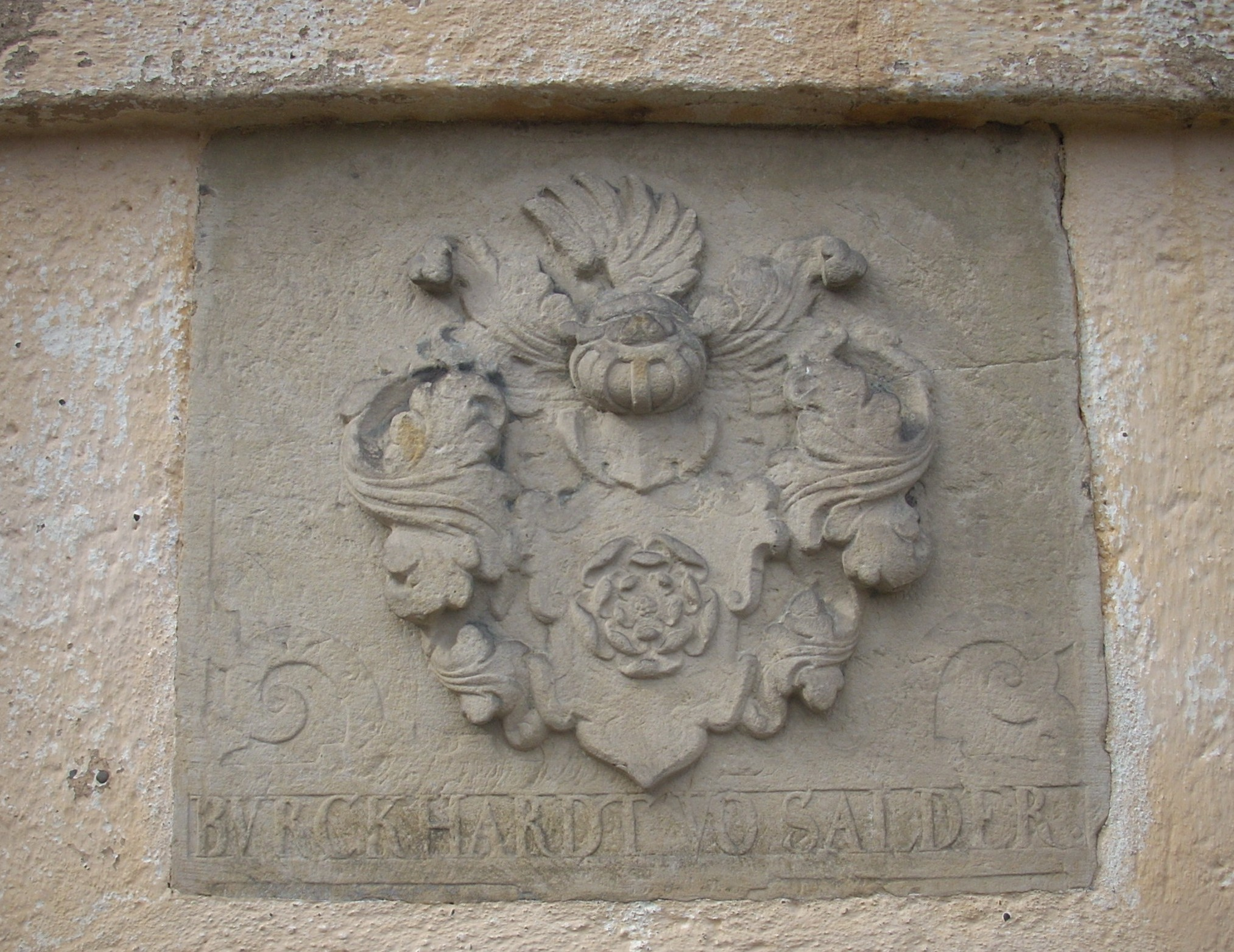
Coat of arms of Burckhardt von Saldern on St. Mark's Church, Equord

The family coat of arms is a red rose on a gold field. On the helmet with its red and gold mantling is an open black wing.

== People ==
- Friedrich von Saldern (von Sallern; 1685–1722), German administrative official of the Duke of Holstein
- Caspar von Saldern (1711–1786), Russian and Danish minister and Privy Councillor (Geheimrat)
- Friedrich Christoph von Saldern (1719–1785), Prussian general
- Carl Hinrich von Saldern-Günderoth (1739–1788), German landowner and Danish Privy Councillor (Geheimrat)
- Count Hugo von Saldern-Ahlimb-Ringenwalde (1829–1893), majorat holder (Majoratsbesitzer) and member of the German Reichstag
- Siegfried von Saldern (1843–1913), Reichstag MP
- Werner von Saldern (1852–1930), Prussian politician (DKP) and MdR (1903–1912) and governor (Landrat) of Königsberg Neumark
- Elisabeth von Saldern (1878–1938), governess to Princess Victoria Louise of Prussia and abbess of the Evangelical convent of Heiligengrabe Abbey
- Burghardt von Saldern-Wilsnack (1916-2002), Major in the Wehrmacht, Colonel of the Bundeswehr Holder of the Knight's Cross of the Iron Cross awarded on 4 May 1944, German Cross in Gold awarded on 23 June 1943, Honour Roll Clasp awarded on 7 September 1943.
- Adelheid von Saldern (born 1938), German historian

== School foundation ==
In 1589 the widow of Matthias von Salderns, Gertrud von Saldern née von Hake (1518–1595), donated the former bishop's estate of St. Gotthardt's Church in Brandenburg an der Havel to the old town of Brandenburg at the instigation of the humanist, headmaster and town lawyer, Zacharias Garcaeus, whom she had befriended. The background to this donation was that the Old Grammar School (Alte Lateinschule) west of the church was not able to cope with the rising number of students. On the alienation of this property the Salder School was founded, named after her, and was housed in the former bishop's seat.

== See also ==
- Schierensee
- Harbke
- Salzgitter
- Salder Castle
- Hehlen

== Literature ==
- Otto Grotefend: Urkunden der Familie von Saldern, 1932-1938 (Veröffentlichungen der Historischen Kommission für Hannover, Oldenburg, Braunschweig, Schaumburg-Lippe und Bremen). Vol 1: 1102–1366, Vol. 2: 1366-1500
- Prignitzer Volksbücher, Doppelheft 64/65, 1926 (beschreibt die Plattenburg und die Familie von Saldern)
- Genealogisches Handbuch des Adels, Adelslexikon Band XII, pages 193–194, Vol. 125 der Gesamtreihe, C. A. Starke Verlag, Limburg (Lahn) 2001, ISSN 0435-2408
