= Plattenburg (castle) =

- Plattenburg
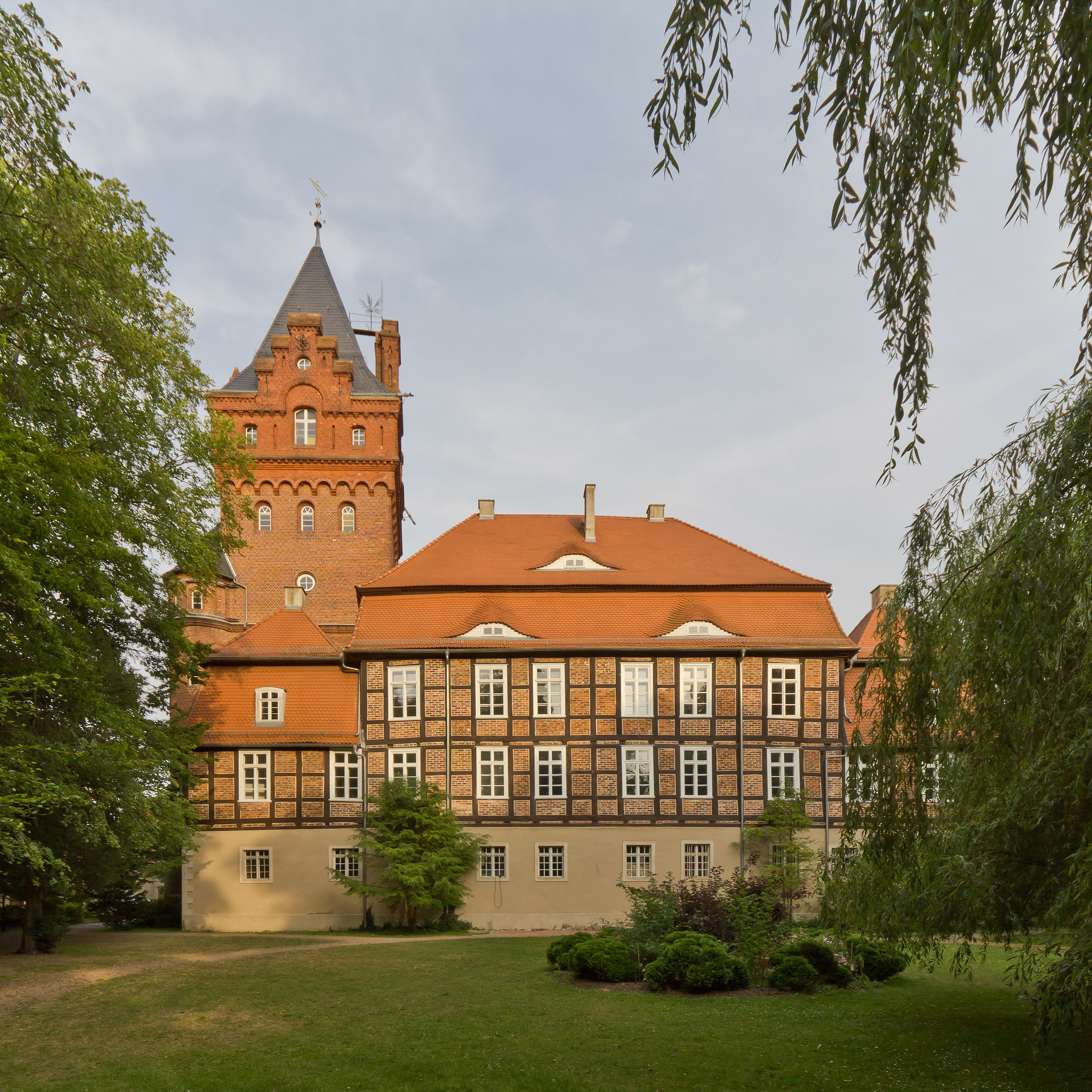
- The Plattenburg

Site information
- Type: lowland castle
- Code: DE-BB
- Condition: preserved or largely preserved

Location
- Coordinates: 52°57′29.52″N 12°1′51.96″E

Site history
- Built: first recorded in 1319
- Materials: Brick, timber-framed

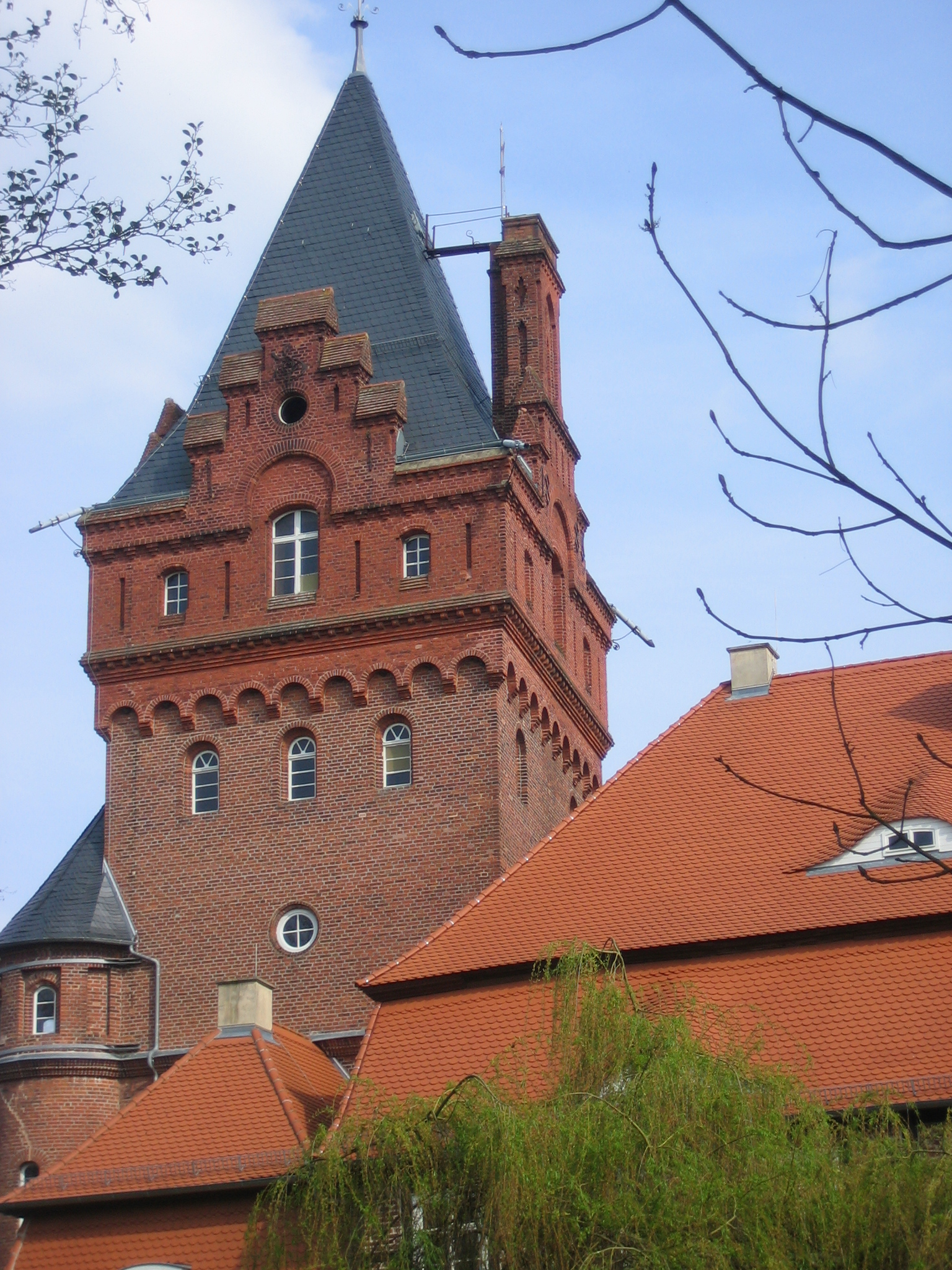
Tower on Plattenburg castle

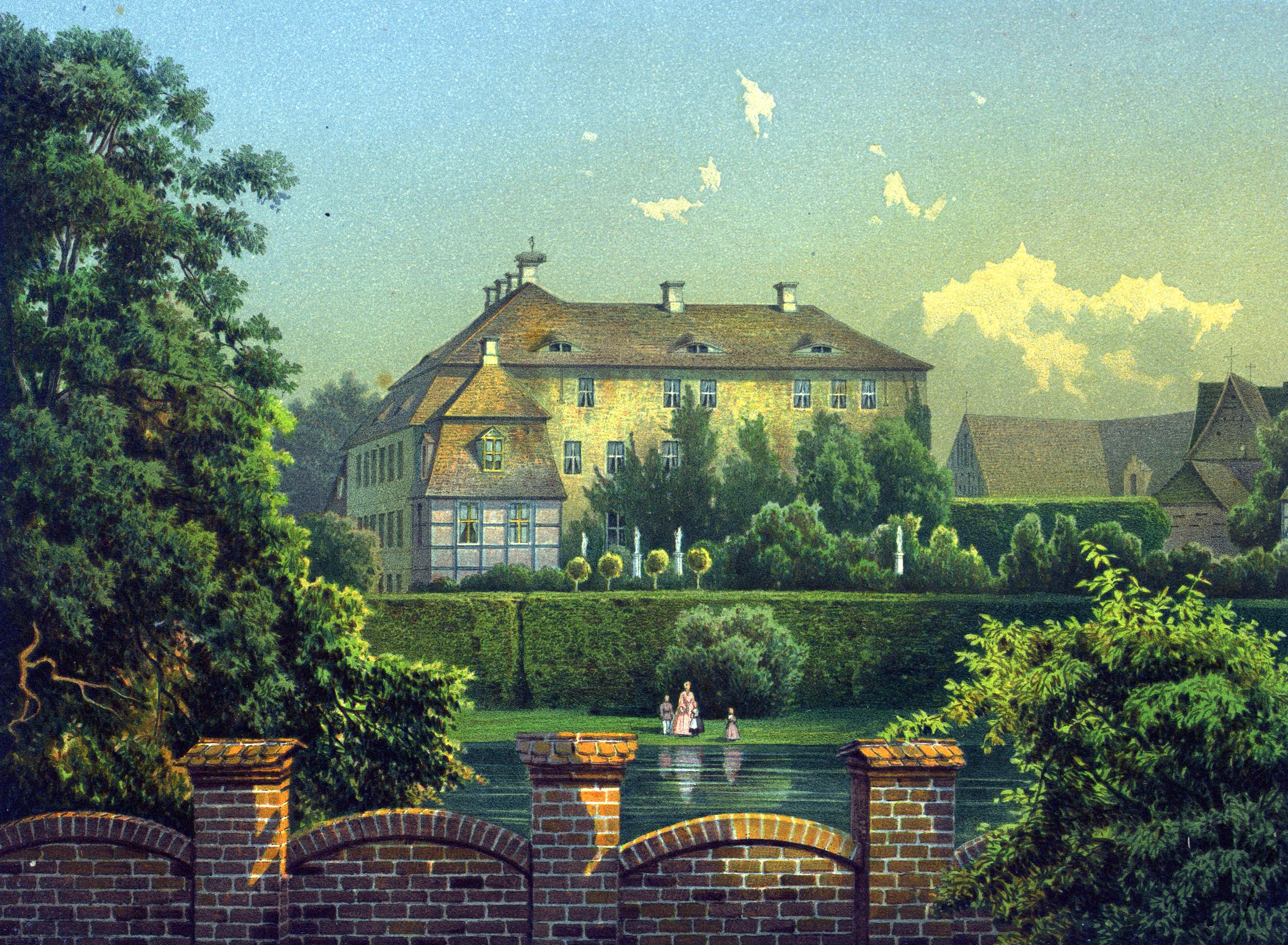
Plattenburg around 1860, Alexander Duncker collection

The Plattenburg is a water castle in the independent municipality of Plattenburg in the German district of Prignitz in northwestern Brandenburg. It was first documented in 1319, making it the oldest surviving water castle in northern Germany.

== Location ==
The lowland castle is located in Prignitz. Due to its picturesque location in a region of forests and lakeland, the castle was the summer residence of the bishops of Havelberg in the Middle Ages.

== History ==
The castle was first mentioned in 1319, Bishop Reiner of Havelberg having purchased it from Margrave Waldemar of Brandenburg.

In 1548 Plattenburg became the seventh Prignitz district. After the death of Busso II, the last bishop of Havelberg, the Elector of Brandenburg, Joachim II, who had recently converted to the Lutheran Church, had his son Frederick IV elected as Bishop of Havelberg in 1551.

In 1552, the preacher Joachim Ellefeld burned the Wilsnack's holy blood hosts and was incarcerated at the Plattenburg. Elector Joachim II pledged the castle to his chamberlain, Matthias of Saldern. In 1560 he was given the castle and estate (including Wilsnack) as a heritable and personal enfeoffment.

Around 1600 an expansion of the upper castle was carried out in the Late Renaissance style under Burchard von Saldern. In 1631, during the Thirty Years' War, the King of Sweden Gustavus Adolphus issued a writ of protection (Schutzbrief) for the lords of Plattenburg. Some time later Burchard von Saldern built a new castle chapel in the bakehouse and brewery. In 1675, Swedish troops laid siege to the castle.

In 1724 the construction of timber-framed wing was carried out. The architect was Johann Jakob Müller from Brunswick. In 1883 the brick tower burned down at temperatures of minus 15 °C, but was rebuilt even higher by Siegfried von Saldern.

Between 1925 and 1945 Sieghard von Saldern took over lordship of Plattenburg. In 1940 French prisoners of war were billeted in the chapel wing, part of the castle serving as a military hospital.

After the estate was expropriated by the state from the von Salderns in 1945, refugee families lived in the castle until 1960. In 1969, the keep was converted into a holiday home for the East German Deutsche Reichsbahn, and it was used as such until 1991. That same year, an association was founded to promote and preserve the Plattenburg and restoration began which has continued to the present (2008). In 1995, a memorial stone was erected in front of the varlets' house by the Federation of Expellees to the victims of forced displacement after the Second World War.

== Present use ==
Today the Plattenburg is home to museum rooms, the wedding room of the municipality of Plattenburg and has overnight accommodation for around 30 people.

The Plattenburg is the last station on the Pilgrim Way from Berlin to Wilsnack to the Church of the Holy Sacrament in Bad Wilsnack.

=== Events ===
- Aquamaria Festival
- Medieval castle spectacular
- Rock night at the Plattenburg
- Plattenburg Round Table in the restaurant in the castle cellars (medieval banquet)

== Site ==
Architectural features include examples of remarkable craftsmanship and artistic artefacts of the Late Renaissance period (door, sandstone staircase, fireplace) in the Great Hall (Rittersaal) and the halls in the Bishop's Wing.

== Literature ==
- Torsten Foeelsch: Die Plattenburg. In: Schlösser und Gärten der Mark, Berlin 1993 (1st ed.)
- Torsten Foelsch: Adel, Schlösser und Herrenhäuser in der Prignitz. Beiträge zur Kultur- und Kunstgeschichte einer kurmärkischen Landschaft, Perleberg 1997
