= Dietrich Man =

Dietrich Man, known as Dietrich II, was Bishop of Havelberg from 1370 to 1385.

== Biography ==
The Man family, though not noble, were prominent in the Prignitz, which lay within the Diocese of Havelberg, and closely connected with the local nobility. Dietrich's grandfather Johann Man married, first, a widow of Ivan von Below, and the children by this marriage inherited von Below estates. The second wife, Dietrich's grandmother, was a sister of Ruthger III von Blumenthal, whose family remained close to the Man family. His father was Ruthger Man, mentioned in documents of 1313–18.

Man was appointed to the Bishopric of Havelberg in 1370. This was a lawless period in the history of the Prignitz, and the bishops had constant armed conflict with the local barons. One of these, Heinrich von Bülow, known as Big Head, burned down the diocesan village of Wilsnack. The parish priest found that, on the high altar of his ruined church, was a sacrarium containing three consecrated hosts, which not only had been unharmed by the fire, but now were spotted with blood. Bishop Dietrich came to consecrate the hosts so as to ensure that no unconsecrated host was accidentally being venerated idolatrously, but, so the story goes, the host overflowed with blood before he could say the words of consecration. Miracles were soon attributed to the Holy Blood of Wilsnack, which soon became one of the most important places of pilgrimage in Europe, exceeding even Santiago, Rome and Jerusalem for numbers of pilgrims.
