= Heinrich von Bülow =

Heinrich von Bülow may refer to:

- Heinrich von Bülow (diplomat) (1792–1846), foreign minister of Prussia
- Heinrich von Bülow (Grotekop) (died before 1395 or in 1415), German knight and robber baron
