= Salder House =

Coordinates: 52°8′8.902022″N 10°20′15.01″E

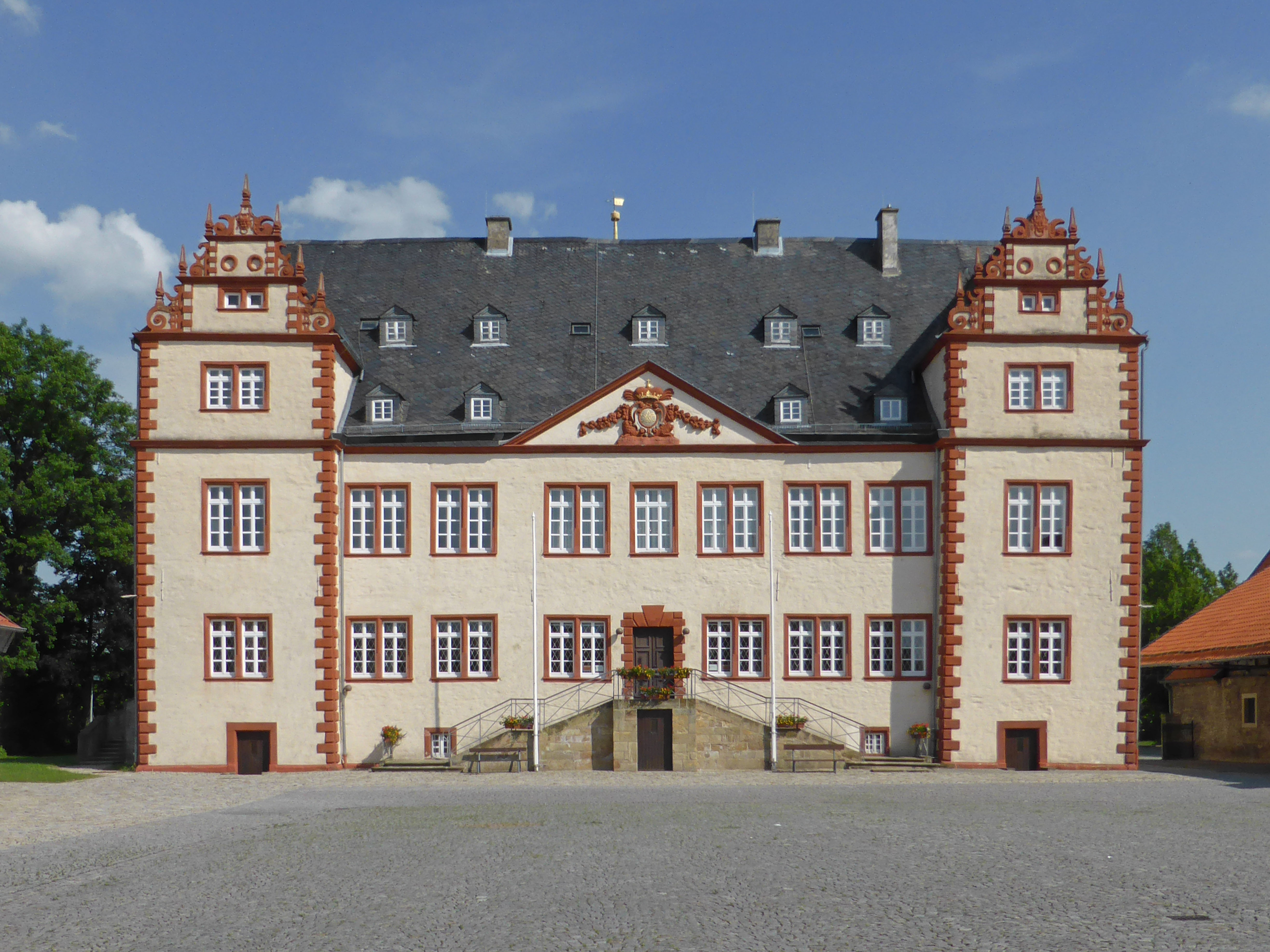
Salder House town museum

Salder House (German: Schloss Salder) is a stately home in the Renaissance style in Salder, a village in the borough of Salzgitter in Lower Saxony. It was built in 1608 for the lords of Saldern by master builder, Paul Francke, by order of Kriegsrat David Sachses of Wolfenbüttel.

In 1695, the heir to the throne, Augustus William of Brunswick-Wolfenbüttel bought the complex and had major restoration work carried out on it.

Since 1962 Salzgitter's town museum has been located in Salder House and may be visited free of charge. Its major exhibition themes are geology, prehistory and protohistory as well as the history of the town and 31 villages of Salzgitter borough from the Baroque period to the 20th century. In the division titled "From Ore to Steel" (Vom Erz zum Stahl) various models are displayed, including one of the Gebrüder Schreitel iron foundry.

A wide variety of open-air events are held in the courtyard during the summer months.
