= Bishopric of Havelberg =

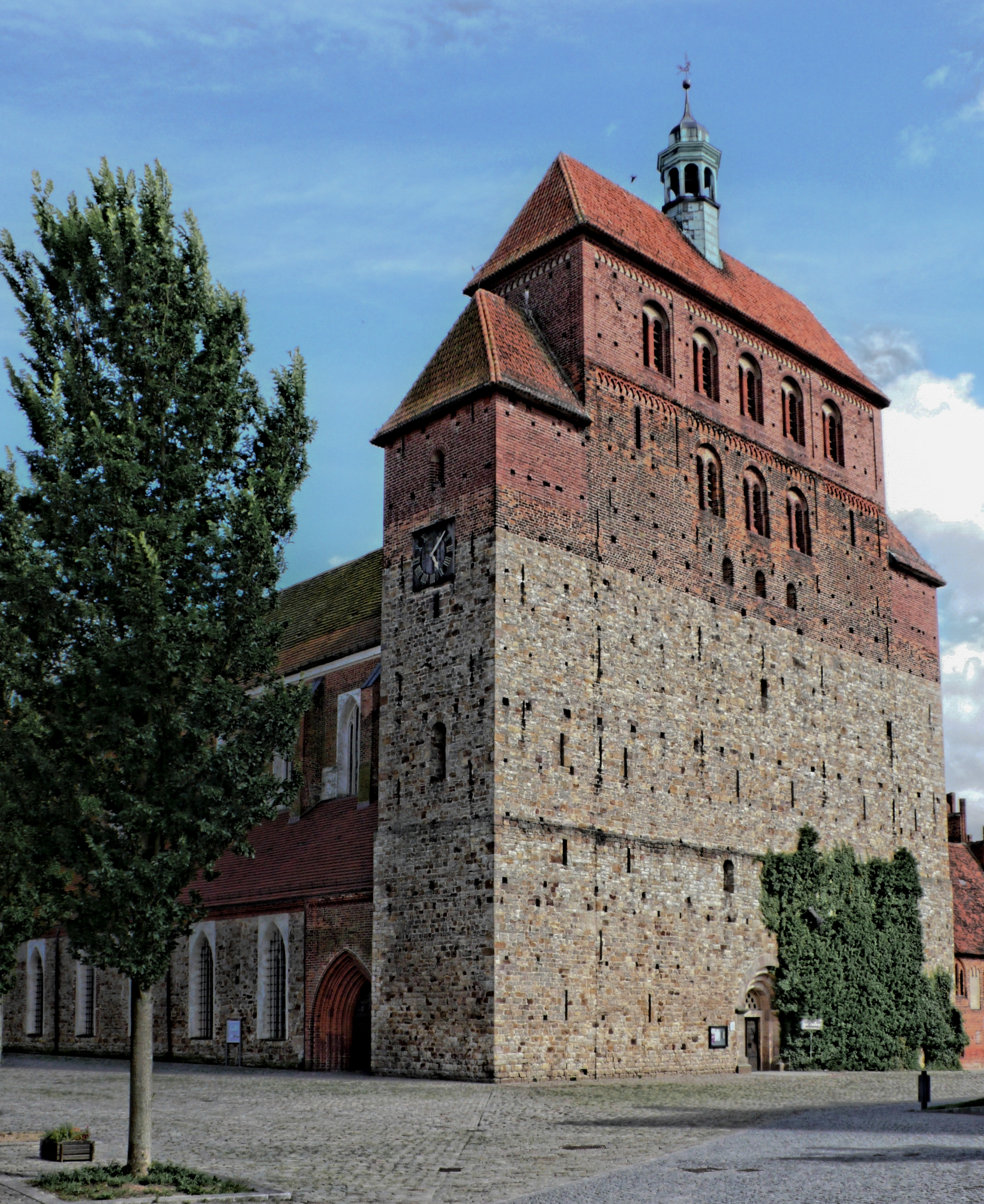
Westwork of Havelberg Cathedral

The Bishopric of Havelberg (German: Bistum Havelberg) was a Catholic diocese founded by King Otto I of Germany in 946, from 968 a suffragan to the Archbishops of Magedeburg. A Prince-bishopric (Hochstift) from 1151, Havelberg as a result of the Protestant Reformation was secularised and finally annexed by the margraves of Brandenburg in 1598.

== Geography ==
The episcopal seat was in Havelberg near the confluence of the Elbe and Havel rivers. The bishopric roughly covered the western Prignitz region, between the Altmark in the west and the Brandenburgian core territory in the east. While the episcopal territory was supervised by nine Archdeacons (Pröpste), the bishop's—considerably smaller—secular estates were subdivided into four Ämter:

- Wittstock
- Plattenburg with Wilsnack
- Schönhausen with Fischbeck
- Fehrbellin

== History ==
=== Early history ===
King Henry the Fowler in 929 marched against the Polabian Slavs settling east of the Elbe River and defeated them in a battle near Lenzen. Occupying the eastern riverbank, Henry had a fortification built on a hill above the Havel tributary, near its mouth into the Elbe. His son Otto I continued the expeditions and in 936/37 established the Saxon Eastern March (Marca Geronis) on the conquered territories. In 948 he founded the dioceses of Havelberg and Brandenburg, initially suffragans to the Archbishops of Mainz, from 968 to the newly established Archdiocese of Magdeburg. Part of the Northern March from 968, Havelberg diocese was occupied by revolting Lutici tribes in the Great Slav Rising of 983 and the bishops remained far from their see.

Not until 150 years later, King Lothair III of Germany re-occupied Havelberg in 1130; the eastern Elbe bank was finally reconquered by the Ascanian margrave Albert the Bear in 1136/37. In 1140 the northern part of the see was annexed to the newly formed Bishopric of Cammin.

=== Prince-bishopric ===
Bishopric of Havelberg Bistum Havelberg
- 1151–1598
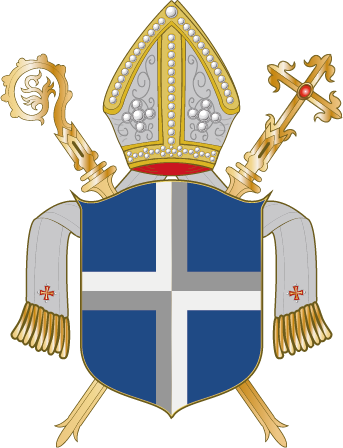
- Coat of arms

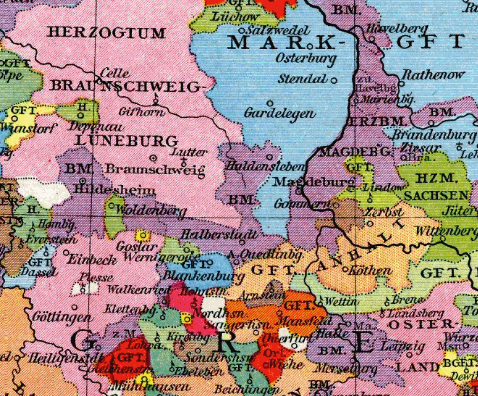
- Lower Saxon Prince-bishoprics of Hildesheim, Halberstadt, Magdeburg and Havelberg (violet), about 1250
- Status: Prince-Bishopric
- Capital: Havelberg; Wittstock (from about 1325)
- Common languages: Brandenburgisch, Polabian
- Historical era: Middle Ages
  - Diocese founded by King Otto I: 948
  - Prince-bishopric: 1151
  - Transformed into collegiate church: 1506
  - Secularised: 1571
  - Annexed by Brandenburg: 1598
Preceded by	Succeeded by
Northern March	Margraviate of Brandenburg

The first and most famous Prince-Bishop of Havelberg was the Premonstratensian canon Anselm of Havelberg, who had been anointed already in 1129 by the Magedeburg archbishop Norbert of Xanten. Anselm first took his seat at Jerichow in 1144. Upon the Wendish Crusade in 1147, he was able to found a cathedral chapter at Havelberg and to begin the building of St. Mary's Cathedral, which was consecrated in 1170.

Originally built as a Romanesque basilica, the Cathedral was severely damaged by fire in 1279 and then converted to the Gothic style. The complex eventually grew to include a priory, deanery, brewery, oast house, hospital, school, and residences for the canons.

The diocesan and secular territory were already separated in 1151. However, the bishops held no secular rights in the town of Havelberg itself, which was enfeoffed to the Brandenburg margraves. A charter issued by Emperor Frederick Barbarossa to declare the residence an episcopal city was never carried out, and in the following centuries, the Havelberg bishops gradually moved their residence to their Amt Wittstock about 50 kilometres (31 mi) to the northeast. In 1383 the Holy Blood of Wilsnack became a famous pilgrimage site, while Dietrich Man was bishop. In 1395, Bishop Johann III Wöplitz incorporated St. Nicholas' Church at Wilsnack into his episcopal household so that two-thirds of the income flowed directly to the bishopric. Luther and others criticized it as providing an incentive for church officials to encourage dubious shrines. From the 14th century onwards, the Havelberg bishops also used Plattenburg Castle as a summer residence.

After long-lasting quarrels with the mighty Brandenburg prince-electors, the Premonstratensian chapter finally gave in to transform Havelberg into a collegiate church (Stift). From 1514 onwards the deans of the cathedral were appointed by the Margraves of Brandenburg. In the course of the Protestant Reformation, the Bishopric of Havelberg turned Lutheran and from 1554 was administrated by Joachim Frederick of Hohenzollern, son of Elector John George of Brandenburg. The Bishopric was finally secularised and incorporated into Brandenburg in 1571. Its annexation was complete, when Joachim Frederick succeeded his father as Brandenburg elector in 1598.

== Bishops ==
Name	From	To
Udo	946	983
Sede vacante	983	991
Hilderich	991	1008
Erich	1008	1024 ?
Gottschalk	1024 ?	1085
Wichmann	1085	1089
Hezilo	before 1096	1110 ?
Bernhard	1110 ?	1118
Haimo	1118	1120
Gumbert	1120	1125
Anselm	1126	1155
Walo	1155	1176
Hugibert/Hubert	1176	1191
Helmbert	1191	1206
Sibodo of Stendal	1206	1219
Wilhelm	1219	1244
Heinrich I von der Schulenburg or perhaps von Kerkow	1244	1270
Heinrich II von Sternberg	1270	1290
Hermann of Brandenburg, son of Margrave John I	1290	1291
John I of Brandenburg, son of Margrave John II	1291	1292
John II	1292	1304
Arnold (possibly von Plötz)	1304	1312
Rainer von Dequede	1312	1319
Heinrich III	1319	1324
Dietrich I Kothe	1325	1341
Burkhard I von Bardeleben	1341	1348
Burkhard II, Count of Lindow-Ruppin	1348	1370
Dietrich Man	1370	1385
Johann III Wöplitz	1385	1401
Otto von Rohr	1401	1427
Friedrich I Krüger	1427	1427
Johann IV von Beust	1427	1427
Konrad von Lintorf	1427	1460
Witticho Gans zu Putlitz	1461	1487
Busso I of Alvensleben	1487	1493
Otto II von Königsmarck	1493	1501
Johann von Schlabrendorf	1501	1520
Georg von Blumenthal	1520	1521
Hieronymus Schulz, formerly Bishop of Brandenburg	1520	1522
Busso II of Alvensleben	1522	1548
Frederick II of Brandenburg (Lutheran), son of Elector Joachim II Hector	1548	1552
Sede vacante	1552	1554
Joachim Frederick of Brandenburg (Lutheran)	1554	1598

== Sources ==
- Jürgen Schrader: Der Flecken Calvörde – Eine 1200-jährige Geschichte. Göttingen: Verlag Die Werkstatt, 2011, p. 54.
