= Felix Eberty =

German lawyer, amateur astronomer, and writer (1812–1884)

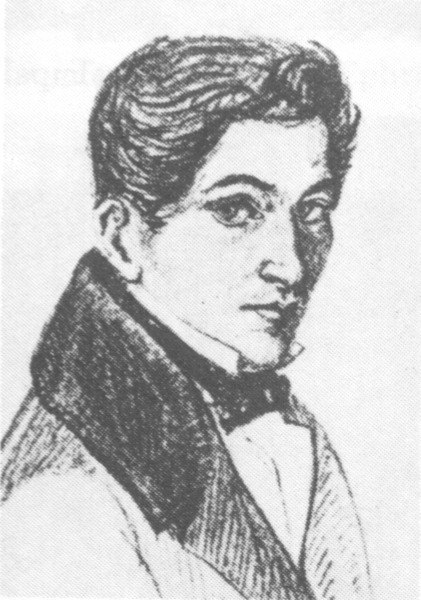
Felix Eberty self-portrait circa 1850

Georg Friedrich Felix Eberty (26 January 1812 – 7 July 1884) was a German lawyer, amateur astronomer, and writer.

== Biography ==
Eberty was the son of the banker Hermann Eberty (name changed from Heimann Joseph Ephraim to Hermann Eberty in 1810) and his wife Babette, née Mosson. Felix Eberty's grandfather was the banker Joseph Veitel Ephraim; his great-grandfather was the court factor Veitel Heine Ephraim. Eberty married the landowner's daughter, Marie Amalie Catharina, née Hasse (born 21 May 1822 in Barottwitz near Breslau; died in 1887 in Arnsdorf) and was the father of four daughters, including the eldest Maria Carlotta Margarethe Stobbe, and the third, the short story author Babette von Bülow (pseudonym Hans Arnold).

Eberty grew up in Berlin and studied at the Cauer Institution. He also received private lessons from mathematician Jakob Steiner. From 1831 to 1834, he studied law in Berlin and Bonn. He completed his legal internship in Berlin at the municipal court and at the chamber court under the president of the chamber court Wilhelm Heinrich von Grolman. In 1840, he became evaluator of the chamber court and then advisor to judges in Hirschberg, Lübben and Breslau. In 1849, after leaving the judicial service, he completed his habilitation, studied natural and criminal law and became an associate professor in 1854. After completing his studies, he became a member of the Spree Tunnel literary association in Berlin, with which he remained associated throughout his life. He died on 7 July 1884 in Arnsdorf in the Giant Mountains.

== Scientific work ==
In 1846, while Eberty was still working in the judicial service, he published the 28-page work Die Gestirne und die Weltgeschichte: Gedanken über Raum, Zeit und Ewigkeit (The Stars and World History: Thoughts on Space, Time and Eternity) in Breslau under the pseudonym F.Y. The book contemplated a faraway observer seeing "the earth at this moment as it existed at the time of Abraham". It was translated into English and published in London in the same year, without an author being named. A year later, Eberty, still as F. Y., and under the same title with the addition of II. Heft, published a supplement.

In 1855, in the first edition of his Naturwissenschaftliche Volksbücher, Aaron Bernstein presented observations on space, time and the speed of light that "an unknown sharp-eyed thinker" had made in an anonymous writing. In his youth, Albert Einstein read these popular science books, which are considered to have had a formative influence on his interest and his future career.

In 1874, Eberty published a second German edition, this time under his full name. In the meantime, the work had enjoyed great success in England and the US. In the preface to the 1874 edition, Eberty states that the sixth edition was already out of print in London in 1854. W. von Voigts-Rhetz had considered this edition to be the work of an English-speaking anonymous author and translated it into German in 1859. Albert Einstein wrote a foreword for a new edition of The Stars and World History in 1923 in which he called Eberty "an original and ingenious person."

In his 2006 book Zwischen den Sternen: Lichtbildarchive (Between the Stars: Photographic Archives), image scholar Karl Clausberg claims that Eberty's writing influenced Camille Flammarion, Hermann von Helmholtz, Albert Einstein, Ludwig Klages and Thure von Uexküll as well as Walter Benjamin. He included a facsimile of Eberty's writing in his book and commented on it extensively.

The Einstein biographer Jürgen Neffe also sees an influence on the young Albert Einstein and writes about Eberty's writing: "Here we also find a decisive thought on the special theory of relativity: The moment travels with light."

== Publications ==
- Beweis der Lehrsätze Band 2. Heft 3. Nr. 54. S. 287. In: Crelles Journal für die reine und angewandte Mathematik Bd. 5 (1830), p. 107–109
- De vera unionis prolium notione. Typis Francisci Baadeni, Bonnae 1834 (zugleich: Dissertation, Universität Bonn, 1834).
- Die Gestirne und die Weltgeschichte. Gedanken über Raum, Zeit und Ewigkeit. (1. Heft), Schulz, Breslau 1846. (Pseudonym F. Y.)
- Die Gestirne und die Weltgeschichte. Gedanken über Raum, Zeit und Ewigkeit. 2. Heft. Aderholz, Breslau 1847. (Pseudonym F. Y.)
- Die Gestirne und die Weltgeschichte. Gedanken über Raum, Zeit und Ewigkeit. Kern, Breslau 1874.
- Die Gestirne und die Weltgeschichte. Gedanken über Raum, Zeit und Ewigkeit. (1. und 2. Heft) Mit einem Geleitwort von Albert Einstein. Hrsg. von Gregorius Itelson. Rogoff, Berlin 1923.
- Die Gestirne und die Weltgeschichte. Gedanken über Raum, Zeit und Ewigkeit. (1. und 2. Heft) Mit einem Geleitwort von Albert Einstein. Hrsg. von Werner Graf. Comino, Berlin 2014, ISBN 978-3-945831-01-4 (E-Book).
- Versuche auf dem Gebiet des Naturrechts. Leipzig 1852.
- Über Gut und Böse. Berlin 1855.
- Walter Scott. Ein Lebensbild. 2 Bände. Breslau 1860; 2. Auflage 1870 (mehrfach übersetzt).
- Die Sterne und die Erde. Leipzig 1860.
- Lord Byron. Eine Biographie. 2 Bände. Leipzig 1862; 2. Auflage 1879.
- Geschichte des preußischen Staats. 7 Bände. Breslau 1867–1873.
  - Band 1: 1411–1688. Breslau 1867, 718 Seiten (Digitalisat).
  - Band 2: 1688–1740. Breslau 1868, 702 Seiten (Digitalisat).
  - Band 3: 1740–1756. Breslau 1868, 424 Seiten (Digitalisat).
  - Band 4: 1756–1763. Breslau 1869, 368 Seiten (Digitalisat).
  - Band 5: 1763–1806. Breslau 1870 (Digitalisat).
- Jugenderinnerungen eines alten Berliners. Berlin 1878 (Digitalisat).
  - Nach handschriftlichen Aufzeichnungen des Verfassers von J. von Bülow ergänzte und neu herausgegebene Ausgabe. Verlag für Kulturpolitik, Berlin 1925.
  - Neuausgabe der erweiterten Ausgabe von 1925, ergänzt um fehlende Kapitel der Ausgabe von 1878 und mit Anmerkungen versehen, Nachwort von Theodor Fontane. Berlin 2015, ISBN 978-3-945831-05-2.
