= Heinrich von Bülow (Grotekop) =

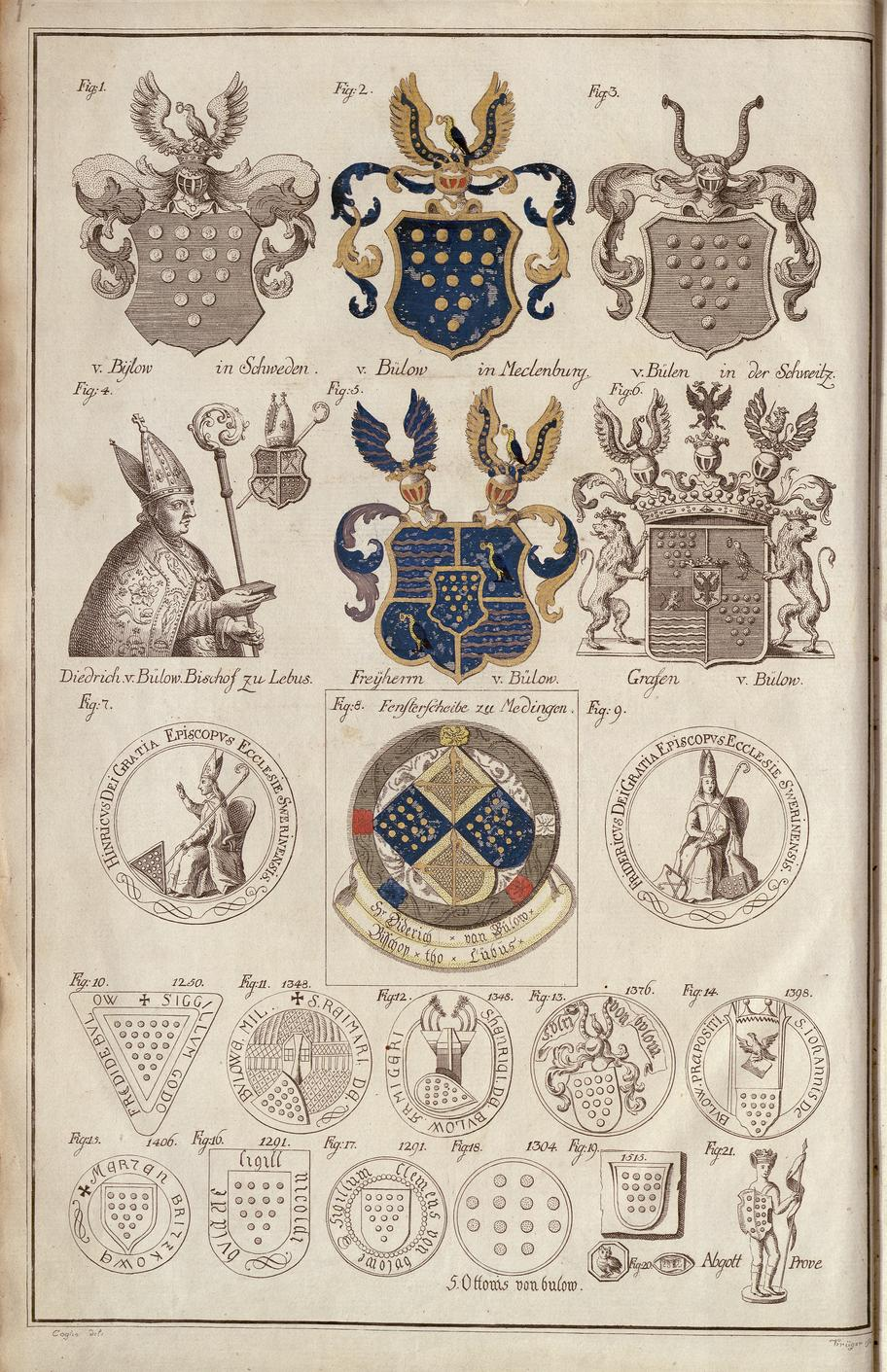
von Bülow Arms

Heinrich von Bülow also known as Big Top (Grotekop) was a knight born in the middle of the fourteenth century. He died either before 1395 or during 1415. He prospered as a warrior-supporter of Prince Albrecht of Mecklenburg (and of Sweden). Outside Mecklenburg, Heinrich Grotekop is still remembered in many quarters as an archetypal robber baron on account of his appetite for feuding.

== Provenance and family ==
The von Bülow family is an old aristocratic family from Northern Germany. Heinrich von Bülow was called Big Head (Grotekop) on account of his ancestral home at Castle Preensberg, some 10 km (6.2 mi) to the east of Wismar, close to the main trade route to Rostock, and located in a village now known as Benz. The first recorded mention of the place dates from 1376. Heinrich was the son of another Heinrich von Bülow, and also had five brothers with whom he worked closely.

== Life ==
Heinrich von Bülow first made his mark in 1383 when he invaded the little town of Wilsnack, as part of a vendetta in which he was engaged against the Bishop of Havelberg. He burnt the place, including its church, to the ground. An unplanned outcome of this destruction was a strong economic resurgence in Wilsnack which continued nearly to the time of the Reformation. This arose through the discovery of three undamaged portions of The Host (Christ’s blood) after the fire. For the next 170 years hundreds of thousands of pilgrims came to visit the Holy Blood of Wilsnack.

In 1385 fate turned savagely against Heinrich when of Prince Albrecht III, who was also the king of Sweden, formed an alliance with the powerful Free and Hanseatic City of Lübeck, and along with the Hanseatic League member cities Wismar und Rostock launched a punitive attack on the disruptive robber baron. Twenty of von Bülow's strongholds were sought out and destroyed by this alliance, led by the Mayor of Lübeck, Thomas Morkerke and Hinrich Westhof, another freeman member of Lübeck’s ruling class and a man who would himself later become its mayor. The destroyed strongholds included von Bülow’s main base at Castle Preensberg, and were presumably mostly Motte or Motte-and-bailey style fortifications. Heinrich appears never to have rebuilt them, and today barely a trace of them remains.

1389 saw Heinrich von Bülow appointed as a leading warlord under of the King. His importance, by this time, in Mecklenburg’s power structure is apparent from the fact that together with his brother he is recorded as holding Plau am See as collateral in respect of a mortgage on Neustadt-Glewe and Dömitz. The value of the debt was 14,000 Lübeck Marks, which was a very large amount at that time. Heinrich will by now have been living in the castle at Neustadt-Glewe.

Evidence as to the year of Heinrich’s death is contradictory. He may already have been dead by 1395 in which case he would not have been able to purchase the freedom of his lord, Albrecht III, imprisoned by Queen Margaret of Denmark, as recorded in the Treaty of Helsingborg (1395).

== Printed sources ==
- Jakob Friedrich Joachim Bülow: Mit Kupfern und vielen Urkunden versehene, historische, genealogische und critische Beschreibung des Edlen, Freyherr- und Gräflichen Geschlechts von Bülow. Korb, Neubrandenburg 1780 (Digitalisat)
- Adolf v. Bülow: Bülowsches Familienbuch. 2 Bände. Schwerin 1911–1914
