= Margarethe von Bülow =

German novelist

- Born: 23 February 1860; Berlin
- Died: 2 January 1884 (aged 23); Rummelsburg
- Occupation: Novelist
- Writing career
- Language: German

Baroness Margarethe von Bülow (1860–1884) was a German novelist. She died while saving a drowning child.

== Life ==
Margarethe Freifräulein von Bülow was born into the Bülow family in Berlin on 23 February 1860. She was the daughter of diplomat Hugo Freiherr von Bülow. She grew up in various countries, including England. She was close to her elder sister, the novelist Frieda von Bülow. She was also a literary protégé of the literary critic and satirist Fritz Mauthner.

Von Bülow drowned in Berlin on 2 January 1884, after saving the life of a boy who had fallen through the ice while skating on the Rummelsburger See lake. Mauthner and her sister Frieda edited her writings for posthumous publication.

== Works ==
- Novellen. Berlin: Hertz Verlag, 1885
- Jonas Briccius: Erzählung. Leipzig: Grunow Verlag, 1886.
- Aus der Chronik derer von Riffelshausen: Erzählung. Leipzig: Grunow Verlag, 1887.
- Neue Novellen. Berlin: Verlag Walther & Apolant, 1890.
- Novellen einer Frühvollendeten: Ausgewähltes: Mit einer Einleitung von Adolf Bartels. Leipzig: R. Voigtländer's Verlag, 1920.
