= Busso X von Alvensleben =

German bishop (1468–1548)

The Most Reverend Busso II von Alvensleben
- Bishop of Havelberg
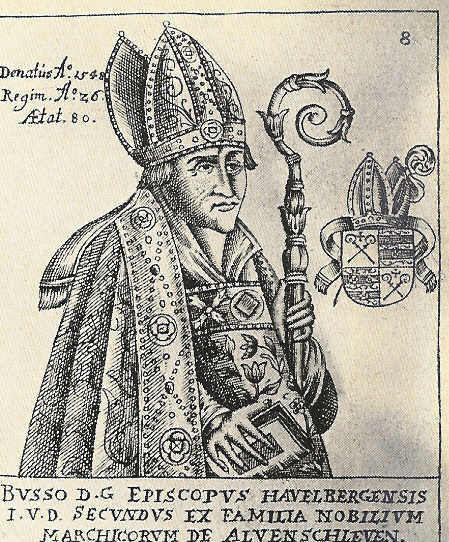
- Church: Roman Catholic
- Diocese: Havelberg
- Appointed: 26 September 1522
- Term ended: 4 May 1548
- Predecessor: Hieronymus Schulz
- Successor: Frederick II of Brandenburg

Orders
- Ordination: 10 November 1522

Personal details
- Born: 1468
- Died: 4 May 1548 (aged 79–80) Wittstock
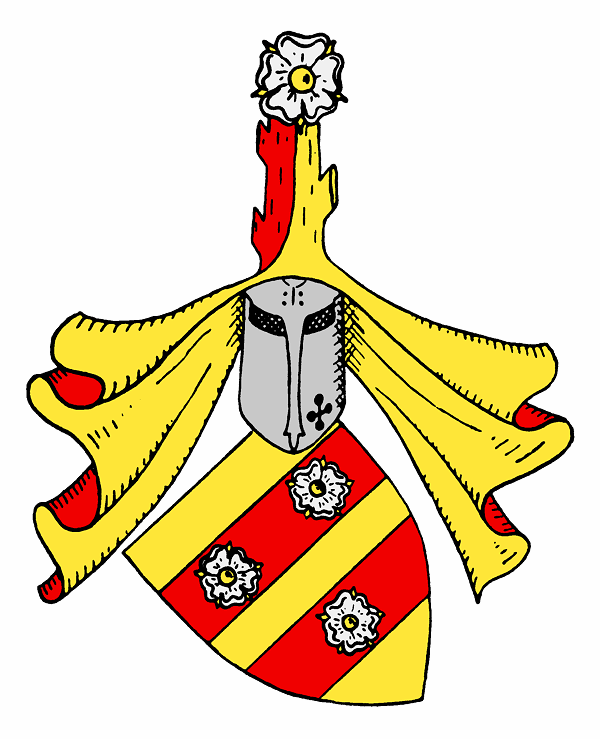
- Coat of arms

Busso X von Alvensleben (1468 – 4 May 1548 in Wittstock) was a Catholic ecclesiastical diplomat and from 1523 to 1548 as Busso II, the last Catholic Bishop of Havelberg.

== Life ==
He came from the Low German noble family of Alvensleben and was the third son of Gebhard XVI. von Alvensleben, a Brandenburg councilor and lord of Kalbe (Milde) and Hundisburg, and Hippolyta von Bülow. Like his cousin Busso VIII von Alvensleben, he received an academic education at the University of Leipzig (1488) and from 1492 in Bologna, where from 1496 Nicolaus Copernicus from Thorn (registered as "Dom. Nicolaus Kopperlingk de Thorn") also studied. In 1498 he was appointed "Procurator of the German Nation" in Bologna. H. elected representative of the German students. In 1504 he received his doctorate there as a doctor of both laws.

In 1508 he became canon of Magdeburg and as such entrusted with various diplomatic missions. In 1513 he prepared the election of Albert of Brandenburg as Archbishop of Magdeburg and administrator of the bishopric of Halberstadt. In 1514 he obtained papal approval in Rome for the election of Archbishop Albert of Magdeburg as Elector of Mainz and for the union of both archdioceses in one hand.

In 1515 Busso became provost of Brandenburg, Salzwedel, and Stendal. As governor of the frequently absent Cardinal Albert in Magdeburg, he completed the construction of the cathedral there in 1520. On the advice of Pope Leo X, he was one of the organizers of the sale of indulgences that triggered the publication of Luther's theses in Wittenberg in 1517.

In 1522 he became Bishop of Havelberg. He preferably resided in the bishop's castle in Wittstock and on the Plattenburg. When Elector Joachim II of Brandenburg joined the Reformation in 1539, Busso prevented the introduction of Lutheranism in the Brandenburg church order, which it adopted in 1540. He remained bishop until his death on 4 May 1548.

He was the last Catholic bishop in Brandenburg and was buried in front of the high altar of St. Mary's Cathedral in Wittstock. His tombstone was lost after renovations in the 1920s. As bishop, he put on a collection of relics and precious church utensils - following the example of Cardinal Albert's Halle sanctuaries.

== Works ==
(according to Johann Christoph Adelung: Continuation and Additions to Christian Gottlieb Jöcher's general scholarly Lexico. 1784)

- Missale ecclesiae Havelbergensis. 1506.
- Librum statutorum ad clerum suae diocesis. 1528.
- Woodcut in George Gottfried Küster: Martin Friedrich Seidel's picture collection. Publisher of the bookshop at the Real-Schule, Berlin 1751, p. 21

== Literature ==
- S. Lenz: Stifts-Historie von Havelberg. 1750
- Johann Christoph Adelung: Fortsetzung und Ergänzungen zu Christian Gottlieb Jöchers allgemeinem Gelehrten-Lexico. Erster Band, Leipzig 1784, S. 671
- Siegmund Wilhelm Wohlbrück: Geschichtliche Nachrichten von dem Geschlechte von Alvensleben und dessen Gütern. Band II, Berlin 1819, S. 231–250
- Gustav Toepke: Von der Universität Bologna. In: Zeitschrift des Harzvereins für Geschichte und Altertumskunde 13 (1880). S. 488–491
- Felix Priebatsch: Werner v. der Schulenburg, Albrecht v. Klitzing, Busso v. Alvensleben – drei brandenburgische Diplomaten des 15. Jahrhunderts. In: Forschungen zur brandenburgischen und preußischen Geschichte (FBPG). Band VII/2, 1894, S. 218–223
- Gustav C. Knod: Deutsche Studenten in Bologna (1289–1562). R. v. Decker's Verlag, G. Schenck, 1899, S. 12
- Leopold von Ranke: Deutsche Geschichte im Zeitalter der Reformation. Historisch-kritische Ausgabe, hrsg. von Paul Joachimsen. 5 Bände, 1925
- Gustav Abb und Gottfried Wentz: Das Bistum Brandenburg I. (= Germania Sacra I/1). 1929, S. 119f.
- Gottfried Wentz: Das Bistum Havelberg. (= Germania Sacra I/2). 1933, S. 74f.
- Udo von Alvensleben (1953). "Alvensleben, Busso von". Neue Deutsche Biographie (in German). Vol. 1. Berlin: Duncker & Humblot. pp. 232–232. (full text online).
- Udo v. Alvensleben-Wittenmoor: Alvenslebensche Burgen und Landsitze. Dortmund 1960, S. 14
- Friedrich Wilhelm Bautz: Alvensleben, Busso von. In: Biographisch-Bibliographisches Kirchenlexikon (BBKL). Band 1, Bautz, Hamm 1975. 2., unveränderte Auflage Hamm 1990, ISBN 3-88309-013-1, Sp. 136.
- Udo von Alvensleben-Wittenmoor: Die Alvensleben in Kalbe 1324-1945, bearbeitet von Reimar von Alvensleben, Falkenberg August 2010 (180 S), digital auf der Homepage von Henning Krüger, 2015, Geschichte(n) über Kalbe (Milde), retrieved 2 June 2016

== Links ==
- familie-von-alvensleben.de
- Biography at catholic-hierarchy.org

Preceded by Hieronymus Schulz	Bishop of Havelberg; 1522–1548	Succeeded by Frederick II of Brandenburg
