= Babette von Bülow =

German writer

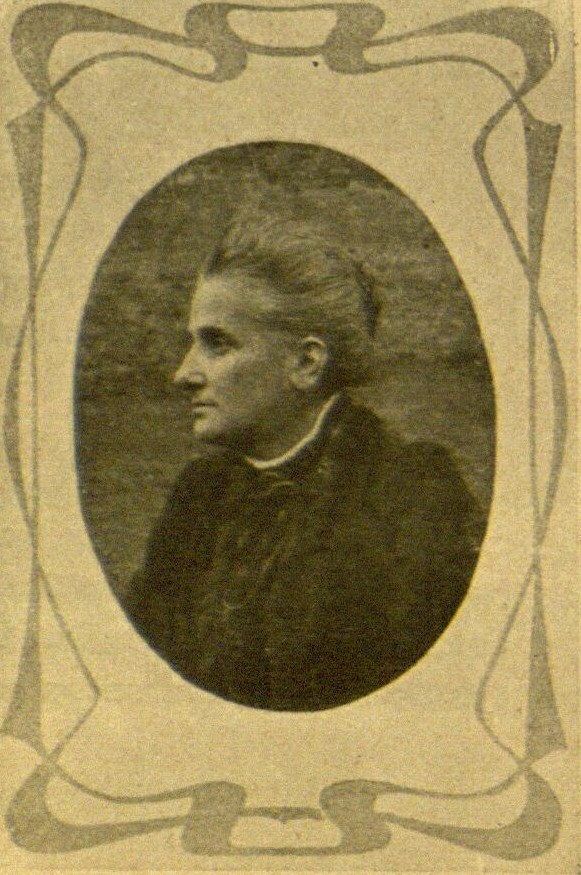
Babette von Bülow

Clara Bertha Friederike von Bülow (known as Babette von Bülow; pen name, Hans Arnold; 30 September 1850 – 8 March 1927) was a German writer of short stories, comedies and farces.

== Biography ==
Clara Bertha Friederike Eberty was born in Cieplice Śląskie-Zdrój on 30 September 1850. She was the daughter of the lawyer, writer and amateur astronomer, Felix Eberty, professor at the University of Breslau and Mary Hasse. She grew up in Breslau where she studied in a French school and married Lieutenant Colonel Adolf von Bülow on 10 June 1876. The military career of her husband led them to live in different garrisons such as Hanover in 1893, Erfurt in 1896, Frankfurt Oder in 1900, Potsdam in 1902 and again from 1905 in Erfurt. She personally knew Theodor Fontane. She died in Arendsee, Kühlungsborn, Mecklenburg-Vorpommern in 1927.

== Selected works ==
- Novellen (1881)
- Neue Novellen (1884)
- Geburtstagsfreuden (1884)
- Fünf neue Novellen (1885)
- Berlin-Ostende mit zehntägigem Retourbillet (1886)
- Ein neues Novellenbuch (1886)
- Der Umzug und andere Novellen (1889)
- Theorie und Praxis (Lustspiel, 1890)
- Lustige Geschichten (1890)
- Zwei Friedfertige (Schwank, 1891)
- Einst im Mai! und andere Novellen (1892)
- Dornen um die Rose (1893)
- Sonnenstäubchen. Neue Novellen (1894)
- Theorie und Praxis (Lustspiel, 1895)
- Aus alten und neuen Tagen (1896)
- Maskiert und andere Novellen (1898)
- Christel und andere Novellen (1899)
- Zwei Affen und andere Novellen (1902)
- Perücke? Neue Novellen (1904)
- Herbstsonne. Neue Novellen (1907)
- Vom „Drachenfels“ des Lebens. Beobachtungen und Betrachtungen (1907)
- Ausgewählte Novellen (1907)
- Aus der Kinderzeit. Erinnerungen (1909)

== Sources ==
- Fritz Abshoff: Bildende Geister. Band 1. Oestergaard, Berlin 1905, S. 20.
- Franz Brümmer: Lexikon der deutschen Dichter und Prosaisten vom Beginn des 19. Jahrhunderts bis zur Gegenwart. Reclam, Leipzig 1913, S. 377.
- Heinrich Otto Meisner (1955). "Bülow, von". Neue Deutsche Biographie (in German). Vol. 2. Berlin: Duncker & Humblot. pp. 727–728. (full text online). (Erwähnung im Familienartikel)
- Walther Killy, Hans Fromm: Literatur-Lexikon. Autoren und Werke deutscher Sprache. Bertelsmann Lexikon, München 1988, ISBN 3-570-04672-9, S. 293.
- Gisela Brinker-Gabler: Deutsche Literatur von Frauen. Verlag C.H. Beck, München 1988, ISBN 3-406-33118-1, S. 160.
- Susanne Kord: Ein Blick hinter die Kulissen. Deutschsprachige Dramatikerinnen im 18. und 19. Jahrhundert. Metzler, Stuttgart 1992, S. 345.
