= Matthias Döring =

German theologian and historian

Matthias Döring (in the 1390s – 24 July 1469) was a German Franciscan historian and theologian. He was born and died at Kyritz, Brandenburg.

== Life ==
He joined the Friars Minor in his native place, studied at the University of Oxford, was graduated (1424) at Erfurt as doctor of theology, and for some years taught theology and Biblical exegesis. In 1427 he was elected provincial of his order for Saxony.

In the disputes between the Conventuals and Observantines he took an active part. In 1443 at Bern the Conventuals elected him minister-general. This position he held for six years, receiving approbation from the General Council of Basle. In this council he had been prominent since 1432 as a reformer, and an adherent of the supremacy of a general council over the pope.

He was sent by it to Denmark, to win over the king and the people, and assisted in the deposition (1439) of Pope Eugene IV and the election of the antipope Felix V. Excommunicated by the Archbishop of Magdeburg he appealed to Rome. In 1461 he resigned his office and spent the last years of his life in literary work at the convent of Kyritz.

== Works ==
Döring was said to be the author of the Confutation primatus Papae, written (1443) anonymously and without title. Name and title were added when the article was edited in 1550 by Matthias Flacius Illyricus. It is in part an extract from the Defensor pacis of Marsilius of Padua (printed in Goldast, Monarchia, I, 557 sqq.).

Other works attributed to Döring are Defensorium postillae Nicolai Lyrani, against the Spanish bishop, Paul of Burgos, since 1481 frequently printed with the Postillae; Liber perplexorum Ecclesiae (lost); continuation (1420 to 1464) of the Chronicle of Dietrich Engelhus. He also wrote on the Donation of Constantine and (1444) on the relics of the Precious Blood of Wilsnack.
