= Karen Bulow =

Danish-born Canadian textile artist

Karen Bulow (1899 – 1982) was a Danish-born Canadian textile artist.

She arrived in Montreal in 1929 with a loom and a sewing machine. She began to sell handwoven goods, and as demand for her fabrics increased, she established Canada Homespuns. Canada Homespuns is believed to be Canada's first professional weaving studio; it employed as many as 70 weavers. From 1933 to 1949, she operated her own weaving school, and many of her pupils went on to become instructors themselves. Her products became iconic Canadian items, carried in high-end stores as well as Eaton's and Simpsons. Bulow also received commissions from various companies, including Trans-Canada Air Lines, Canadian National Railway, Canadian Pacific Railway and the Bank of Nova Scotia. She sold her company, later known as Karen Bulow Ltd., in 1960. At the request of the Canadian government, she helped establish a weaving studio for Inuit at Pangnirtung. In 1976, she was named an honorary member in the Canadian Crafts Council and she was also admitted to the Royal Canadian Academy.
