= Frieda von Bülow =

German novelist

- Born: 12 October 1857; Berlin
- Died: 3 December 1909 (aged 52); Dornburg
- Occupation: Novelist
- Writing career
- Language: German

Baroness Frieda von Bülow (born 1857 in Berlin; died 1909 in Dornburg) was a German writer and traveller. She is credited with creating the German colonial novel genre.

== Life ==
Her father was Prussian diplomat Hugo von Bülow (1821–1869), who worked as Prussian consul in Smyrna. Her sister was German novelist Margarethe von Bülow (1860-1884).

Frieda von Bülow became an active supporter of the German colonial movement after it was started in 1884. She founded the Frauenverein für Krankenpflege in den Kolonien (Women’s Association for Nursing in the Colonies) and served on the board of the Deutsch-Ostafrikanische Evangelische Missionsgesellschaft (German East African Evangelical Mission Society), promoting the establishment of a mission hospital in Dunda on the Kigan River. Between 1885 and 1889 she lived in Zanzibar and German East Africa, where she visited her brother Albrecht von Bülow and met the colonial leader Carl Peters, with whom she collaborated and for whom she developed an unreciprocated affection. Their relationship inspired her later novel Im Lande der Verheißung (1899). In October 1886, von Bülow co-founded the Deutschnationaler Frauenbund (German National Women’s League) together with Countess Martha von Pfeil and her sister Eva and organized charity events in support of hospitals in East Africa, linking Protestant missionary activity with nationalist and colonial goals. Her unconventional lifestyle and social independence, however, drew criticism, and she was dismissed from the League’s board in 1888.

After contracting malaria, von Bülow returned to Berlin in 1889 and began her literary career, publishing novels and novellas focused on colonial life in German East Africa. In 1893 and 1894 she attempted to manage her late brother Albrecht’s plantations near Mount Kilimanjaro, but the venture failed. She subsequently settled permanently in Germany. During her later years, she lived with her sister Sophie at Dornburg Castle in Thuringia.

== Themes and legacy ==
During her time in German East Africa, von Bülow produced diaries and novels that reflected and reinforced the ideology of German colonialism. According to Robrecht De Boodt and Anke Gilleir, von Bülow’s East African writings demonstrate the ways in which white women were complicit in the colonial project and sought to assert epistemic authority through personal observation and “empirical” experience in a field otherwise dominated by men. Her travel sketches, such as Reiseskizzen und Tagebuchblätter aus Deutsch-Ostafrika (1889), reveal a paternalistic gaze toward the colonized, whom she describes in terms that affirm racial hierarchy and cultural difference. In her reflections on her departure from Africa, von Bülow explicitly framed her work as part of a national duty, expressing the wish that “only the best of the nation” should represent German interests in the colonies, underscoring her commitment to the imperial enterprise.

Von Bülow viewed the presence of white women in the colonies as essential to securing German national influence, arguing that only German women could ensure “die Gewinnung und Festigung deutschen Einflusses” (“the acquisition and consolidation of German influence”). Her writings promoted the idea that women’s roles in the colonies were both moral and political, helping to shape imperial notions of domesticity, family, and race. As scholars Elisabeth Krimmer and Chunjie Zhang note, von Bülow’s work exemplifies how colonial texts by women inverted the categories of victim and perpetrator, often portraying Europeans as benefactors exploited by the colonized.

Von Bülow’s most famous novel, Tropenkoller (1896), is often cited as the first example of the German colonial novel. In it, she portrays strong European women in the tropical colonies whose physical and moral resilience contrasts with the perceived weakness of their male counterparts.

== Works ==
- Reiseskizzen und Tagebuchblätter aus Deutsch-Ostafrika [Travel sketches and diary pages from German East Africa]. Berlin, 1889. English translation: Travel Sketches and Diary Jottings from German East Africa (2026).
- Am anderen Ende der Welt [At the other end of the world]. Novel, 1890.
- Der Konsul. Vaterländischer Roman aus unseren Tagen [The Consul: A Patriotic Novel of Our Times]. 1891.
- Deutsch-Ostafrikanische Novellen [German-East African Novellas]. Berlin, 1892.
- Ludwig von Rosen. Eine Erzählung aus zwei Welten [Ludwig von Rosen: A Tale from Two Worlds]. Berlin, 1892.
- Margarethe und Ludwig. [Margaret and Ludwig]. Novel, Berlin 1892.
- Tropenkoller. Episode aus dem deutschen Kolonialleben [Tropical fever: An episode from German colonial life]. Berlin, 1896. Digitalised by Stanford University.
- Einsame Frauen [Lonely women]. Novella, 1897.
- Kara. Novel, 1897.
- Anna Stern. Novel, 1898.
- Wir von heute. Zwei Erzählungen [We of today: two stories]. 1898.
- Im Lande der Verheissung. Ein deutscher Kolonial-Roman [In the Land of Promise: A German Colonial Novel]. Dresden, 1899.
- Abendkinder [Evening children]. Novel, 1900.
- Im Hexenring. Eine Sommergeschichte vom Lande [In the Witch's Ring: A Summer Story from the Countryside]. Novel, Stuttgart: J. Engelhorn, 1901.
- Hüter der Schwelle [Guardian of the Threshold]. Novel, 1902.
- Die stilisierte Frau. Sie und er [The stylized woman. She and he]. Two novellas, 1902.
- Allein ich will! [Only I want!]. Novel, 1903.
- Im Zeichen der Ernte. Italienisches Landleben von heute. [In the spirit of harvest: Italian rural life today]. Novel, 1904.
- Irdische Liebe. Eine Alltagsgeschichte [Earthly Love: An Everyday Story]. Novel, 1905.
- Die Tochter [The daughter]. Novel, 1906.
- Das Portugiesenschloss. Erzählung von der ostafrikanischen Küste [The Portuguese Castle: A Tale from the East African Coast]. 1907.
- Freie Liebe [Free love]. Novella, 1909.
- Die Schwestern. Geschichte einer Mädchenjugend. [The Sisters: A Girl's Story]. Novel, Dresde,n 1909.
- Frauentreue. [Women's loyalty]. Novel, Dresden, 1910.
