= Holy Blood of Wilsnack =

Coordinates: 52°57′22″N 11°56′46″E

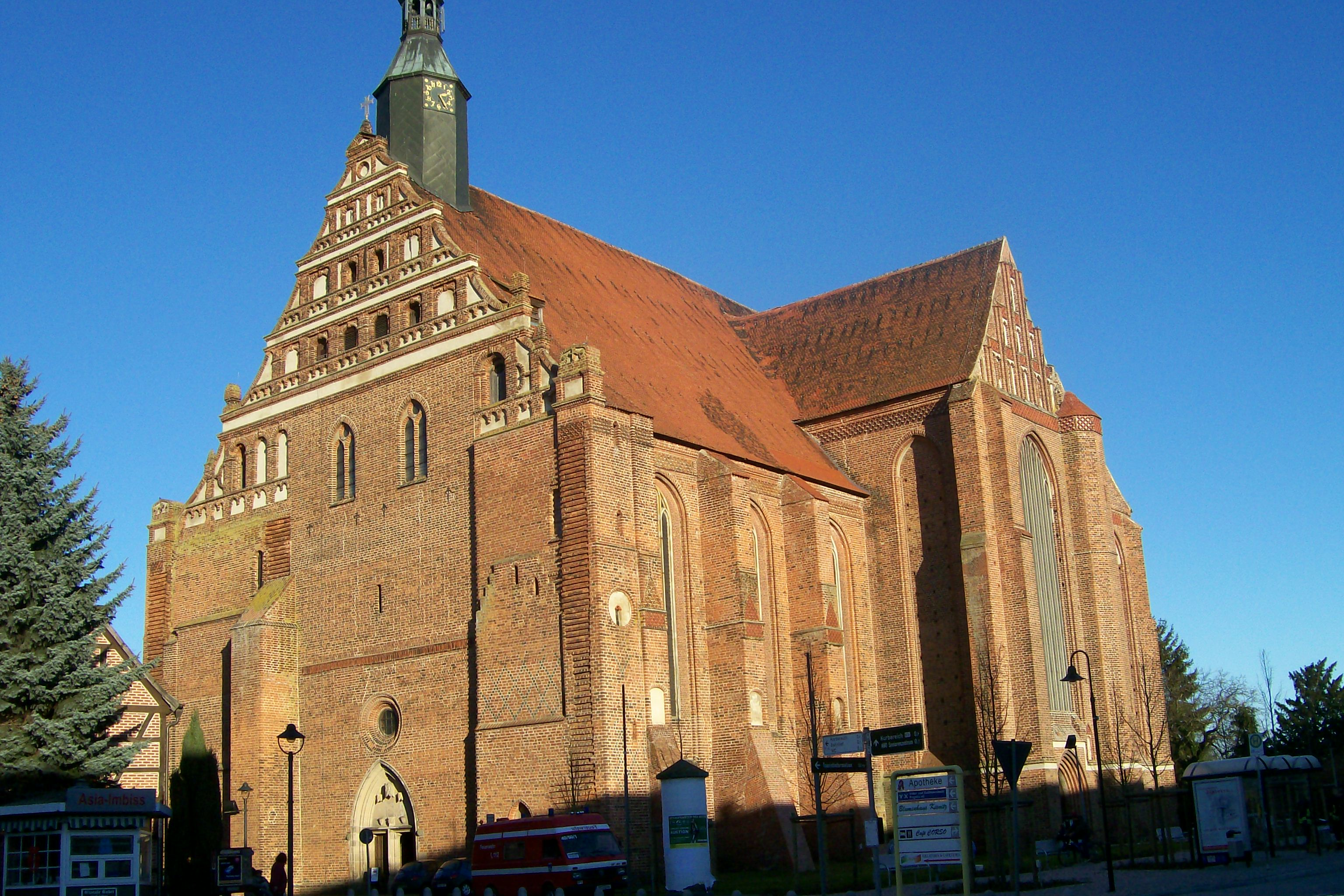
St. Nicholas' Church (Church of the Holy Blood), in Bad Wilsnack

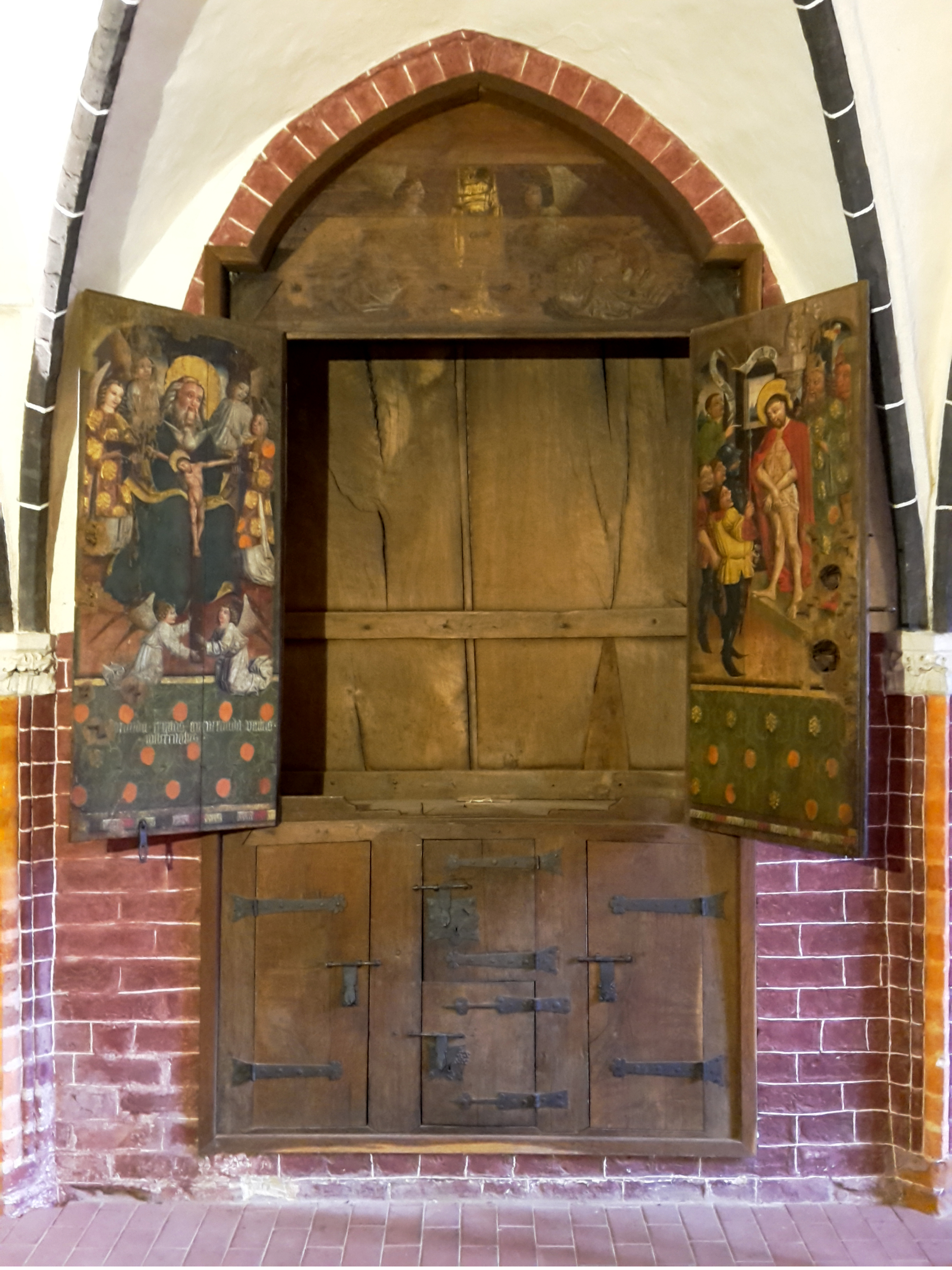
Holy Blood Shrine

The Holy Blood of Wilsnack was the name given to three hosts, which survived a fire in 1383 that burned the church and village to the ground. The hosts were thus seen as miraculous. The relics became the destination of medieval religious pilgrimages to Bad Wilsnack, Germany for nearly two centuries. Revenue from the many pilgrims enabled the town to build the large St. Nicholas' Church (also known as Holy Blood Church) at the site. The hosts were destroyed in 1558 during the Protestant Reformation.

== History ==
In 1383 a quarrel broke out between one of the knights of the Prignitz, Heinrich von Bülow and the Bishop of Havelberg, Dietrich Man. Von Bülow raided Wilsnack, one of the bishopric's villages, and burned it to the ground. Entering the ruins of his church, the parish priest found that in the Sacrarium on the altar were three hosts. They were untouched by the fire but stained with blood. Bishop Dietrich acted to consecrate the hosts so as to avoid accidental idolatry, but the central one overflowed with blood before he could pronounce the Words of Consecration.

They became objects of veneration, and miracles began to be attributed to them. The quickly increasing pilgrimage emerged as one of the major European attractions in the 15th century. One pilgrimage led from the Marienkirche in Berlin to Wilsnack. So many pilgrims came that they rivaled the numbers of those to Santiago de Compostela.

== Controversy ==
The large numbers of pilgrims spread prosperity through a formerly poverty-stricken area. The revenue that the pilgrims generated, enabled the diocese to build the church of St. Nicholas. Pilgrims paid for tokens made in the shape of three hosts, which they presented as offerings. Archaeologists in the area continue to find examples of such artifacts. In 1395, Johann III Wöplitz, Bishop of Havelberg, incorporated the church into his episcopal household so that two-thirds of the income flowed directly to the bishopric. Luther and others criticized it as providing an incentive for church officials to encourage dubious shrines.

In 1405, Zbyněk Zajíc of Hazmburk, Archbishop of Prague, established a committee to look into the phenomenon. This committee concluded that the alleged miracles reported at the shrine were fraudulent. The archbishop then forbade those who lived within his jurisdiction from making pilgrimages to the site. This, however, did not stop others. Among the pilgrims to the site was the English mystic Margery Kempe in 1433, who referred to the visit in her The Book of Margery Kempe.

In 1412, Günther II of Schwarzburg, Metropolitan Archbishop of Magdeburg ordered an investigation, which found that the shrine bred confusion in that the mostly poor pilgrims could not comprehend the theological issues. An archdiocesan synod condemned the pilgrimages, did not suppress them. The Bishop of Havelberg was able to ignore his metropolitan superior because he had the support of Elector Frederick II of Brandenburg.

The "holy blood" of Wilsnack was attacked by the reformer Jan Hus and the University of Erfurt. Franciscan Matthias Döring wrote in support of the shrine.

Some contemporary religious figures like Nicholas of Cusa discouraged pilgrimage to Wilsnack, questioning the nature of these wonder hosts and suspecting fraud. As Cardinal-legate, he tried to forbid pilgrimages there. Pope Eugene IV compromised by requiring that a freshly consecrated host be displayed alongside the relics.The controversy continued for more than a century.

By 1475, there were a series of children's pilgrimages that proved very disruptive as the youth were joined by vagabonds. The town of Erfurt barred them by locking its gates.

The common people persisted in making pilgrimages to see the hosts, which were important objects of devotion until destroyed by Protestant reformers in 1552.

== Sources ==
- Ludecus, Matthaeus, Historia von der erfindung, Wunderwercken und zerstörung des vermeinten heiligen Bluts zur Wilssnagk: sampt den hierüber und dawider ergangenen schreiben, Wittenberg [Germany] : Clemens Schleich, 1586 [with a woodcut of the shrine].
- Walker Bynum, Caroline: Wonderful Blood: Theology and Practice in Late Medieval Northern Germany and Beyond, University of Pennsylvania Press, 2007. ISBN 978-0-8122-3985-0
- Walker Bynum, Caroline: "Bleeding Hosts and their Contact Relics in Late Medieval Northern Germany", in The Medieval History Journal 2004, 7, 227
