= Bülow family =

German noble family

Bülow
- Noble family
- Country: Germany; Denmark; Sweden; Norway; Netherlands; United Kingdom
- Founded: 13th century
- Titles: Count; Baron
- Estate: Several

The House of Bülow (German pronunciation: [ˈbyːloː]) is an old German noble family with a Danish branch. Of Mecklenburg origin, its members have borne the title of Baron (Freiherr), Count (Graf) or Prince (Fürst).

== History ==
The family traces its main line back to one knight Godofridus de Bulowe, mentioned in a 1229 deed. He was named after the village of Bülow near Königsfeld, then part of the Bishopric of Ratzeburg. The family made great donations to nearby Rehna Abbey.

As Bülow was also a word for oriole in the local dialect based on Wendish roots, the bird is depicted as a crest in the family's coat of arms.

In Mecklenburg the family acquired around 110 estates, castles or villages from 1229 onwards, nine of which remained in its possession until the confiscations in communist East Germany in 1945. From 1470 to this day the family holds the manor of Gudow in Saxe-Lauenburg (today part of the former West-German state of Schleswig-Holstein), and in the 19th century it acquired three more estates nearby, also still owned by family members.

In the 14th century, four members officiated as Bishops of Schwerin; one Dietrich von Bülow was Bishop of Lebus from 1490 onwards. Numerous female members joined the convent of Dobbertin Abbey. In 1383 the Mecklenburg knight Heinrich von Bülow burnt down the village and church of Wilsnack; thereafter, the rebuilt Church of the Holy Blood of Wilsnack became a destination of medieval religious pilgrimages.

== Notable members ==
The most notable family members are Hans von Bülow (1830–1894), pianist, conductor and composer who married Liszt's daughter Cosima, who later left him for Richard Wagner, and Prince Bernhard von Bülow (1849–1929), Chancellor of Germany from 1900 to 1909.

== Heraldry ==
The blazon of the family's coat of arms is: Azure, fourteen bezants in pile, displayed four, four, three, two, one. The family's heraldic animal is the oriole, which can be seen in the armorial crest below.

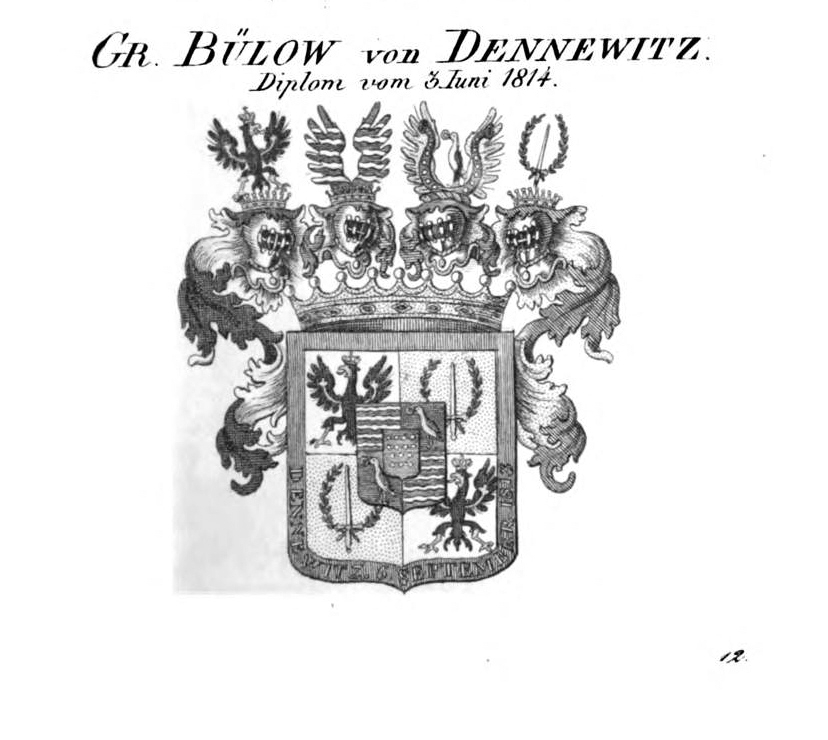
Graf Bülow von Dennewitz (1814)

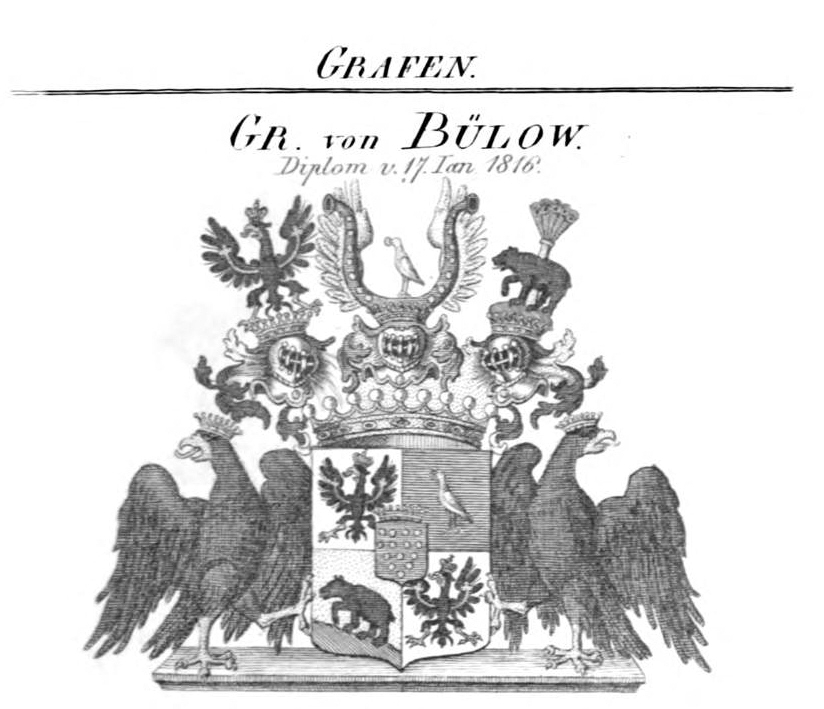
Graf von Bülow (1816)

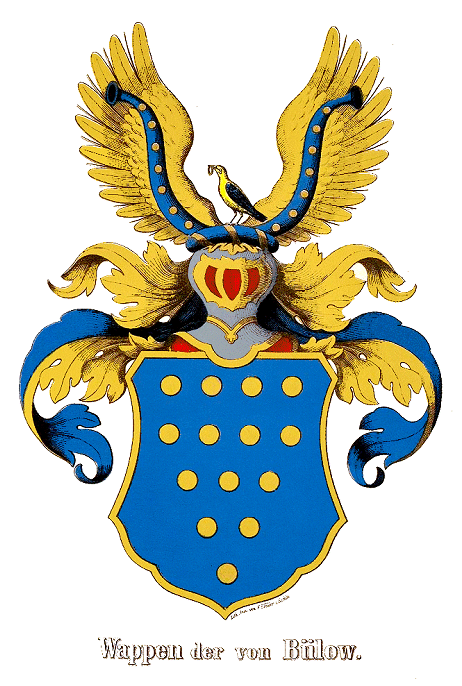
Arms of the Bülow family (1858)

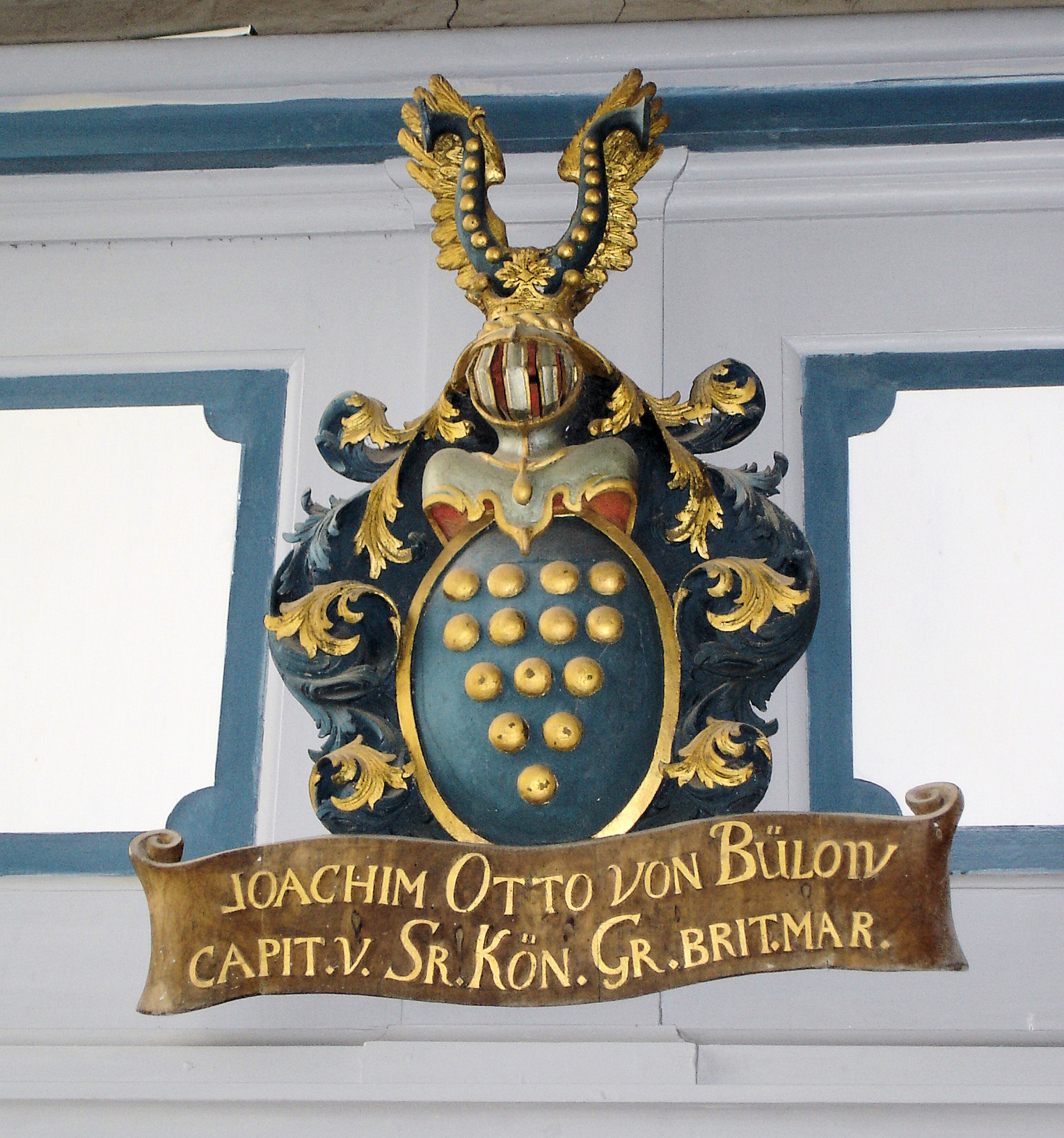
Epitaph in Friedrichshagen church

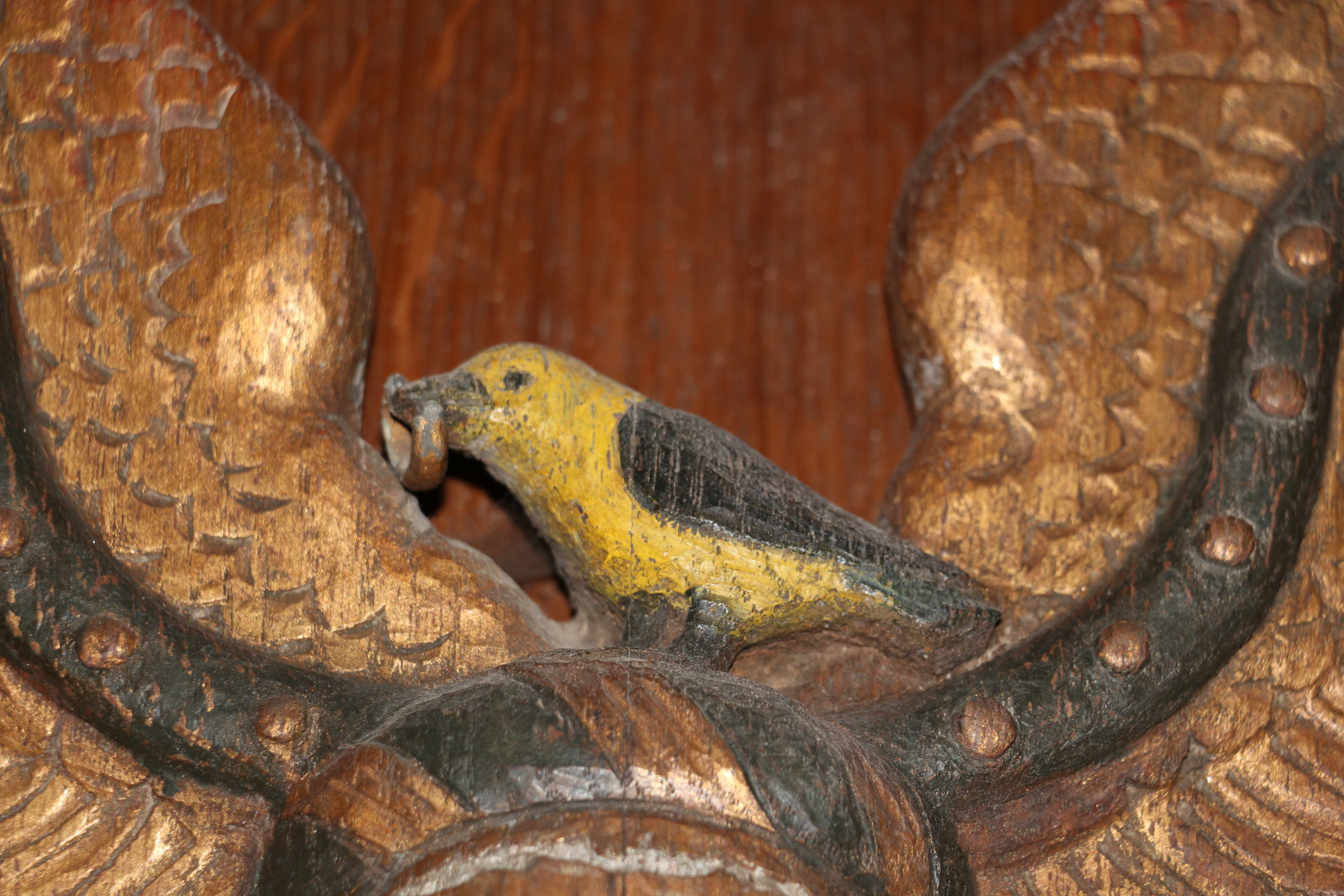
The oriole as crest, at Doberan Minster
