= Plattenburg =

- Municipality
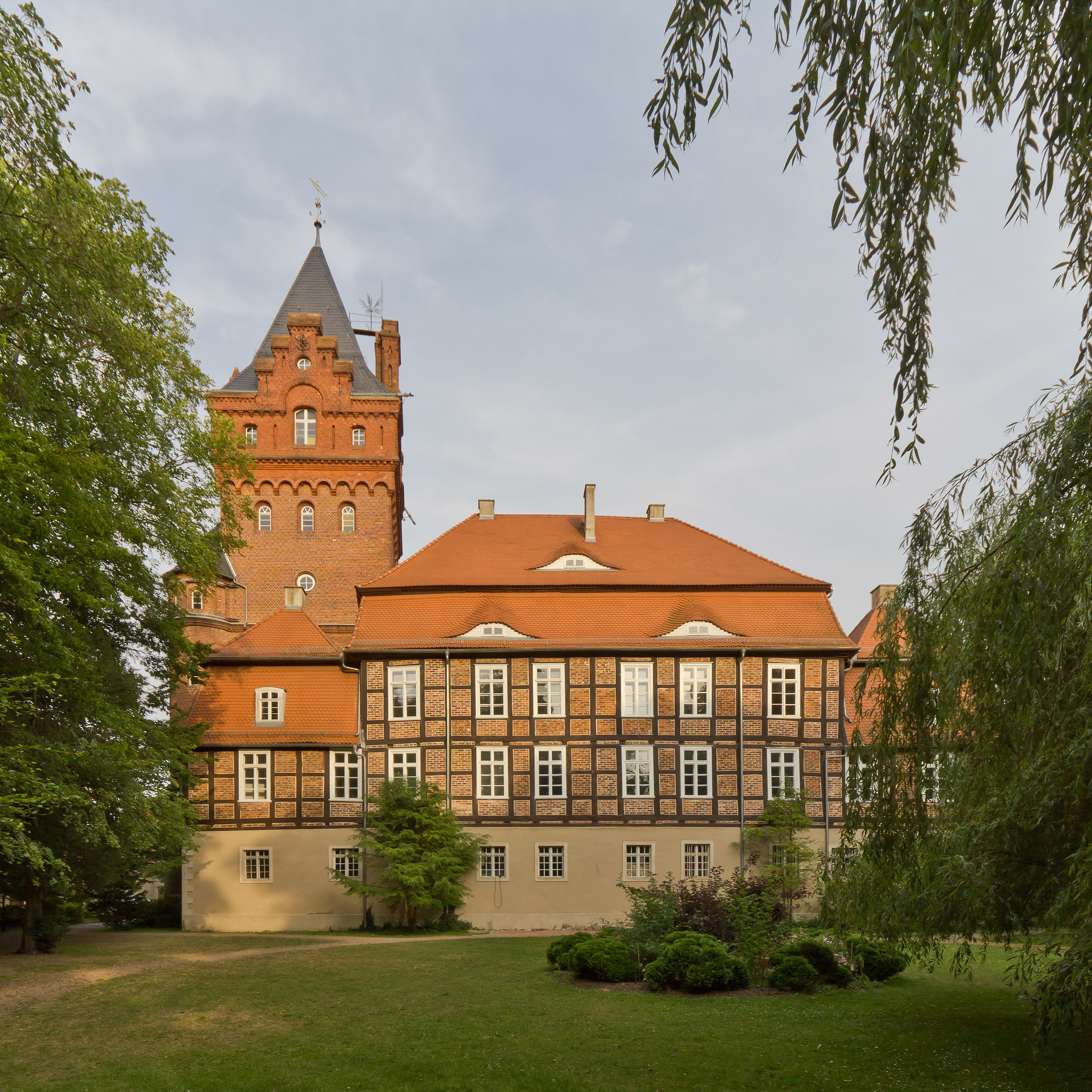
- Plattenburg Castle

- Coat of arms

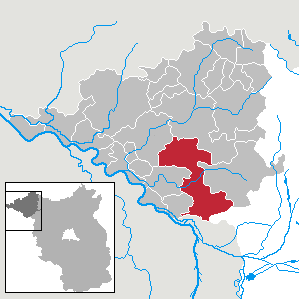
- Location of Plattenburg within Prignitz district
- Interactive map of Plattenburg
- Location within Germany Location within Brandenburg
- Coordinates: 52°58′00″N 12°01′59″E
- Country: Germany
- State: Brandenburg
- District: Prignitz

Government
  - Mayor (2020–28): Anja Kramer

Area
  - Total: 200.76 km^{2} (77.51 sq mi)
- Elevation: 32 m (105 ft)

Population (2025-12-31)
  - Total: 3,129
  - Density: 15.59/km^{2} (40.37/sq mi)
- Time zone: UTC+01:00 (CET)
  - Summer (DST): UTC+02:00 (CEST)
- Postal codes: 19336
- Dialling codes: 038796
- Vehicle registration: PR
- Website: www.plattenburg.de

Plattenburg is a municipality in the Prignitz district, in Brandenburg, Germany. It is named after the water castle of Plattenburg which is located in the district.

== Demography ==
Development of population since 1875 within the current Boundaries (Blue Line: Population; Dotted Line: Comparison to Population development in Brandenburg state; Grey Background: Time of Nazi Germany; Red Background: Time of communist East Germany)

Recent Population Development and Projections (Population Development before Census 2011 (blue line); Recent Population Development according to the Census in Germany in 2011 (blue bordered line); Official projections for 2005-2030 (yellow line); for 2017-2030 (scarlet line); for 2020-2030 (green line)

Plattenburg: Population development
within the current boundaries (2020)

Year	Pop.	±% p.a.
1875	6,113	—
1890	5,589	−0.60%
1910	5,592	+0.00%
1925	5,852	+0.30%
1939	5,384	−0.59%
1950	8,827	+4.60%
1964	6,571	−2.09%

Year	Pop.	±% p.a.
1971	6,351	−0.49%
1981	5,141	−2.09%
1985	5,265	+0.60%
1990	5,146	−0.46%
1995	4,693	−1.83%
2000	4,177	−2.30%
2005	3,977	−0.98%

Year	Pop.	±% p.a.
2010	3,712	−1.37%
2015	3,413	−1.67%
2016	3,412	−0.03%
2017	3,325	−2.55%
2018	3,297	−0.84%
2019	3,274	−0.70%
2020	3,270	−0.12%
