= Bad Wilsnack =

- Town
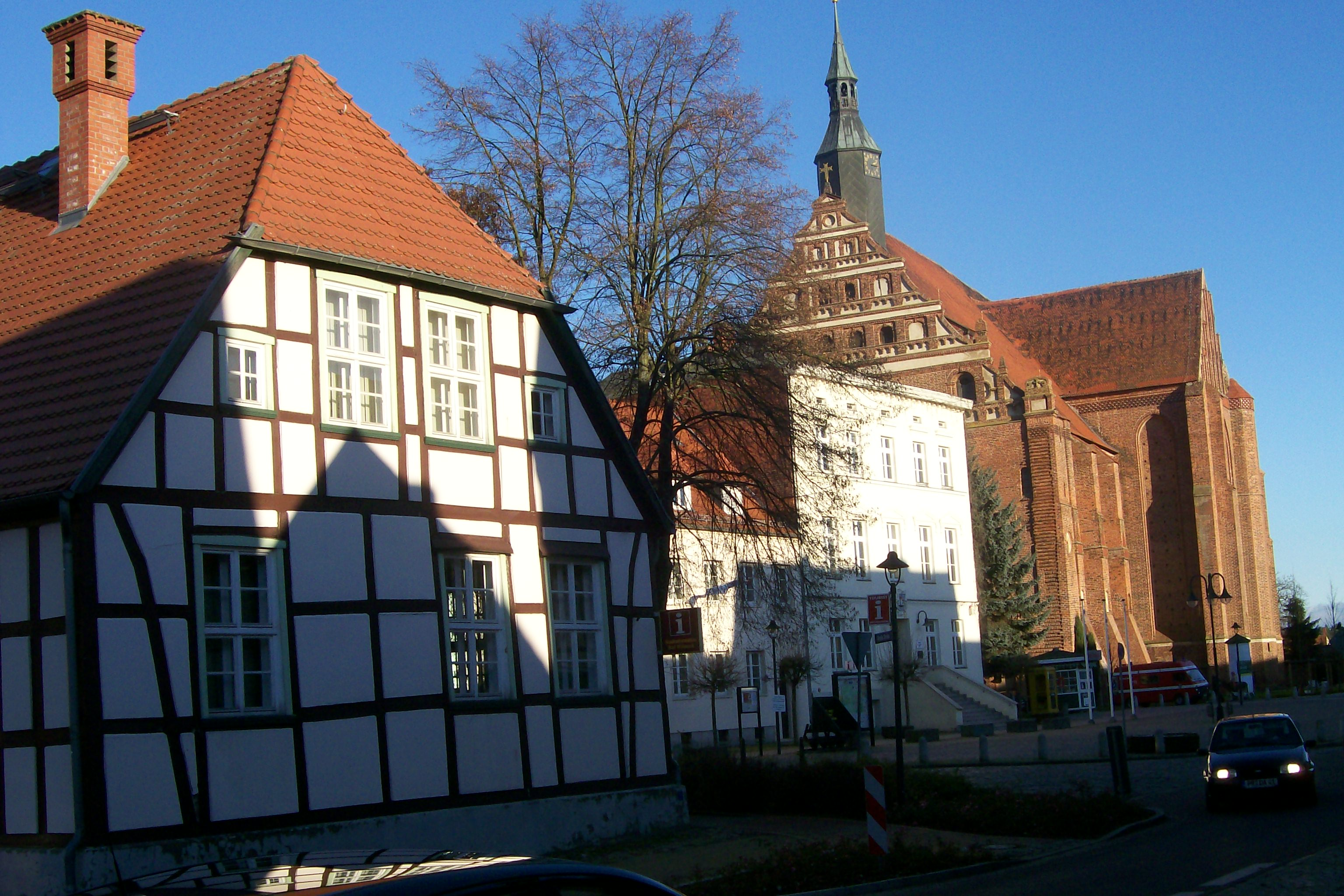
- Town hall and church

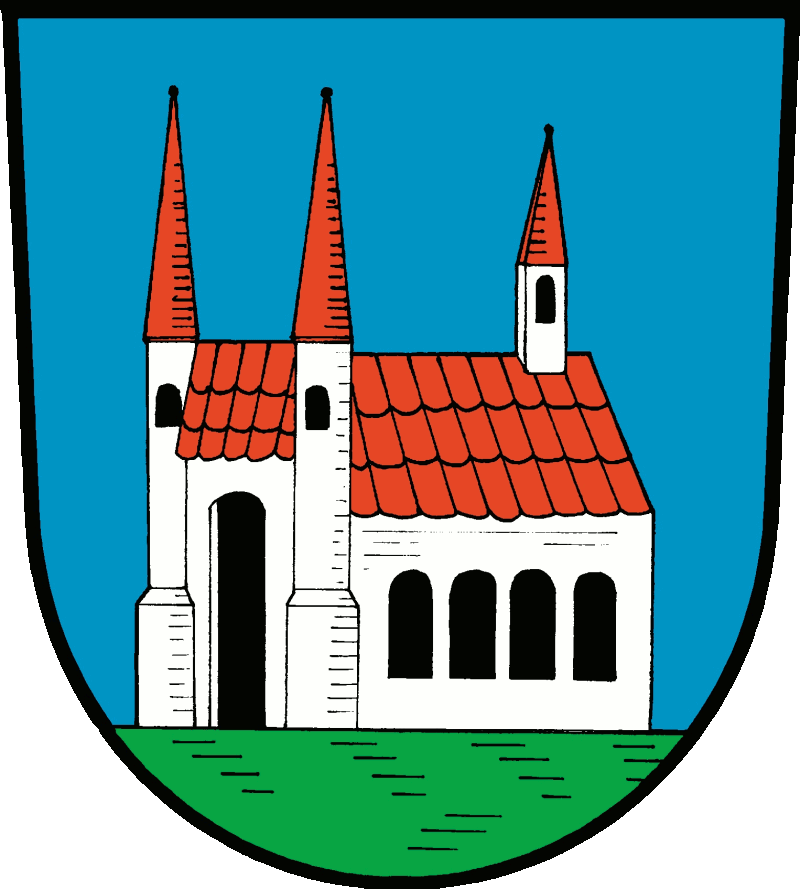
- Coat of arms

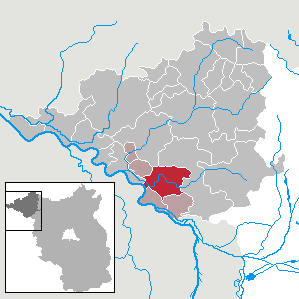
- Location of Bad Wilsnack within Prignitz district
- Interactive map of Bad Wilsnack
- Location within Germany Location within Brandenburg
- Coordinates: 52°57′00″N 11°56′59″E
- Country: Germany
- State: Brandenburg
- District: Prignitz
- Municipal assoc.: Bad Wilsnack/Weisen
- Subdivisions: 8 Stadtteile

Government
  - Mayor (2024–29): Martina Richter

Area
  - Total: 79.62 km^{2} (30.74 sq mi)
- Elevation: 27 m (89 ft)

Population (2025-12-31)
  - Total: 2,467
  - Density: 30.98/km^{2} (80.25/sq mi)
- Time zone: UTC+01:00 (CET)
  - Summer (DST): UTC+02:00 (CEST)
- Postal codes: 19336
- Dialling codes: 038791
- Vehicle registration: PR
- Website: www.bad-wilsnack.de

Bad Wilsnack (German pronunciation: [baːt ˈvɪlsnak]; until 1929 Wilsnack) is a small town in the Prignitz district, in Brandenburg, Germany. The former pilgrimage site of the Holy Blood of Wilsnack has been officially recognised as a spa town (Bad) since 1929. It is the administrative seat of the Amt ("collective municipality") Bad Wilsnack/Weisen.

== Geography ==
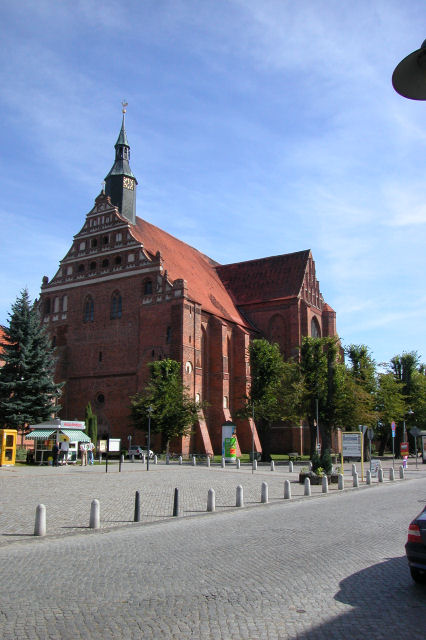
St Nicholas Church

The town is situated within the Prignitz historical region in the northwest of Brandenburg, roughly halfway between Berlin and Hamburg. It is located on the Karthane river, which flows into the Elbe at nearby Wittenberge. A few kilometers to the south is the confluence of the Havel and Elbe rivers. The neighbouring municipality of Rühstädt is famous for its high number of resident white storks.

Bad Wilsnack station is a stop on the Berlin–Hamburg Railway. The townscape is marked by the large St Nicholas Church of the Holy Blood and several timber framed houses.

== History ==
Wilsnack in the Margraviate of Brandenburg was first mentioned in 1384. The town became a pilgrimage destination after being burned down on 15 August 1383 during a raid by the Mecklenburg captain and robber baron Heinrich von Bülow against the Bishopric of Havelberg. It was believed that after the fire some hosts were found to have survived, but had the appearance of being bloodied. The Holy Blood of Wilsnack was authenticated when the Havelberg bishop Dietrich Man went to consecrate the hosts as a precaution, and the central one overflowed with blood, according to later accounts. Reformers like Jan Hus and Nicholas of Cusa later discouraged pilgrimage to Wilsnack, questioning the nature of these wonder hosts and suspecting fraud.

The pilgrimage led from St. Mary's Church in Berlin to Wilsnack. Numerous pilgrims, among them Elector Frederick II of Brandenburg went to the rebuilt town to see the miraculous hosts; their revenues enabled the citizens to construct the large St Nicholas Church for their worship, a larger building than otherwise needed in the parish. The pilgrims who went to Wilsnack bought pewter trinkets to indicate that they had reached the site. These emblems were often in the form of three hosts connected together. Seen in numerous medieval paintings, the tokens have turned up in archaeological digs from the area. The numbers of pilgrims were said to rival those to Santiago de Compostela in Spain. Despite controversy, the pilgrimages continued until 1552, when the hosts were destroyed during the Protestant Reformation.

The story of the bleeding hosts was depicted in a series of woodcuts made during the Middle Ages. The town used the image on emergency money which it printed and issued during the hyperinflation crisis of the 1920s (Notgeld).

== Demography ==
Development of Population since 1875 within the Current Boundaries (Blue Line: Population; Dotted Line: Comparison to Population Development of Brandenburg state; Grey Background: Time of Nazi rule; Red Background: Time of Communist rule)

Bad Wilsnack: Population development
within the current boundaries (2013)

Year	Pop.	±% p.a.
1875	3,496	—
1890	3,445	−0.10%
1910	3,375	−0.10%
1925	3,659	+0.54%
1933	3,518	−0.49%
1939	3,469	−0.23%
1946	5,661	+7.25%
1950	4,955	−3.28%
1964	4,055	−1.42%
1971	3,950	−0.37%
1981	3,494	−1.22%
1985	3,421	−0.53%
1989	3,243	−1.33%
1990	3,136	−3.30%
1991	3,082	−1.72%
1992	3,025	−1.85%
1993	2,948	−2.55%
1994	2,900	−1.63%
1995	2,871	−1.00%
1996	2,855	−0.56%

Year	Pop.	±% p.a.
1997	2,926	+2.49%
1998	3,055	+4.41%
1999	3,130	+2.45%
2000	3,085	−1.44%
2001	3,039	−1.49%
2002	2,982	−1.88%
2003	2,962	−0.67%
2004	2,923	−1.32%
2005	2,837	−2.94%
2006	2,803	−1.20%
2007	2,740	−2.25%
2008	2,702	−1.39%
2009	2,671	−1.15%
2010	2,635	−1.35%
2011	2,637	+0.08%
2012	2,612	−0.95%
2013	2,611	−0.04%
2014	2,590	−0.80%
2015	2,558	−1.24%
2016	2,577	+0.74%

== Local council ==
Elections were held in 2014:

- 6 seats: FDP
- 5 seats: CDU
- 2 seats: SPD
- 1 seat: Unabhängige Wählergemeinschaft Grube

== Sons and daughters of the town ==
- Wilhelm Harnisch (1787-1864), theologian and educator
- Otto Reincke (1830-1906), jurist, (Reichsgerichtsrat)
- Christoph Lütgert (born 1945), journalist and author

== Individuals connected to the city ==
- Karl Saur (c.1901 -1978), engineer and former mayor of Bad Wilsnack
- Hugo Spieler (1854-1922), sculptor
