= Hagenow Stadt station =

Railway station in Germany

Hagenow Stadt
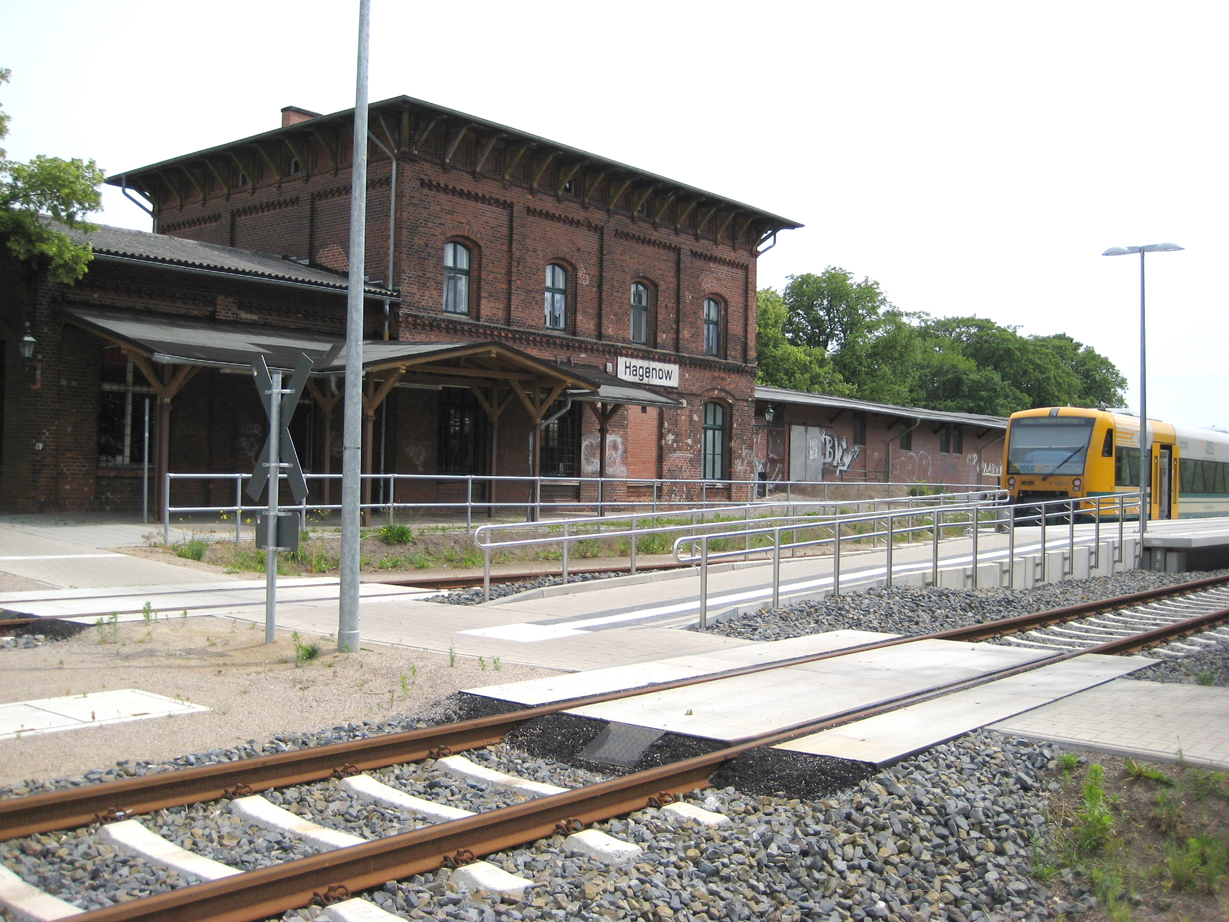
- Station building, west side

General information
- Location: Hagenow, Mecklenburg-Vorpommern; Germany
- Coordinates: 53°25′46″N 11°11′07″E
- System: Terminal station
- Line: Hagenow Land–Bad Oldesloe (3.6 km)
- Platforms: 2

Other information
- Station code: n/a
- DS100 code: WHL

History
- Opened: 1 September 1894; 131 years ago

Services
Preceding station	Ostdeutsche Eisenbahn	Following station
Terminus	RB 14	Hagenow Land towards Parchim
Location
- Location within Mecklenburg-Vorpommern Location within Germany Location within Europe

Hagenow Stadt station is a station the German state of Mecklenburg-Vorpommern on the Hagenow Land–Bad Oldesloe railway, which is now largely disused or dismantled to the northwest of the station. It is located in the centre of Hagenow and was built in 1894 with the name of Hagenow, but it has been listed in the official timetables as Hagenow Stadt (town) since 2010. It consists of a small entrance building with catering facilities and, attached on its southern side, there is a long shed that used to serve freight operations. The main platform and another island platform are located on the two-track line. The entrance building is on the side of the line that faces towards the centre of town. Between Hagenow Stadt station and the point where the line towards Hagenow Land station becomes a single track, the tracks spread at two locations with four or five parallel sidings at each place, but they are no longer used. The entrance building and the freight terminal buildings are heritage-listed monuments.

Regular passenger services, however, have only operated on the three and a half km section between Hagenow Land and Hagenow Stadt since the reactivation of the line in 2002. Currently, Hagenow Stadt station is served every two hours by the R14 service from Parchim and Ludwigslust, which is operated by Ostdeutsche Eisenbahn GmbH (ODEG).

Line	Route
R 14	Hagenow Stadt – Hagenow Land – Ludwigslust – Parchim
