= Karstädt station =

Railway station in Karstädt, Germany

Karstädt
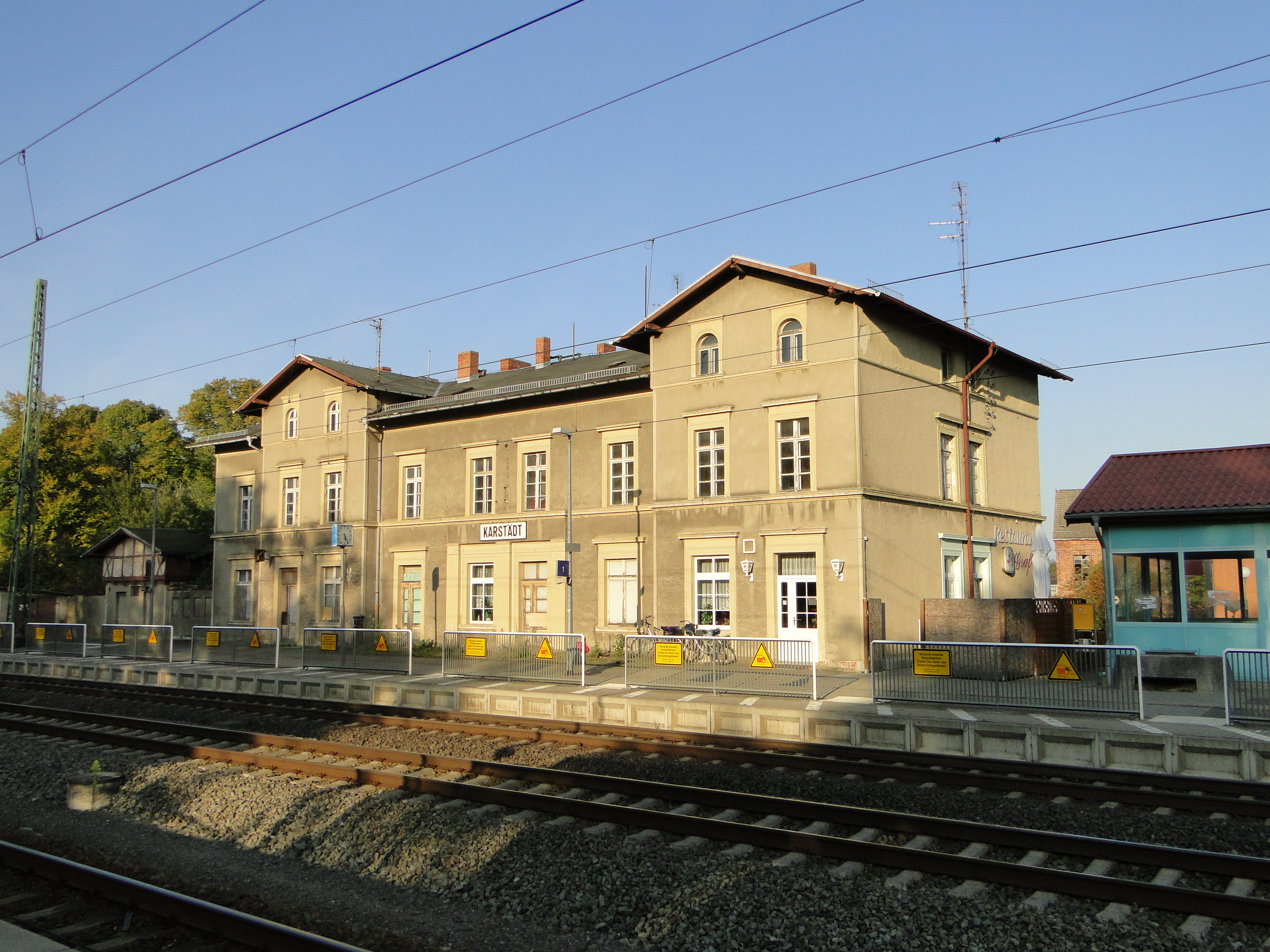

General information
- Location: Bahnhofstr. 5, Karstädt, Brandenburg; Germany
- Coordinates: 53°09′39″N 11°44′20″E
- Lines: Berlin–Hamburg (144.5 km); Westprignitz District Ring Railway
- Platforms: 2, formerly 3

Construction
- Accessible: Yes

Other information
- Station code: 3118
- DS100 code: WKT
- IBNR: 8011994
- Category: 6
- Fare zone: VBB: 4030
- Website: www.bahnhof.de

History
- Opened: 1 November 1853; 172 years ago (freight); 1859 (passengers)
- Electrified: 30 May 1987; 39 years ago, 15 kV 16 2/3 Hz AC system (overhead)

Services
Preceding station	Ostdeutsche Eisenbahn	Following station
Grabow (Meckl) towards Wismar	RE 8	Wittenberge towards Elsterwerda
Location
- Location within Brandenburg

Karstädt station is the station of Karstädt in the German state of Brandenburg. It lies on the Berlin–Hamburg Railway and was opened for freight in 1853 and for passengers in 1859. The Karstädt station of the former Westprignitz District Ring Railway (German: Westprignitzer Kreisringbahn) was nearby and was served by passenger services from 1911 to 1975 and by freight traffic until the beginning of the 1990s. The state station's Neoclassical entrance building along with a second building, its goods shed and the paving of the forecourt have heritage protection.

== Location ==
The station is located at kilometre 144.3 of the Berlin–Hamburg railway and west of the centre of Karstädt. The railway runs in this area in a roughly north-south direction and, in the station area, crossed the old route of federal highway 5, which now runs on a bypass of the town to the south. About 15 kilometres to the south-east is the district seat of Perleberg and just 20 km to the south is the railway junction of Wittenberge. The route of the Westprignitz District Ring Railway from Perleberg to Karstädt reached the town from the east and ran for a short distance parallel to the main line in the town and then continued to the northeast.

== History ==
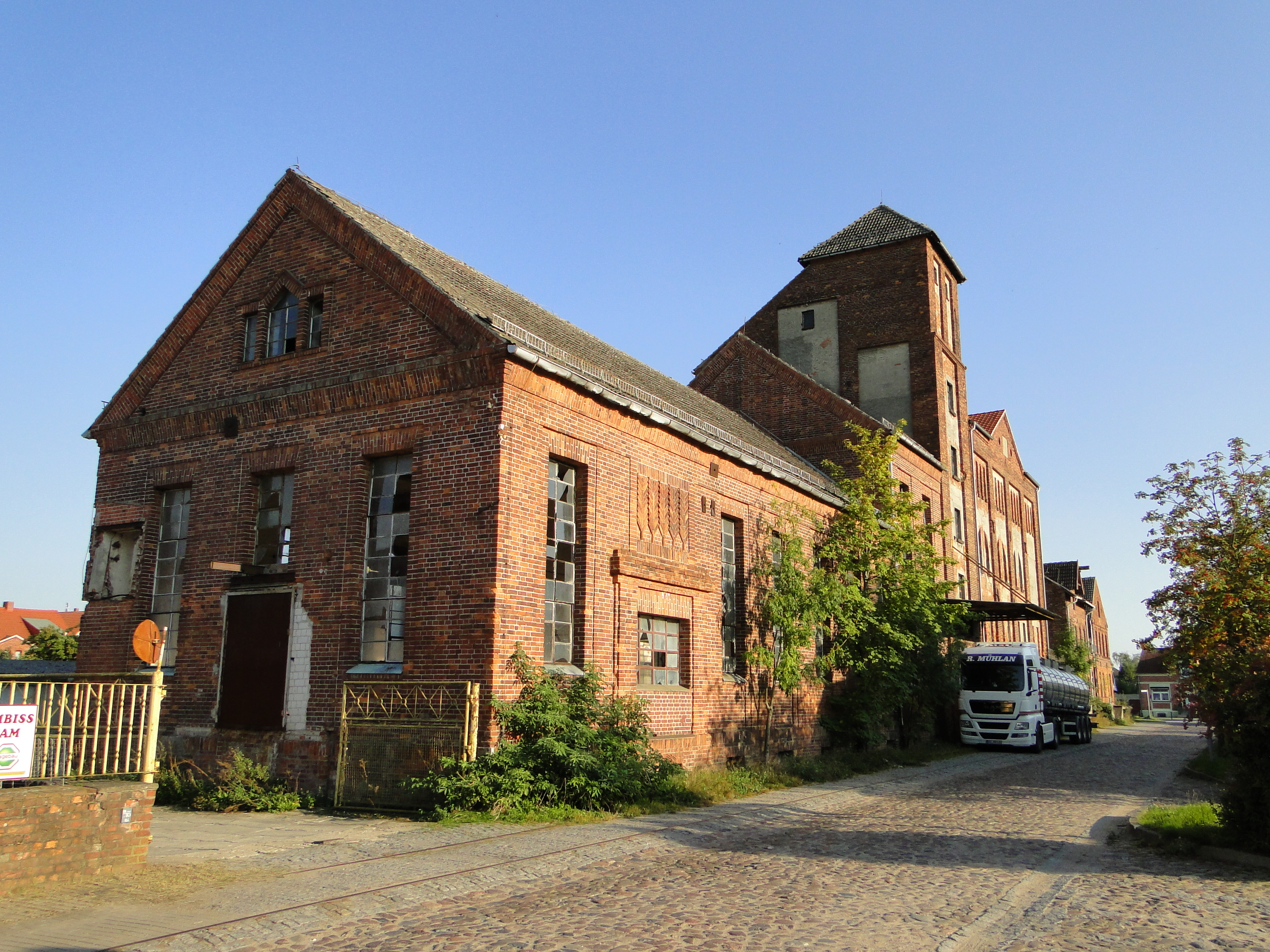
Remains of the tracks of the Westprignitz District Ring Railway in the station forecourt. The paving and the building of the former dairy (left) have heritage protection.

The Berlin–Hamburg railway between Berlin and Boizenburg was opened on 15 October 1846. During the first years of operation on the line, Klein Warnow station was the only station on the line between Wittenberge and Grabow. This now closed station served as the border station on the border of Prussia and Mecklenburg-Schwerin.

Karstädt station first went in operation for freight transport on 1 November 1853. The Gühlitz-Warnow Company (Gühlitz-Warnower-Aktiengesellschaft) used the station to transport lignite mined near Gühlitz and taken by road to Karstädt. Passenger services commenced at the station in 1859 with the completion of the entrance building. They did not appear in the timetable of 1855.

Five pairs of passenger trains stopped at the station in 1880. The Westprignitz District Ring Railway was opened in 1911 and had its station on the forecourt of the station of the state railway.

An approximately twenty km-long section of the line around Karstädt, which is almost straight, was used in the late 1920s for high-speed tests. In 1931, the Schienenzeppelin of Franz Kruckenberg reached a world speed record of 230 km/h in Karstädt, which it held for 24 years.

Passenger traffic volumes remained moderate. In the 1930s, six pairs of passenger trains a day served the station, four of which ran to Berlin, the other two only as far as Wittenberge.

Passenger services on the Westprignitz District Ring Railway were abandoned in 1975. Most of the line was abandoned, but freight continued to operate on the section from Karstädt to Perleberg until the early 1990s and it was used for occasional excursions. Likewise, the section from Karstädt to Margarethenthal near Dallmin remained open to connect with a local starch factory until after 1990.

The connection from Magdeburg to Schwerin, including the line through Karstädt station, was electrified in 1986/87. In the second half of the 1980s, Karstädt was served by a few Durchgangszug (express) services. Twice a week an express train ran from Schwerin to Berlin and back and stopped at the station. Otherwise, passenger services were limited for decades to four pairs of trains a day.

In the mid-1990s, services were extended and the timetable provided regular-interval services. Local trains running between Wittenberge and Schwerin serve Karstädt every two hours.

In the 1990s, the station was rebuilt and provided with platforms on the outsides of the tracks. In a second stage, the line was upgraded to a maximum speed of 230 km/h and all level crossings were removed and replaced by overpasses or underpasses. The crossing of the former federal highway in the station area was completely closed, but cyclists and pedestrians can use the platform tunnel.

Today (2026) Karstädt Station is served by RE 8 every two hours: Wismar – Schwerin – Ludwigslust – Karstädt – Berlin – Potsdamer Platz – Südkreuz –Wünsdorf-Waldstadt – Elsterwerda

=== Station and environment ===
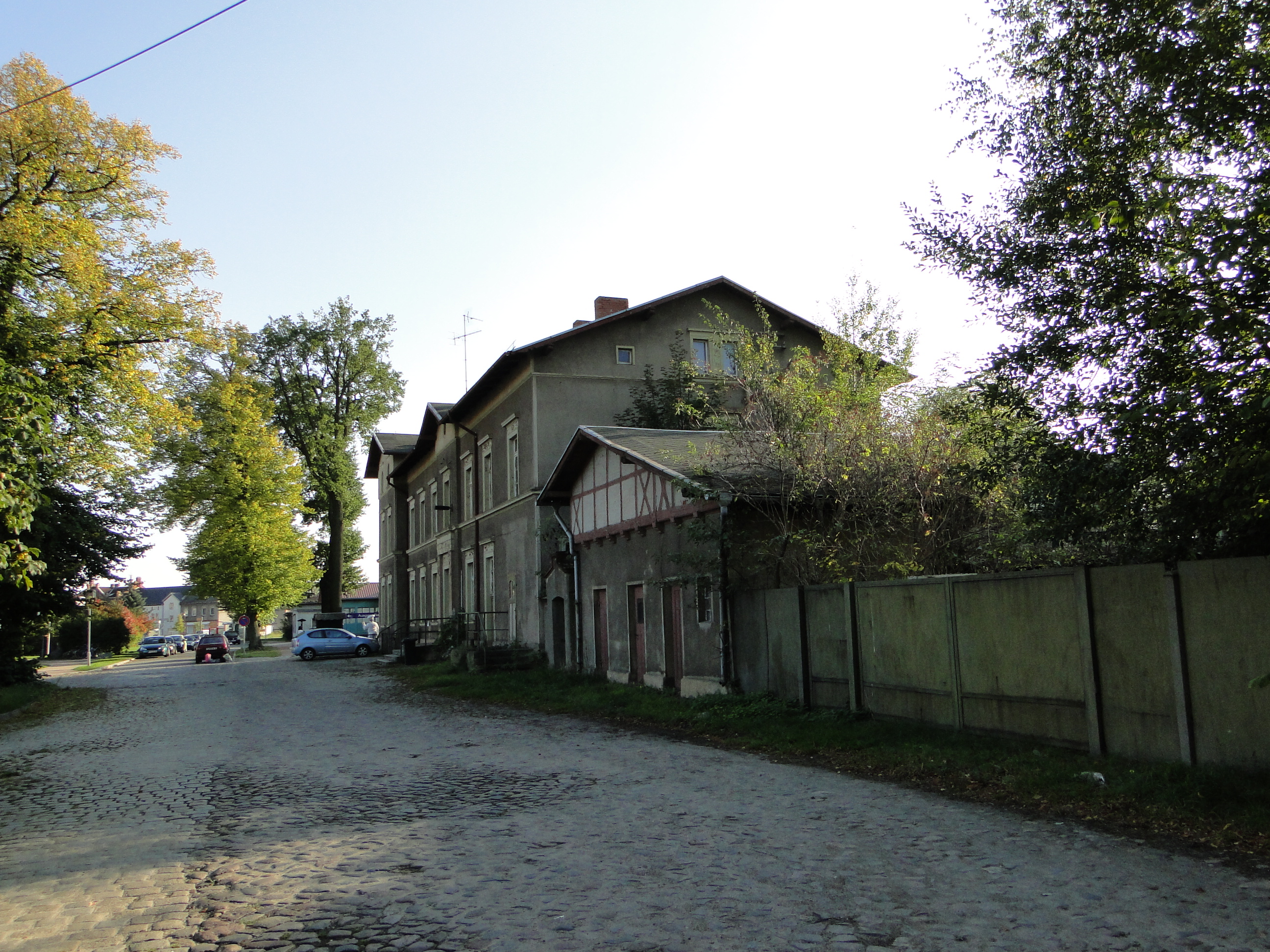
Station from the street side: entrance building, additional building and pavement are heritage-listed.

The station building is on the east side of the tracks towards the town. It originally had four portals on its long side with a gabled roof and a central avant-corps with two portals on the platform side. It was similar to the station buildings that had been built earlier on the Berlin–Hamburg railway, such as those in Grabow and Bergedorf, although they were built with five portals from the beginning. The avant-corps on the town side was only hinted at. The building was expanded considerably in 1877/78. Another five portals were built to the south and the southern two also were part of an avant-corps, so that the building appears from the track side to be approximately symmetrical.

Adjoining the station building to the north, there is a small outbuilding with a half-timbered facade in its roof area. Because this building was already shown on a map dating from around 1860, it is believed that it is one of the oldest parts of the station and possibly dates back to the time before the construction of the entrance building. Still further north is the former goods shed. Next to the station building to the south there was a separate toilet block built out of brick in a "romantic style". It was demolished to make room for an extension to the platform tunnel during the renovation of the station.

In the early 2000s, the building was one of the few station buildings that had survived from the early years of the Berlin–Hamburg Railway that was not yet a heritage-listed building. Since then, the ensemble of the station, "consisting of the main station buildings, the outbuilding, the goods shed and the paving", have been given heritage protection. After the building had long stood empty for the most part, the last remaining tenant, a restaurant, left the station in early 2013.

=== Other infrastructure ===
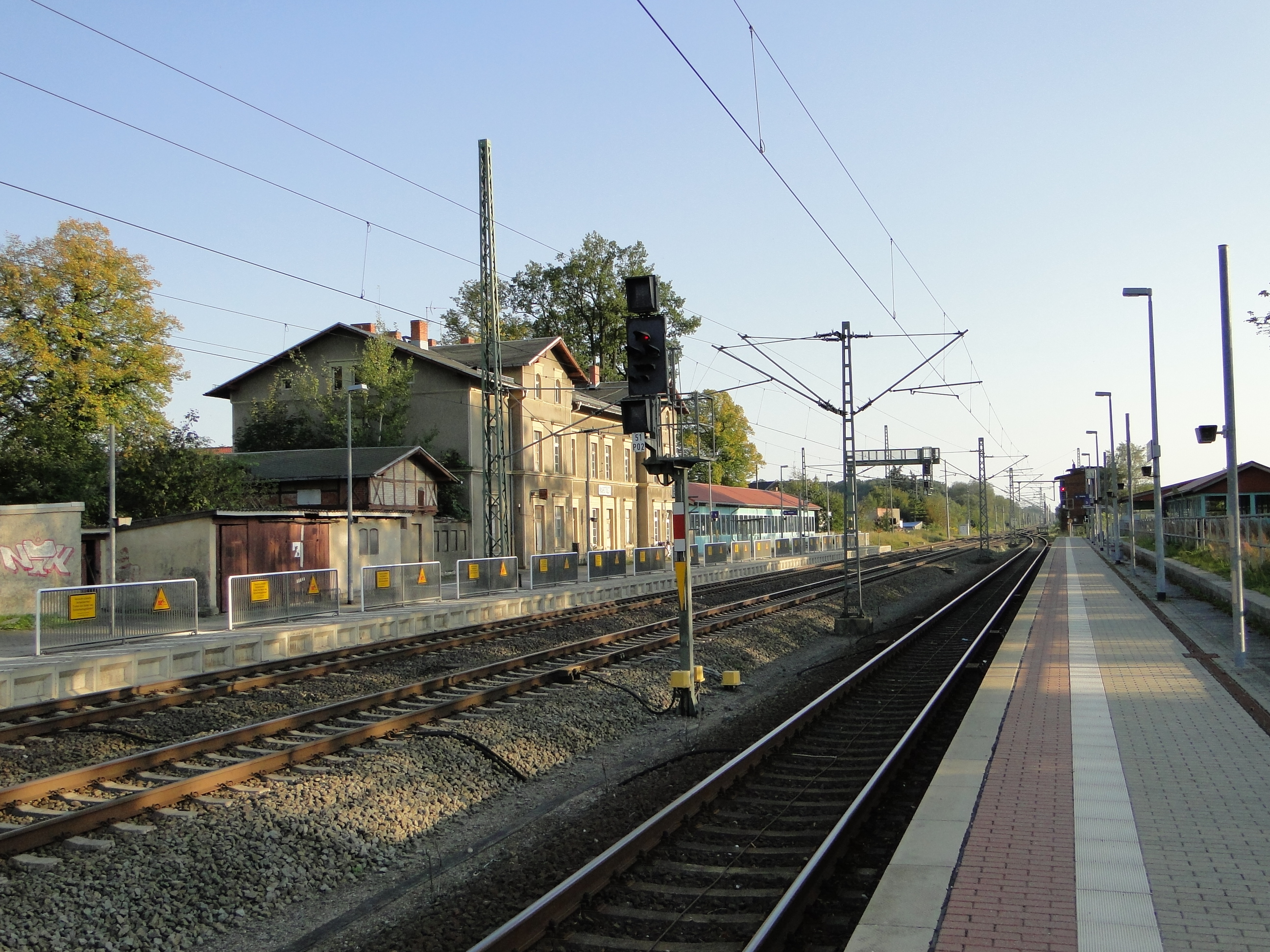
Platforms with station building and access to the underpass.

Originally there was a platform next to the station building on the main track to the north and this platform was accessible via points from the track running in the opposite direction. West of the through tracks there were freight tracks and more freight sidings joined on the eastern side of the station north of the entrance building. In this area was the transfer track to the Westprignitz District Ring Railway. Its platform was in the forecourt of the state station and north of it there were facilities for freight transport.

Since its renovation, the station has three through tracks. The main platform is located on the main track running to the north. The outside platform for trains running to the south is on a fast track and in between there is a track without a platform for through trains. Both platforms are connected by an underpass with ramps.

For freight traffic there is still a siding connection to the brick works on the northwest side of the railway tracks and a connection to a grain business on the northeast side is still served. Other connections formerly led to a dairy and a cereals factory east and northeast of the station.
