= Hagenow Land–Bad Oldesloe railway =

Railway line in northern Germany

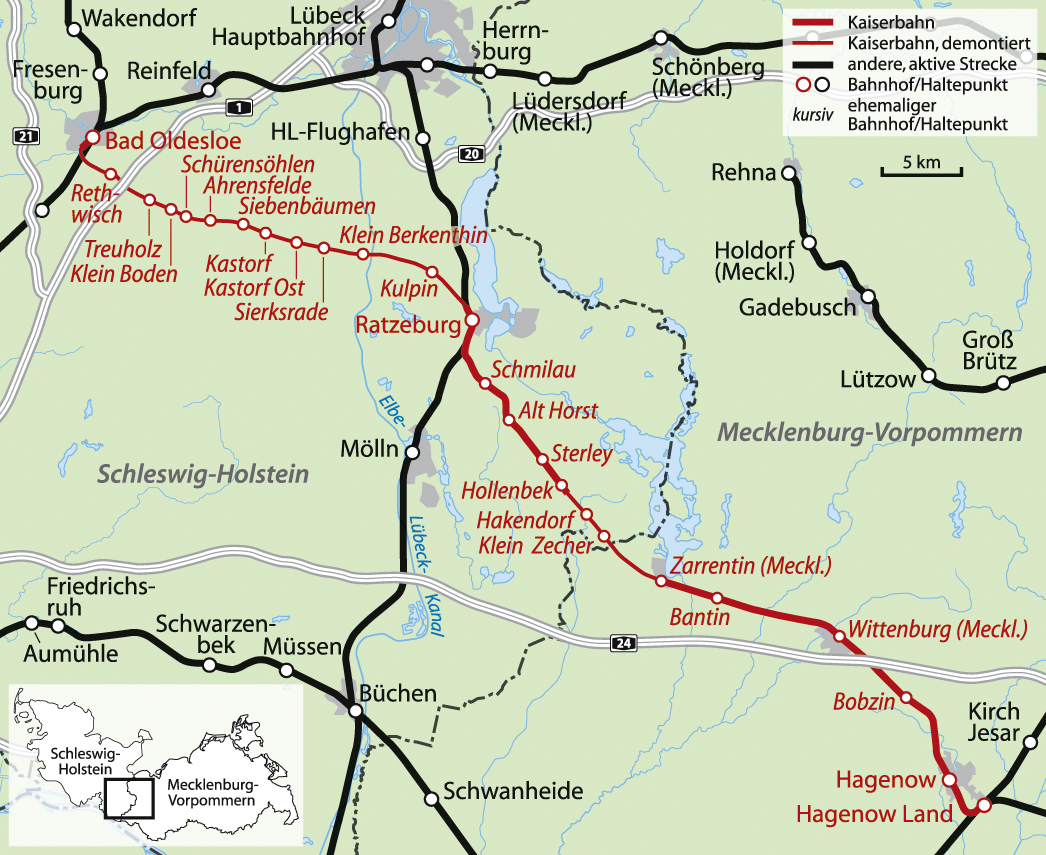

Overview
- Line number: 6928
- Locale: Mecklenburg-Vorpommern and Schleswig-Holstein, Germany

Service
- Route number: 172

Technical
- Line length: 78.3 km (48.7 mi)
- Track gauge: 1,435 mm (4 ft 8 1/2 in) standard gauge

The Hagenow Land–Bad Oldesloe railway (also known in German as the Kaiserbahn or Kaiserstrecke—"Emperor Railway") was a railway line in the states of Mecklenburg-Vorpommern and Schleswig-Holstein. It linked the towns of Hagenow, Ratzeburg and Bad Oldesloe with each other and formed with lines continuing via Bad Segeberg and Neumünster the shortest rail link between Berlin and Kiel, the difference with the other two routes is about 55 kilometres in each case. Today, only the short section between the stations of Hagenow Land and Hagenow Stadt (called just Hagenow until 2010) is regularly served by passenger services, although the Hollenbek–Ratzeburg section is used for draisine rides. The Hagenow–Zarrentin section is served occasionally. The other sections are closed and dismantled. Its alternative name Kaiserbahn refers to Emperor Wilhelm II, who often used it.

== History ==
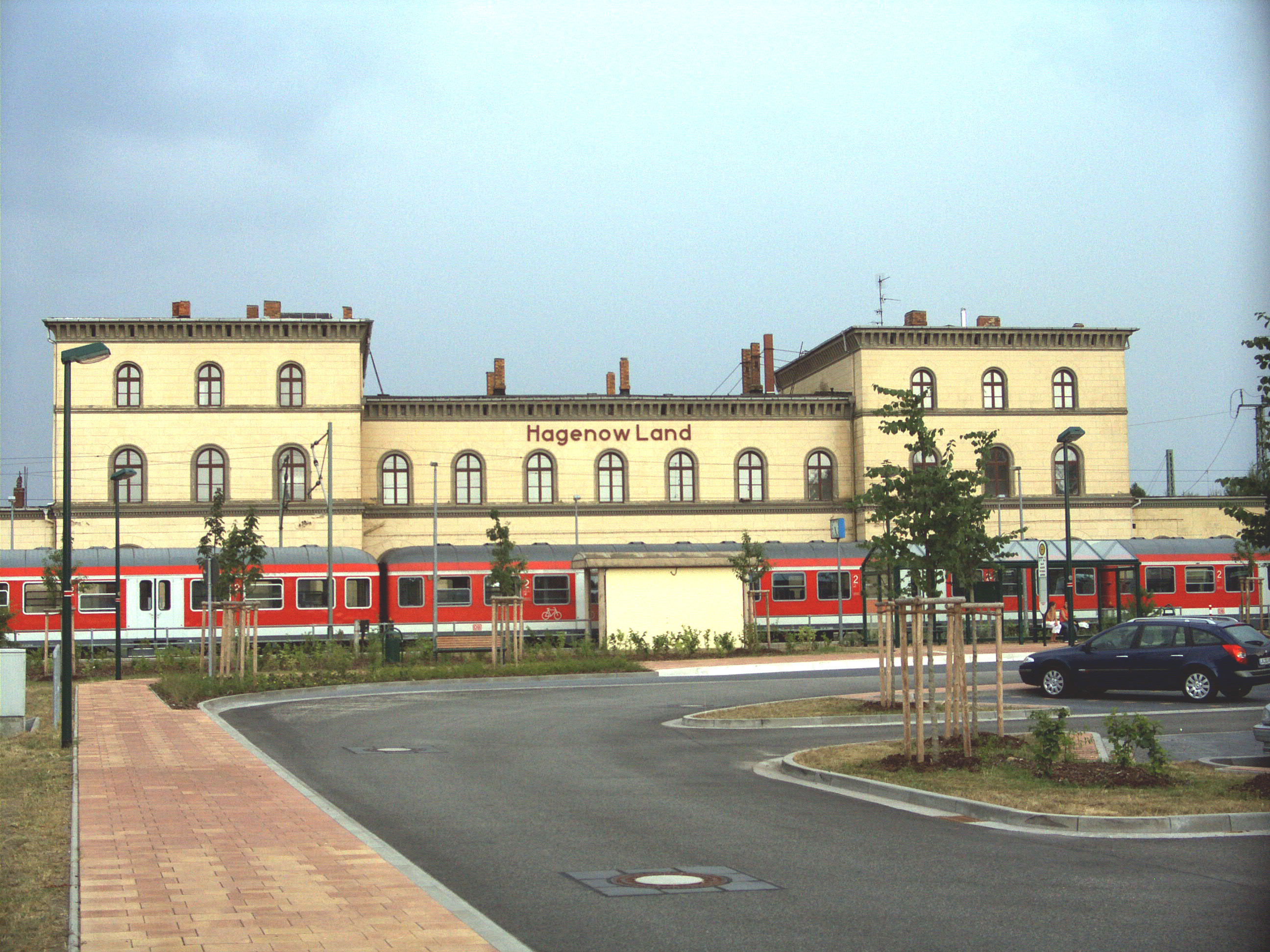
Hagenow Land – starting point of the line

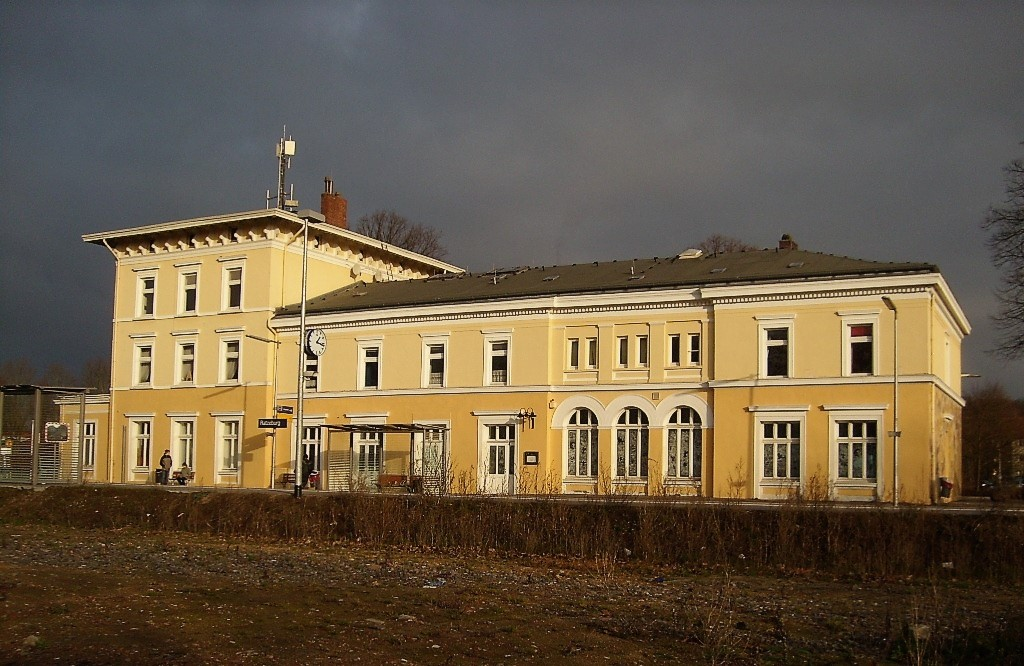
Ratzeburg

Before the construction of the line there were already two rail connections between Berlin and Kiel: the southern route ran via Büchen and Hamburg on the Berlin–Hamburg Railway and the northern route ran via Schwerin–Bad Kleinen and the Lübeck–Bad Kleinen lines. However, both lines diverged greatly from a straight line. At the request of the Emperor, a new route was designed, to run in the area "in between" and bypass the railway hubs of Hamburg and Lübeck. Wilhelm II used the approach that had already been used by Tsar Nicholas I for the Moscow – Saint Petersburg Railway, with a ruler giving the approximate course. The treaty authorising the construction of the railway was finally signed on 5 December 1889.

The desired course of the single-track line runs through many cuttings and an average number of fields. To compensate the latter, many bridges were built over the line for tracks that did not connect to other tracks and were used exclusively for agricultural purposes. Some of these bridges still exist today.

Crossing and passing tracks were located in the stations. Most underpasses were built to enable the later installation of a second track.

=== Prussian state railway and Reichsbahn period ===
The railway was opened in three sections by the Prussian state railways, although the eastern part lay in Mecklenburg, which was then independent:

- 1 September 1894: Hagenow Land–Wittenburg
- 1 September 1896: Wittenburg–Zarrentin
- 15 August 1897: Zarrentin–Ratzeburg–Bad Oldesloe

The operation of through traffic over the whole line began with the opening of the last section. The Emperor participated personally and used the line from the first day as it was 25 km shorter than the two alternative routes. Nevertheless, the Emperor sometimes preferred to use the northern route via Lübeck; the risk of attack on the new route was higher because of the bridge over the Elbe–Lübeck Canal.

The branch line from Hollenbek to Mölln was opened on 1 April 1899.

At the beginning of the 20th century it was served by an express train and in the 1930s two express trains ran between Berlin and Kiel and back across the southeastern part of the line between Hagenow and Ratzeburg. These trains ran between Ratzeburg and Kiel via Lübeck and thus over the line of the private Lübeck-Büchen Railway Company. The line was mainly important for local passenger services and freight traffic. In 1945, up to 60 trains a day ran on the section between Hollenbek and Schmilau.

The decline of the railway began with the end of the Second World War. In 1945, a munitions train in Hollenbek station was hit by U.S. bombers. The exploding ammunition tore a hole that was up to 12 metres deep over a 150 m by 25 m area. Rail fragments and the boiler of the locomotive were thrown up to 1 km away and as far as the centre of the village. Nevertheless, the line was reopened for rail transport after a few weeks.

A wagon was left in a tree at Hollenbek station. Erlebnisbahn Ratzeburg (a leisure company in Ratzeburg) recreated this for its Baumwaggonhotel ("Tree wagon Hotel").

=== Separate decline ===
==== The western section ====
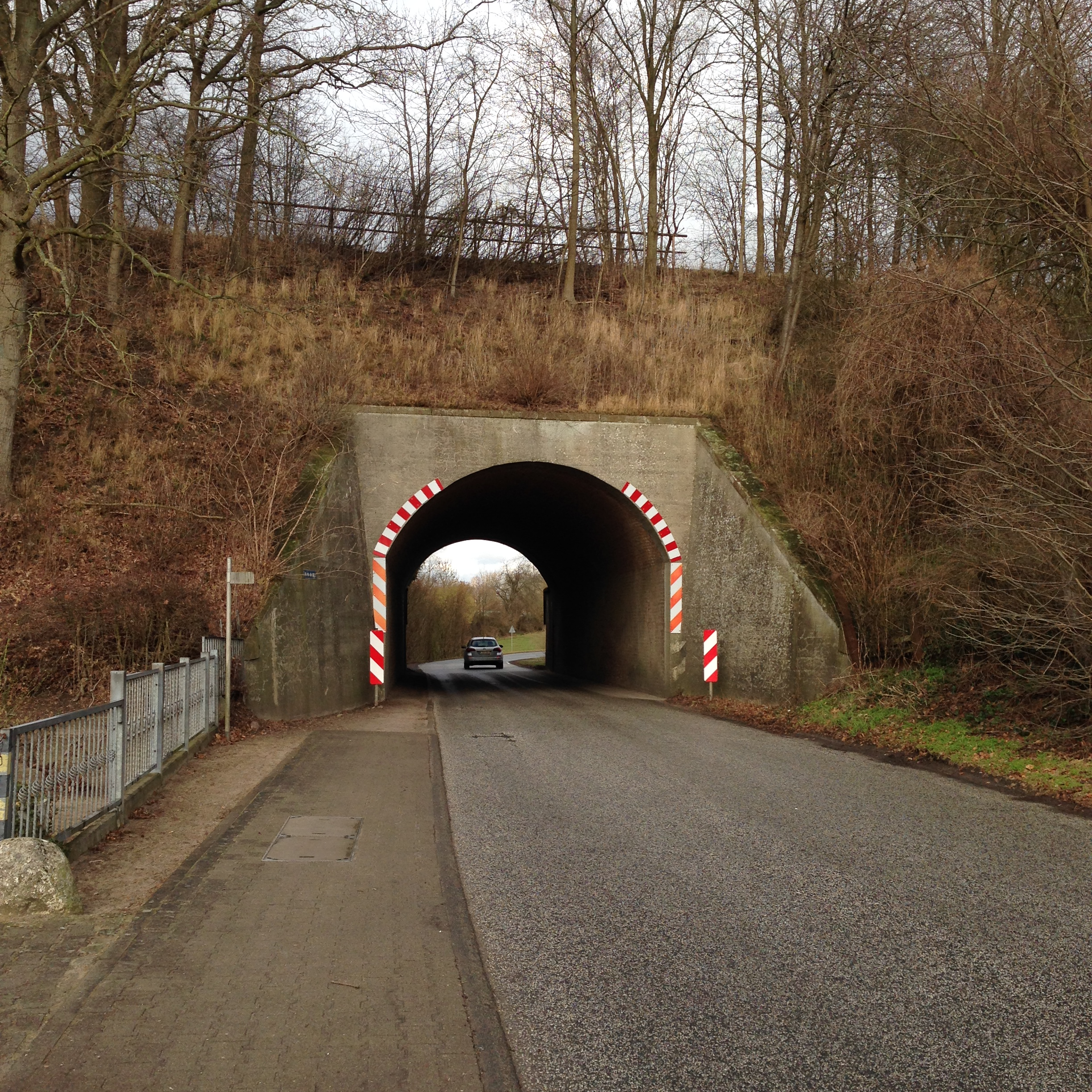
Railway bridge in Berkenthin

Immediately after the German surrender and the division of Germany into occupation zones, the Zarrentin–Hollenbek section, which was cut by the border between the UK and Soviet zones, was closed and the line at the border was dismantled in 1952. In 1949 the status of the line was downgraded to a branch line.

However, on the western side, the Hollenbek–Klein Zecher section was reactivated as early as 1950; apart from the new terminus, the stations of Hakendorf, Sterley and Alt Horst were re-opened. It was operated with railbuses. The section between Hollenbek and Mölln was closed on 3 September 1959, finally ending passenger services on the entire West German section between Klein Zecher and Bad Oldesloe.

On 1 September 1971, the transport of freight between Hollenbek and Klein Zecher and between Ratzeburg and Bad Oldesloe was abandoned; a year later was the track was dismantled on these sections. On the remaining 13 km to Ratzeburg, however, a little freight traffic remained, mainly consisting of the transport of sugar beet to Uelzen in Lower Saxony. This section continued to be operated until 14 December 1994, but it was then also closed due to its unprofitability.

==== The eastern section ====
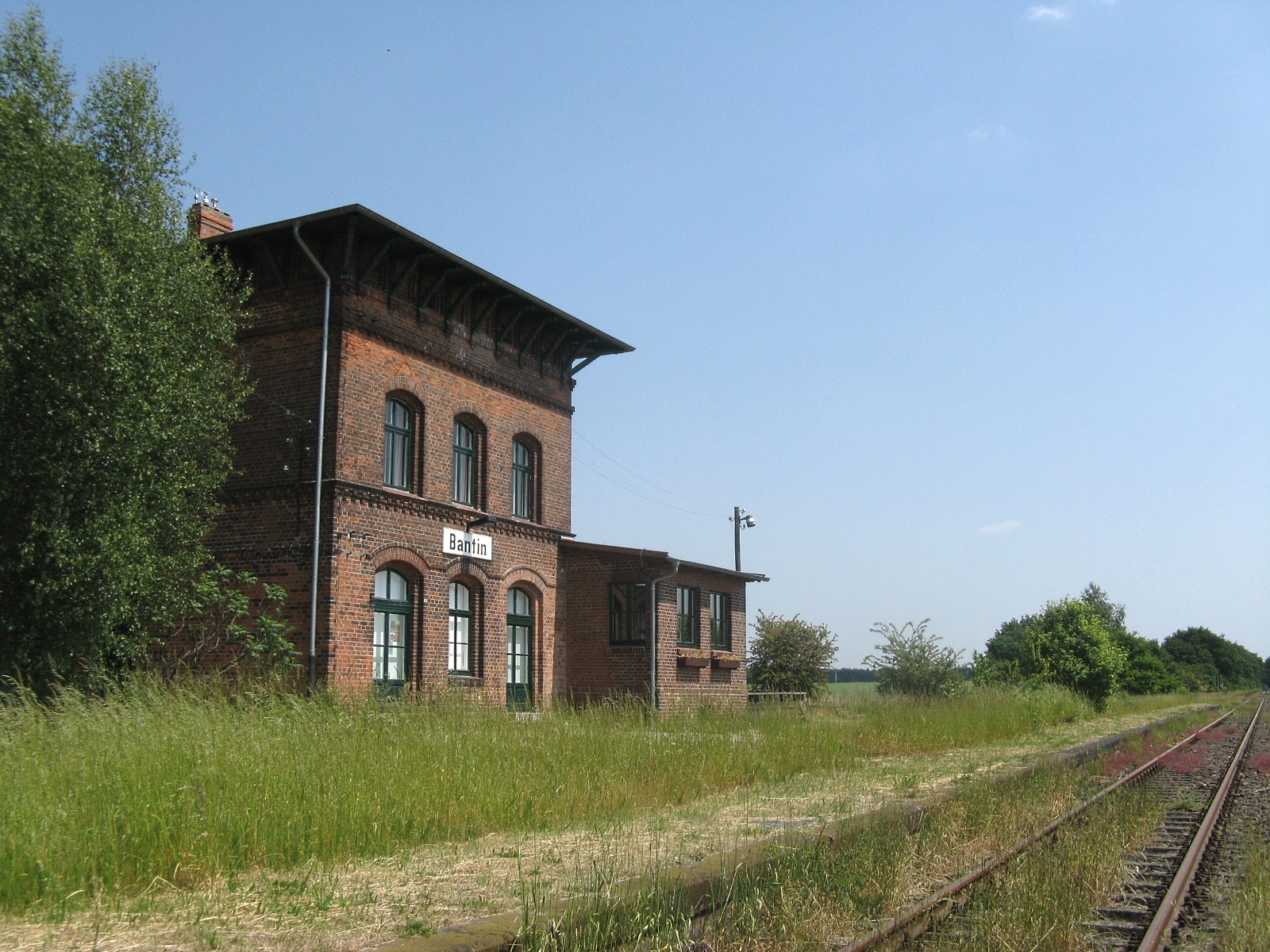
Station building in Bantin

Passenger and freight services on the Hagenow Land–Zarrentin section were maintained until 30 April 1969. The line was closed until 27 September 1975 for the rehabilitation of the track. Passenger traffic was sparse, but it was maintained until the turn of the millennium, while the carriage of freight between Zarrentin and Wittenburg was discontinued on 31 December 1994.

On 28 May 2000, passenger traffic was abandoned on the section between Hagenow Land and Zarrentin. However, freight traffic remained. As a result of a great protest, however, passenger services were reactivated between Hagenow Land and Hagenow Stadt on 15 December 2002.

The Hagenow Land–Zarrentin line was taken over in September 2004 from DB Netz by Planungsverband Transportgewerbegebiet Valluhn/Gallin, a railway infrastructure company that was based locally in Zarrentin, so that rail freight could run to the MEGA-park business park on the A24 autobahn. Operations from line km 0.766 are carried out by the TME (Torsten Meincke Eisenbahn GmbH), which also provides the staff for the signal boxes at Hagenow Stadt, Wittenburg and Zarrentin.

In the autumn of 2009, the tracks were renewed on this section and the maximum line speed increased from 60 to 80 km/h.

== Operations ==
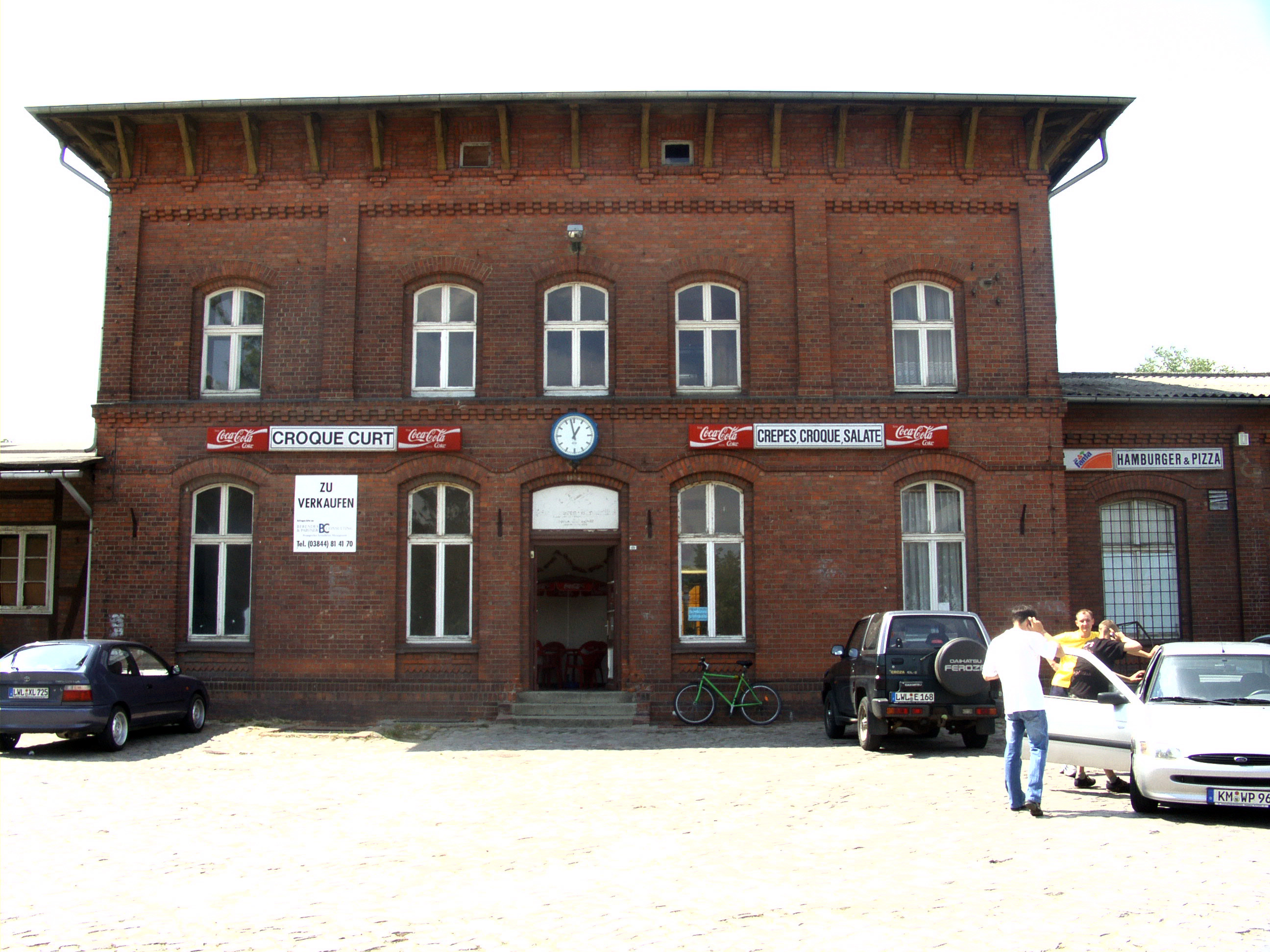
Hagenow station

There are some passenger or freight traffic on only two short sections. On the western section between Hollenbek and Ratzeburg, Erlebnisbahn Ratzeburg has operated a seasonal operation with rides on a hand lever trolley (draisine) since 1998. In addition the track is maintained to promote its re-commissioning for the operation of Regionalbahn services.

Regular passenger services, however, have only operated on the three and a half km section between Hagenow Land and Hagenow Stadt since the reactivation of the line in 2002. Currently, Hagenow Stadt station is served hourly by the R3 service, which is operated by Ostdeutsche Eisenbahn GmbH (ODEG).

Since 6 April 2008, on the first Sunday of the month in the summer, two pairs of trains are operated on the line by Westmecklenburgischen Eisenbahngesellschaft (WEMEG) between Hagenow Land and Zarrentin. These services are operated with Uerdingen railbuses. Otherwise, this line is occasionally used by trains transporting bulk materials. In addition, in the autumn of 2010, around 60 trains were loaded in Zarrentin with pipes for the North European Gas Pipeline, which had been brought from Wittenburg by truck. Cement for a large construction site on the A24 also came by train to Zarrentin in 2010.

== Initiatives ==
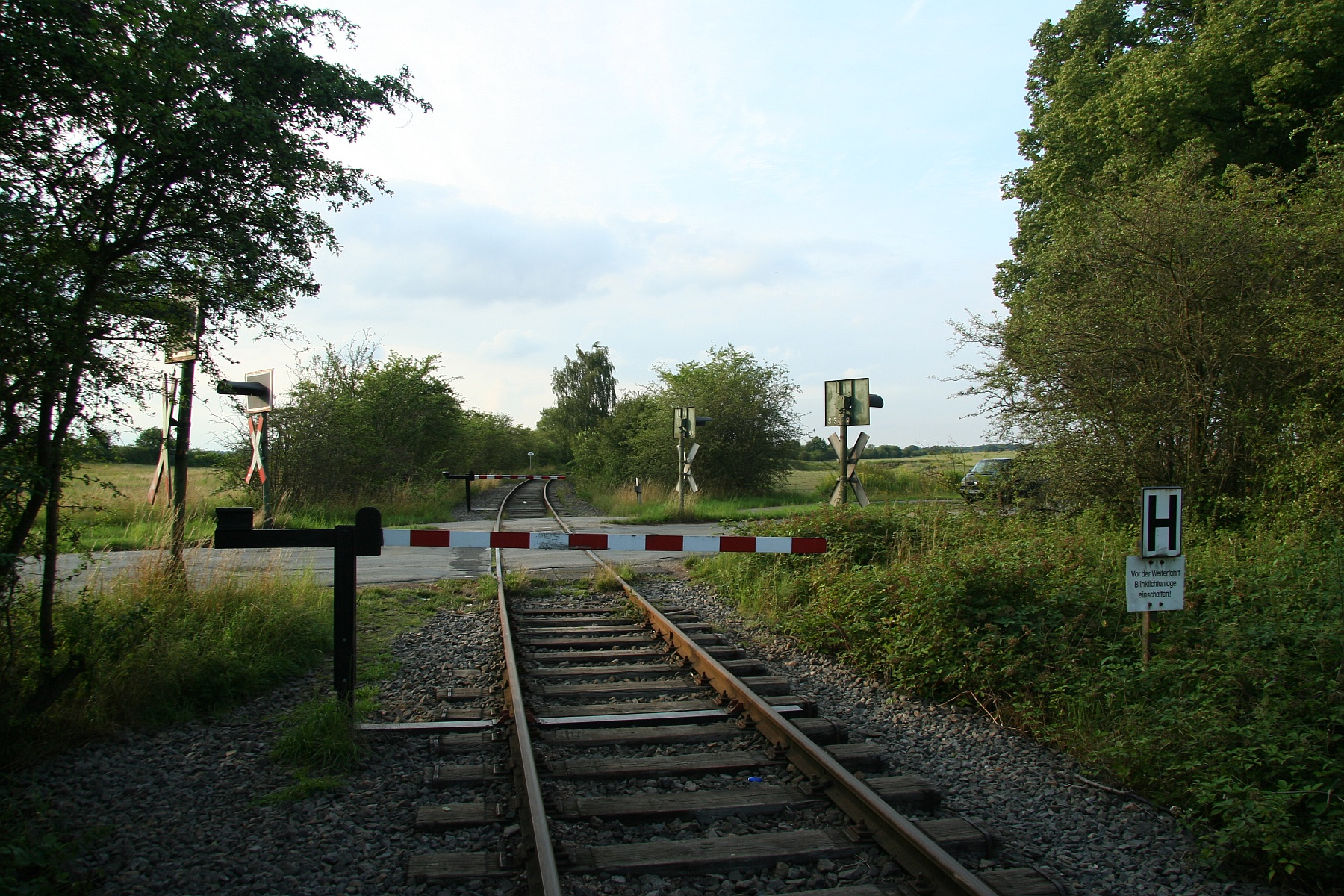
Intersection rebuilt for Draisine operations shortly before Ratzeburg

Even today, the line could be used as an alternative for traffic from Berlin to the ports of Schleswig-Holstein. In addition to being a shorter route, this would also provide relief for the Hamburg network. In particular, BUND and IG Eisenbahn Ratzeburg–Zarrentin have campaigned for the reopening of the line between Hagenow and Ratzeburg. A continuation to Bad Oldesloe is not proposed because this line has already been dismantled.

The possible reopening is justified by the fact that part of the freight would be shifted from road to rail and that a fast rail link would exist between Scandinavia and Berlin after the completion of a Fehmarn Belt Fixed Link.
