= Hagenow Land station =

Railway station in Germany

Hagenow Land
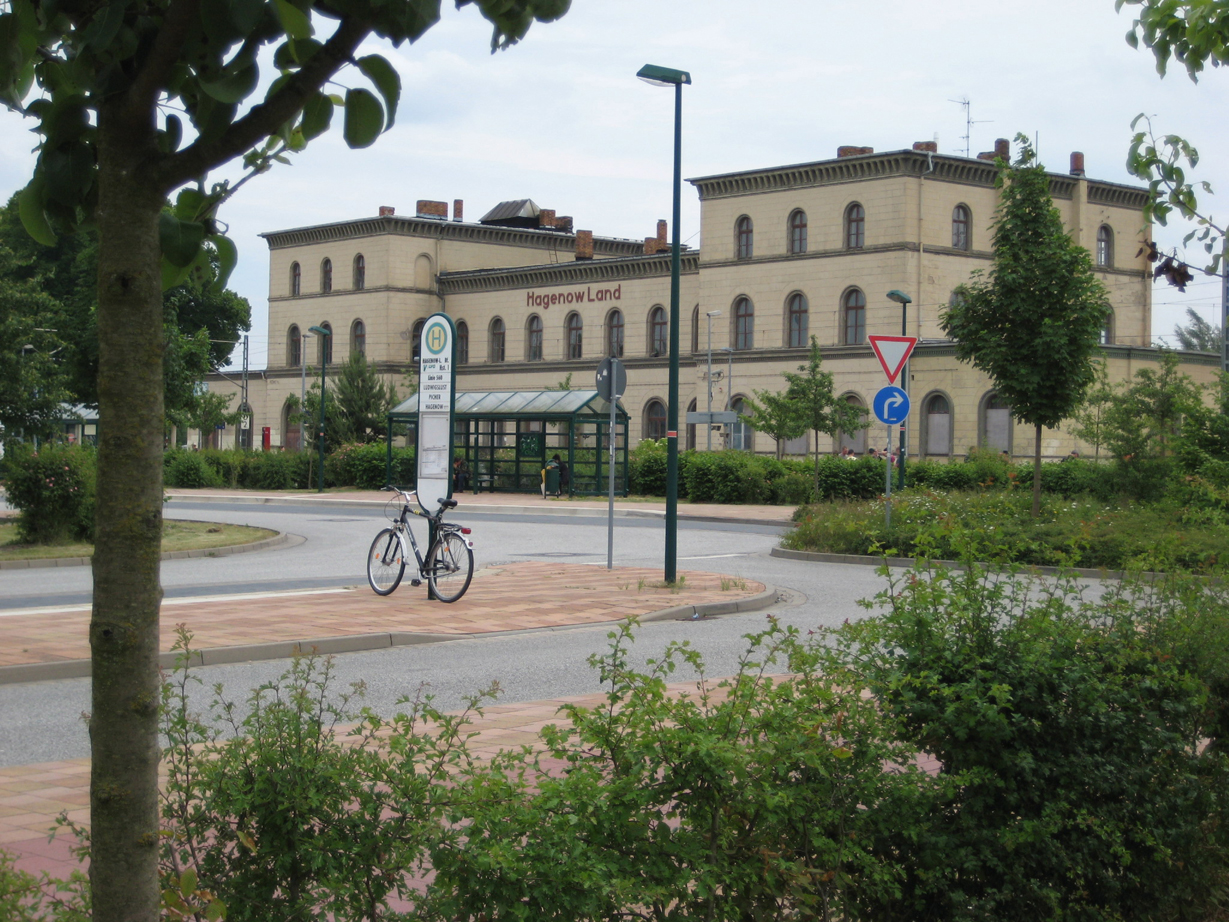
- Station building, west side

General information
- Location: Bahnhofsvorplatz 2, Hagenow Land, MV; Germany
- Coordinates: 53°24′48″N 11°12′57″E
- Lines: Berlin–Hamburg (192 km); Hagenow Land–Schwerin (0.0 km); Hagenow Land–Bad Oldesloe (0.0 km)
- Platforms: 4 (1a, 1b, 2, 3)

Construction
- Accessible: Yes
- Architectural style: Neoclassical

Other information
- Station code: 2468
- DS100 code: WHL
- IBNR: 8010156
- Category: 5
- Website: www.bahnhof.de

History
- Opened: 15 October 1846; 179 years ago
- Electrified: 29 September 1996; 29 years ago, 15 kV 16 2/3 Hz AC system (overhead)

Services
Preceding station	DB Regio Nordost	Following station
Pritzier towards Hamburg Hbf	RE 1	Kirch-Jesar towards Rostock Hbf
Preceding station	Ostdeutsche Eisenbahn	Following station
Hagenow Stadt Terminus	RB 14	Strohkirchen towards Parchim
Location

Hagenow Land station is a railway junction in Mecklenburg-Vorpommern, which was opened on 15 October 1846. It is located about 2.5 kilometres from the centre of the small town of Hagenow. It is classified by Deutsche Bahn as a category 5 station.

The suffix Land in the official station designation indicates, on the one hand, that its location is outside of Hagenow town and is used, on the other, to distinguish it from the station that is situated in the centre of Hagenow; this station is named Hagenow Stadt (town)—until 2010 it was called just Hagenow. It is connected to Hagenow Land by a 3.5 km-long branch line.

== History ==
The fact that the Berlin-Hamburg railway ever made a 20 km detour via the comparatively small town of Hagenow, which then had 3400 inhabitants, resulted from the negotiations of the five states of Prussia, Mecklenburg-Schwerin, Denmark, Lübeck and Hamburg on the construction of the line. The Mecklenburg side under Grand Duke Frederick Francis II undertook in a treaty agreed on 8 November 1841 to subscribe half of the share capital and was able to achieve a route that ran close to the Mecklenburg residence in Schwerin. Hagenow station was provided for the connection with Schwerin (and later with Rostock and Wismar). Original plans foresaw a railway station close to the town. Finally, however, the committee in charge of establishing favourable grades recorded "that a line from Berlin [...] Grabow, Ludwigslust touching Hagenow and Boitzenburg but running at a distance of 5/8 mile on the right and 1/3 mile on the left [. ..] is preferable to any other line" (note the Prussian-Mecklenburg mile was 7,532.5 metres long).

On 15 October 1846, the Berlin-Hamburg railway opened to Boizenburg, then spelled as Boitzenburg. Even before that, on 10 March 1846, the Mecklenburg Railway Company (Mecklenburgische Eisenbahngesellschaft) had received the concession to build a line from Hagenow to Schwerin.

== Routes ==
The Berlin–Hamburg line runs from Ludwigslust, running to the northwest to Hagenow Land and turns just before the station on a wide, almost 90° curve past the wedge-shaped platform and continues to the southwest towards Boizenburg.

The pair of tracks from the direction of Schwerin runs directly from the northeast towards the northwestern side of Hagenow Land station and later connect with the line towards Hamburg. This track layout and the location of Hagenow are shown on an isometric map of 1879.

About 300 m behind the point where the routes from Schwerin and Ludwigslust converge, a single-track line branches off on a tight 90 degree turn to the north-west towards Zarrentin via Hagenow Stadt station. Originally, the line of the Hagenow Land–Bad Oldesloe railway—known as the Kaiserbahn or “Emperor Railway"—continued via Ratzeburg to Bad Oldesloe.

== Significance ==
The Berlin-Hamburg Railway was the first railway line in the Mecklenburg area. Hagenow station thus counts together with stations of Ludwigslust, Grabow (Meckl), Brahlstorf and Boizenburg, which was also opened on 15 October 1846, as the oldest in Mecklenburg. With the opening of the line to Schwerin on 1 May 1847, the station became the first railway junction in Mecklenburg. After nationalisation under an act of 17 May 1884, the Berlin–Hamburg Railway was owned by the government of Prussia, while the line to Schwerin became part of the Grand Duchy of Mecklenburg Friedrich-Franz Railway (Großherzoglich Mecklenburgische Friedrich-Franz-Eisenbahn). Even after the establishment of Deutsche Reichsbahn, both routes were managed by different Reichsbahn divisions (Reichsbahndirektionen) up in 1945.

Between 1894 and 1896, the Emperor Railway was opened in several stages via Ratzeburg to Oldesloe. This shortened the route of the Emperor from Berlin to the headquarters of the Imperial Navy in Kiel. Hagenow received another station on this line near the centre of the town, called Hagenow. The original Hagenow station has since been called Hagenow Land. By 1945 Hagenow Land was an important long-distance station. Almost all express trains between Berlin and Hamburg stopped there and a few express trains also ran between Berlin and Kiel via Ratzeburg and Lübeck.

After the Second World War, the line to Bad Oldesloe was interrupted at the Inner German border west of Zarrentin. The Berlin–Hamburg Railway lost importance as a result of the border. From the 1960s to the late 1980s, a single pair of express trains, an interzonal train from Hamburg to Dresden, continuing to Leipzig, stopped in Hagenow Land each day.

After 1990, long-distance traffic from Berlin and Schwerin to Hamburg increased strongly, reducing the significance of Hagenow Land station. Long-distance trains no longer stopped at the station from 1992 and have only occasionally stopped since 1996.

Passenger services to Zarrentin ended in 2000, only Hagenow Stadt station is served. Hagenow Land station is the main station of the town and is served by the Regional-Express service RE 1 between Rostock and Hamburg via Schwerin (timetable route number 100), which is the more important service. RB 14 services, operated by Ostdeutsche Eisenbahn GmbH (ODEG), run from Hagenow Stadt via Hagenow Land and Ludwigslust to Parchim. Connections to Berlin always require a change of trains, usually in Ludwigslust. Freight operations at Hagenow Land station have been abandoned.

Line	Route	Frequency (mins)
RE 1	Hamburg Hbf – Hagenow Land — Schwerin – Rostock	120
RB 14	Hagenow Stadt – Hagenow Land – Ludwigslust – Parchim	60 (Mon–Fri); 120 (Sat–Sun)

== Platforms ==
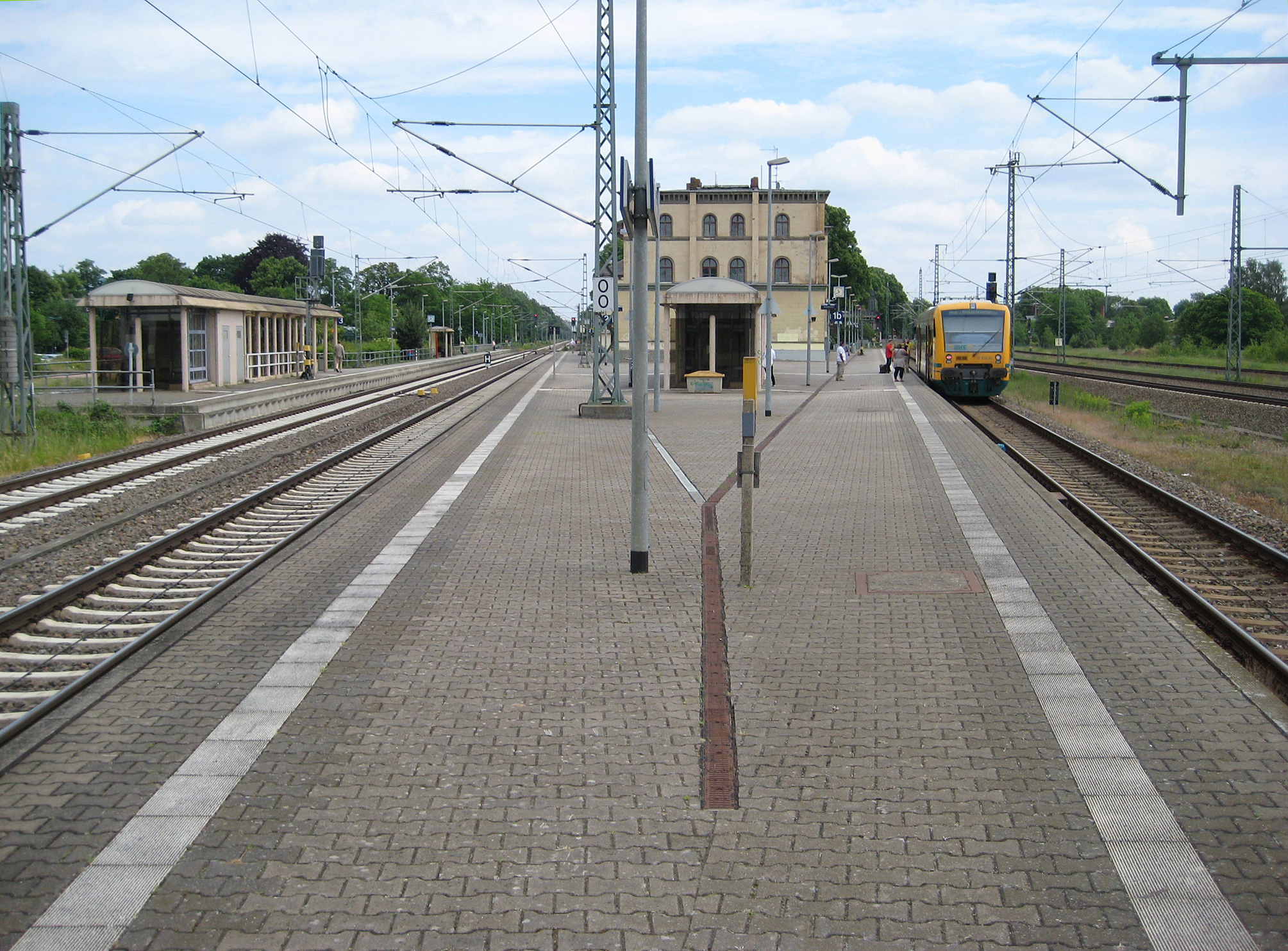
Main platform seen from the southern end. The line towards Berlin on the right, towards Schwerin on the left

The 200 metre-long island platform that the entrance building stands on starts at an acute angle at the junction of the Hagenow Land–Schwerin railway and the main Berlin–Hamburg line, with the two lines diverging so that at the other end it has widened to be 38 m across. In this form Hagenow Land station is a good example of a Keilbahnhof ("wedge station"). On the southeastern ("Prussian") side is track 1 and on the northwestern ("Mecklenburg") side is track 2. Opposite the latter on the line to/from Schwerin is platform 3, which is just as long but considerably narrower.

The mainline tracks of the Berlin–Hamburg line no longer have platforms. Regional trains towards Ludwigslust have to cross the track from Berlin so that they can stop on platform 1.

A pedestrian tunnel connects the wedge platform with the outer platform on track 3, which is part of the Hagenow–Schwerin line. This platform is accessible on the same level from the adjacent parking area and the bus stops.

== Building ==
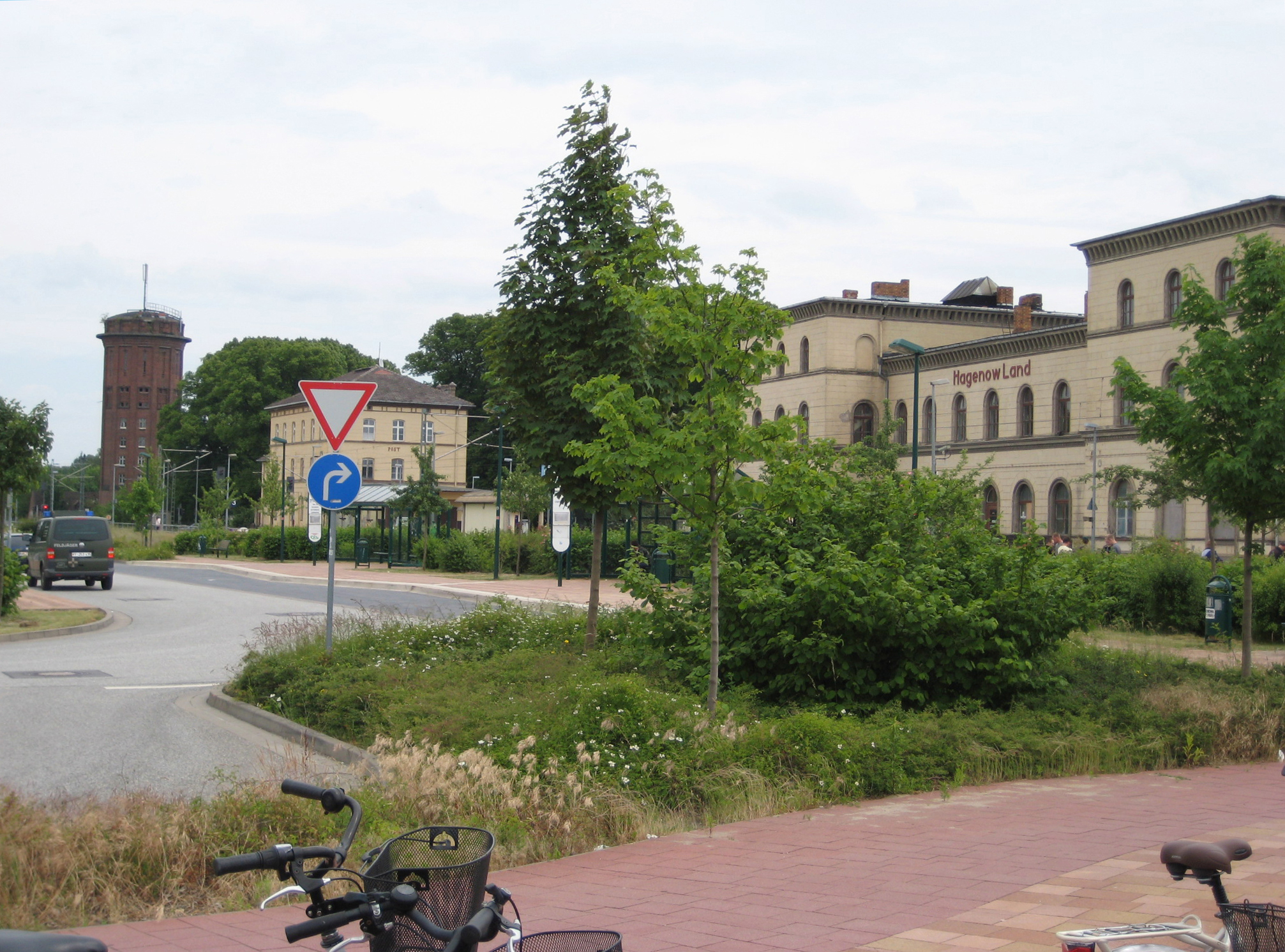
Ensemble of buildings with the water tower, post office and the entrance building (west side)

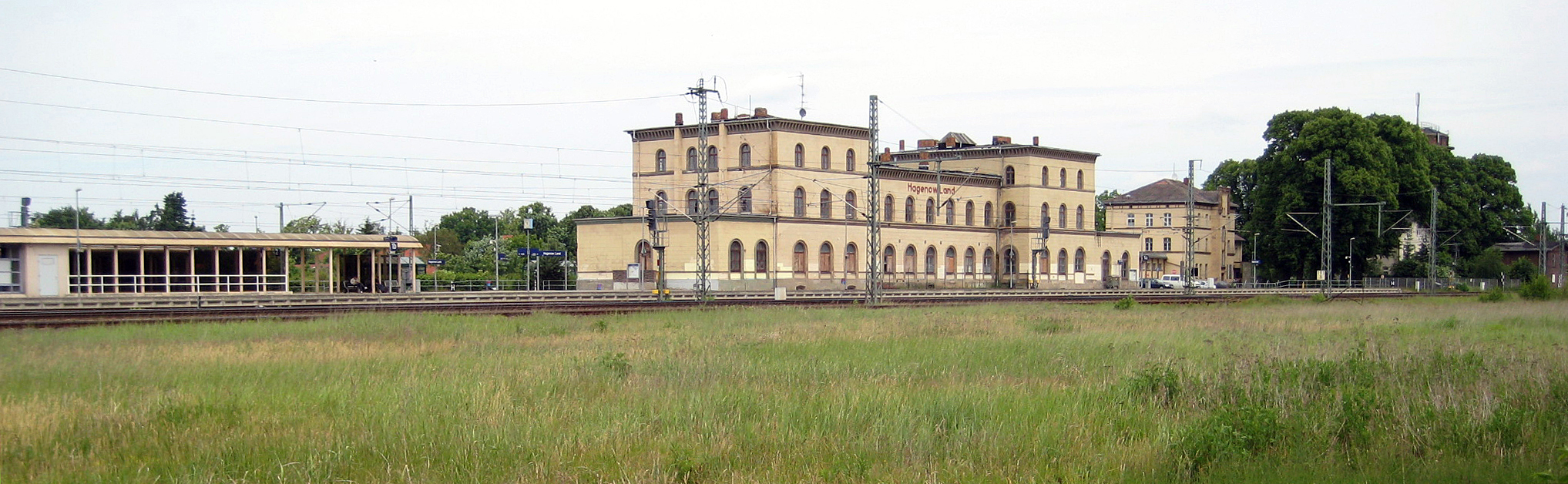
Hagenow Land station from the south

The Neoclassical station building has a two-story midsection with larger three-storey wings on both sides. Stylistically, it is distinguished by the consistent use of arches from the simple straight lines used for most of the historic station buildings on the Berlin-Hamburg line.

Georg Dehio’s Handbook of German Art History (Handbuch der deutschen Kunstgeschichte) says the building is built "in a form based on the Florentine Renaissance palaces," with “components of different heights, a symmetrical structure and horizontal elements with sill cornices, arched windows of each storey decreasing in height and a cantilevered cornice.” It is assumed that the building "...was probably built after a design by F. Neuhaus."

Although the builder and architect Friedrich Neuhaus led the construction of the entire Berlin–Hamburg railway and he was heavily involved for example in the design of the Hamburger Bahnhof in Berlin, the detailed design of the station building has been lost, as is the case for almost all other stations. “However, one can assume with some certainty that Friedrich Neuhaus delivered at least the specifications for all stations on the line, which were then further developed and carried out by local builders.”

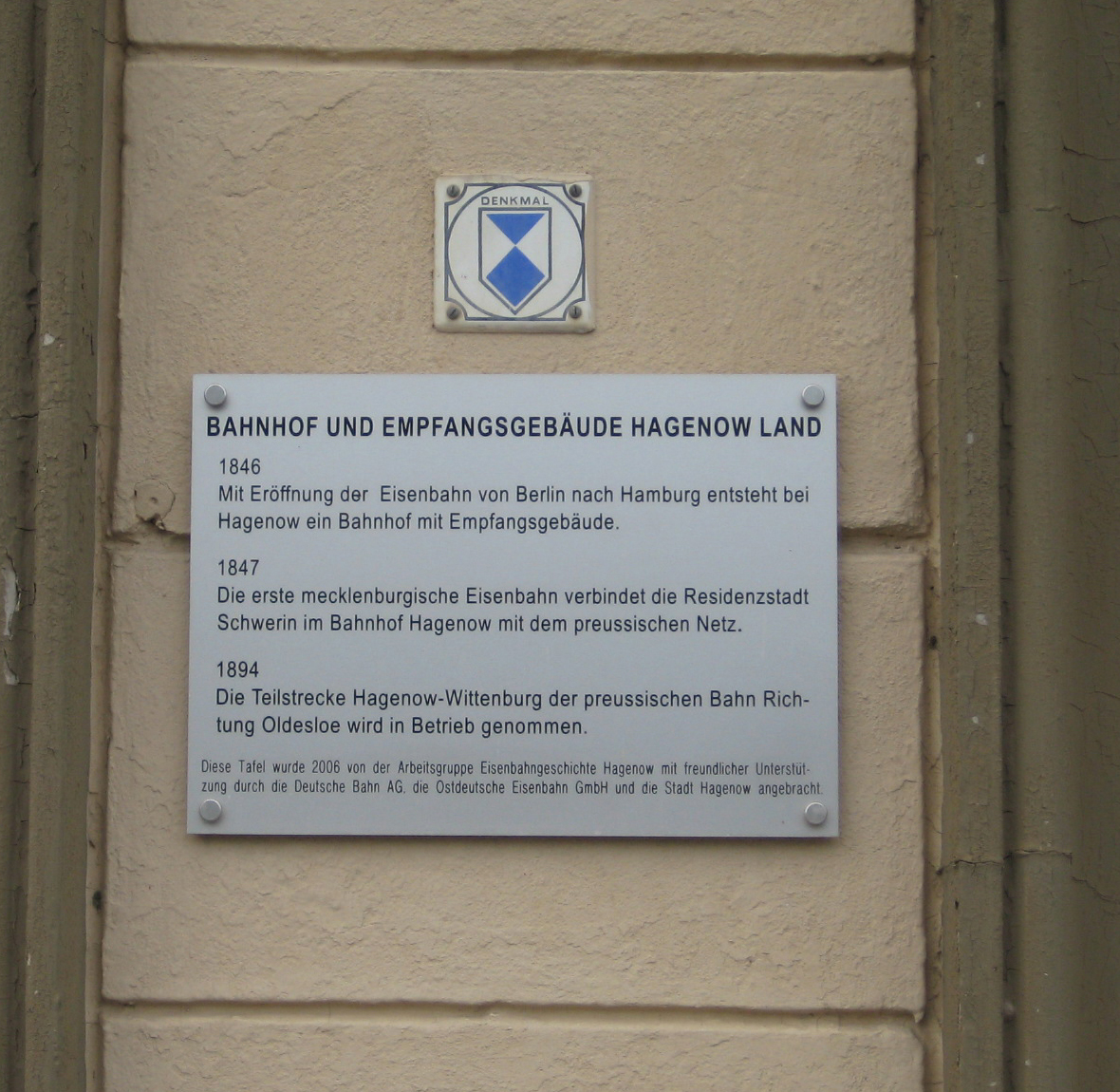
Plaque with heritage listing on the entrance building

The building is a heritage-listed building and on its north side a plaque to this effect has been attached.

There are modern weather protection systems for passengers both on the wedge platform and the outer platform on track 3.

There is an excellent building with the inscription of "Post" on the side of the historical station forecourt located a few meters from the entrance building. It is similar, but built lower and in a simpler style so that it has about the same footprint as one of the side wings of the entrance building. This building is also a listed building.

== Former depot ==
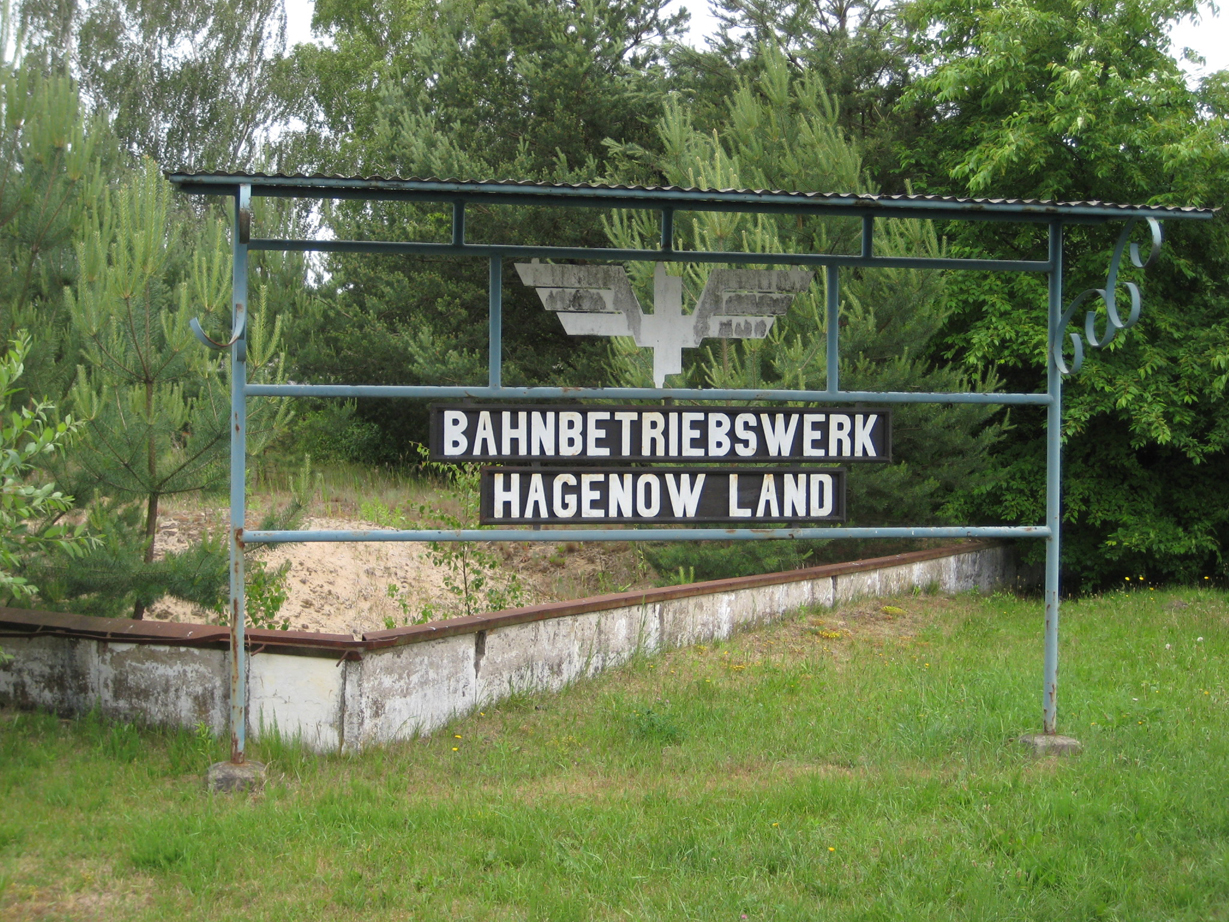
Entrance to the former Hagenow Land depot

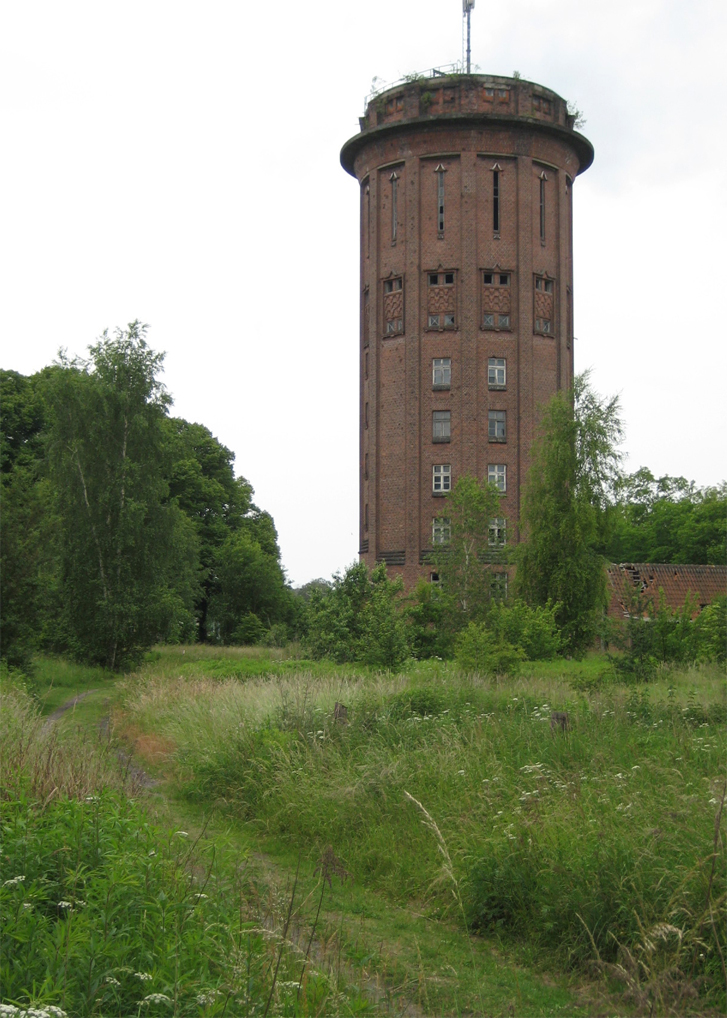
Former water tower at Hagenow Land station

As a starting point of the first railway line towards Mecklenburg-Schwerin Hagenow Land station was equipped with the standard equipment for the maintenance and repair of railway rollingstock. These still exists, but in a highly dilapidated condition. There was a depot (Bahnbetriebswerk), which was located on the south side of the line towards Ludwigslust. It had among other things, a roundhouse with ten stalls and a turntable. Another very similar building nearby suggests a second roundhouse, but all traces of a turntable and sidings that probably once existed have disappeared. There are other sidings and a shed on the property. A former water tower, which is about 30 m-high, is located near the station building. This eleven-storey high, Brick Expressionist construction was built in 1926. It is in a highly dilapidated condition and is a heritage-listed building.

Where there is now a parking area on the western side of the station, in the 1990s there were four additional sidings, running parallel to the tracks towards Schwerin, and at the southern end there was a signal box built as a bridge over the tracks.
