= Grabow (Meckl) station =

Railway station in Germany

Grabow (Meckl)
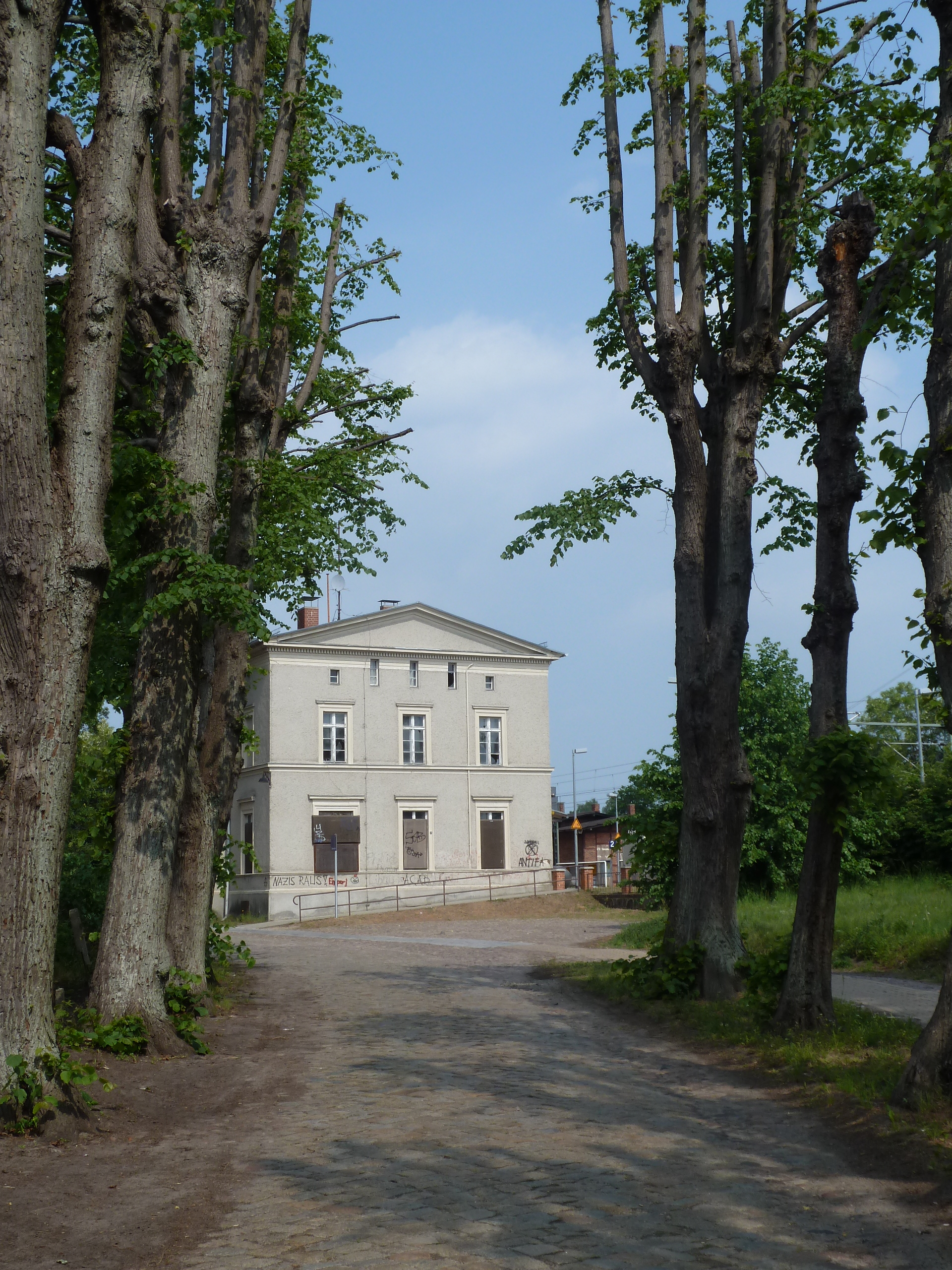
- Street to the station

General information
- Location: Am Bahnhof 3, Grabow, MV; Germany
- Coordinates: 53°16′58″N 11°33′51″E
- Line: Berlin–Hamburg (163.4 km)
- Platforms: 2

Construction
- Accessible: Yes
- Architectural style: Neoclassical

Other information
- Station code: 2225
- DS100 code: WHL
- IBNR: 8011681
- Category: 6
- Website: www.bahnhof.de

History
- Opened: 1 September 1894; 131 years ago
- Electrified: 30 May 1987; 39 years ago, 15 kV 16 2/3 Hz AC system (overhead)

Services
Preceding station	Ostdeutsche Eisenbahn	Following station
Ludwigslust towards Wismar	RE 8	Karstädt towards Elsterwerda
Location

Grabow (Meckl) station is located on the Berlin–Hamburg railway in Grabow in the south west of the German state of Mecklenburg-Vorpommern. Together with four other stations, which also opened on 15 October 1846, it is the oldest station in the state. The Neoclassical entrance building, which dates from the opening of the line, and some other buildings in the station area are heritage-listed.

== Location ==
The station is located in the town of Grabow in the district of Ludwigslust-Parchim, seven kilometres from the railway junction of Ludwigslust. It is located at kilometre 163.2 of the Berlin–Hamburg railway and is the last station in Mecklenburg before the border with Brandenburg. The station is about 500 metres northeast of the city centre. The railway crosses the river Elde southeast of the station.

== History ==
Planning began for the construction of a railway line between Berlin and Hamburg around 1840. Different options were discussed. In Hamburg, a route running from Wittenberge south of the Elbe was favoured. There were several possible routes north of the Elbe, such as a route near the river or further inland. On 8 November 1841, the five states of Prussia, Mecklenburg-Schwerin, Denmark, Lübeck and Hamburg signed a treaty for the construction of a railway line between Berlin and Hamburg. The Mecklenburg side under Grand Duke Frederick Francis II succeeded in achieving a route that was as close as possible to the court in Mecklenburg Schwerin.

A few months before, representatives of the town of Grabow in Berlin had called for the railway to be connected to the town. In March 1841, it was agreed that the town of Grabow would provide the Berlin-Hamburg Railway Company (Berlin-Hamburger Eisenbahngesellschaft) with free land and materials for the construction. The company pledged in return to build at its own expense a station and a freight yard for transfers to and from traffic river on the Elde. First, it was proposed that the line from the town would run on a south-western tangent of the town with the station west of the harbour of Grabow, but later it was proposed that the line would run on the northeastern edge of the town. Both plans were favourable for the town as very little valuable land would have had to given to the railway and, in addition, the nearby town of Ludwigslust would be served at a distance. After a visit by Friedrich Neuhaus to Grabow, it was found that the final route would require the acquisition a number of valuable properties for railway construction and the town had to compensate the owners accordingly. In addition, the new route passed near central Ludwigslust and so greater competition was feared.

=== Station and environment ===
The line between Berlin and Boizenburg was opened on 15 October 1846 and it was the first railway line in Mecklenburg. The connection to Hamburg was completed on 15 December 1846. Stations were opened along with the line in Mecklenburg in Grabow, Ludwigslust, Hagenow, Brahlstorf and Boizenburg. In the first years of operation on the line, Grabow was on the customs border between Mecklenburg and Prussia. The establishment of the North German Confederation in 1867 created a customs union and the controls were abolished.

Navigation on the Elde was improved in the Grabow area in 1868. In response, a transhipment facility was established at the railway bridge in the southern part of the station precinct, where a crane transhipped goods between boats and rail wagons. However, demand remained low and the crane was dismantled in 1885. The area around the station was gradually developed in the second half of the 19th century. The Kießerdamm between the city and station was paved and an avenue of lime trees was built along it for pedestrians. A barrel factory was built at the station in 1858 and the district court and post office were built on Kießerdamm in the following decades. A residential area was established beyond the station in 1890.

There had been aspirations in the first decades after the construction of the line for another line running from Dömitz via Grabow to Parchim and Waren (Müritz); instead the neighbouring Ludwigslust station developed as a railway junction from 1880. As a result, Grabow Station was left behind compared with Ludwigslust.

After the Second World War, the transport patterns changed. The line between Hamburg and Berlin lost its importance due to the emergence of the Inner German border. Traffic between Rostock and Wismar towards Magdeburg and Leipzig, which used the Berlin–Hamburg Railway between Ludwiglust and Wittenberg, increased in importance.

The section between Magdeburg and Schwerin passing through Grabow station was electrified in 1986/87. After German reunification, freight traffic declined on the line. The freight facilities in Grabow station were closed and the freight tracks were dismantled. As part of the rebuilding of the Berlin–Hamburg line for high-speed operations, the former level crossings, including three in the town of Grabow, one at the northern and one at the southern end of the station, were removed and replaced with underpasses.

=== Passenger services ===
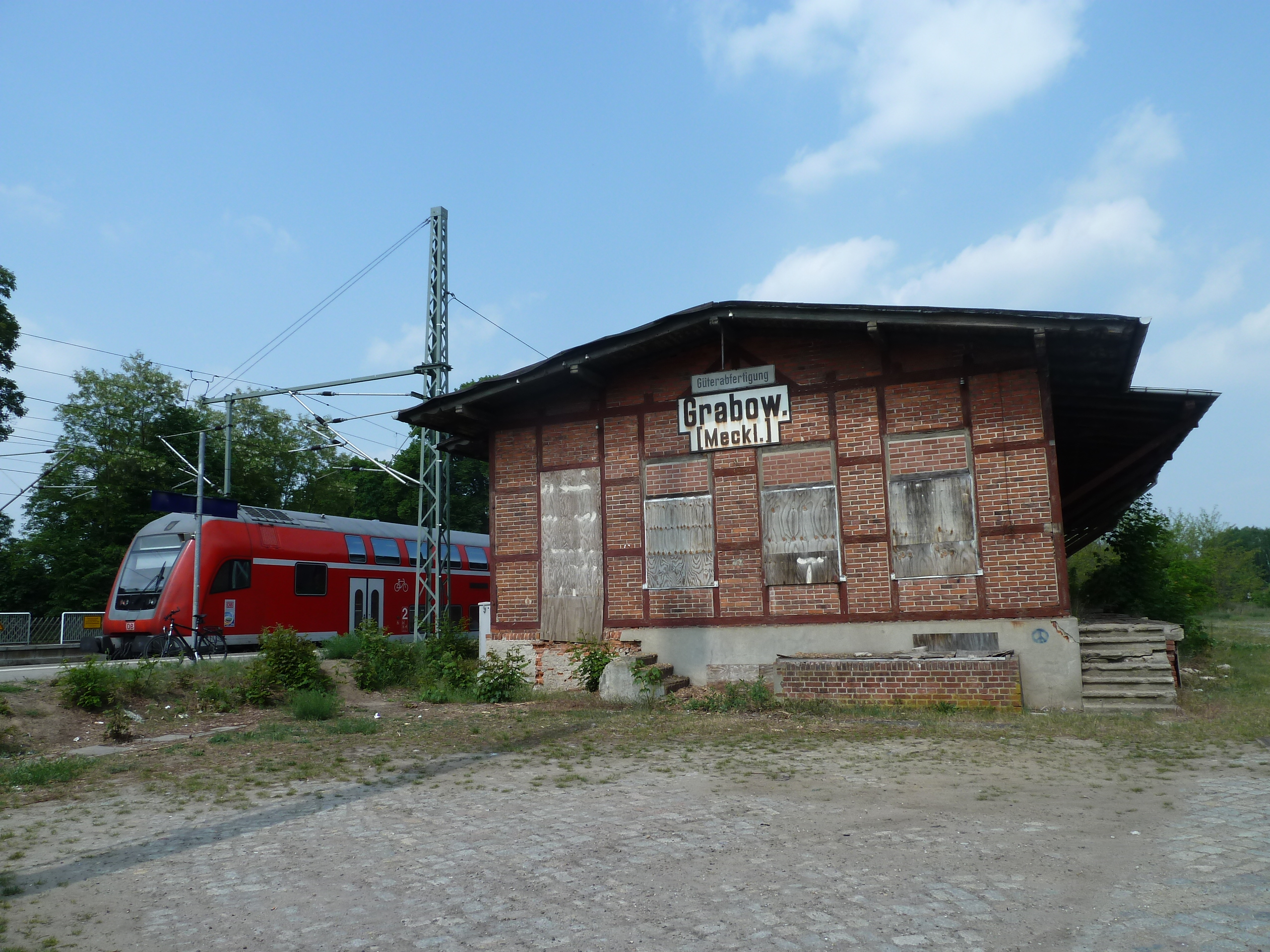
Former goods shed and platform for traffic towards Ludwigslust

In the first years of operation of the line, the station was connected by two pairs of passenger trains and a pair of freight trains (with passenger accommodation) with Hamburg and Berlin and there was also a service from Hamburg to Wittenberge and back.

Before the Second World War, the rail service was relatively active. Grabow station was served by a total of nine pairs of trains a day in 1939. These included four through pairs between Hamburg and Berlin, two pairs of trains between Hamburg and Wittenberge and three pairs that shuttled between Ludwiglust and Grabow. Express (Schnellzug) and semi-fast (Eilzug) passenger trains did not stop at the station.

The importance of the station for passengers increased after the Second World War. In the early 1950s, there was a continuous pair of semi-fast trains from Rostock via Schwerin and Grabow to Zwickau; this service increased during the following four decades to up to four pairs of trains a day. From the 1960s until the early 1990s, the service ran to the south from the station at around 3am from Schwerin to Nauen, a morning train ran from Rostock to Nauen, an afternoon train ran from Schwerin to Berlin and in the early evening a train ran between Schwerin and Wittenberge. In the opposite direction, a fast train from Berlin to Schwerin reached Grabow around 3am, a morning train ran from Wittenberge to Schwerin, at noon a train ran from Nauen to Schwerin and in the early evening a train from Nauen to Rostock reached the station. After Die Wende (the change), traffic increased significantly to Hamburg as direct trains were established.

In the mid-1990s, services were extended and the timetable provided regular-interval services. Since then, Grabow station has been served every two hours. The 2012 timetable provided connections on the RE 2 service from Grabow directly to Wismar, Schwerin and Ludwigslust in the north and to Wittenberge, Nauen, Berlin and Cottbus in the south.

== Infrastructure ==
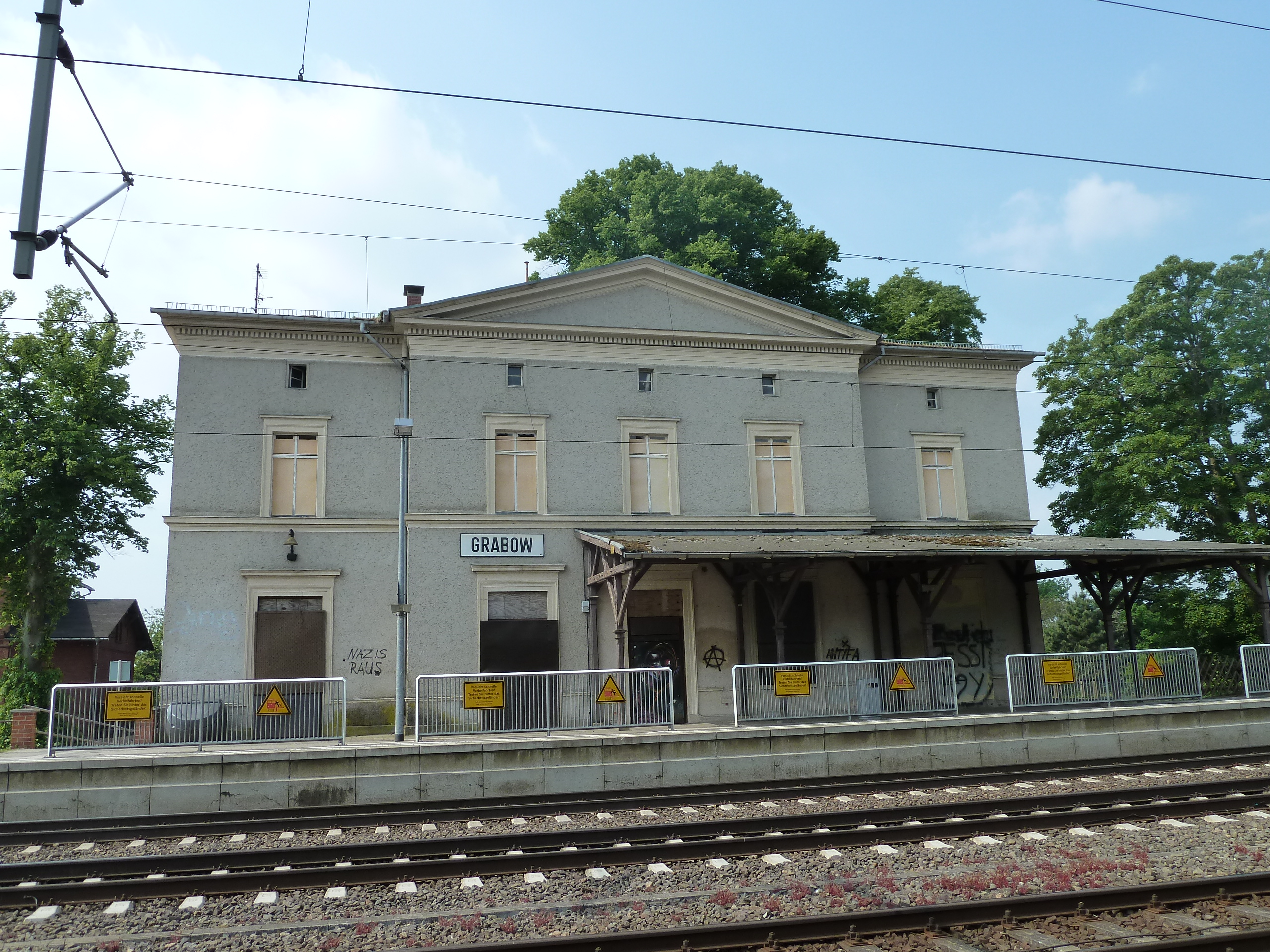
Station building

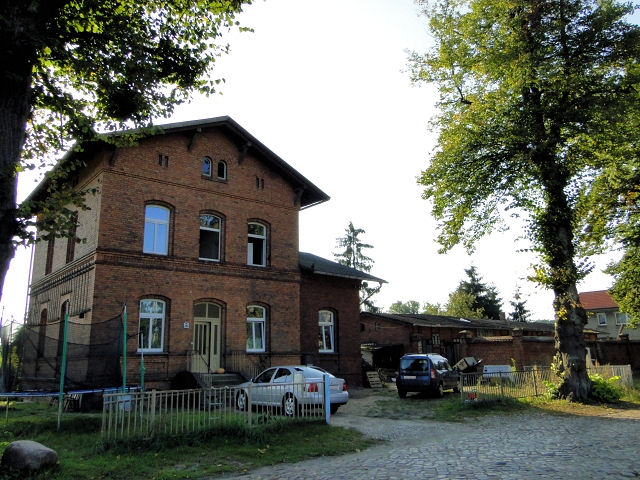
Heritage-listed residence at the station with shed

The station building is located southwest of the tracks. It is a Neoclassical, two-storey building with five portals on its long side and three portals in the transverse direction with a gable roof and a mezzanine (that is a low storey). In both directions, the building had an avant-corps with a triangular gable, so that it has an approximately cross-shaped floor plan. It has not been used for railway purposes since the early 1990s. Until shortly after 2000 there was a restaurant in the building, but since then it has been empty. Its architect is not known by name, but it is believed, due to its similarities to many other buildings on the Berlin–Hamburg line, that the director of the Berlin-Hamburg Railway, Friedrich Neuhaus, delivered at least guidelines for the design of the station. A virtually identical station building was built at Bergedorf station in Hamburg; this was demolished in 1937 during the reconstruction of the local railway facilities.

At the station building, the main platform is on the through track between Ludwiglust and Wittenberge. Until station renovation in the 1990s, an underpass connected under this track to a narrow island platform on the track operating in the opposite direction. Prior to the renovation, freight transport infrastructure lay behind it. These tracks have been removed, except for a track that has since been provided with an outside platform for trains towards Ludwiglust. A timber goods shed has been preserved, but it is empty.

The level crossing at Kießerdamm at the south end of the station was replaced with an underpass in the course of the upgrade of the line to a high-speed line in 2004. This underpass gives access to the platform towards Ludwiglust.

The entrance building, two sheds, a wall and a residential building situated opposite the station have heritage protection.

== Train services ==
The station was served by the following service in 2026:

RE 8: Wismar – Schwerin – Ludwigslust – Grabow – Berlin – – Potsdamer Platz – Südkreuz –Wünsdorf-Waldstadt – Elsterwerda
