= Ludwigslust station =

Railway station in Germany

Ludwigslust
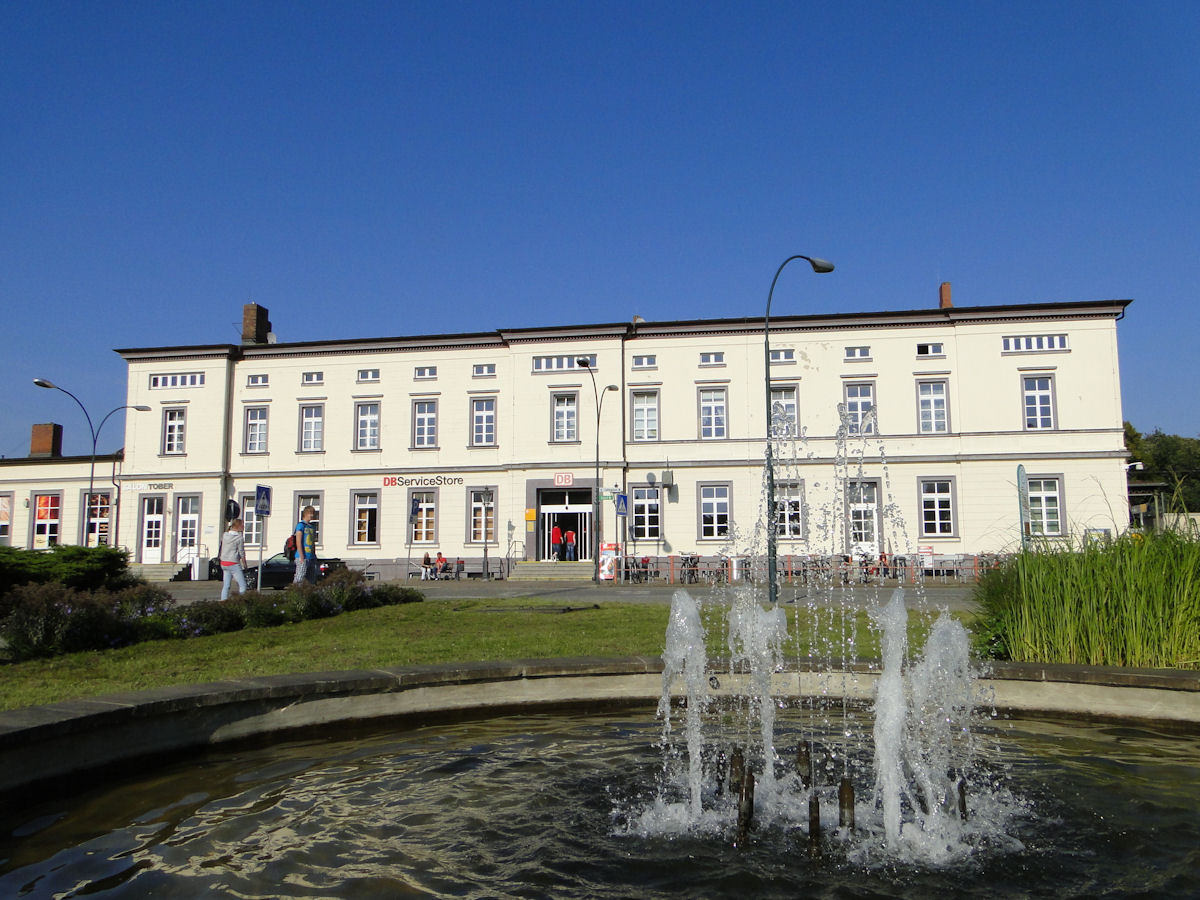

General information
- Location: Rudolf-Tarnow-Str. 1, Ludwigslust, MV; Germany
- Coordinates: 53°20′4″N 11°29′41″E
- Lines: Berlin–Hamburg (170.8 km); Parchim–Ludwigslust (0.0 km); Ludwigslust–Holthusen (30.3 km); Ludwigslust–Dömitz (30.3 km) (dismantled)
- Platforms: 5

Construction
- Accessible: No
- Architectural style: Neoclassical

Other information
- Station code: 3843
- DS100 code: WL
- IBNR: 8010216
- Category: 4
- Website: www.bahnhof.de

History
- Opened: 15 October 1846; 179 years ago
- Electrified: 30 May 1987; 39 years ago, 15 kV 16 2/3 Hz AC system (overhead)
Services
Preceding station	DB Fernverkehr	Following station
Hamburg Hbf towards Berlin Gesundbrunnen or Hamburg-Altona	ICE 18	Wittenberge towards München Hbf
Hamburg Hbf towards Hamburg-Altona or Kiel Hbf	ICE 28	Wittenberge towards München Hbf
Schwerin Hbf towards Warnemünde	IC 57	Wittenberge towards Leipzig Hbf
Preceding station	Ostdeutsche Eisenbahn	Following station
Lüblow (Meckl) towards Wismar	RE 8	Grabow (Meckl) towards Elsterwerda
Preceding station	DB Regio Nordost	Following station
Jasnitz towards Nauen	RB 14	Groß Laasch towards Berlin Ostbahnhof
Terminus	RB 17	Lüblow (Meckl) towards Wismar
Terminus	RB 28	Schwerin Mitte towards Bad Kleinen
Location

Ludwigslust (German: Bahnhof Ludwigslust) is a railway station in the town of Ludwigslust in the German state of Mecklenburg-Vorpommern. The station was opened in 1846 and lies on the Berlin–Hamburg Railway, the Ludwigslust–Wismar railway, the Parchim–Ludwigslust railway and the Ludwigslust–Dömitz railway. The station building, platform, engine shed and water tower are heritage-listed.

== Location ==
Ludwigslust station is located in the north of the built-up urban area at kilometre 170.8 of the Berlin–Hamburg line. It is connected to the town centre by Bahnhofsstraße (“station street”), which runs as a two-lane cobble-stoned avenue parallel with the Ludwigslust Canal. The street formerly continued towards Wöbbelin, but the level crossing at the south side of the station was closed in 1996 during upgrading of the line. The Ludwigslust Canal passes under the railway tracks at the south side of the station. The hospital of the Stift Bethlehem is across the canal from the station. There are bus stops in the station forecourt.

== Infrastructure ==
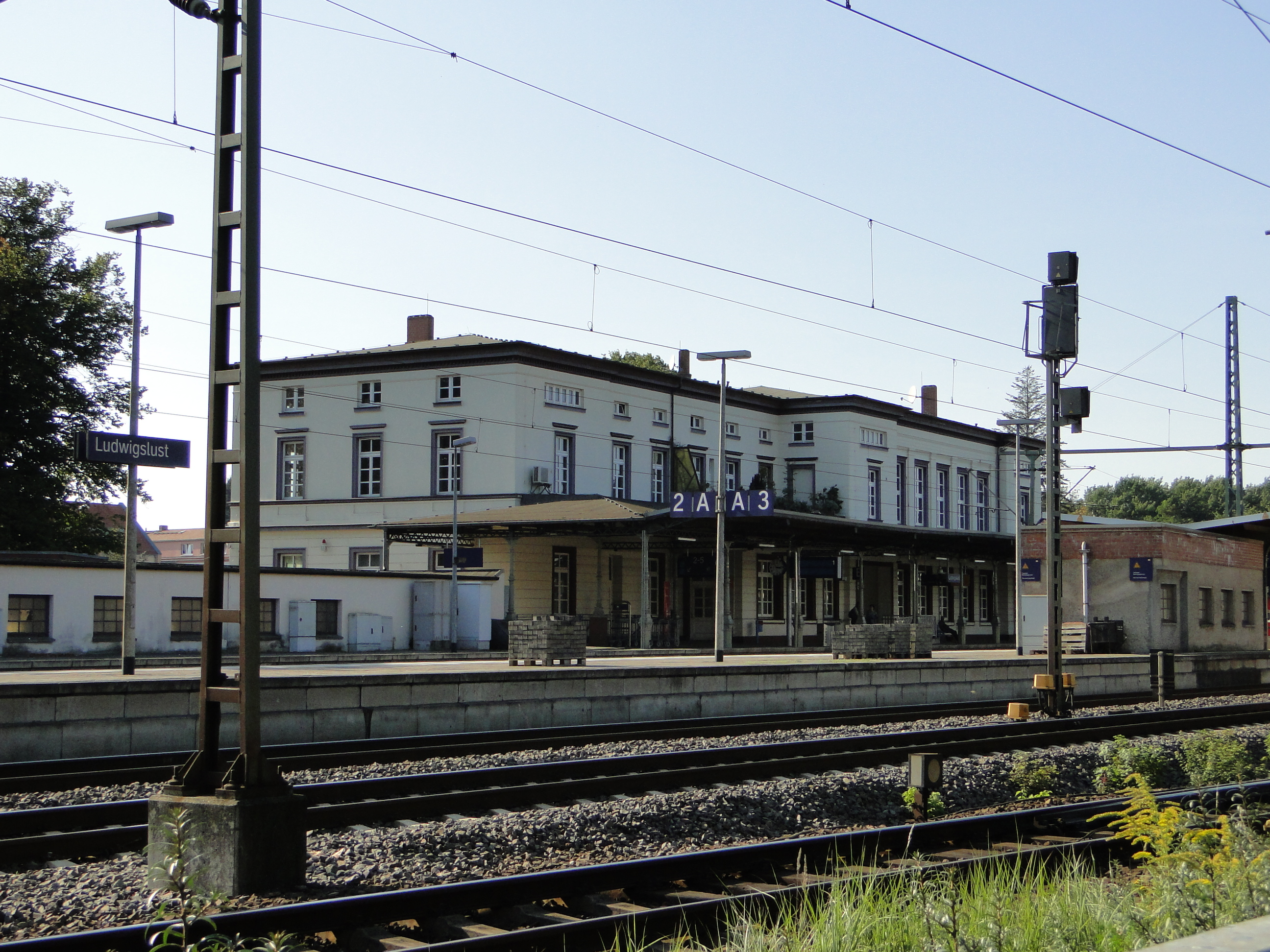
Station building from the track side

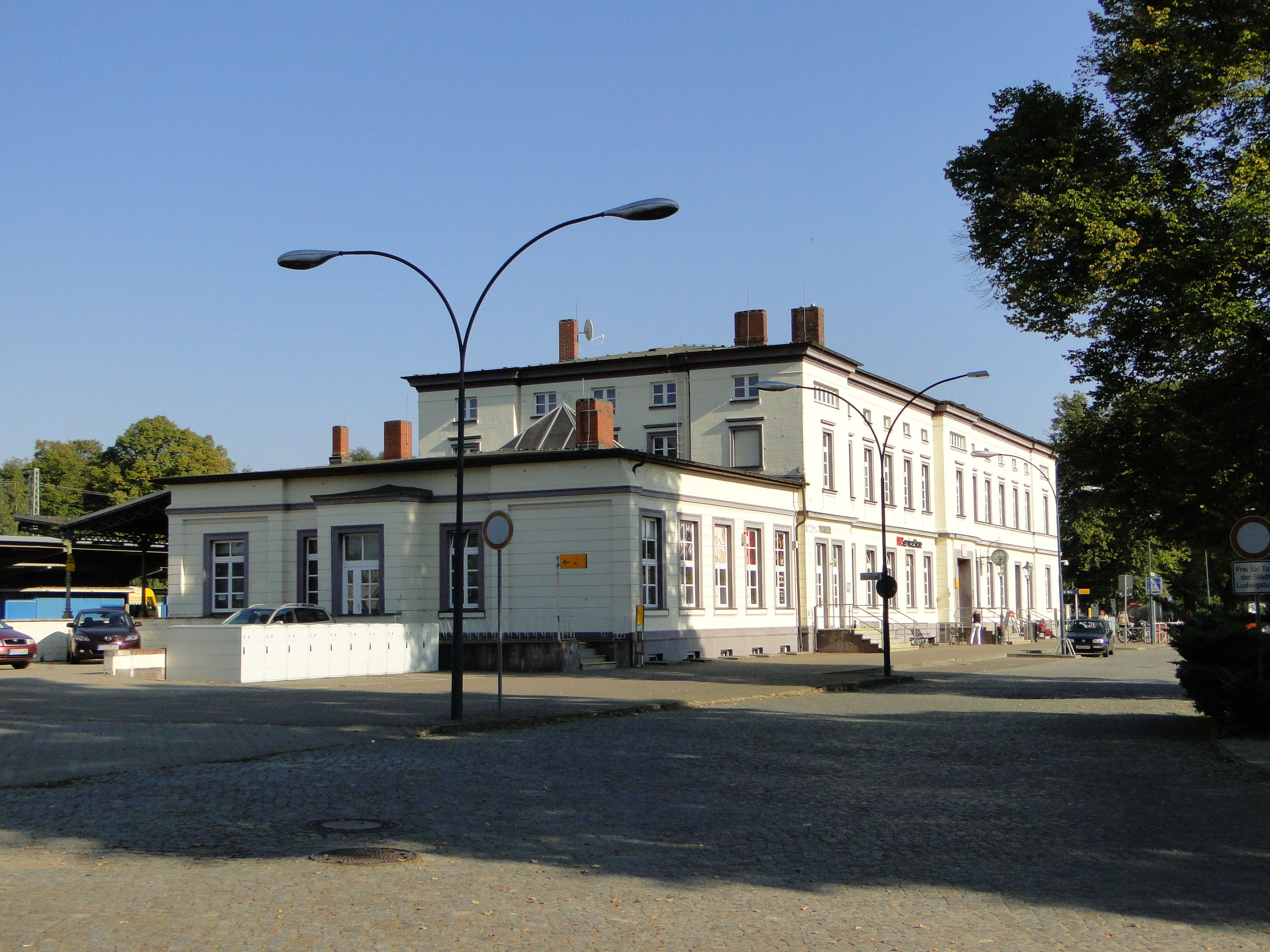
View of the extension from the northwest side ("prince's room")

Like almost all other buildings on the Berlin-Hamburg railway, the entrance building of the station Ludwig lust is built in the Neoclassical style. The specifications for the building are believed to have been directed by Friedrich Neuhaus. In its initial state, the building had seven portals on its long side and five portals in the transverse direction. There is a mezzanine (that is a low storey) above the second storey. The building is covered by a shallow hip roof. The architectural design in its original state included avant-corps at its corners, had restrained ornaments and a bright shiny colour. The windows of the upper storey between the avant-corps on the side next to the tracks are installed higher than on the other sides. Between them there are pilasters. There are no separate windows on the mezzanine level.

The entrance building had to be extended to handle the construction and commissioning of additional railway lines. Thus, the part of the building on the right, as viewed from the street, was built. Since it was built in the same style, it is only possible to see the beginning of the extension on close inspection. The newly built corner avant-corps is wider than the avant-corps at the left corner and the avant-corps that is currently at the centre. The new extension has three narrower transverse portals than the rest of the building. The roof of the main platform is attached to the station building wall. Inside the building, departments were assigned new spaces as part of the modification, accordingly the post office went into the room previously used for the telegraph, the 1st and 2nd class waiting rooms were moved to the new extension along with the telegraph room and the baggage handling area. On the second floor there were apartments, an office and the room of the messengers. The windows on the mezzanine floor were subsequently enlarged.

The single-storey extension on the north side, the so-called Fürstenzimmer (prince's room) contained a large room, a ladies room with washing facilities and a side room and was intended for the ducal family, who had their summer residence at Ludwigslust Palace.

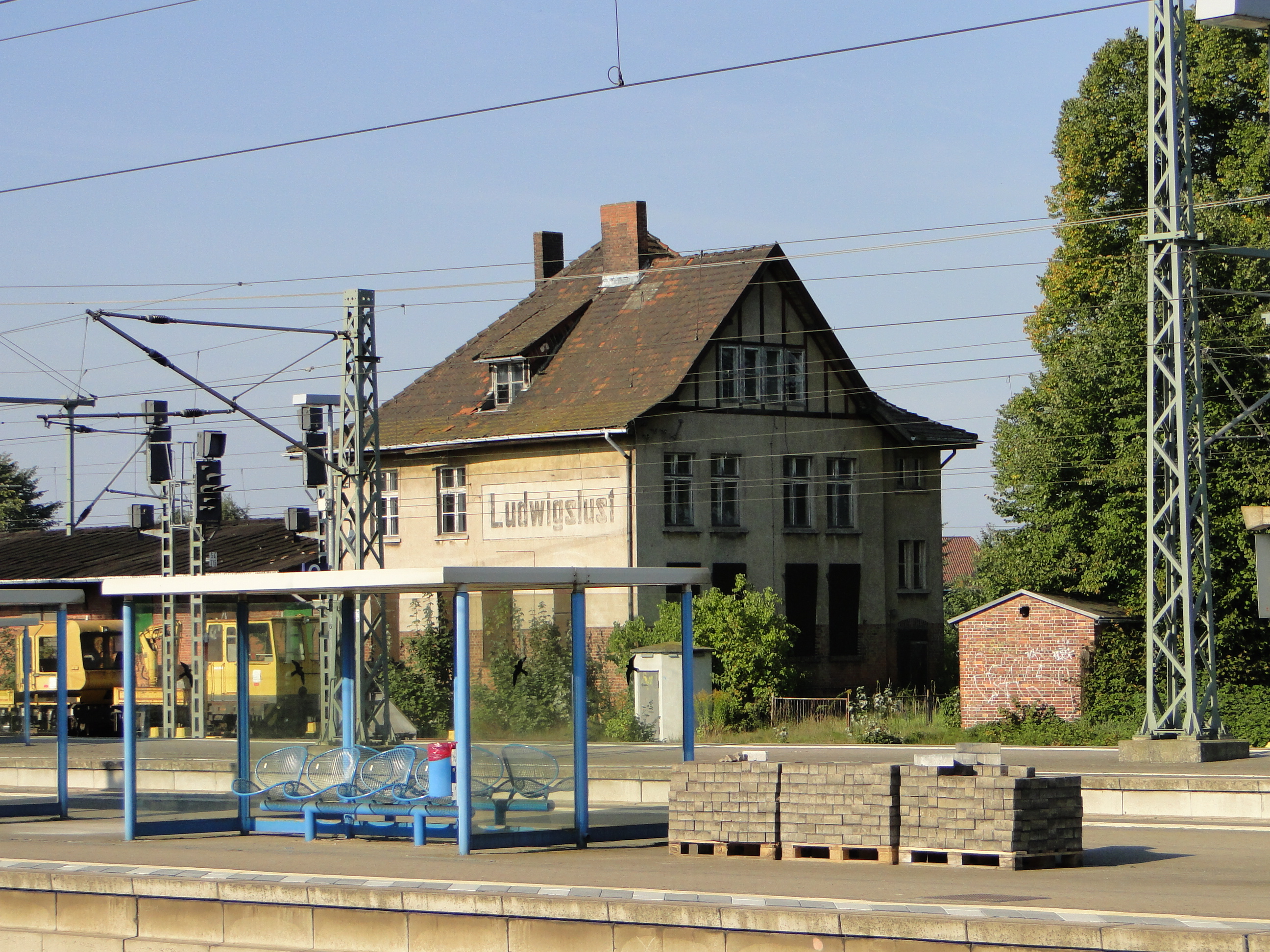
Former goods dispatch

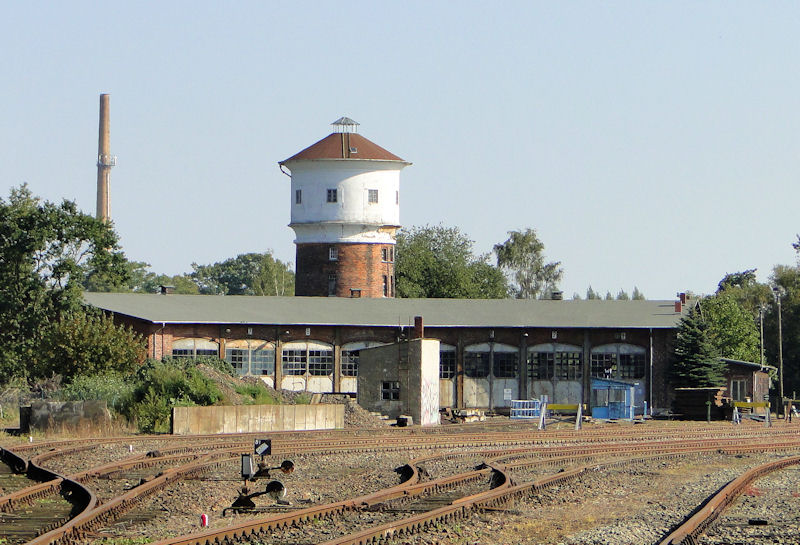
Roundhouse with turntable and water tower

=== Platforms ===
The station has a main platform next to the building and two central platforms, serving a total of five tracks. All platforms are accessible from a pedestrian underpass, which also connects Bahnhofsstraße with Wöbbeliner Straße on the south side of the station. The main platform can also be reached by track-side exit from the station building. The station is currently being rebuilt as part of the upgrade of the Berlin–Hamburg line and it is expected that it will become fully accessible during 2026.

=== Other parts of the station precinct ===
Northwest of the platforms are the remaining non-electrified marshalling sidings. These were built in 1912, including the freight office, the round roundhouse with its turntable and a water tower. Even the unused hump can still be seen. Trees were already growing in its yard's track beds in September 2011.

== History ==
On 27 July 1843, the inaugural meeting of the Berlin-Hamburg Railway Company (Berlin-Hamburger Eisenbahn-Gesellschaft) took place in Ludwiglust. Work started on the construction of the line between Berlin and Hamburg at the town less than a year later on 6 May 1844. The station was built in the town of Kleinow/Klenow, which with the spread of the urban area later became part of Ludwiglust. The line between Berlin and Boizenburg was opened on 15 October 1846. Exactly two months later, the remaining section was opened to Hamburg. Initially only one train per day operated in each direction. In May 1847, there were two pairs of passenger trains and a pair of freight trains.

The city of Schwerin was connected to the Berlin-Hamburg line at first only via Hagenow Land station over the Hagenow Land–Schwerin railway, which opened in 1847. Although Ludwigslust was still the summer residence of the dukes of Mecklenburg, the direct connection to Schwerin via Holthusen did not open until 1 October 1889. The Parchim-Ludwigslust railway opened on 15 June 1880. The Ludwigslust–Malliß railway opened on 20 May 1890; the connecting section from Malliß to Dömitz had already been opened in 1889.

Until 1920, when the state railways in the German Empire were united within Deutsche Reichsbahn, Ludwigslust station was a joint station of the Prussian state railways and the Grand Duchy of Mecklenburg Friedrich-Franz Railway, leading to conflicts in the distribution of the costs of extensions to the station. As early as 1898, the railway administration in Schwerin wanted an additional island platform for ensuring connections to Hamburg and Berlin. The need for extensions was also significant in 1899, when some freight trains had to be left on the open line due to lack of space. Extensive upgrading took place between 1909 and 1913. Thus, earth was taken from between Ludwigslust and Eldena and heaped on the station premises and laid under the railway tracks. A goods shed that had been converted in 1890 was demolished in 1911 to make room for new tracks and replaced by a new building in 1912. The water tower and a new engine shed was also built in 1912. The new sets of points were protected by new signal boxes called "Lw" (northwest side) and "Lo" (southeast side). The tracks to the west of platform 2, which replaced the existing A to E parking tracks, were controlled by signal box "Lb".

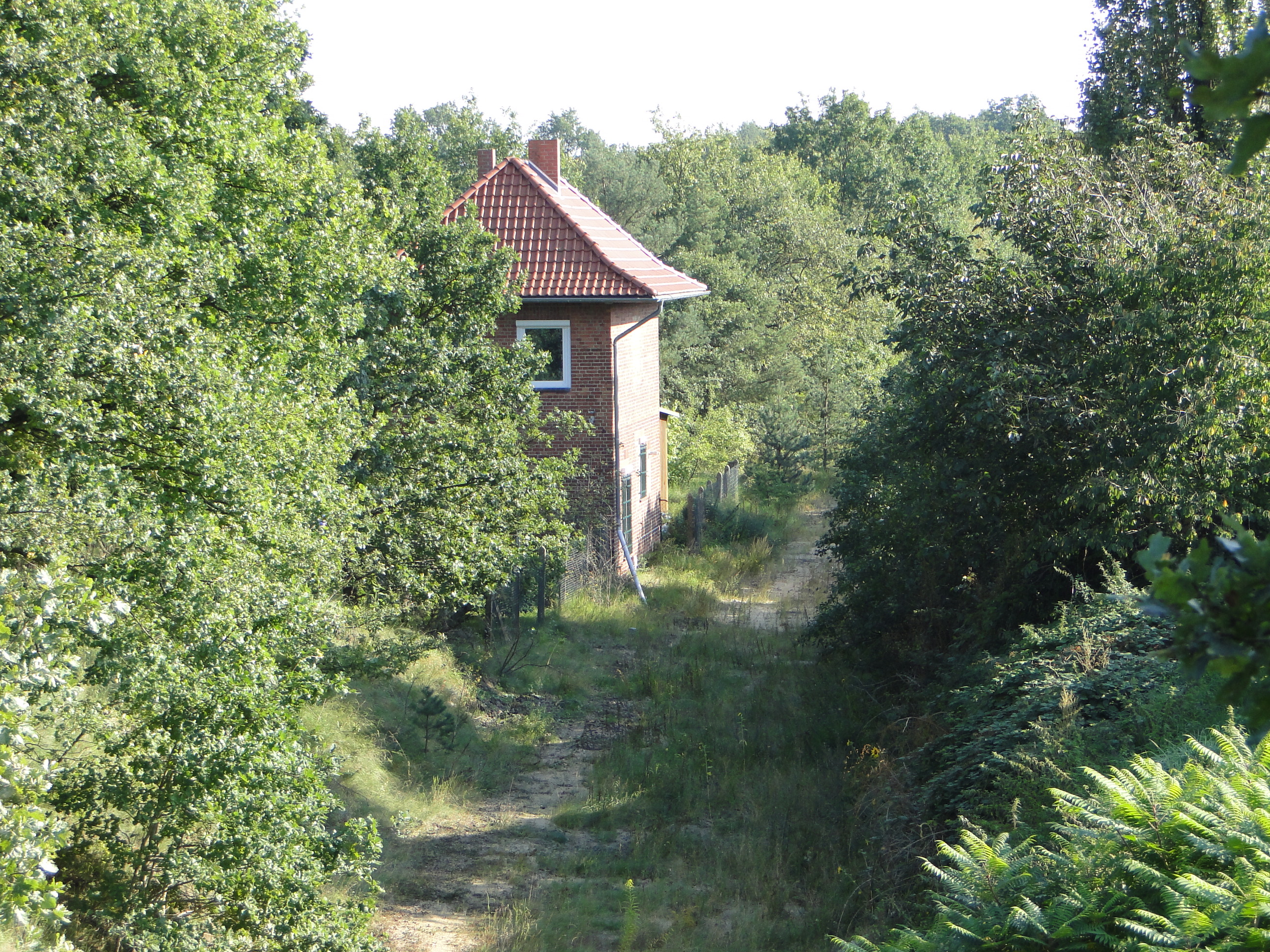
Former signal box "Lvs" dismantled with the line to Dömitz

On 1 October 1913, a connecting curve was put into operation southeast of the station between the lines to Dömitz and Parchim, under the control of signal boxes "Lvn" and "Lvs", enabling freight trains to bypass the station and to avoid Prussian state railways charges for the use of the line. Under Deutsche Reichsbahn there was no reason for this connection and it was dismantled in 1925. It was reconstructed in 1943 for military reasons. After the war, however, the track and the mechanisms in the two signal boxes were removed.

The railway junction was destroyed in an air raid on 22 February 1945. This failed, however, to damage the station area, except for an apartment in the station building, the "Lm" signal box and the building of the track master (Bahnmeisterei); these were later rebuilt. However, houses were hit near the station. The air raid killed about 150 people in Ludwigslust.

The station's central signal box "B 1" was opened in 1957. Deutsche Post opened a packet handling facility at the station on 27 May 1962 and, from 31 May 1964, all parcels between the three northern districts of German Democratic Republic, Neubrandenburg, Rostock and Schwerin and the Federal Republic of Germany were handled here. The facility, which had its own railway sidings, operated until 1993. The station post office, established in 1913, was later closed. The second mainline track between Wittenberg and Schwerin was rebuilt after 1980.

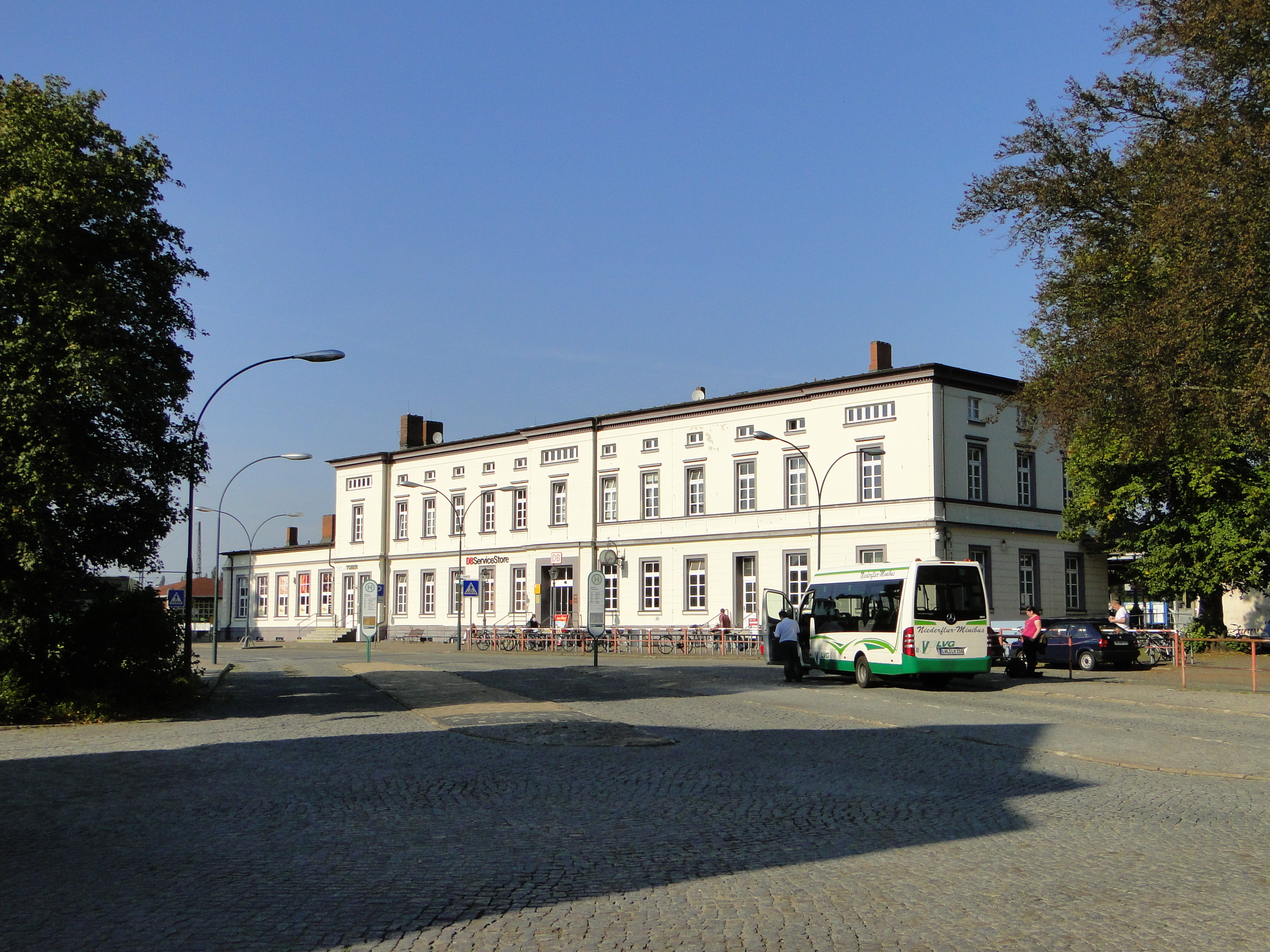
View of the entrance building from the city-side with bus stop

The line between Magdeburg and Schwerin through Ludwigslust station was electrified in 1986/87. From German reunification until 1996/1997, the line between Berlin and Hamburg was upgraded and has been operated with Intercity-Express services since 1997. During this reconstruction, bombs from the Second World War were found on 26 and 28 March 1996. The level crossing near the station was closed during the construction in 1996 and the platforms were renewed. Signal box "B1" was closed in the spring of 1998 and it was demolished in July 2006. By 2003, railway traffic was controlled from the electronic signalling centre at Hagenow Land under direction from the operations centre in Berlin-Pankow. In a second stage, the Berlin–Hamburg line was upgraded for speeds up to 230 km/h in 2004.

With effect from May 2000, passenger services were abandoned on the line to Dömitz and the line finally closed in 2001 and it was dismantled in the following years. "Lo" signal box was demolished on 23 and 24 May 2009.

== Rail services ==
The station was served by the following services in 2026:

=== Long distance trains ===
Line	Route	Frequency	Operator
ICE 18	Hamburg-Altona – Hamburg – Ludwigslust – Berlin – Halle – Erfurt – Nuremberg – Augsburg – Munich	Every 4 hours	DB Fernverkehr
ICE 28	Hamburg-Altona – Hamburg – Ludwigslust – Berlin – Leipzig – Erfurt – Halle – Nuremberg – Munich	Every 4 hours	DB Fernverkehr
IC 57	Warnemünde – Rostock – Ludwigslust – Magdeburg – Halle – Leipzig	Two train pairs	DB Fernverkehr

=== Regional trains ===
Line	Route	Frequency (min)
RE 8	Wismar – Schwerin – Ludwigslust – Berlin – Potsdamer Platz – Südkreuz – Wünsdorf-Waldstadt – Elsterwerda	Every 2 hours
RB 14	Hagenow Stadt – Ludwigslust – Parchim	Every hour
RB 17	Wismar – Schwerin – Ludwigslust	Every 2 hours
RB 28	Ludwigslust – Schwerin – Bad Kleinen ← Bützow ← Rostock	Some trains
