= Jutland =

Peninsula in Europe

Coordinates: 55°N 9°E

The North Jutlandic Island is still regarded as a part of Jutland although the isthmus connecting it to mainland Jutland was severed by a flood in 1825. Northern Jutland (Denmark) South Jutland or Northern Slesvig (Denmark) Southern Schleswig (Germany) Holstein (Germany)

Jutland (/ˈdʒʌtlənd/, JUT-lənd) is a peninsula in Northern Europe that forms the continental portion of Denmark and part of northern Germany (Schleswig-Holstein). It stretches from the Grenen spit in the north to the confluence of the Elbe and the Sude in the southeast. The historic southern border river of Jutland as a cultural-geographical region, which historically also included Southern Schleswig, is the Eider. The peninsula, on the other hand, also comprises areas south of the Eider: Holstein, the former duchy of Lauenburg, and most of Hamburg and Lübeck.

Jutland's geography is flat, with comparatively steep hills in the east and a barely noticeable ridge running through the center. West Jutland is characterised by open lands, heaths, plains, and peat bogs, while East Jutland is more fertile with lakes and lush forests. The southwestern coast is characterised by the Wadden Sea, a large, unique international coastal region stretching through Denmark, Germany, and the Netherlands. The peninsula's longest river is the Eider, which rises close to the Baltic but flows in the direction of the North Sea due to a moraine, while the Gudenå is the longest river of Denmark. In order for ships not having to go around the whole peninsula to reach the Baltic, the Kiel Canal – the world's busiest artificial waterway, crossing the peninsula in the south – was constructed.

Jutland is connected to Funen by the Old and New Little Belt Bridge, and Funen in turn is connected to Zealand and Copenhagen by the Great Belt Bridge.

== Etymology ==
Jutland is known by several different names, depending on the language and era, including Danish: Jylland [ˈjyˌlænˀ]; German: Jütland [ˈjyːtlant]; Old English: Ēota land [ˈeːotɑˌlɑnd], known anciently as the Cimbric Peninsula or Cimbrian Peninsula (Latin: Cimbricus Chersonesus; Danish: den Kimbriske Halvø or den Jyske Halvø; German: Kimbrische Halbinsel or Jütische Halbinsel). The names are derived from the Jutes and the Cimbri, respectively.

== Geography ==
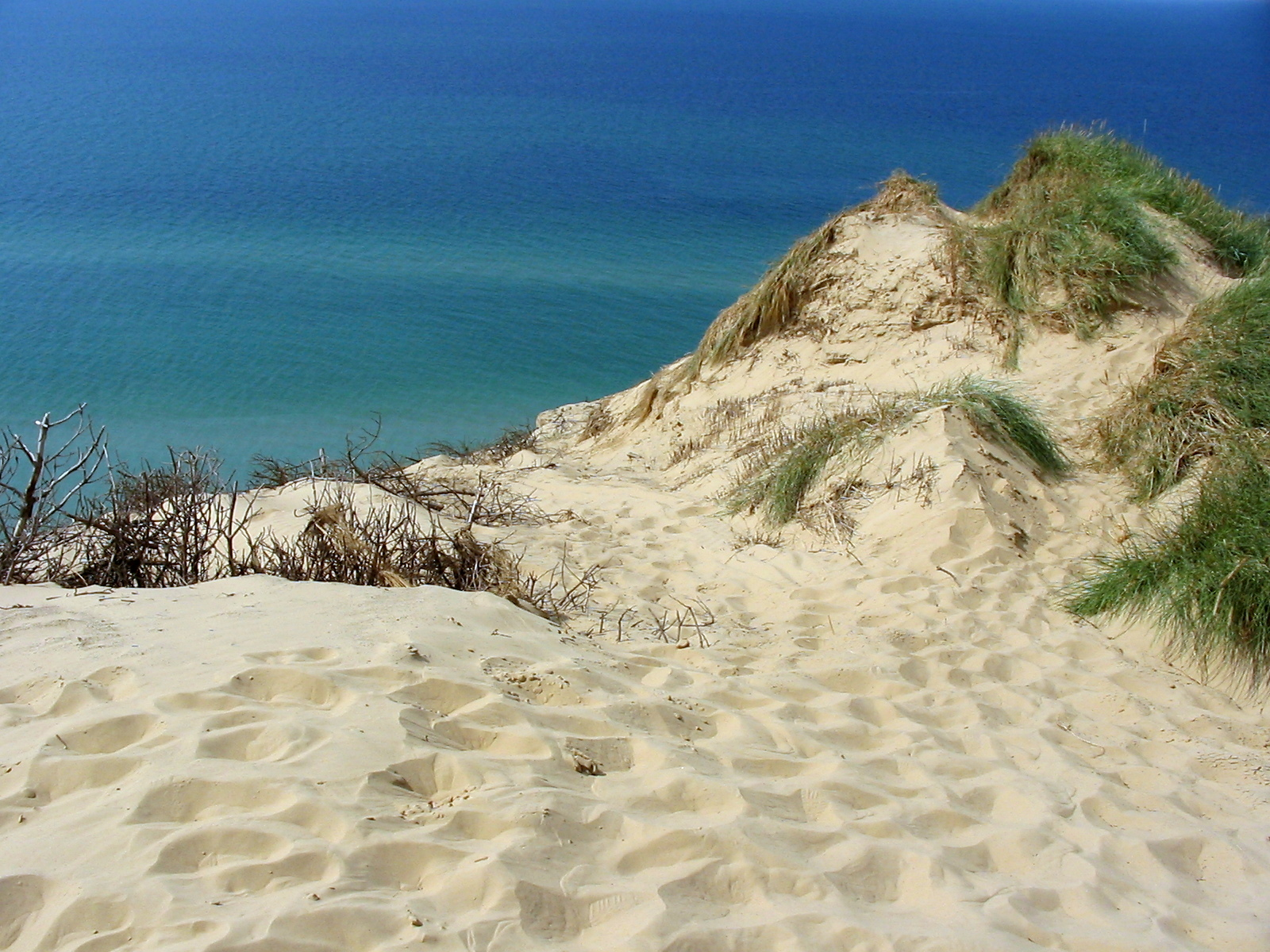
Dunes on Jutland's northwest coast

=== Distinction between the Jutland peninsula and Jutland ===
The Jutland peninsula reaches from the sandbar spit of Grenen on the North Jutlandic Island in the north, to the banks of the Elbe in the south. The peninsula is also called the Cimbric peninsula.

Jutland as a cultural-geographical term mostly only refers to the Danish part of the peninsula, from Grenen to the Danish-German border. Sometimes, the northern part of Schleswig-Holstein down to the Eider (Southern Schleswig), is also included in the cultural-geographical definition of Jutland, because the Eider was historically the southern border of Denmark and the cultural and linguistic boundary between the Nordic countries and Germany from c. 850 to the 18th century.

In Denmark, the term Jylland can refer both to the whole peninsula and to the region between Grenen and either the Danish-German border or the Eider.

In Germany, however, the peninsula as a whole is only referred to as Kimbrische Halbinsel or Jütische Halbinsel, while the term Jütland is reserved solely for the cultural-geographical definition of Jutland.

=== Maritime border ===
The Jutland peninsula is bounded by the North Sea to the west, the Skagerrak to the north, the Kattegat to the northeast, and the Baltic Sea to the southeast. The peninsula's Kattegat and Baltic coastline stretches from Grenen down to the mouth of the Trave in Lübeck-Travemünde, and its Skagerrak and North Sea coastline runs from Grenen until down to the Geesthacht barrage east of Hamburg, which is defined as the point where the Lower Elbe (Unterelbe) and the estuary of the Elbe, that are subject to the tides, begin. The part of the Baltic Sea the peninsula is bounded by is referred to as da:Bælthavet in Danish and de:Beltsee in German, a designation deriving from the Great, Little, and Fehmarn belts, while the Baltic Sea as a whole is called Østersøen and Ostsee, respectively.

=== Land border ===
The peninsula's land border

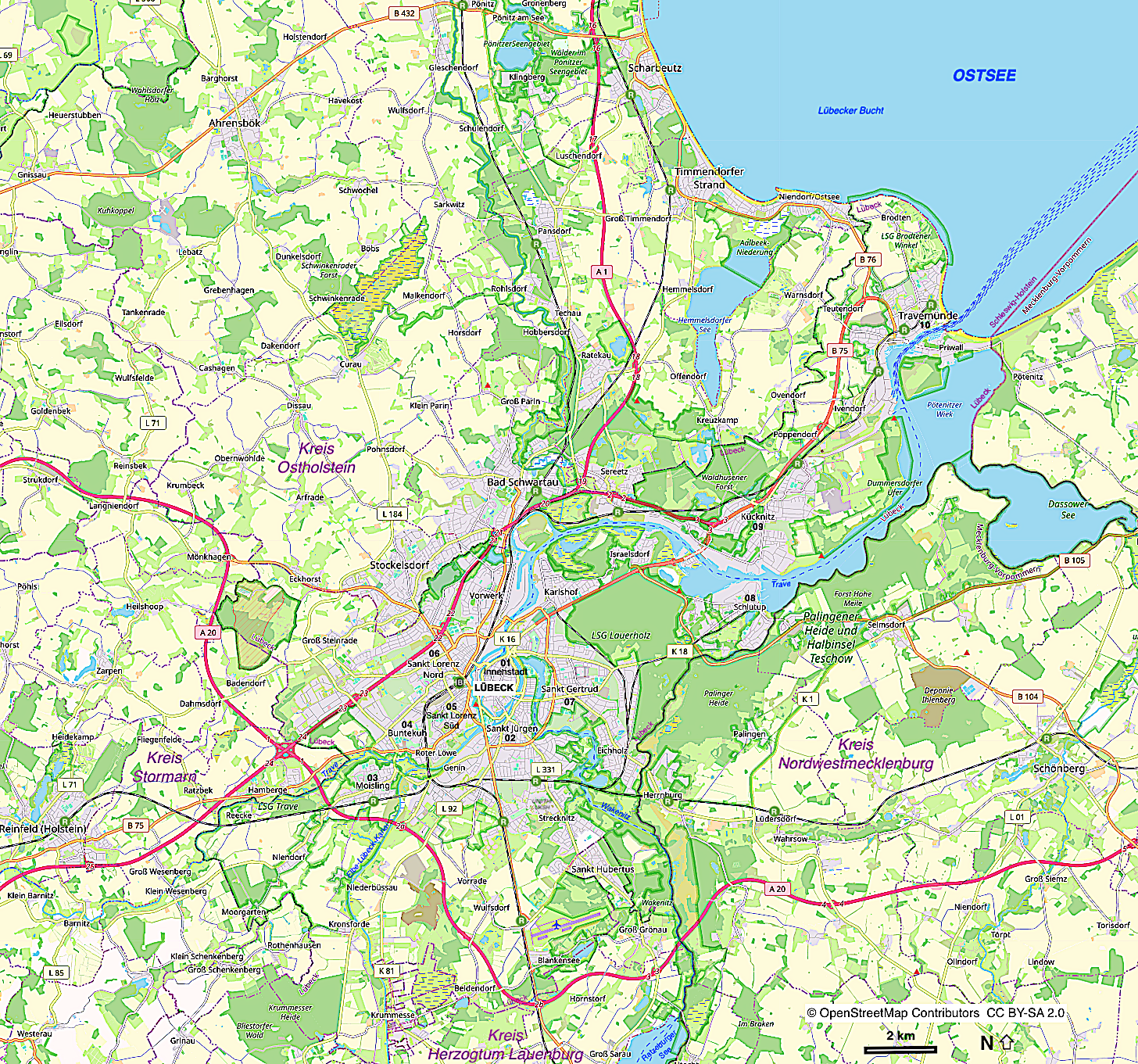
natural border 1

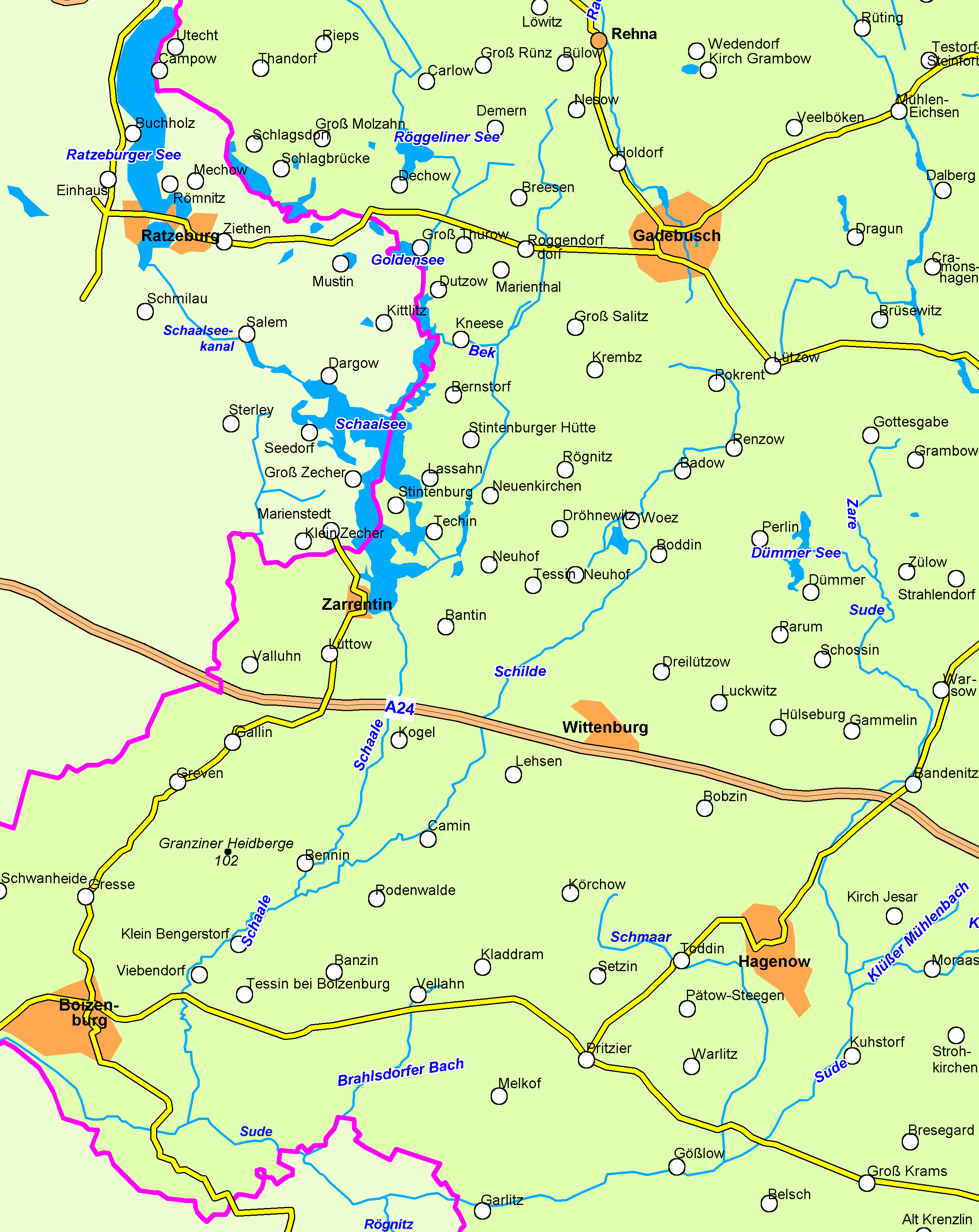
nat. border 2

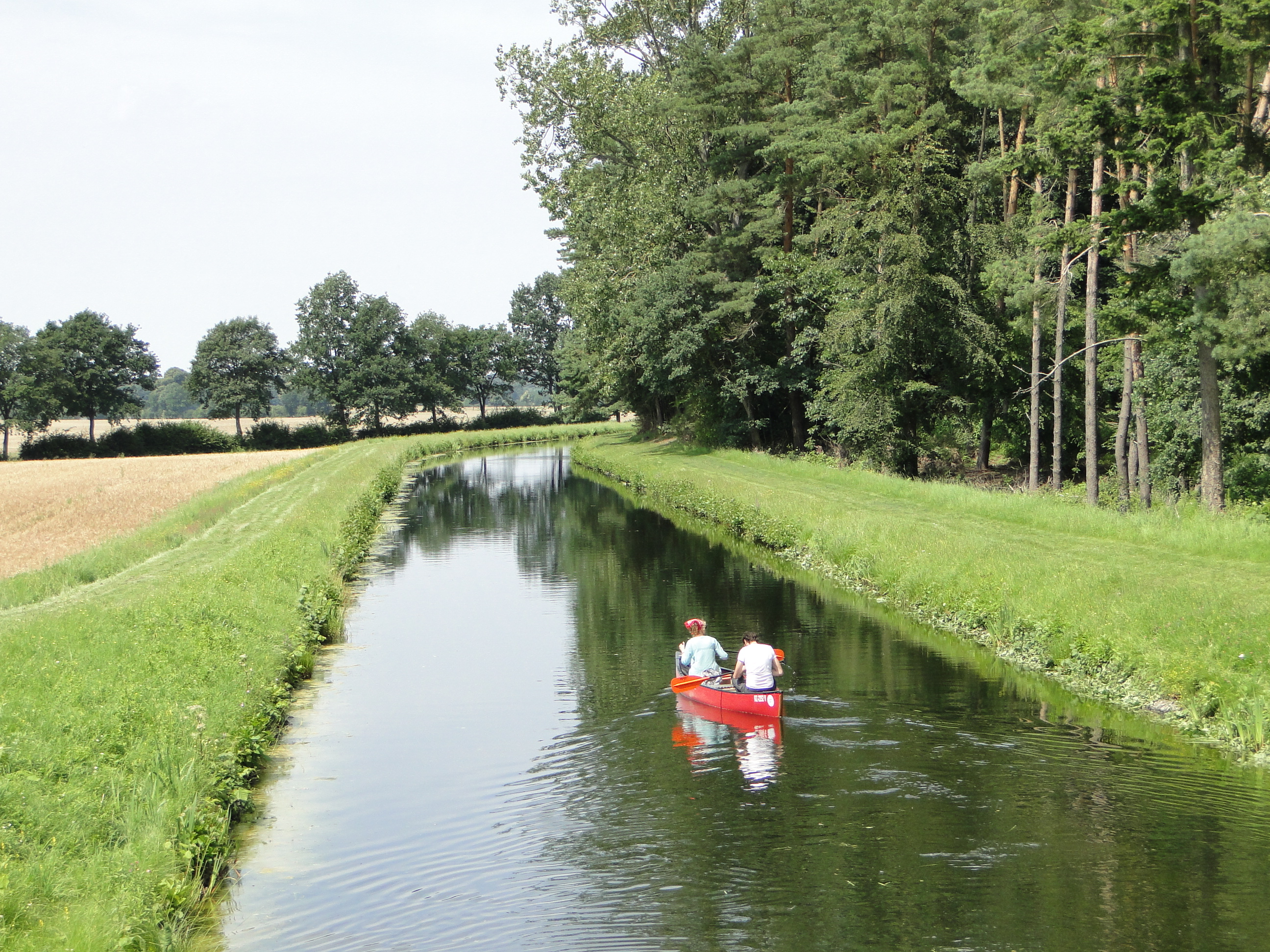
Schaalseekanal

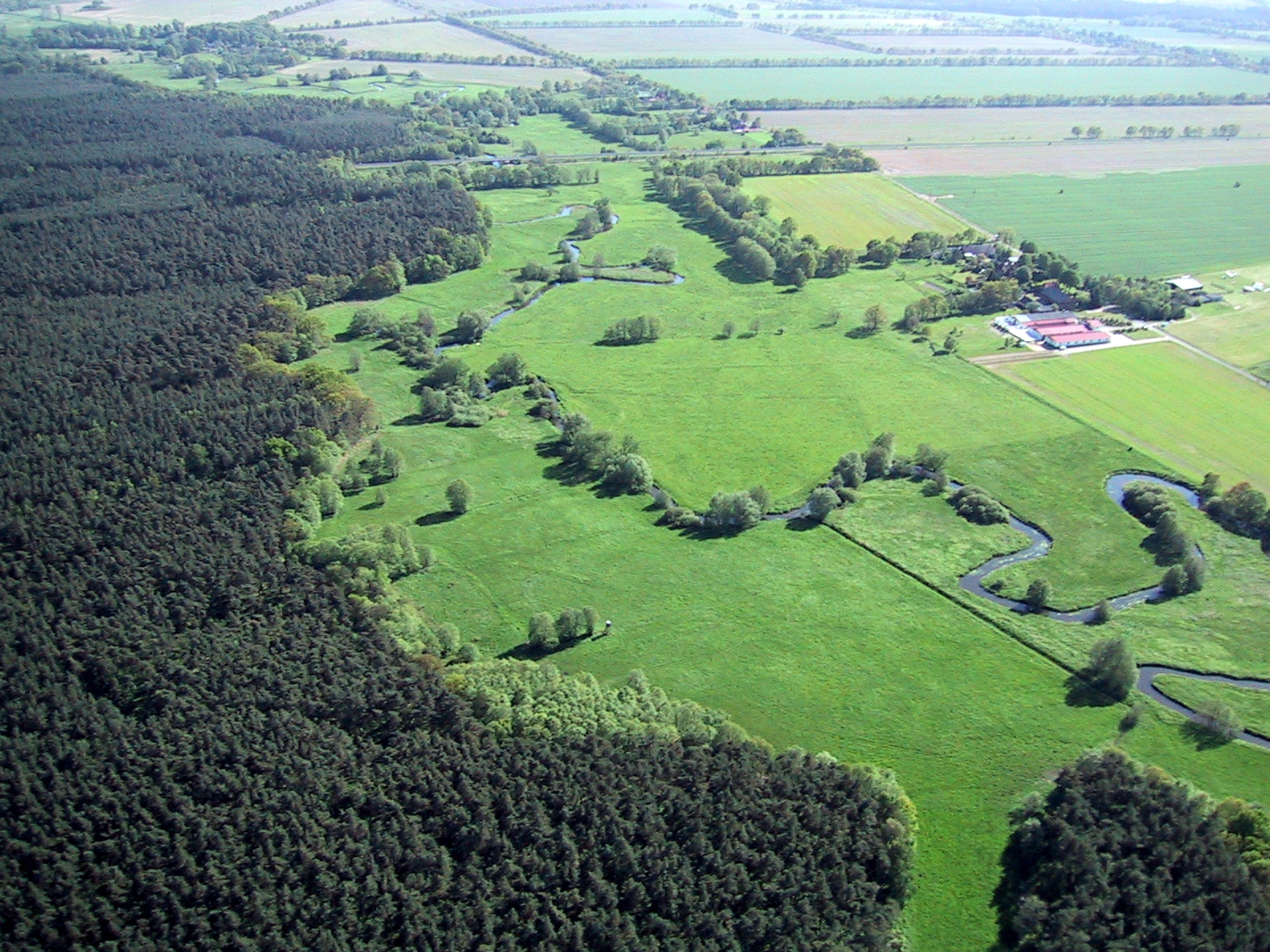
Schaale

The peninsula's land border in the southeast and south is constituted by a string of several rivers and lakes: from the mouth of the Trave at Lübeck-Travemünde up to the mouth of the Wakenitz into the Trave (in Lübeck), from there up the Wakenitz until its outflow from lake Ratzeburger See, then through lake Kleiner Küchensee to the mouth of the Schaalseekanal into lake Großer Küchensee, from there along the canal through lakes Salemer See, Pipersee and Phulsee to lake Schaalsee, on from Zarrentin am Schaalsee along the outflow of lake Schaalsee, the Schaale, until its mouth into the Sude at Teldau, then along the Sude until its confluence with the Elbe at Boizenburg, and further on along the Elbe, until the Geesthacht barrage east of Hamburg, where the tide-dependent estuary of the Elbe begins.

Travemünde→Trave→Wakenitz→Ratzeburger See→Kleiner Küchensee→Großer Küchensee→Schaalsee canal→Salemer See→Pipersee→Phulsee→Schaalsee→Schaale→Sude→Elbe at Boizenburg→beginning of the estuary of the Elbe at the Geesthacht barrage

=== Subregions (from south to north) ===
==== Lauenburg ====

Lauenburg is the southeasternmost area of Schleswig-Holstein. It exists administratively as the district of Herzogtum Lauenburg (Duchy of Lauenburg), the surface of which is equal to the territory of the former Duchy of Saxe-Lauenburg, which historically did not belong to Holstein. The Duchy of Lauenburg existed since 1296, and when it was absorbed by the Kingdom of Prussia and became part of the Prussian Province of Schleswig-Holstein in 1876, the new district was allowed to keep the name "duchy" in its name as a reminiscence to its ducal past, and today it is the only district in Germany with such a designation. The region is named for its former capital, the town of Lauenburg on the Elbe, but its seat is now at Ratzeburg. Lauenburg is crossed by the Elbe–Lübeck Canal, that connects the Elbe at Lauenburg to the Baltic at Lübeck, and there are over 50 lakes in the area, many of which are part of the Lauenburg Lakes Nature Park.

==== Hamburg ====
Hamburg is its own city-state and does not belong to Schleswig-Holstein. The northelbish districts of Hamburg that are on the Jutland peninsula are historically part of the region of Stormarn. The former border rivers of Stormarn are the Stör and Krückau in the northwest, the Trave and Bille in the east, and the Elbe in the south. There exists also a district of Stormarn northeast of Hamburg in Schleswig-Holstein. But this district does not cover the entire area of the historic region of Stormarn, and while those parts of Stormarn now lying in Schleswig-Holstein are nowadays considered parts of Holstein, the areas of Stormarn today in the city-state of Hamburg, are not.

==== Holstein ====
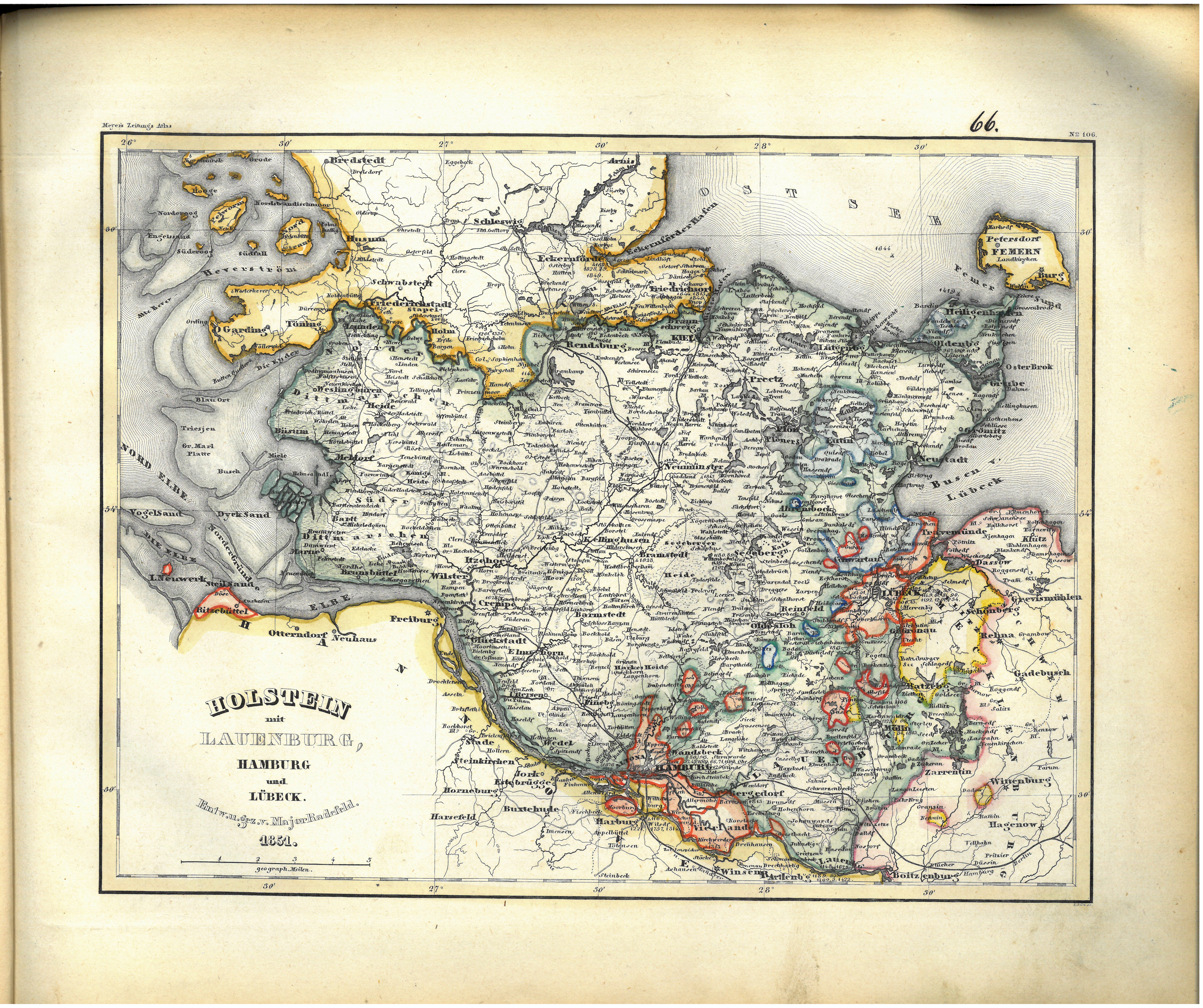
Holstein and Lauenburg

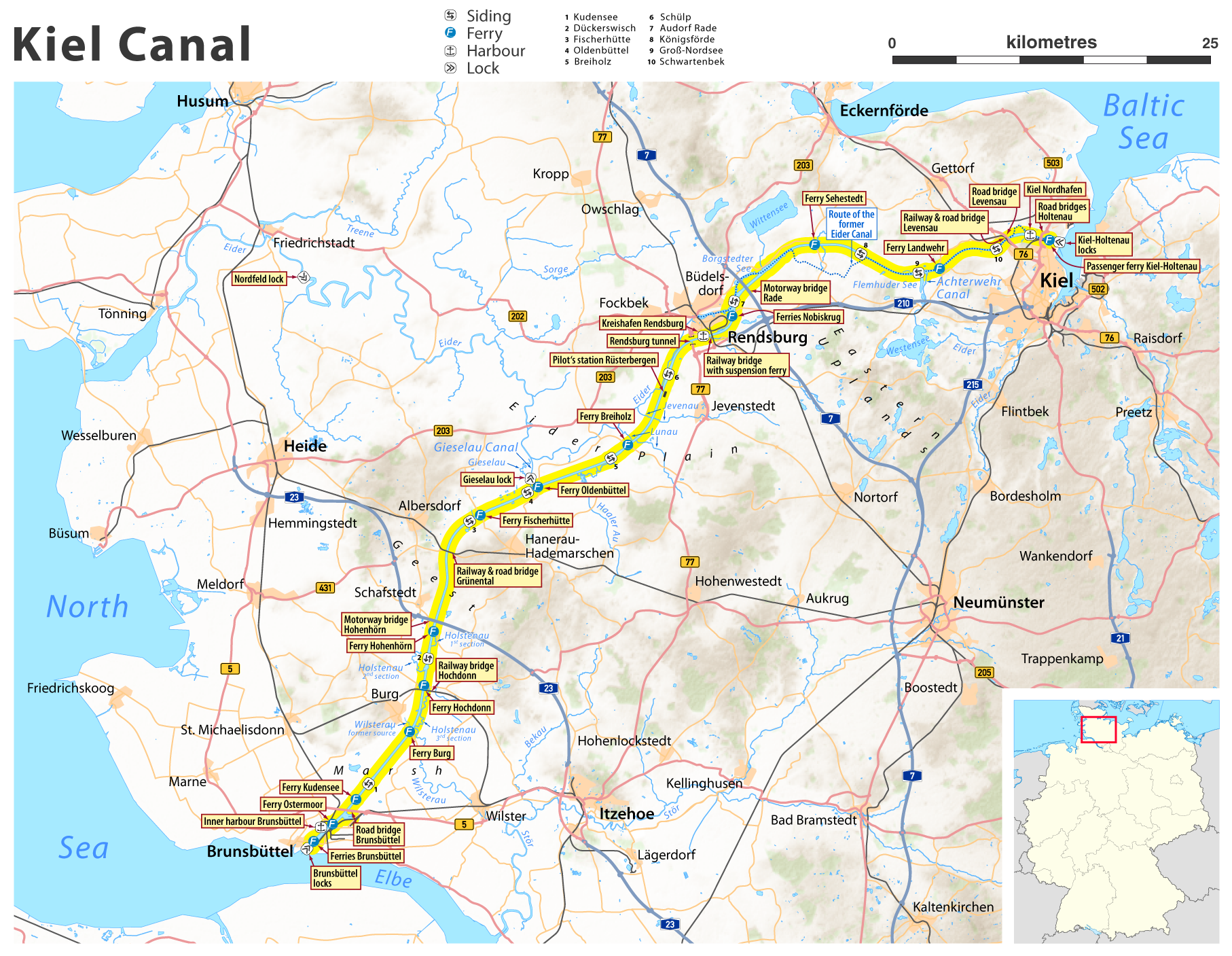
Kiel Canal

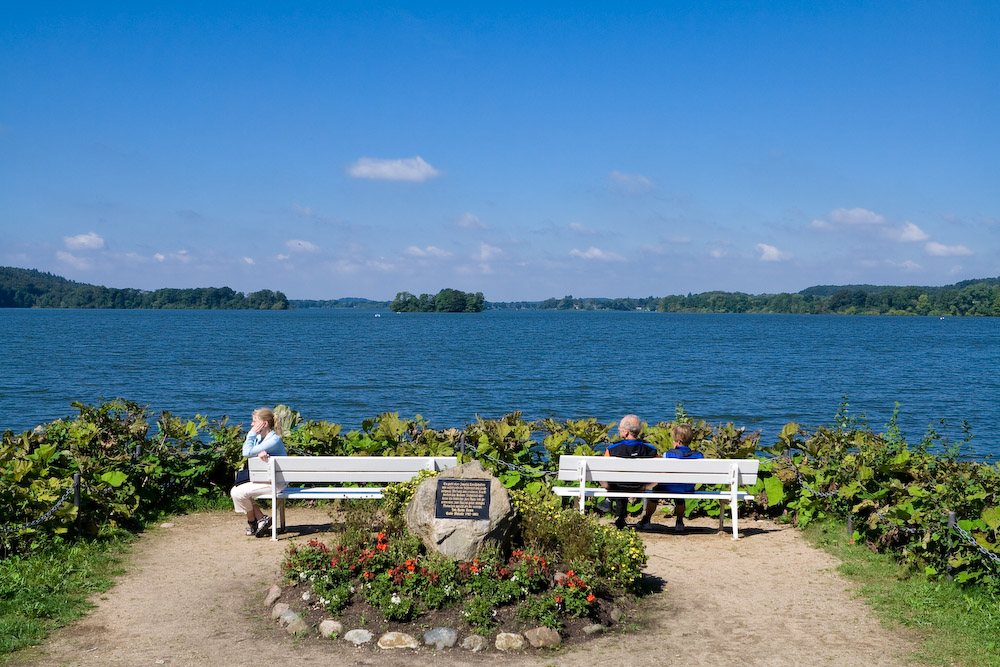
Dieksee

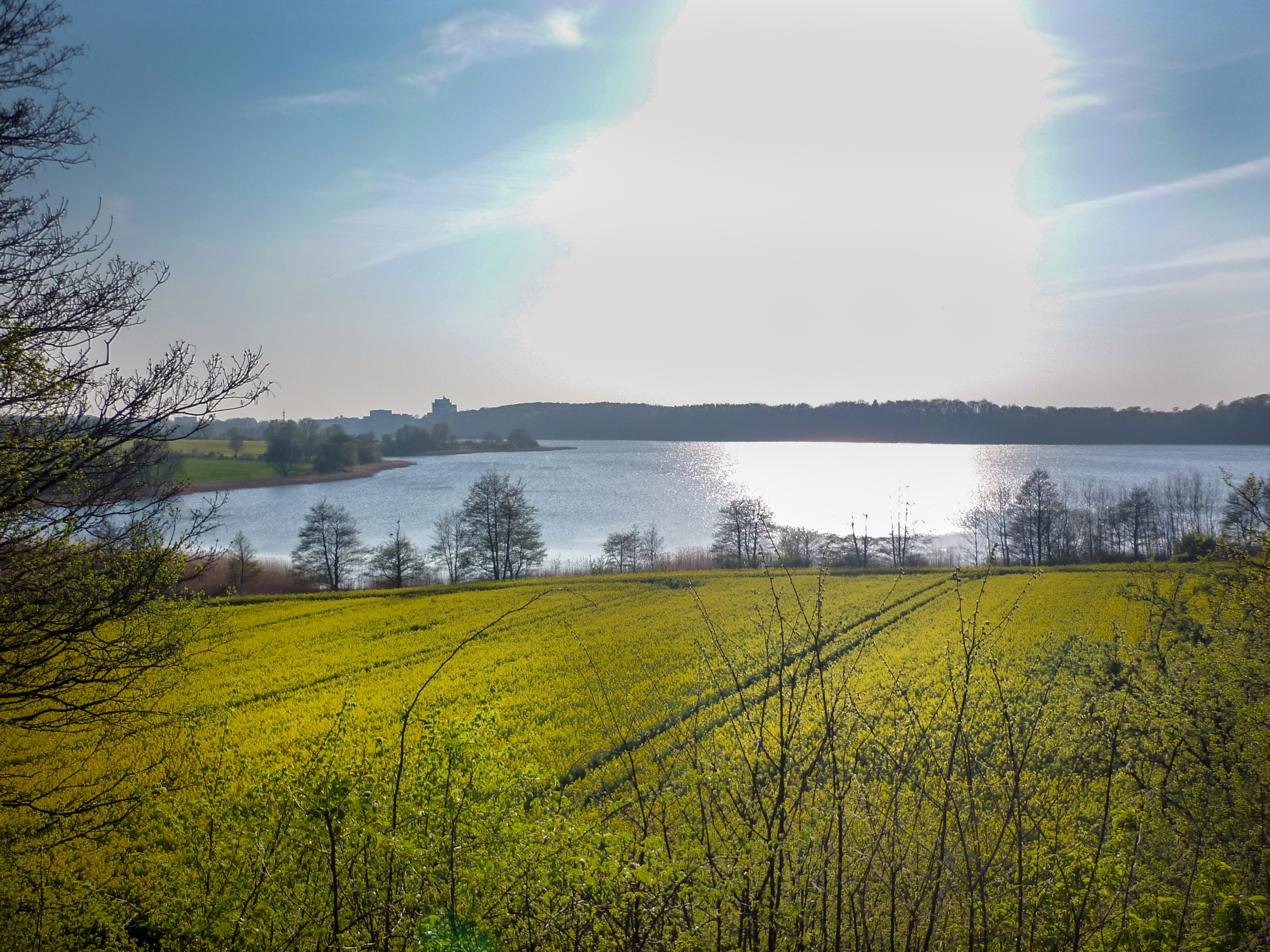
Segeberger See

The bulk of the southernmost areas of the Jutland peninsula belongs to Holstein, stretching from the Elbe in the south to the Eider in the north. Subregions of Holstein are Dithmarschen on the North Sea side, Stormarn at the centre, and Wagria on the Baltic side. There is an area in Holstein called Holstein Switzerland because of its comparable higher hills. The largest amount of lakes on the Jutland peninsula can be found in Holstein, the ten largest lakes being the Großer Plöner See (which is also the largest lake on the whole Jutland peninsula), Selenter See, Kellersee, Dieksee, Lanker See, Behler See, Postsee, Kleiner Plöner See, Großer Eutiner See, and the Stocksee. One of the world's most frequented artificial waterways, the Kiel Canal, runs through the Jutland peninsula in Holstein, connecting the North Sea at Brunsbüttel to the Baltic at Kiel-Holtenau. The Eider is the longest river of the Jutland peninsula. Holstein is one of the most populated subregions of the Jutland peninsula because of the densely populated area around Hamburg, which in large parts lies in Holstein.

==== Southern Schleswig ====
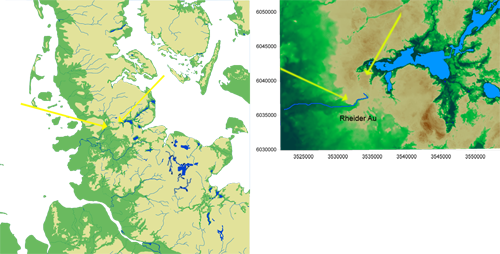
Course of the Danevirke through Southern Schleswig

Between the Eider and the Danish-German border stretches Southern Schleswig. Notable subregions of Southern Schleswig are the peninsula of Eiderstedt and North Frisia on the North Sea side, and the peninsulas of Danish Wahld, Schwansen, and Anglia on the Baltic side. There is a considerable North Frisian minority in North Frisia, and North Frisian is an official language in the region. In Anglia and Schwansen on the other hand, there exist indigenous Danish minorities, with Danish being the second official language there. The Danish Wahld once formed a border forest between Danish and Saxon settlements. A system of Danish fortifications, the Danevirke, runs through Southern Schleswig, overcoming the drainage divide between Baltic (Schlei) and North Sea (Rheider Au). At the Baltic end of the Danevirke is Hedeby, a former important Viking town.

==== Southern Jutland (Sønderjylland) ====
Between the Danish-German border and the Kongeå lies Southern Jutland (from 1970 to 2007 approximately the same as South Jutland County), historically also known as Northern Schleswig. Northern and Southern Schleswig once formed the territory of the former Duchy of Schleswig. The region is called Sønderjylland in Danish, this term was once regarded as synonymous to Slesvig (Schleswig).

==== Northern Jutland (Nørrejylland) ====
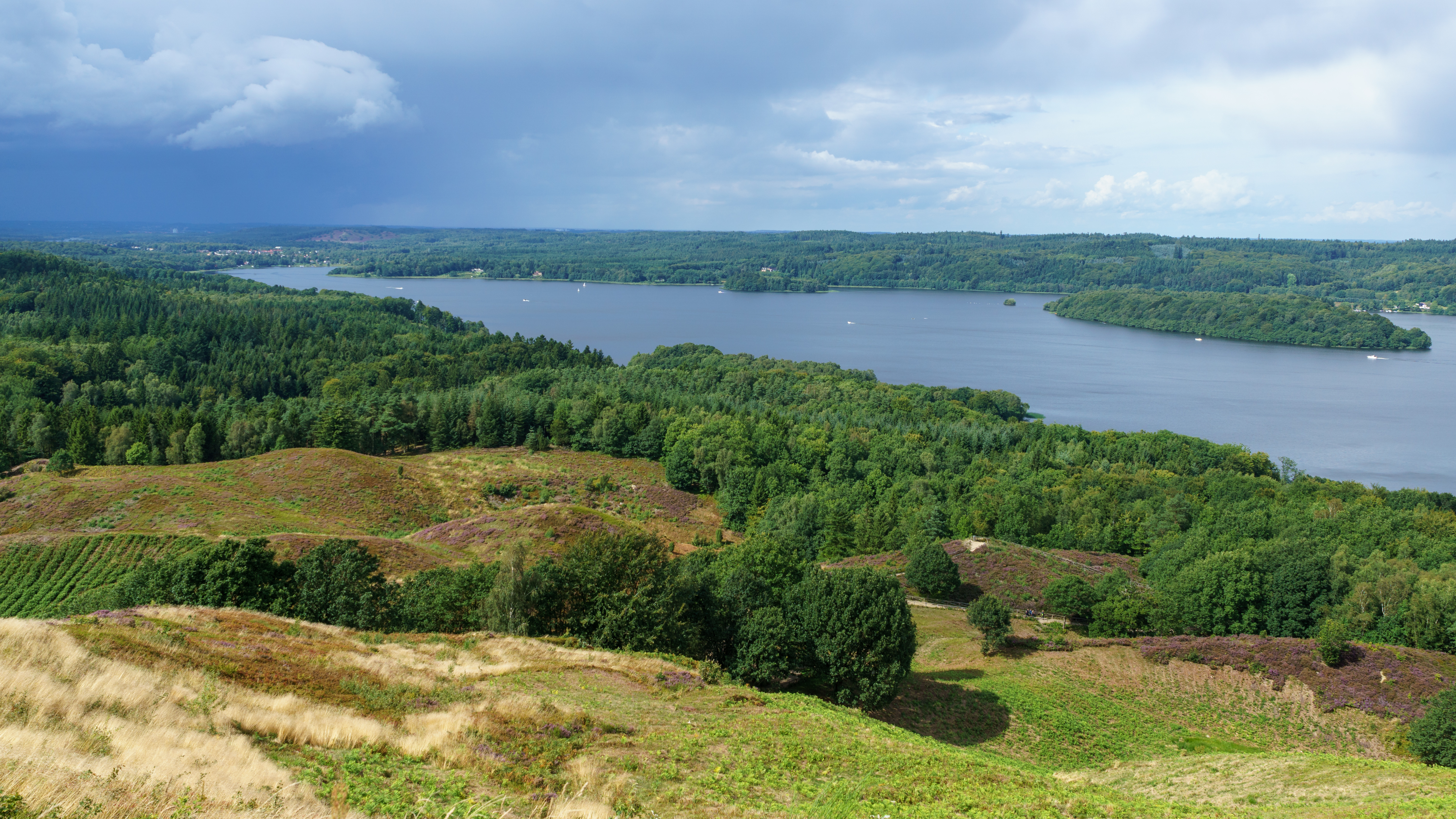
View over the Julsø in the Søhøjlandet from Himmelbjerget

Northern Jutland is the region between the Kongeå and Jutland's northernmost point, the Grenen spit. In Danish, it is called Nørrejylland, and also encompasses the North Jutlandic Island (Danish: Nørrejyske Ø or Vendsyssel-Thy). Northern Jutland is traditionally subdivided into South Jutland (Sydjylland), West Jutland (Vestjylland), East Jutland (Østjylland), and North Jutland (Nordjylland). More recent is the designation Central Jutland (Midtjylland) for parts of traditionally West and East Jutish areas. Subregions of Northern Jutland include the peninsulas of Djursland with Mols, and Salling. Also in Northern Jutland is the Søhøjlandet, which is the highest elevated Danish region, and at the same time, the region with the highest density of lakes in Denmark. Denmark's longest river, the Gudenå, flows through Northern Jutland.

===== South Jutland (Sydjylland) =====
South Jutland (Sydjylland) is the southernmost part of Northern Jutland. It is not to be confused with Southern Jutland (Sønderjylland), which is adjacent to South Jutland in the south. South Jutland stretches between Sønderjylland in the south, and the border between the two administrative regions of Southern Denmark and Central Jutland in the north.

===== West Jutland (Vestjylland) =====
West Jutland (Vestjylland) is the central western part of Northern Jutland. It lies between Blåvandshuk in the south, and the Nissum Bredning in the north. It is north of South Jutland and west of East Jutland.

===== East Jutland (Østjylland) =====
East Jutland (Østjylland) is the central eastern part of Northern Jutland. It lies between Skærbæk on the Kolding Fjord in the south, and the end of the Mariager Fjord in the north. Aarhus, the largest city completely on the Jutland peninsula, is in East Jutland.

===== Central Jutland (Midtjylland) =====
The concept of Central Jutland (Midtjylland) is of recent date, since a few decades ago it was usual to divide Northern Jutland into the traditional East and West Jutland (in addition to North and South Jutland), only. However, the term has been used in and around Viborg, so that the people of Viborg could differentiate themselves from the populations to the east and west. The majority of what is today called Central Jutland is actually the traditional West Jutish culture and dialect area, i.e. Herning, Skive, Ikast, and Brande. By contrast, Silkeborg and the other areas east of the Jutish ridge are traditionally part of the East Jutish cultural area. A new meaning of Central Jutland is the entire area between North and South Jutland, corresponding roughly to the Central Jutland Region.

===== North Jutland (Nordjylland) =====
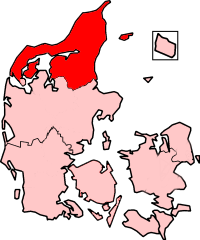
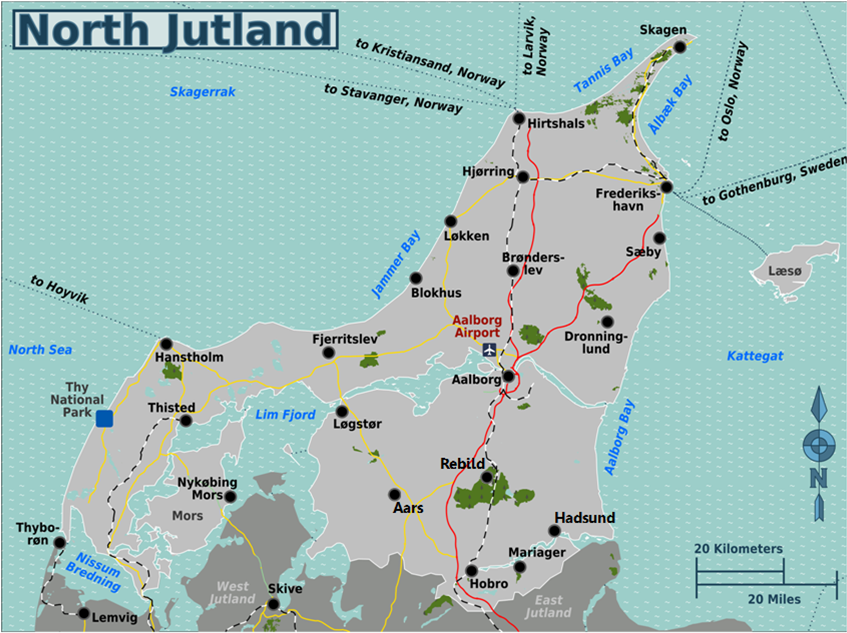

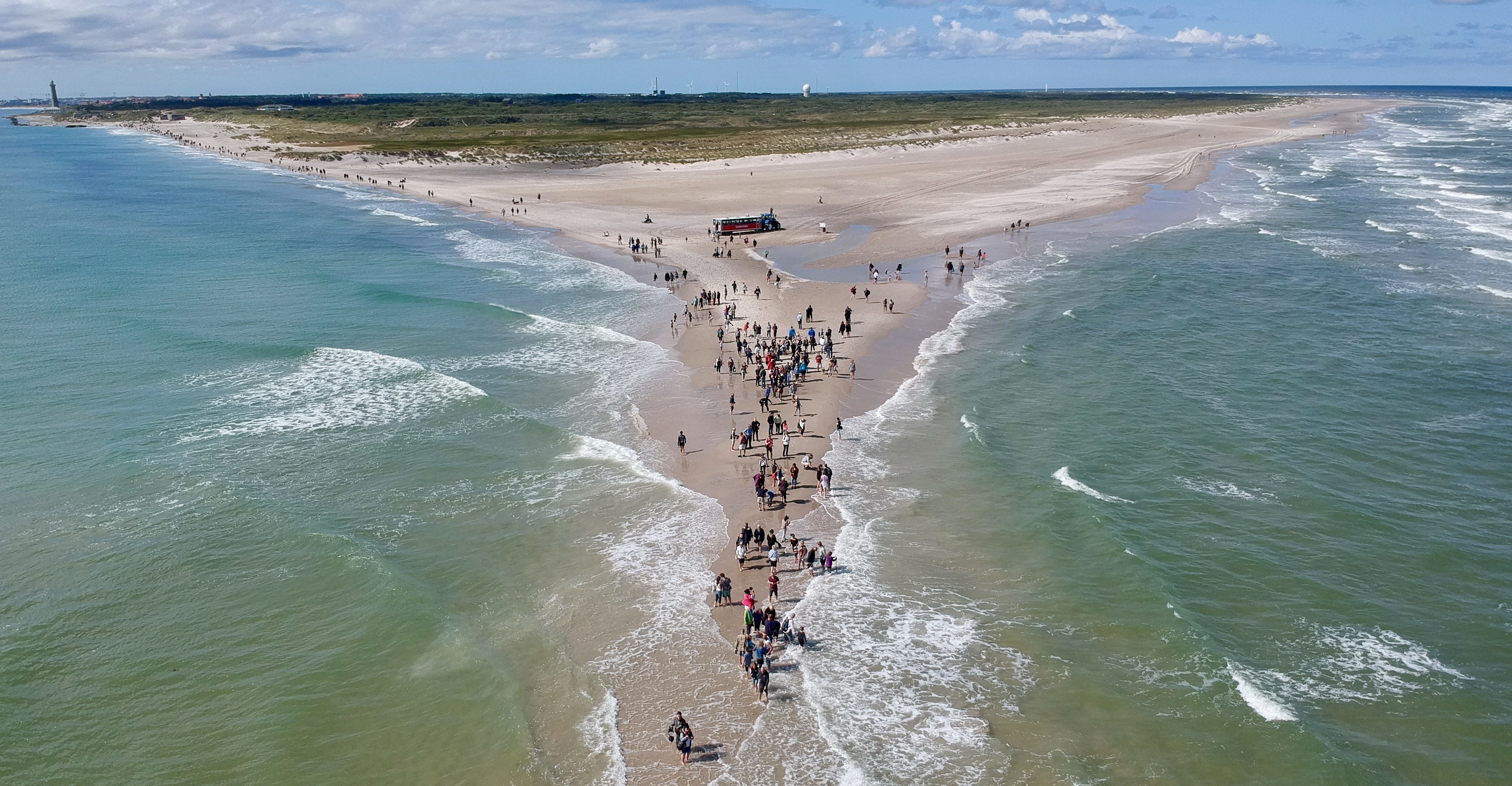
The Grenen spit, northernmost tip of the Jutland peninsula

While the term Northern Jutland (Danish: Nørrejylland) refers to the whole region between Kongeå and Grenen, North Jutland (Danish: Nordjylland) only refers to the northernmost part of Northern Jutland, and encompasses the largest part of Himmerland, the northernmost part of Crown Jutland (Kronjylland), the island of Mors (Morsø), and Jutland north of the Limfjord (the North Jutlandic Island, which is subdivided into the regions of Thy, Hanherred, and Vendsyssel, the northernmost region of Jutland and Denmark). Nordjylland is congruent with the North Jutland Region (Region Nordjylland).

==== Offshore Islands ====
The largest Kattegat and Baltic islands off Jutland are Funen, Als, Læsø, Samsø, and Anholt in Denmark, as well as Fehmarn in Germany.

The islands of Læsø, Anholt, and Samsø in the Kattegat, and Als at the rim of the Baltic Sea, are administratively and historically tied to Jutland, although the latter two are also regarded as traditional districts of their own. Inhabitants of Als, known as Alsinger, would agree to be South Jutlanders, but not necessarily Jutlanders.

The largest North Sea islands off the Jutish coast are the Danish Wadden Sea Islands including Rømø, Fanø, and Mandø in Denmark, and the North Frisian Islands including Sylt, Föhr, Amrum and Pellworm in Germany. On the German islands, some North Frisian dialects are still in use.

=== Human geography ===
Administratively, the Jutland peninsula belongs to three German states and three Danish regions:

- most of the city-state of Hamburg except the boroughs south of the Elbe
- almost the entire German state of Schleswig-Holstein except some parts of the Herzogtum Lauenburg district east of Ratzeburger See, de:Schaalseekanal, and Schaalsee
- a very small part west of the Schaale and north of the Sude belongs to the district of Ludwigslust-Parchim in the state of Mecklenburg-Vorpommern
- the Region of Southern Denmark (Region Syddanmark) except Funen and the islands surrounding it
- the Central Jutland Region (Region Midtjylland)
- the North Jutland Region (Region Nordjylland)

==== Largest cities ====
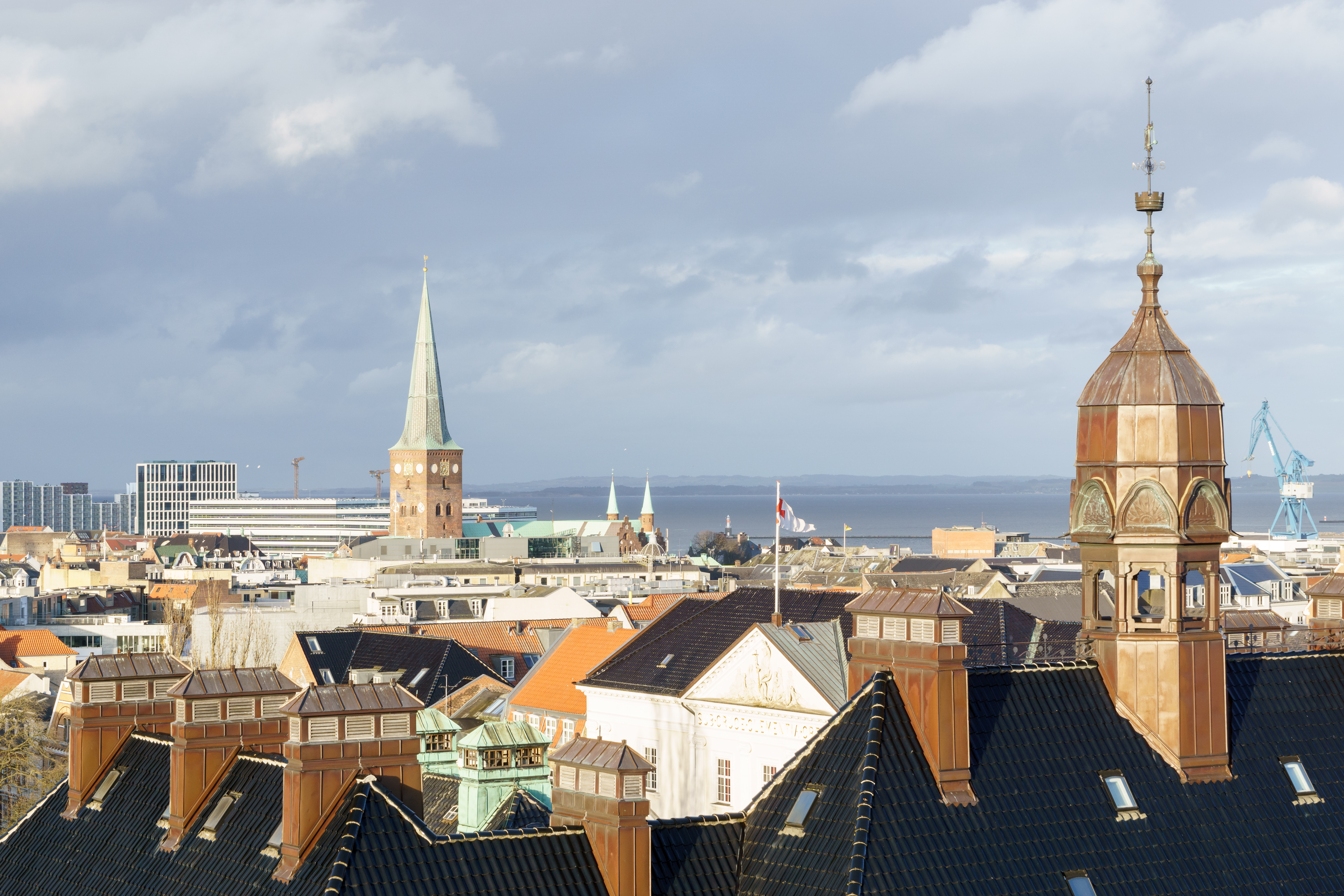
Aarhus is the largest city completely on the Jutland peninsula and the second-largest city in Denmark.

The ten largest cities on the Jutland peninsula are:

1. Hamburg (boroughs north of the Elbe) 1,667,035
2. Aarhus 290,598
3. Kiel 247,717
4. Lübeck 218,095
5. Aalborg 120,914
6. Flensburg 92,550
7. Norderstedt 81,880
8. Neumünster 79,502
9. Esbjerg 71,921
10. Randers 64,057

===== Largest cities in the Danish part =====
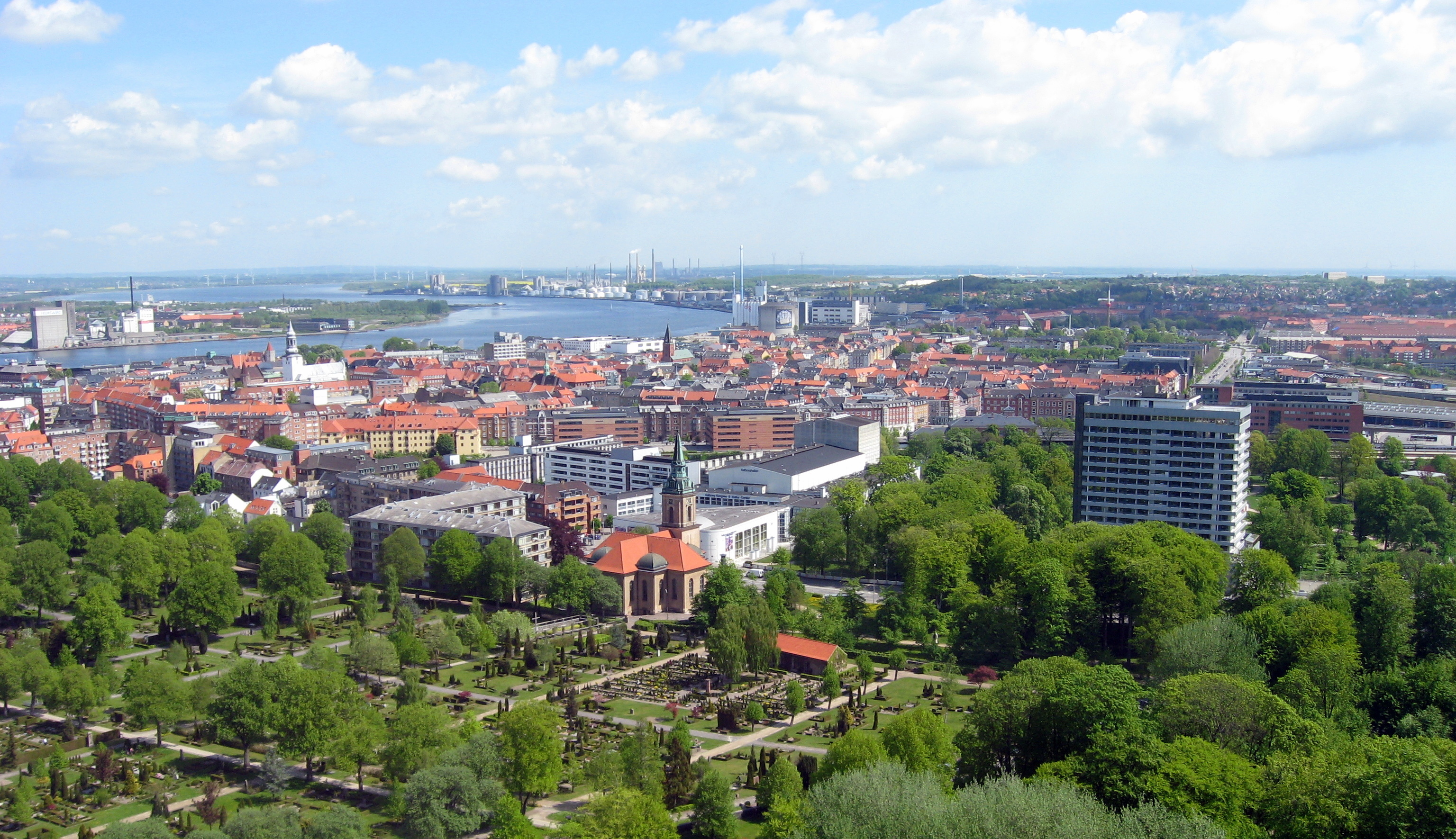
Aalborg is the largest city in North Jutland. It is the fourth-largest city of Denmark and the northernmost large Danish city. It is on the mainland side of the Limfjord, opposite the town of Nørresundby in Vendsyssel.

1. Aarhus 301,049
2. Aalborg 121,878
3. Esbjerg 71,554
4. Randers 64,511
5. Horsens 64,418
6. Kolding 63,645
7. Vejle 62,011
8. Silkeborg 52,571
9. Herning 51,782
10. Fredericia 41,543

Aarhus, Silkeborg, Billund, Randers, Kolding, Horsens, Vejle, Fredericia and Haderslev, along with a number of smaller towns, make up the suggested East Jutland metropolitan area, which is more densely populated than the rest of Jutland, although far from forming one consistent city.

===== Largest cities in the German part =====
The Hamburg boroughs north of the Elbe are on the Jutland peninsula.

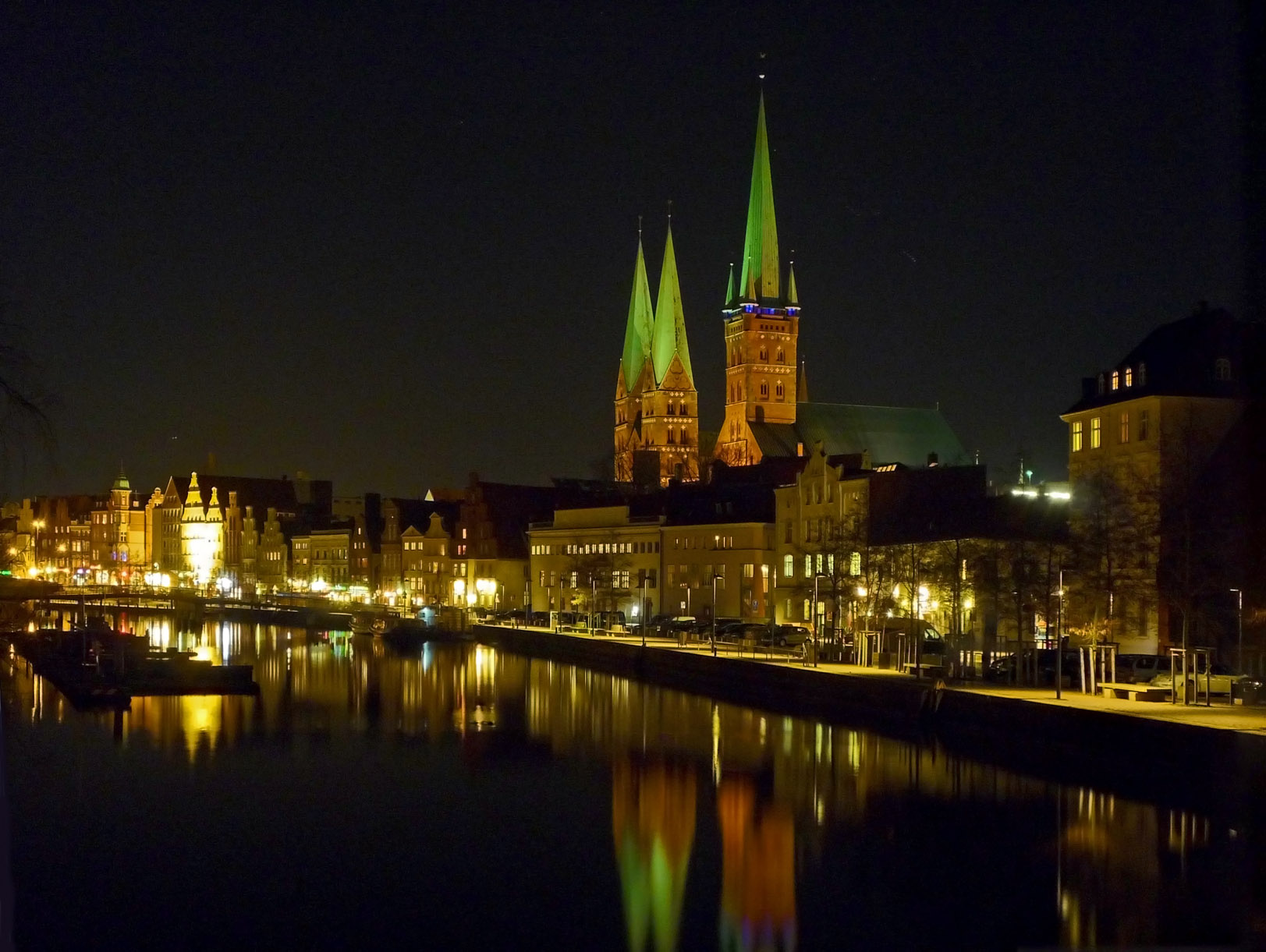
Lübeck is the fourth-largest city on the Jutland Peninsula.

1. Hamburg (boroughs north of the Elbe) 1,667,035
- Altona 280,034, Bergedorf 132,901, Eimsbüttel 274,901, Hamburg-Nord 322,564, Wandsbek 453,086, and the quarters of Hamburg-Mitte north of the Elbe:
  - Altstadt 3,182, Billbrook 1,791, Billstedt 71,789, Borgfelde 8,569, HafenCity 6,950, Hamm 10,189, Hammerbrook 5,990, Horn 38,425, Neustadt 12,649, Rothenburgsort 9,641, St. Georg 12,318, St. Pauli 22,056
1. Kiel 247,717
2. Lübeck 218,095
3. Flensburg 92,550
4. Norderstedt 81,880
5. Neumünster 79,502
6. Elmshorn 50,772
7. Pinneberg 44,279
8. Wedel 34,538
9. Ahrensburg 34,509

== Geology ==
Geologically, the Mid Jutland Region and the North Jutland Region as well as the Capital Region of Denmark are located in the north of Denmark which is rising because of post-glacial rebound.

Some circular depressions in Jutland may be remnants of collapsed pingos that developed during the Last Ice Age. The surface of southwest Jutland is dominated by sediments of the Saale glaciation, while deposits of the Weichselian glaciation form the surface layers in the northern and eastern Denmark. During the Saalian ice age, the ice sheet again reached Central Europe. Signs of another three glacial advances have been found in Denmark dating back to this period. The Saalian period left its mark on the landscape in West Jutland in the form of the so-called "hill islands" surrounded by melt water plains from the last ice age, the Weichselian period.

== History ==
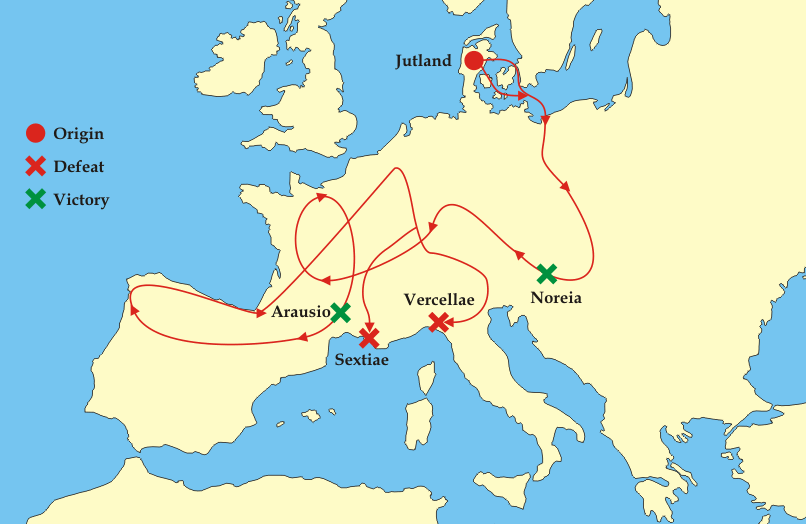
Military stratagem in the maneuver against the Romans by Cimbri and Teutons c. 100 B.C.

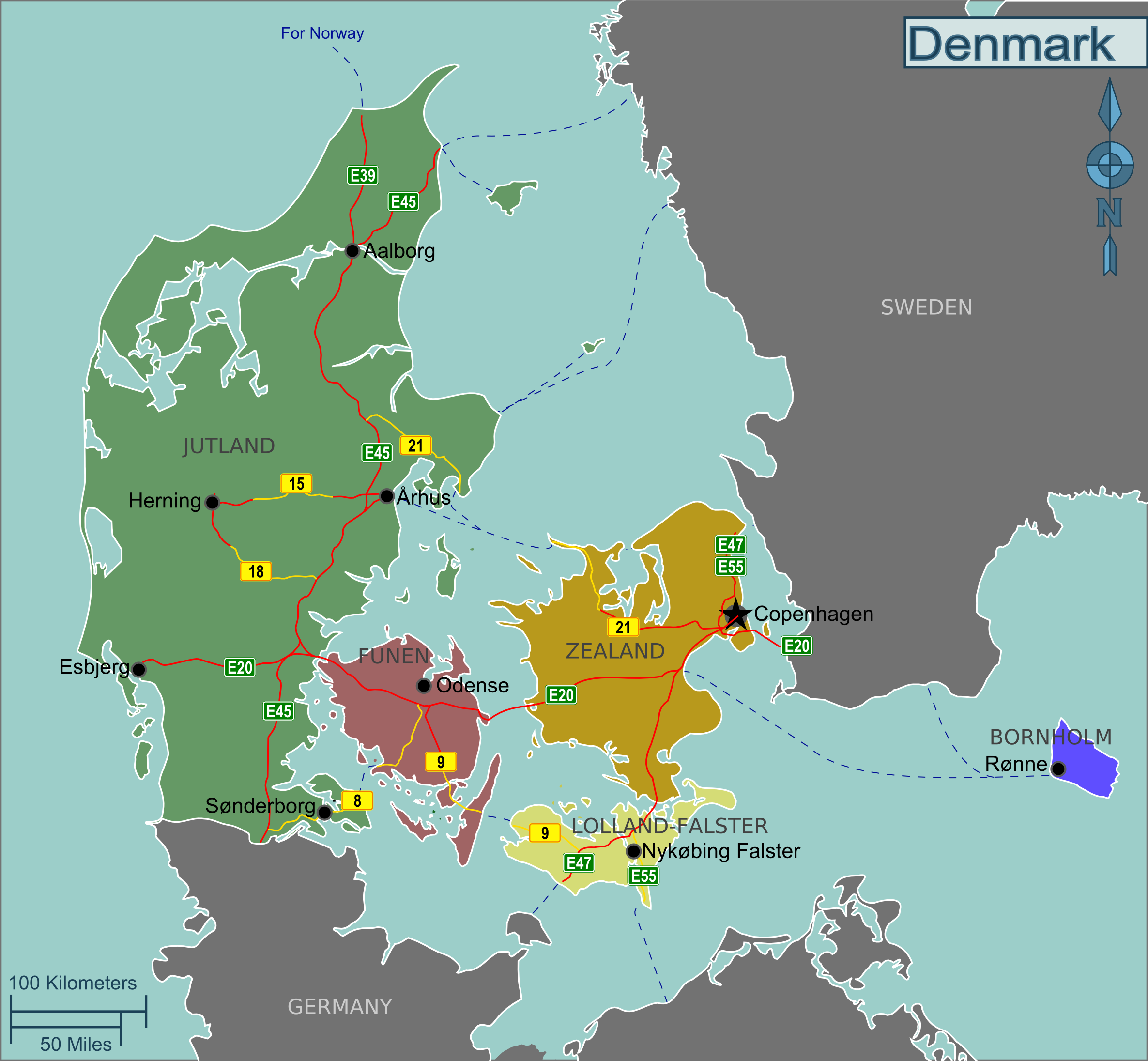
Regions of Denmark; Jutland is highlighted in green.

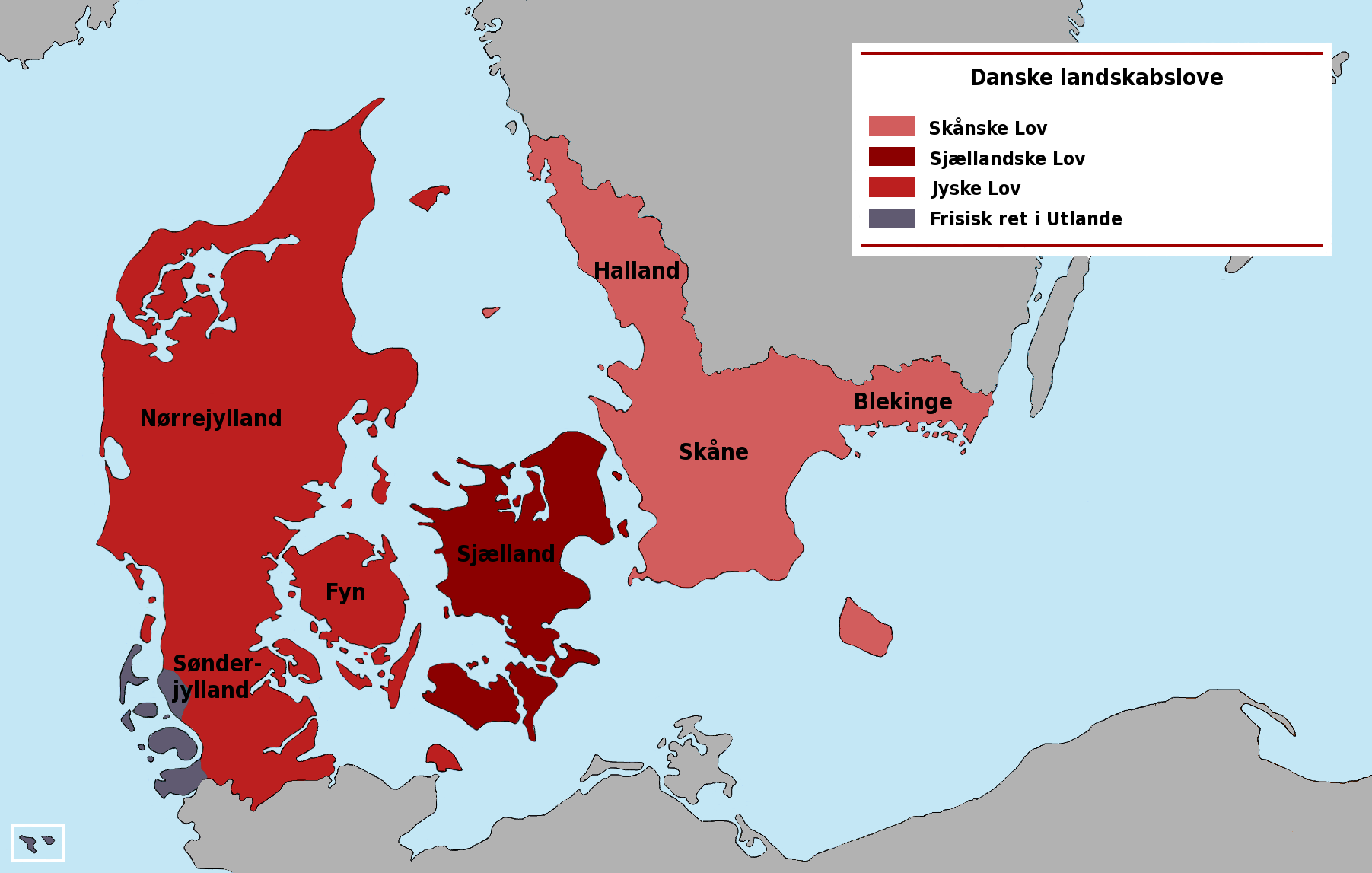
The old Code of Jutland (before 1658)

Jutland has historically been one of the three lands of Denmark, the other two being Scania and Zealand. Before that, according to Ptolemy, Jutland or the Cimbric Chersonese was the home of Teutons, Cimbri, and Charudes.

Many Angles, Saxons and Jutes migrated from Continental Europe to Great Britain starting around 450 AD. The Angles gave their name to the new emerging kingdoms called England (i.e., "Angle-land"). The Kingdom of Kent in south east England is associated with Jutish origins and migration, also attributed by Bede in the Ecclesiastical History. This is also supported by the archaeological record, with extensive Jutish finds in Kent from the fifth and sixth centuries.

Saxons and Frisii migrated to the region in the early part of the Christian era. To protect themselves from invasion by the Christian Frankish emperors, beginning in the 5th century, the pagan Danes initiated the Danevirke, a defensive wall stretching from present-day Schleswig and inland halfway across the Jutland Peninsula.

The pagan Saxons inhabited the southernmost part of the peninsula, adjoining the Baltic Sea, until the Saxon Wars in 772–804 in the Nordic Iron Age, when Charlemagne violently subdued them and forced them to be Christianised. Old Saxony was politically absorbed into the Carolingian Empire and Abodrites (or Obotrites), a group of Wendish Slavs who pledged allegiance to Charlemagne and who had for the most part converted to Christianity, were moved into the area to populate it. Old Saxony was later referred to as Holstein.

In medieval times, Jutland was regulated by the Law Code of Jutland (Jyske Lov). This civic code covered the Danish part of the Jutland Peninsula, i.e., north of the Eider (river), Funen as well as Fehmarn. Part of this area is now in Germany.

During the industrialisation of the 1800s, Jutland experienced a large and accelerating urbanisation and many people from the countryside chose to emigrate. Among the reasons was a high and accelerating population growth; in the course of the century, the Danish population grew two and a half times to about 2.5 million in 1901, with a million people added in the last part of the 1800s. This growth was not caused by an increase in the fertility rate, but by better nutrition, sanitation, hygiene, and health care services. More children survived, and people lived longer and healthier lives. Combined with falling grain prices on the international markets because of the Long Depression, and better opportunities in the cities due to an increasing industrialisation, many people in the countryside relocated to larger towns or emigrated. In the later half of the century, around 300,000 Danes, mainly unskilled labourers from rural areas, emigrated to the US or Canada. This amounted to more than 10% of the then total population, but some areas had an even higher emigration rate.

The population of Jutland in 1840 was 548,698 inhabitants. In 1850, Jutland's largest towns, namely Aalborg, Aarhus and Randers, had no more than about 8,000 inhabitants each; by 1901, Aarhus had grown to 51,800 citizens.

To speed transit between the Baltic and the North Sea, canals were built across the Jutland Peninsula, including the Eider Canal in the late 18th century, and the Kiel Canal, completed in 1895 and still in use.

In 1825, a severe North Sea storm on the west coast of Jutland breached the isthmus of Agger Tange in the Limfjord area, separating the northern part of Jutland from the mainland and effectively creating the North Jutlandic Island. The storm breach of Agger Tange created the Agger Channel, and another storm in 1862 created the Thyborøn Channel close by. The channels made it possible for ships to shortcut the Skagerrak Sea. The Agger Channel closed up again over the years, due to natural siltation, but the Thyborøn Channel widened and was fortified and secured in 1875.

=== World War I and Battle of Jutland ===
Denmark was neutral during the First World War. However, an estimated 5,000 Danes living in North Slesvig were killed serving in the German army. The 1916 Battle of Jutland was fought in the North Sea west of Jutland.

=== World War II ===
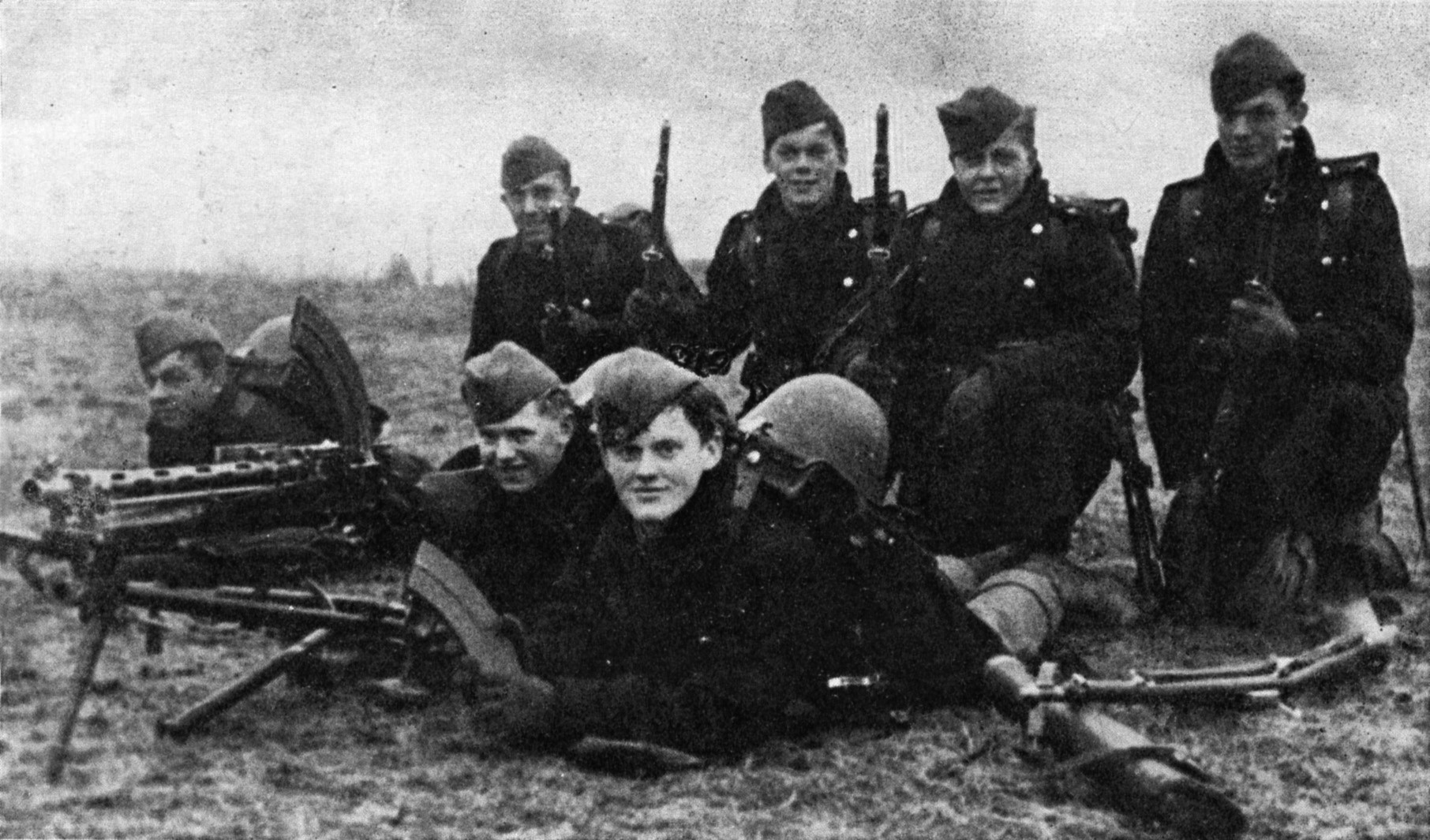
Danish troops at Bredevad, 10 km north of the border, on the morning of the Nazi invasion. Two of these soldiers were killed in action.

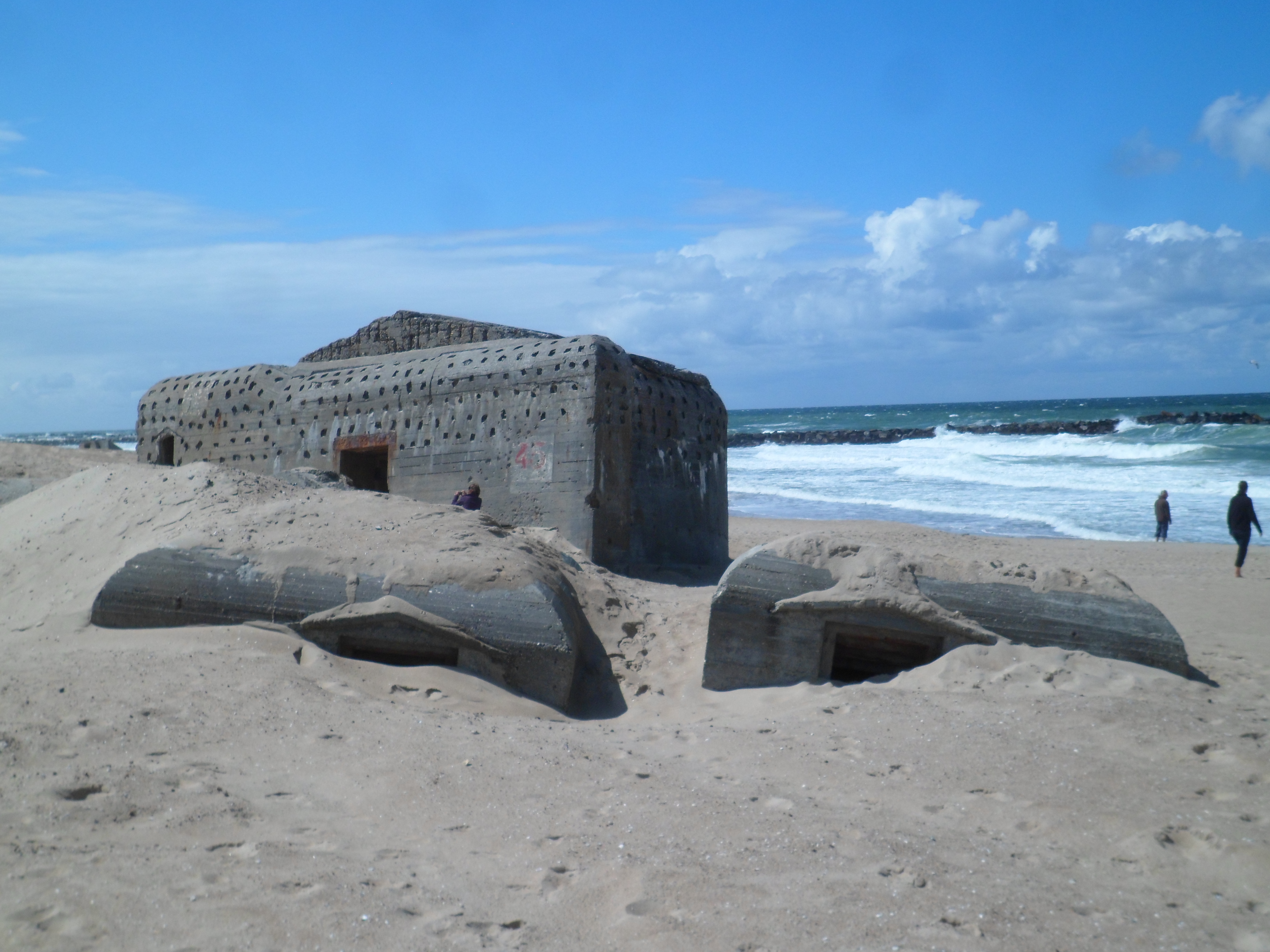
Bunker remnants from WWII in Thyborøn. German fortifications remain along the entire west coast of Jutland.

Denmark had declared itself neutral, but was invaded and occupied by Nazi Germany within a few hours on 9 April 1940. Scattered fighting took place in South Jutland and in Copenhagen. Sixteen Danish soldiers were killed.

Some months before the invasion, Germany had considered only occupying the northern tip of Jutland with Aalborg airfield, but Jutland as a whole was soon regarded as of high strategic importance. Work commenced on extending the Atlantic Wall along the entire west coast of the peninsula. Its task was to resist a potential allied attack on Germany by landing on the west coast of Jutland. The Hanstholm Fortress at the northwestern promontory of Jutland became the largest fortification of Northern Europe. The local villagers were evacuated to Hirtshals. Coastal areas of Jutland were declared a military zone where Danish citizens were required to carry identity cards, and access was regulated.

The small Danish airfield of Aalborg was seized as one of the first objects in the invasion by German paratroopers. The airfield was significantly expanded by the Germans in order to secure their traffic to Norway, and more airfields were built. Danish contractors and 50,000–100,000 workers were hired to fulfill the German projects. The alternative for workers was to be unemployed or sent to work in Germany. The fortifications have been estimated to be the largest construction project ever performed in Denmark at a cost of then 10 billion kroner, or 300-400 billion DKK today (45-60 billion USD or 40-54 billion euro in 2019). The Danish National Bank was forced to cover most of the cost. After the war, the remaining German prisoners of war were recruited to perform extensive mine clearance of 1.4 million mines along the coast.

Many of the seaside bunkers from World War II are still present at the west coast. Several of the fortifications in Denmark have been turned into museums, including Tirpitz Museum in Blåvand, Bunkermuseum Hanstholm, and Hirtshals Bunkermuseum.

In Southern Jutland, parts of the German minority openly sided with Germany and volunteered for German military service. While some Danes initially feared a border revision, the German occupational force did not pursue the issue. In a judicial aftermath after the end of the war, many members of the German minority were convicted, and German schools were confiscated by Danish authorities. There were some instances of Danish mob attacks against German-minded citizens. In December 1945, the remaining part of the German minority issued a declaration of loyalty to Denmark and democracy, renouncing any demands for a border revision.

== Culture ==
Up until the industrialisation of the 19th century, most people in Jutland lived a rural life as farmers and fishers. Farming and herding have formed a significant part of the culture since the late Neolithic Stone Age, and fishing ever since humans first populated the peninsula after the last Ice Age, some 12,000 years ago.

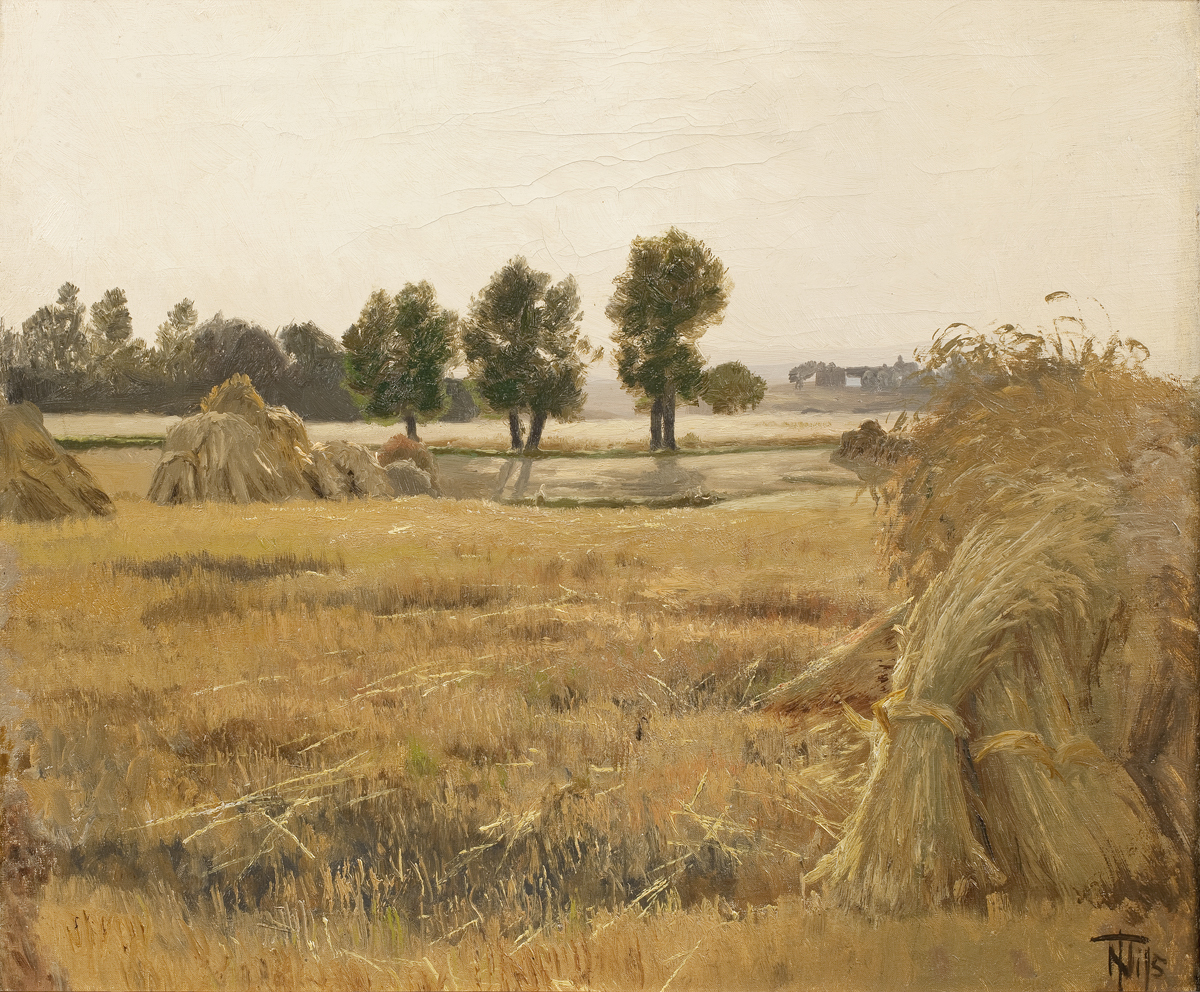
Art tied to Jutland specifically, in particular paintings and literature, boomed during the industrialisation in the later half of the 1800s and the beginning of the 1900s. Thorvald Niss, part of Skagen Painters collective.

The local culture of Jutland commoners before industrial times was not described in much detail by contemporary texts. It was generally viewed with contempt by the Danish cultural elite in Copenhagen who perceived it as uncultivated, misguided or useless.

While the peasantry of eastern Denmark was dominated by the upper feudal class, manifested in large estates owned by families of noble birth and an increasingly subdued class of peasant tenants, the farmers of Western Jutland were mostly free owners of their own land or leasing it from the Crown, although under frugal conditions. Most of the less fertile and sparsely populated land of Western Jutland was never feudalised. East Jutland was more similar to Eastern Denmark in this respect. The north–south ridge forming the border between the fertile eastern hills and sandy western plains has been a significant cultural border until this day, also reflected in differences between the West and East Jutlandic dialect.

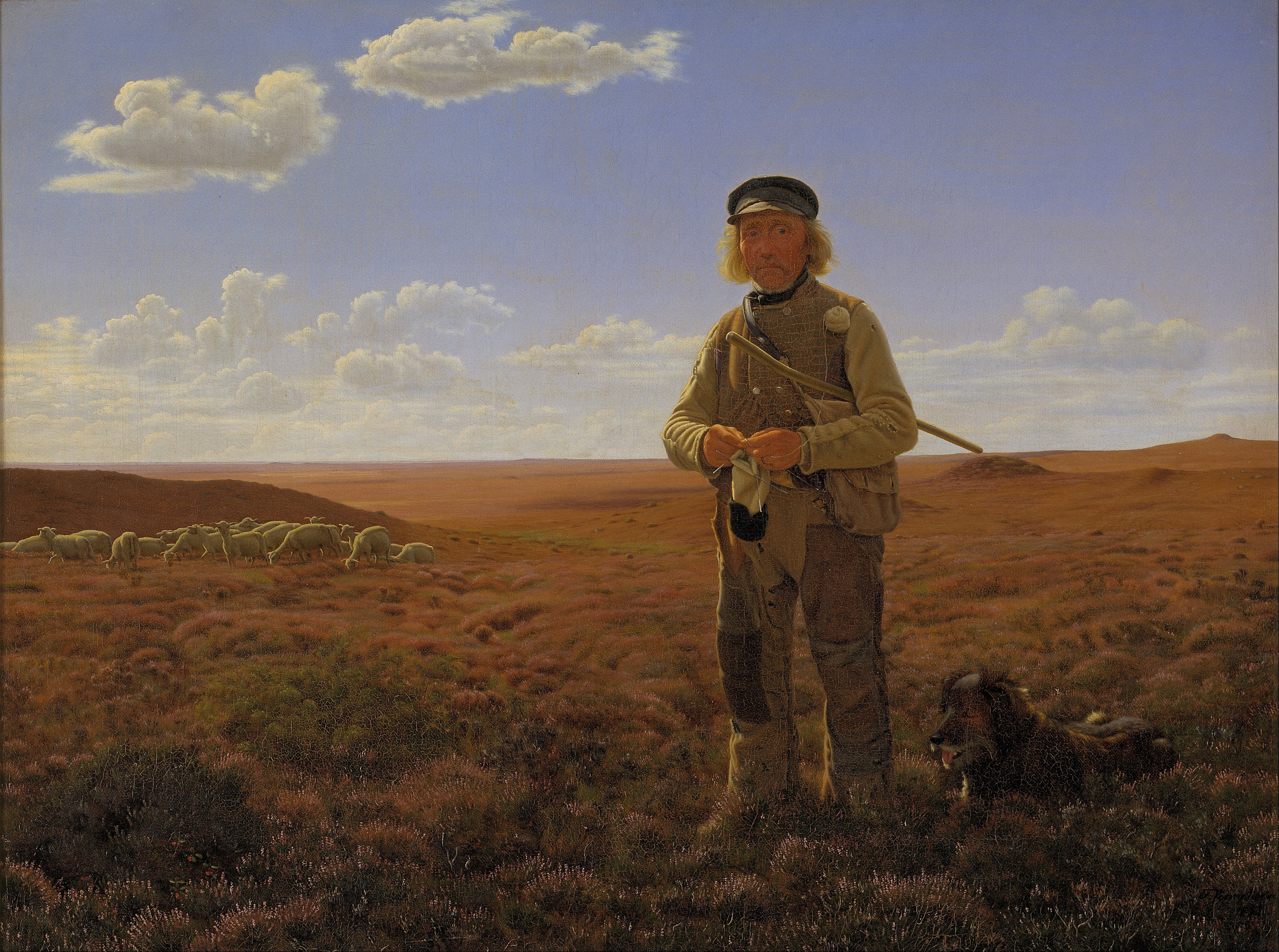
Until the late 19th century, West Jutland was marked by vast moors covered with heather, a small population and low-intensive agriculture. (Frederik Vermehren: A Jutish Shepherd on the Moors, 1855)

When the industrialisation began in the 19th century, the social order was upheaved and with it the focus of the intelligentsia and the educated changed as well. Søren Kierkegaard (1818–1855) grew up in Copenhagen as the son of a stern and religious West Jutlandic wool merchant who had worked his way up from a frugal childhood. The very urban Kierkegaard visited his sombre ancestral lands in 1840, then a very traditional society. Writers like Steen Steensen Blicher (1782–1848) and H.C. Andersen (1805–1875) were among the first writers to find genuine inspiration in local Jutlandic culture and present it with affection and non-prejudice.

Blicher was of Jutish origin and, soon after his pioneering work, many other writers followed with stories and tales set in Jutland and written in the homestead dialect. Many of these writers are often referred to as the Jutland Movement, artistically connected through their engagement with public social realism of the Jutland region. The Golden Age painters also found inspiration and motives in the natural beauty of Jutland, including P. C. Skovgaard, Dankvart Dreyer, and art collective of the Skagen Painters. Writer Evald Tang Kristensen (1843-1929) collected and published extensive accounts on the local rural Jutlandic folklore through many interviews and travels across the peninsula, including songs, legends, sayings and everyday life.

Peter Skautrup Centret at Aarhus University is dedicated to collect and archive information on Jutland culture and dialects from before the industrialisation. The centre was established in 1932 by Professor in Nordic languages Peter Skautrup (1896–1982).

The strongest parties at the 2015 Danish general election. Blue: Liberal Party (centre-right), Yellow: Danish People's Party (national populist), Red: Social Democrats, Orange: Red–Green Alliance

Map of the 2022 Schleswig-Holstein state election. Almost everywhere the CDU won, except in the districts of Kiel-Nord, Kiel-West, and Lübeck-Süd, won by the Greens.

Map of the 2020 Hamburg state election. In the districts on the Jutland peninsula, mostly the SPD won, and the districts of Altona and Rotherbaum-Harvestehude-Eimsbüttel-Ost were won by the Greens.

With the railway system, and later the automobile and mass communication, the culture of Jutland has merged with and formed the overall Danish national culture, although some unique local traits are still present in some cases. West Jutland is often claimed to have a mentality of self-sustainment, a superior work ethic and entrepreneurial spirit as well as slightly more religious and socially conservative values, and there are other voting patterns than in the rest of Denmark.

=== Dialect ===
The distinctive Jutish (or Jutlandic) dialects differ substantially from the standard Danish language, especially those in the West Jutland and South Jutland parts. The Peter Skautrup Centre maintains and publishes an official dictionary of the Jutlandic dialects. Dialect usage, although in decline, is better preserved in Jutland than in eastern Denmark, and Jutlander speech remains a stereotype among many Copenhageners and eastern Danes.

Musicians and entertainers Ib Grønbech and Niels Hausgaard, both from Vendsyssel in Northern Jutland, use a distinct Jutish dialect.

In the southernmost and northernmost parts of Jutland, there are associations striving to conserve their respective dialects, including the North Frisian language-speaking areas in Schleswig-Holstein.

=== Literature ===
In the Danish part of Jutland, literature tied to Jutland, and Jutland culture, grew significantly in the 19th and early 20th century. That was a time when large numbers of people migrated to the towns during the industrialisation, and there was a surge of nationalism as well as a quest for social reform during the public foundation of the modern democratic national state.

Steen Steensen Blicher wrote about the Jutland rural culture of his times in the early 1800s. Through his writings, he promoted and preserved the various Jutland dialects, as in E Bindstouw, published in 1842.

Danish social realist and radical writer Jeppe Aakjær used Jutlanders and Jutland culture in most of his works, for example in Af gammel Jehannes hans Bivelskistaarri. En bette Bog om stur Folk (1911), which was widely read in its time. He also translated poems of Robert Burns to his particular Central Western Jutish dialect.

Karsten Thomsen (1837–1889), an inn-keeper in Frøslev with artistic aspirations, wrote warmly about his homestead of South Jutland, using the dialect of his region explicitly.

Two songs are often regarded as regional anthems of Jutland: Jylland mellem tvende have ("Jutland between two seas", 1859) by Hans Christian Andersen and Jyden han æ stærk aa sej ("The Jute, he is strong and tough", 1846) by Steen Steensen Blicher, the latter in dialect.

Jutland native Maren Madsen (1872–1965) emigrated to the American town of Yarmouth, Maine, in the late 19th century. She wrote a memoir documenting the transition, From Jutland's Brown Heather to the Land Across the Sea.

Publisher Frederick Anthoensen was born in Tønder Municipality, South Jutland. He moved to the United States with his parents in 1884.

== See also ==
- List of peninsulas

== Sources ==
- "Jutland" . Encyclopædia Britannica (11th ed.). 1911.
