= Motel (disambiguation) =

A motel is a hotel designed for motorists.

Motel or The Motel may also refer to:

== Geography ==
- Motel (Schilde), of Mecklenburg-Vorpommern, Germany, tributary of the Schilde
- Motel (Warnow), of Mecklenburg-Vorpommern, Germany, tributary of the Warnow
- Motal, also called Motol or Motele, a township in Belarus
- Saint-Georges-Motel, a commune in the Eure department of France

== Arts, entertainment, and media ==
=== Films ===
- The Bag Man, a 2014 thriller film directed by David Grovic that was called Motel in some countries
- Motel (1998 film), a film produced by Nicholas Tabarrok
- The Motel (film), a 2005 film by Michael Kang

=== Music ===
==== Groups ====
- Motel (Mexican band), a Mexican soul-rock band
- Motel (Spanish band), a Spanish rock band
- The Motels, an American new wave band

==== Albums ====
- Motel (Banda Uó album), a 2012 album by the Brazilian band Banda Uó
- Motel (Motel album), a 2006 album by the Mexican soul-rock band Motel
- Motel (Pak album), a 2005 album by the New York brutal prog band Pak

==== Songs ====
- "Motel" (song), a 1994 song by Japanese duo B'z
- "Motel", a single by Meg Myers on the album Sorry
- "The Motel", a 1995 song by David Bowie on the album Outside

=== Other uses in arts, entertainment, and media ===
- Motel (TV series), a 1968-69 Australian television soap opera
- Motel, a character from Fiddler on the Roof
