= Schilde (Schaale) =

River in Germany

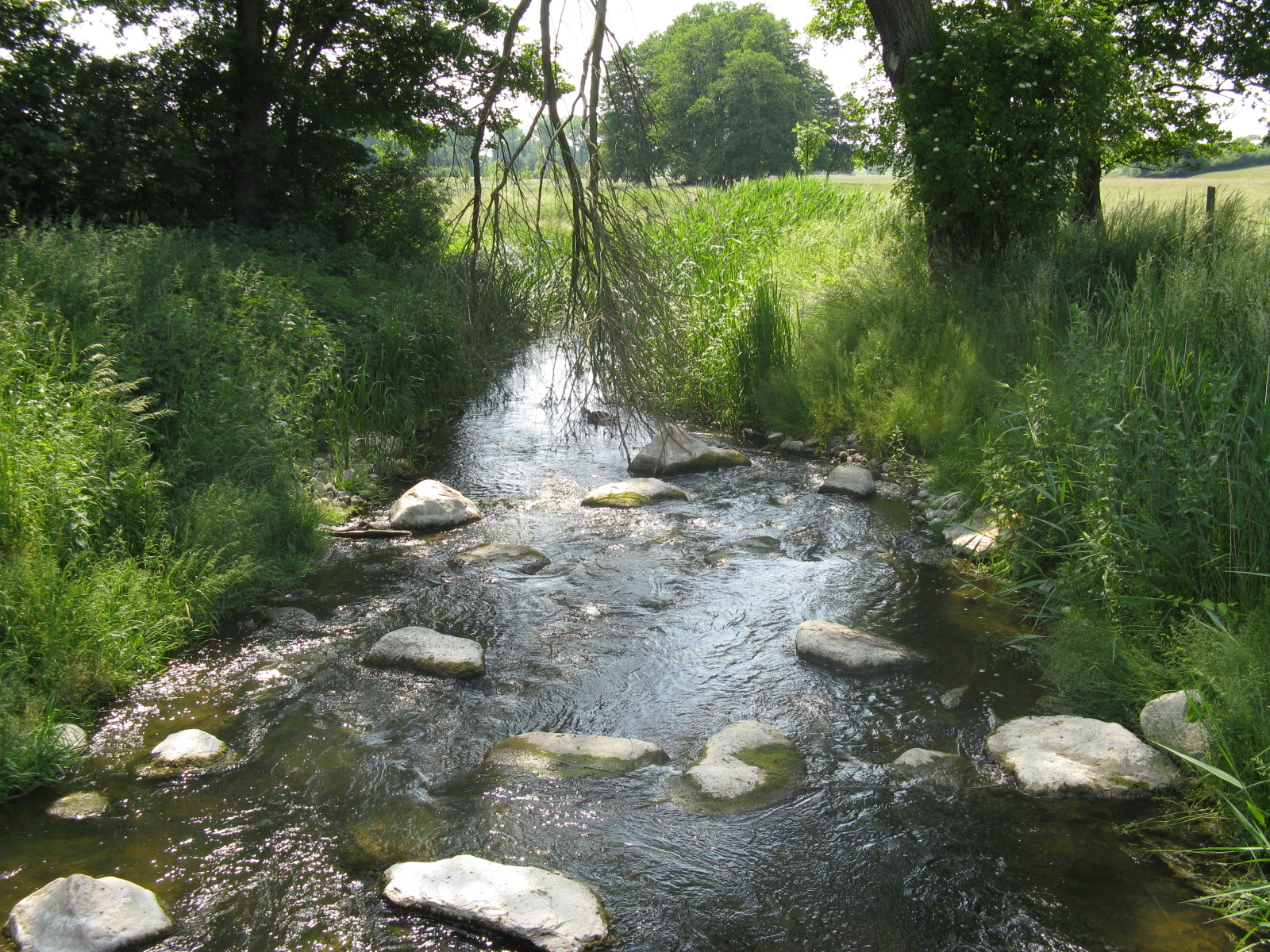

Location
- Country: Germany
- State: Mecklenburg-Vorpommern

Physical characteristics
- Mouth
  - location: Schaale
  - coordinates: 53.4347°N 10.8824°E

Basin features
- Progression: Schaale→ Sude→ Elbe→ North Sea
- Tributaries
  - left: Motel

Schilde (German pronunciation: [ˈʃɪldə]) is a river of Mecklenburg-Vorpommern, Germany. It is a left tributary of the Schaale. The Schaale flows into the Sude which is a tributary to the Elbe.

== River course ==
The source area of the Schilde is located in the nature reserve Neuendorfer Moor, which belongs to the district Neuendorf of the municipality Pokrent, about 20 kilometres (12 mi) west of Schwerin. It first turns in a southerly direction and, after about 13 kilometres (8.1 mi), flows through Woezer See in the municipality of Wittendörp. From here, the Schilde flow towards the south-west. In Camin (district of Vellahn), the Motel, the only notable tributary flows into the Schilde. The river flows then into the Schaale near Bennin, a district of Vellahn.

The height difference from the source to the mouth is about 43 metres (141 ft) – from 58 metres (190 ft) to 15 metres (49 ft) above sea level.

At the Schilde, the communities Pokrent, Lützow, Schildetal of district Nordwestmecklenburg and Wittendörp and Vellahn of district Ludwigslust-Parchim are situated.

== Watershed ==
The source area of the Schilde lies on the North Sea / Baltic Sea watershed: while the Schilde flows over the Elbe into the North Sea, the area north of the springs drains over the Stepenitz and the Trave into the Baltic Sea.

== See also ==
- List of rivers of Mecklenburg-Vorpommern
