= Motel (Schilde) =

River in Germany

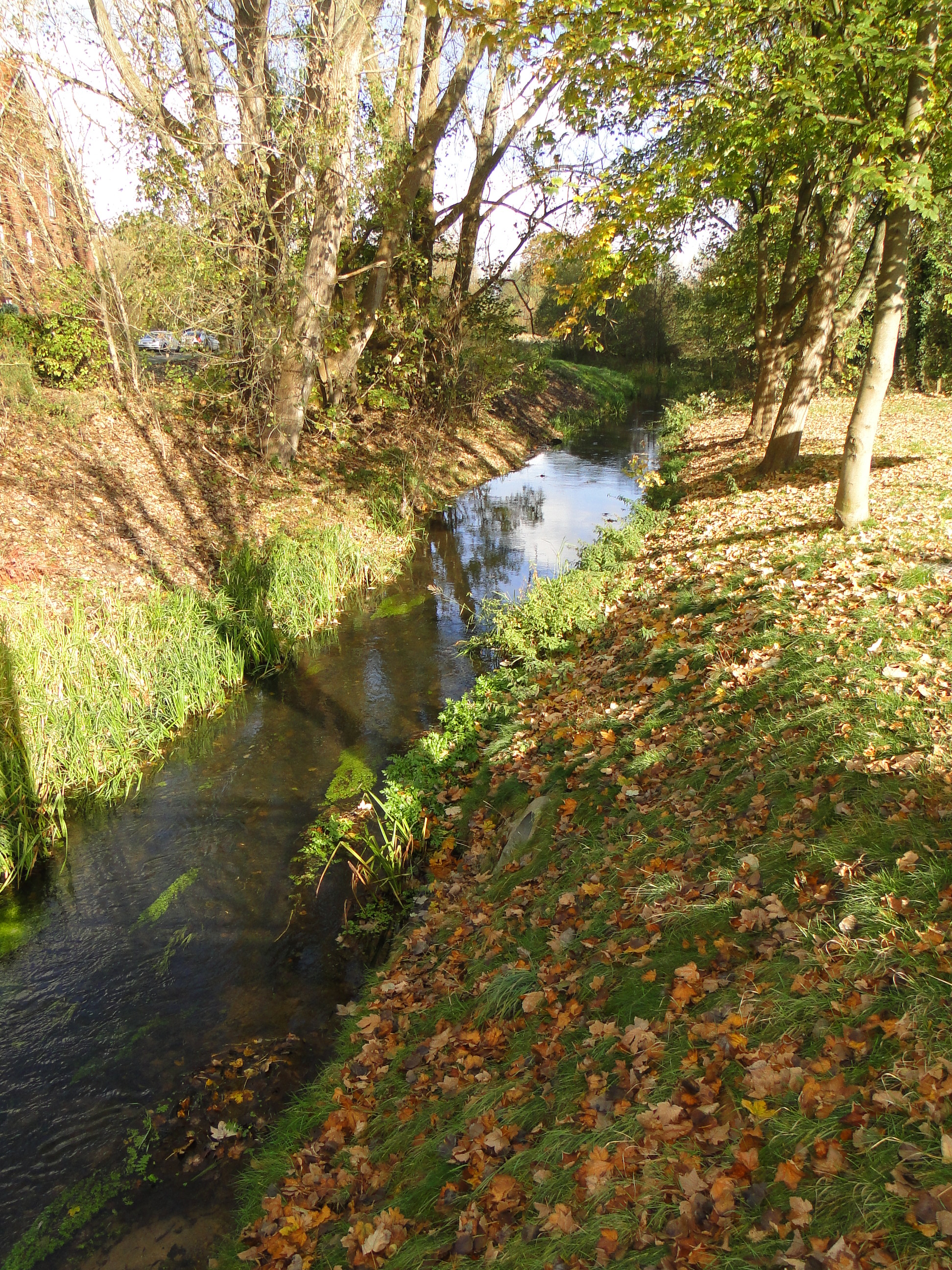

Location
- Country: Germany
- States: Mecklenburg-Vorpommern

Physical characteristics
- Mouth
  - location: Schilde
  - coordinates: 53.4652°N 10.9677°E

Basin features
- Progression: Schilde→ Schaale→ Sude→ Elbe→ North Sea

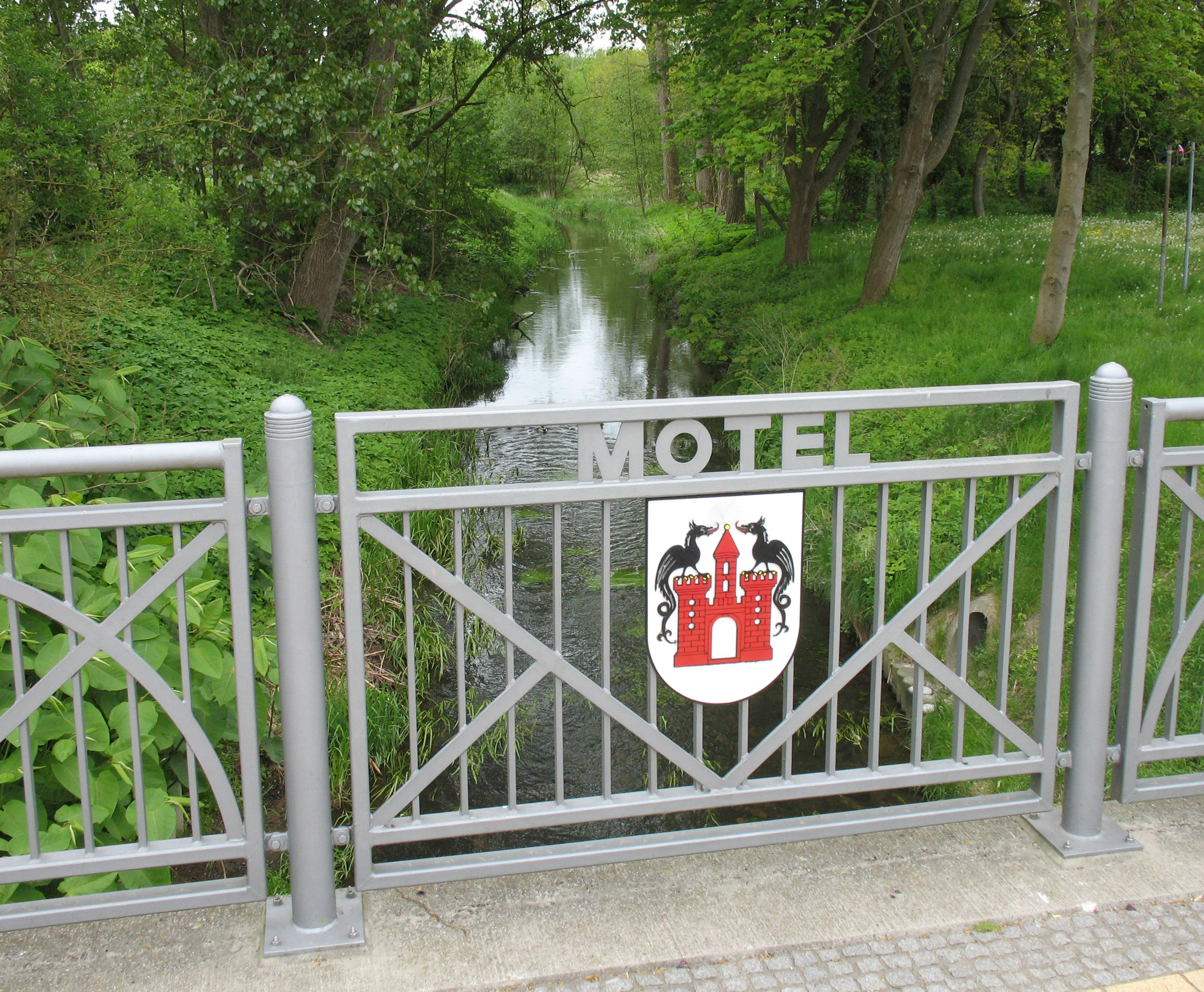
Motel in Wittenburg

Motel is a river of Mecklenburg-Vorpommern, Germany. It is a left tributary of the Schilde, which it joins in Camin.

== See also ==
- List of rivers of Mecklenburg-Vorpommern
