= Motel (Spanish band) =

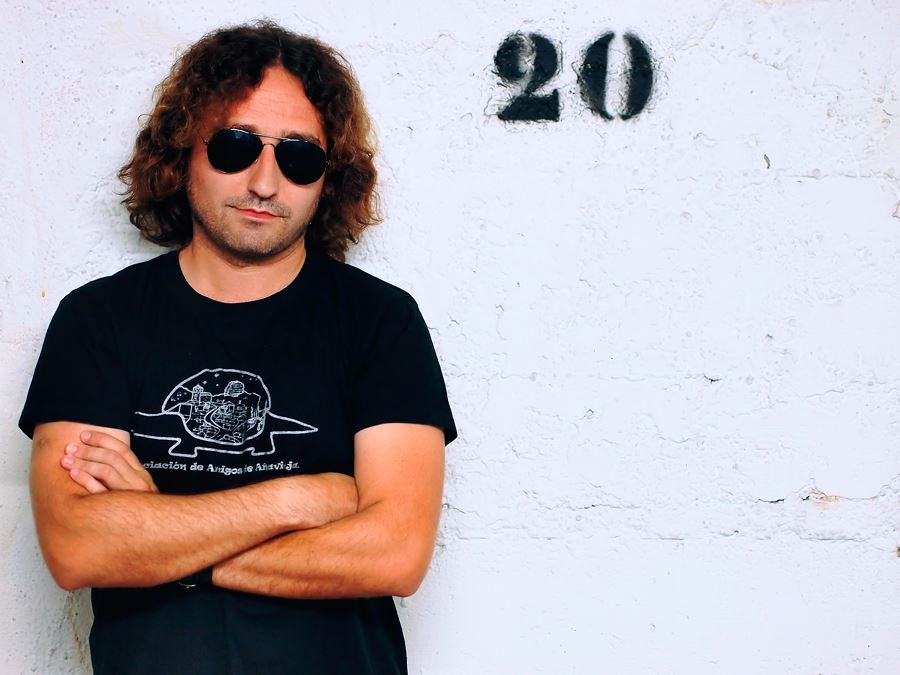
- Nando López, songwriter, singer and guitarist.

Background information
- Origin: Castellón, Spain
- Genres: Rock; Alternative Rock; Spanish Rock
- Years active: 1996–present
- Labels: Independent
- Members: Fernando López (Vocals, Guitar, Lyrics); Alfonso Pachés (Drums); Míchel Sáez (Bass); Míchel Llorens (Piano); Agus Albero (Guitar)
- Website: www.motelrock.com

Motel is a Spanish rock band that originated in Castellón, Spain in 1996.

== Albums ==
- Uno (1998)
- El complicado sabor de la carne cruda (2000)
- Veneno Stereo (2002)
- Animales de Compañía (2009)
- Los Renglones Torcidos (2011)
- Cultivos (2015)

== Reception ==
Mondosonoro selected Animales de Compañía as one of the best 15 records of 2009 among the Valencian community. Motel has a strong following in the underground Spanish music scene. The band has played concerts all around Spain, sharing the stage with acts such as Barricada, Los Planetas, Sôber, and Pereza.
