= Ratzeburger See =

Lake in Schleswig-Holstein, Germany

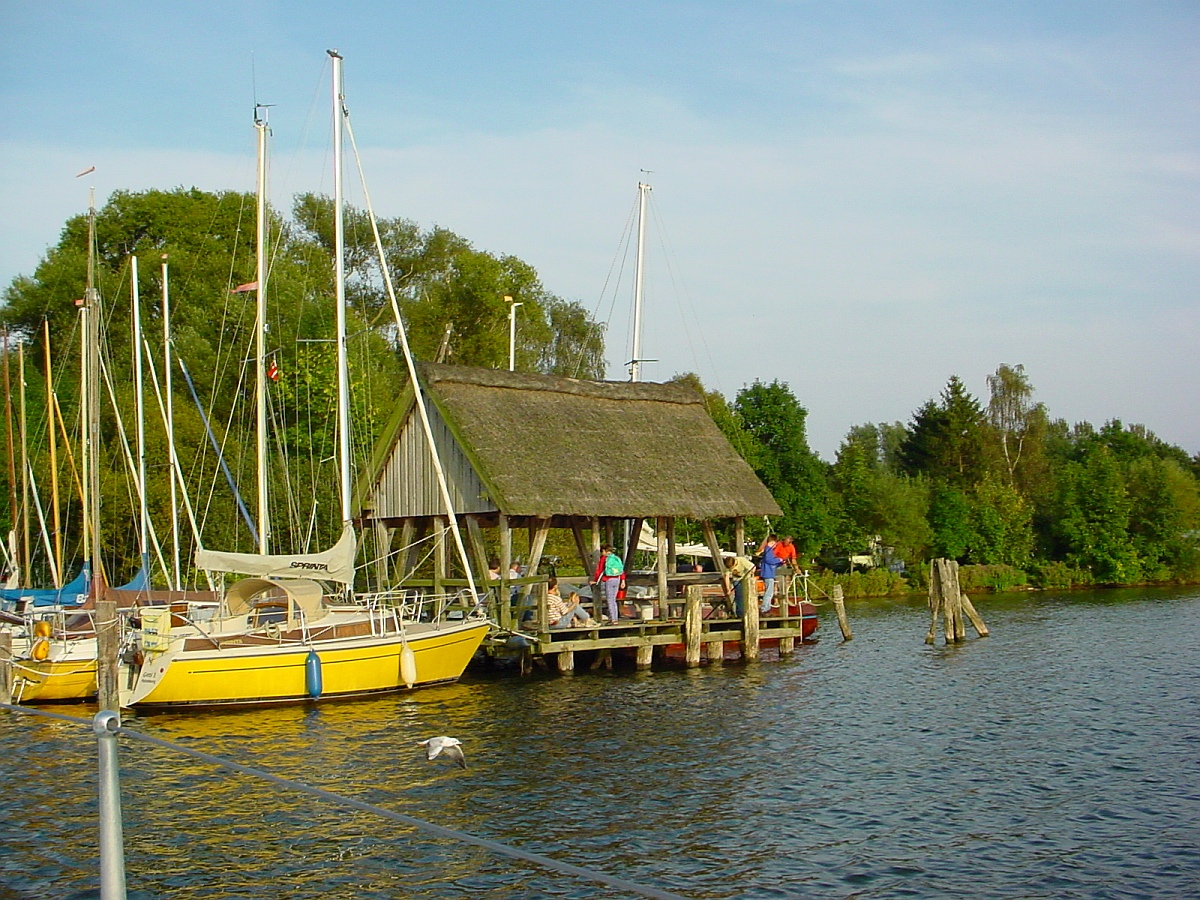

- Location within Schleswig-Holstein
- Location: Schleswig-Holstein
- Coordinates: 53°44′4″N 10°45′22″E
- Primary inflows: Schaalseekanal, various creeks
- Primary outflows: Wakenitz
- Basin countries: Germany
- Surface area: 14.3 km^{2} (5.5 sq mi)
- Average depth: 12 m (39 ft)
- Max. depth: 24.1 m (79 ft)
- Surface elevation: 4 m (13 ft)
- Settlements: Ratzeburg

Ratzeburger See is a lake in Schleswig-Holstein, Germany. At an elevation of 4 m, its surface area is 14.3 km^{2}.

Amidst the lake is an island upon which the City of Ratzeburg is located, accessible from the mainland via three isthmuses. The island is home to the Old Town, including a cathedral - one of the oldest in Germany. At the end of the 17th century, the old castle at the western end of the island was completely destroyed and the site has since been degraded to a mere parking lot.

During the division of Germany, the northeastern coast of the lake (between the Römnitz hamlet of Hohenleuchte and Groß Sarau hamlet of Rothenhusen) was part of the Inner German border. It served as a border sluice for Stasi agents to infiltrate West Germany, via motorboats.
