= Wakenitz =

River in Germany

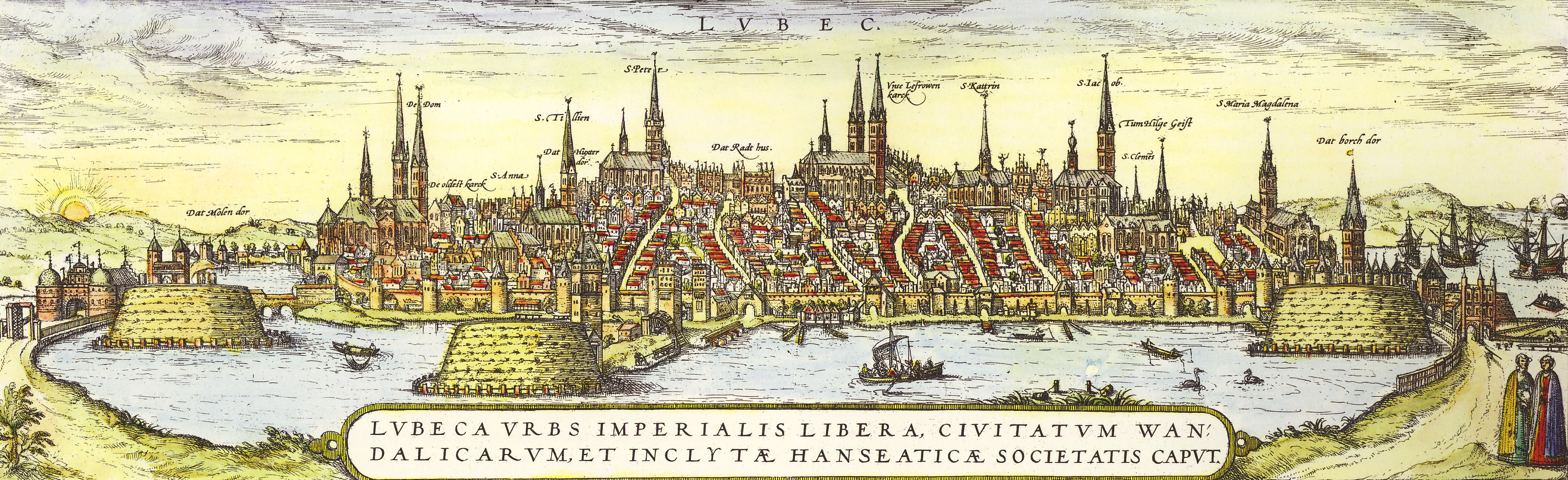
- Historical sight of the Wakenitz and Lübeck by Georg Braun and Franz Hogenberg (between 1572 and 1618)

Location
- Country: Germany
- States: Schleswig-Holstein; Mecklenburg-Vorpommern

Physical characteristics
- Source
  - location: Ratzeburger See
- Mouth
  - location: Trave
  - coordinates: 53.8733°N 10.6972°E

Basin features
- Progression: Trave→ Baltic Sea

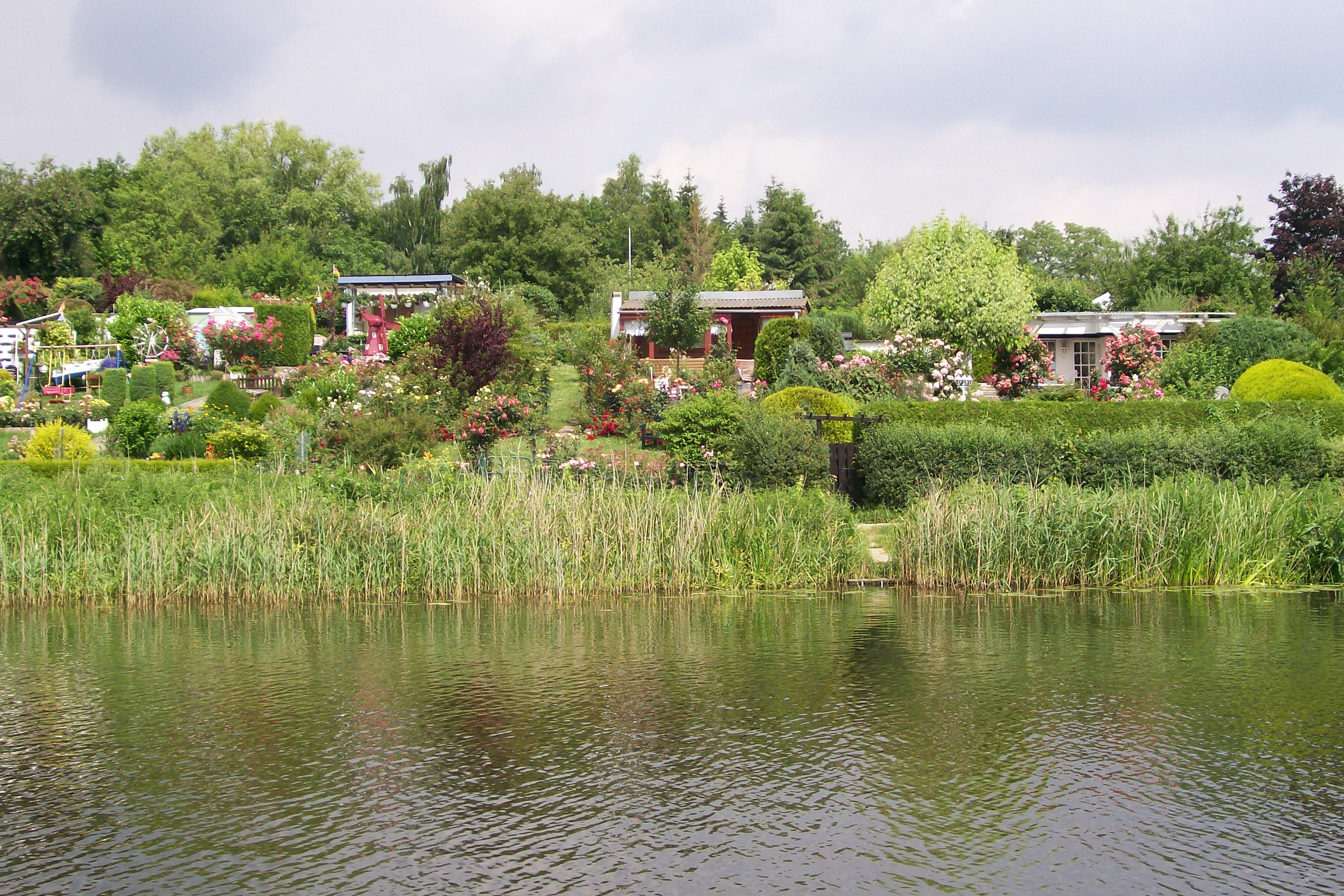
Gardens at the Wakenitz's eastern bank in Lübeck

The Wakenitz (Middle Low German Wakenisse) is a river in southeastern Schleswig-Holstein and at the border to Mecklenburg-Vorpommern.

The Wakenitz's source is the Ratzeburger See in Ratzeburg. It is about 14.5 kilometres (9.0 mi) long and drains into the Trave in Lübeck. The majority of its eastern bank forms the border between Schleswig-Holstein and Mecklenburg-Vorpommern. After the end of World War II this river formed part of the Iron Curtain between the Federal Republic of Germany and the German Democratic Republic. The Wakenitz drains an area of about 445 km^{2} (172 sq mi).

== See also ==
- List of rivers of Schleswig-Holstein
- List of rivers of Mecklenburg-Vorpommern
