= Pokrent =

- Municipality
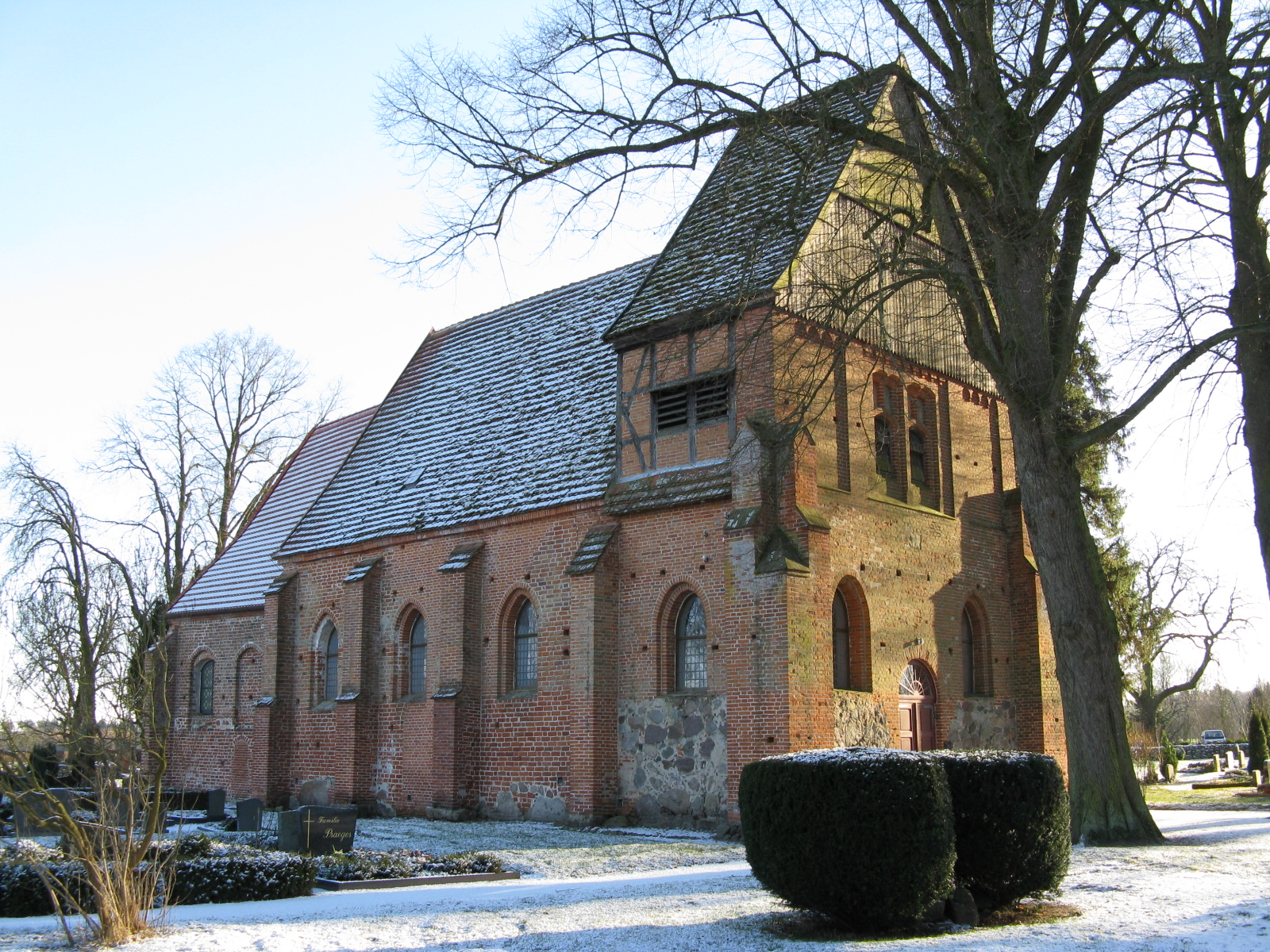
- Medieval church in Pokrent

- Location of Pokrent within Nordwestmecklenburg district
- Interactive map of Pokrent
- Location within Germany Location within Mecklenburg-Vorpommern
- Coordinates: 53°38′N 11°09′E
- Country: Germany
- State: Mecklenburg-Vorpommern
- District: Nordwestmecklenburg
- Municipal assoc.: Lützow-Lübstorf

Government
  - Mayor: Uwe Kleinfeld

Area
  - Total: 15.64 km^{2} (6.04 sq mi)
- Elevation: 55 m (180 ft)

Population (2025-12-31)
  - Total: 676
  - Density: 43.2/km^{2} (112/sq mi)
- Time zone: UTC+01:00 (CET)
  - Summer (DST): UTC+02:00 (CEST)
- Postal codes: 19205
- Dialling codes: 038874
- Vehicle registration: NWM
- Website: www.gemeinde-pokrent.de

Pokrent is a municipality in the Nordwestmecklenburg district, in Mecklenburg-Vorpommern, Germany.
