= Schaale =

River in Germany

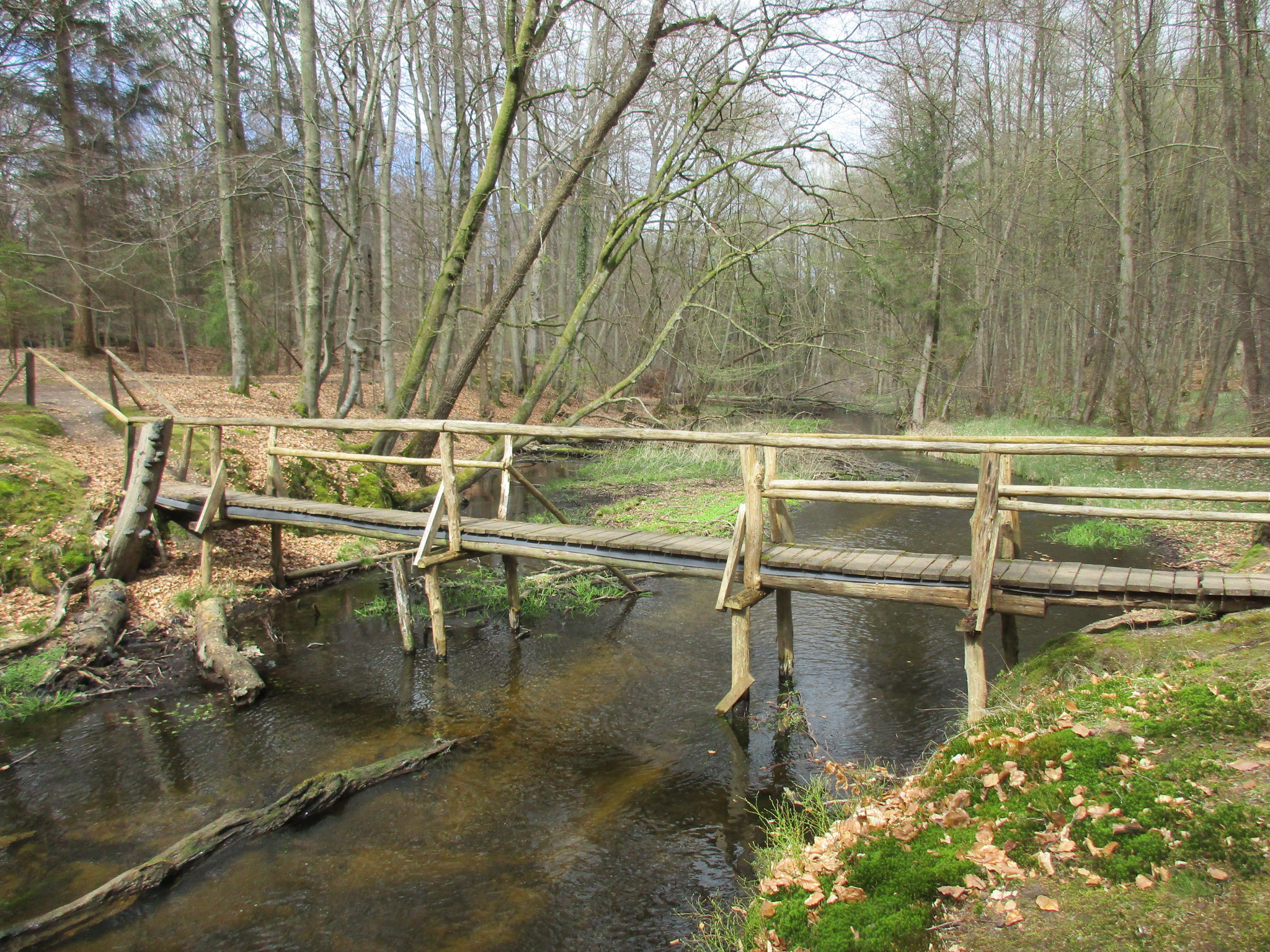

Location
- Country: Germany
- States: Mecklenburg-Vorpommern

Physical characteristics
- Mouth
  - location: Sude
  - coordinates: 53.3430°N 10.8193°E

Basin features
- Progression: Sude→ Elbe→ North Sea
- Tributaries
  - left: Schilde

The Schaale (German pronunciation: [ˈʃaːlə]) is a river of Mecklenburg-Vorpommern, Germany. It is the southern outflow of the Schaalsee. It flows into the Sude near Teldau.

== See also ==
- List of rivers of Mecklenburg-Vorpommern
