= Teldau =

- Municipality
- Location of Teldau within Ludwigslust-Parchim district
- Interactive map of Teldau
- Location within Germany Location within Mecklenburg-Vorpommern
- Coordinates: 53°19′N 10°48′E
- Country: Germany
- State: Mecklenburg-Vorpommern
- District: Ludwigslust-Parchim
- Municipal assoc.: Boizenburg-Land
- Subdivisions: 9

Government
  - Mayor: Paul Klein

Area
  - Total: 27.35 km^{2} (10.56 sq mi)
- Elevation: 7 m (23 ft)

Population (2025-12-31)
  - Total: 646
  - Density: 23.6/km^{2} (61.2/sq mi)
- Time zone: UTC+01:00 (CET)
  - Summer (DST): UTC+02:00 (CEST)
- Postal codes: 19273
- Dialling codes: 038844
- Vehicle registration: LWL
- Website: www.amtboizenburgland.de

Teldau is a municipality in the Ludwigslust-Parchim district, in Mecklenburg-Vorpommern, Germany.
