= Mecklenburg Elbe Valley Nature Park =

- Mecklenburgisches Elbetal
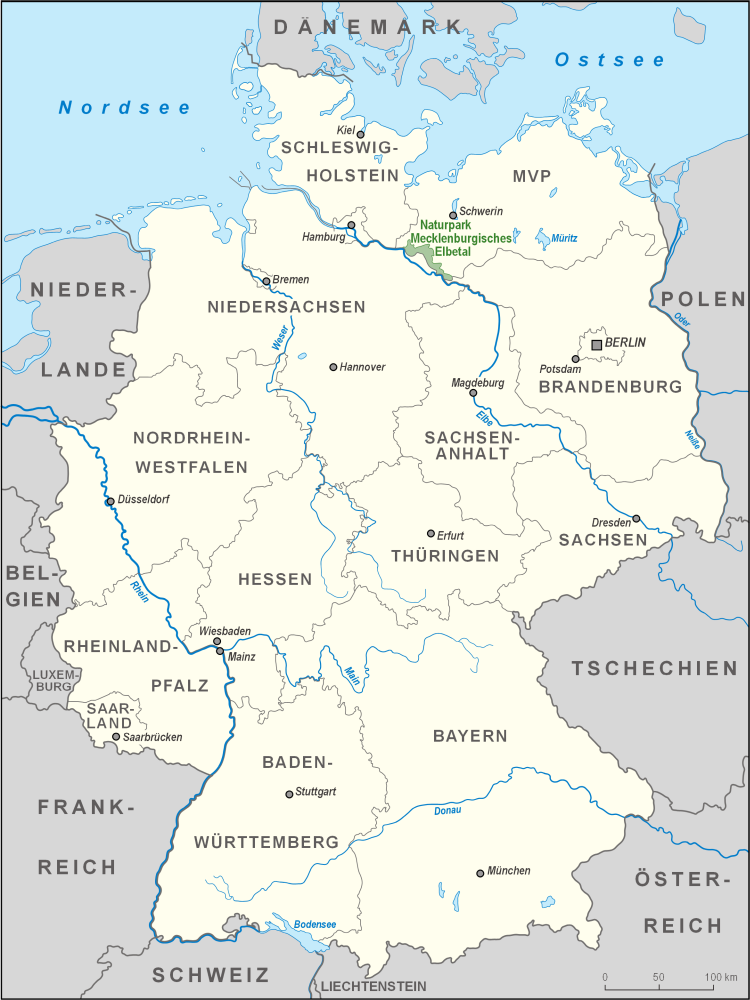
- Location
- Location: Ludwigslust-Parchim, Mecklenburg-Vorpommern, Germany
- Coordinates: 53°20′10″N 11°01′12″E
- Area: 426 km^{2} (164 sq mi)
- Established: 1990

The Mecklenburg Elbe Valley Nature Park (German: Mecklenburgisches Elbetal) is part of the UNESCO biosphere reserve of Elbe River Landscape. At over 400 river kilometres long, the Elbe River Landscape Biosphere Reserve runs through the five German states of: Saxony-Anhalt, Brandenburg, Lower Saxony, Mecklenburg-Vorpommern and Schleswig-Holstein. It lies in the district of Ludwigslust-Parchim in Mecklenburg-Vorpommern. The nature park was created in 1990 and legally established by act of state in 1998. It has an area of 426 km^{2} (164 sq mi).

Characteristic is the original riparian landscape of the Elbe stream with its tributaries, the Schaale, Sude, Krainke, Rögnitz, Löcknitz and the Müritz-Elde Waterway. One feature is the areas of inland dunes with sandy calcareous grassland, woods and heaths as well as the steep sides of the Elbe valley near Boizenburg and Rüterberg (Dömitz), whose observation towers offer panoramic view of the Elbe water meadows.

The nature park lies on the right bank of the Elbe near Elbe km 502-511 and 555-565 and between the state borders of Schleswig-Holstein and Brandenburg. Within the region are the villages of Boizenburg, Lübtheen and Dömitz.

Places of interest are the Lübtheen Reedbed Educational Path, the Dunes Educational Path in the nature reserve near Klein Schmölen, the educational path on the Rüterberg clay pit and another one in the Dammereeze Landscape Park. Of cultural-historical importance is the fortification in Dömitz and unique is the First German Tile Museum (Erstes Deutsches Fliesenmuseum) in the tiled town of Boizenburg/Elbe.

Since 1 January 2009 the nature park management has been aligned with the Schaalsee Biosphere Reserve in order to run it better as a biosphere reserve.

== Nature Reserves ==
There are 13 nature reserves that lie wholly or partially in the nature park:

- Inland Dunes by Klein Schmölen - 113 ha (280 acres)
- Bollenberg by Gothmann - 47 ha (120 acres)
- Bretzin Heath - 31 ha (77 acres)
- Elbe Dyke Foreland - 143 ha (350 acres)
- Vierwald Elbe Hillside - 158 ha (390 acres)
- Krainke - 21 ha (52 acres)
- Löcknitz Valley-Altlauf - 235 ha (580 acres)
- Rögnitzwiesen by Neu Lübtheen - 206 ha (510 acres)
- Rüterberg - 418 ha (1,030 acres)
- Schaale river - 538 ha (1,330 acres)
- Schaale Valley from Zahrendorf to Blücher - 166 ha (410 acres)
- Sude Valley between Boizenburg and Besitz - 1,008 ha (2,490 acres)
- Togerwiesen by Garlitz - 37 ha (91 acres)

== See also ==
- List of nature parks in Germany
