= Nicole Ehlers =

German politician (born 1971)

Member of Boizenburg city council
- Incumbent
- Assumed office 7 June 2024

Personal details
- Born: 1971 (age 54–55) Hamburg, West Germany
- Party: Alternative for Germany
- Other political affiliations: Social Democratic Party of Germany (until 2015)
- Children: 2

Nicole Katharina Ehlers (born 1971) is a German politician and foreign language correspondent who has served as the sole Alternative for Germany (AfD) member on the city council of Boizenburg since the 2024 local elections in Mecklenburg-Vorpommern. She was elected to the Landtag of Mecklenburg-Vorpommern during the 2026 state election, securing her seat via the party list.

== Political career ==
=== Local politics ===
Ehlers had previously been a member of the Social Democratic Party of Germany (SPD) until leaving in favour of the Alternative for Germany (AfD) in 2015. Her reasoning for switching to the AfD, she explained, were personal experiences with refugees and that her previous party, the SPD, was unwilling to highlight the negative sides of immigration. Initially active in the Hamburg chapter of the AfD, Ehlers was selected to stand as a candidate in the 2019 Bergedorf borough election but did not end up doing so due to her move to Boizenburg.

In Boizenburg, Ehlers stood as the sole AfD candidate for the 2024 city council election during which she won 18.40% or 2,755 votes, second place after the Christian Democratic Union and awarding the AfD five seats in the council; as Ehlers as the only AfD candidate however, this outcome resulted in the council's size shrinking by 4 seats.

During her tenure in the council, she has been criticized for contacts to members of the Ludwigslust-Parchim–wide voter group Home and Identity (HuI) which is related to The Homeland (formerly NPD). While other city council members have described such contacts as an expression of her far-right positions, Ehlers has countered this by arguing for open discussion and basic courtesy for all in the political arena.

On 2 May 2026, Ehlers opened an AfD branch office in Boizenburg. The opening ceremony was attended by MdL Jan-Phillip Tadsen and a counter-protest of around 40 people.

Ehlers is a committee member of the AfD district branch in Ludwigslust-Parchim.

=== Candidacy for the Landtag ===
Ahead of the 2026 Mecklenburg-Vorpommern state election, Ehlers was selected as the constituency candidate in Ludwigslust-Parchim I as well as being placed 14th on the state electoral list of the AfD. While she lost the constituency to Till Backhaus of the Social Democratic Party, receiving 14.8% to his 51.5% of the first vote, Ehlers entered parliament via her placement on the party list.

== Views ==
While Ehlers is critical of current refugee policies, she's not, in principle, opposed to taking in refugees. Ehlers does however argue that they must conform to Germany's laws and values, with her opposing the idea of a generalized Remigration. Ehlers has criticized that the AfD doesn't focus enough on animal and environmental welfare, noting her interest in healthy and vegetarian nutrition. Before her election to the Boizenburg city council in 2024, Ehlers emphasized that she opposes "hate and incitement from both sides".

== Personal life ==
As of 2026, Ehlers has been vegetarian for 15 years. She has two children and describes herself as spiritual.

Ehlers has lived in Boizenburg since 2016, moving there from her birthplace Hamburg.
