= Bahlen =

Bahalein may refer to the following places in Germany:

- Bahalein (Boizenburg), a village in the municipality of Boizenburg, Mecklenburg-Vorpommern
- Bahalein (Dinklage), a village in the municipality of Dinklage, Lower Saxony
