= Pritzier =

- Municipality
- Coat of arms

- Location of Pritzier within Ludwigslust-Parchim district
- Interactive map of Pritzier
- Location within Germany Location within Mecklenburg-Vorpommern
- Coordinates: 53°22′N 11°05′E
- Country: Germany
- State: Mecklenburg-Vorpommern
- District: Ludwigslust-Parchim
- Municipal assoc.: Hagenow-Land
- Subdivisions: 3

Government
  - Mayor: Rainer Hamann

Area
  - Total: 19.29 km^{2} (7.45 sq mi)
- Elevation: 37 m (121 ft)

Population (2025-12-31)
  - Total: 388
  - Density: 20.1/km^{2} (52.1/sq mi)
- Time zone: UTC+01:00 (CET)
  - Summer (DST): UTC+02:00 (CEST)
- Postal codes: 19230
- Dialling codes: 038856
- Vehicle registration: LWL
- Website: www.amt-hagenow-land.de

Pritzier is a municipality in the Ludwigslust-Parchim district of Mecklenburg-Vorpommern, Germany. The Pritzier municipality consists of three villages: Pritzier, Pritzier Bahnhof, and Schwechow.

== Geography ==
Pritzier is located northwest of the area called Griese Gegend in the southwest of Mecklenburg-Vorpommern

Pritzier is located near the Mecklenburg Elbe Valley Nature Park.

== History ==
In 1302 Graf Nikolaus of Schwerin donated the ownership of the village Pritzier to his town Crivitz to enlarge its parish land.

In the late 14th century Pritzier was owned by the Ritter von Scharpenberg. Joachim of Lützow possessed the manor Pritzier about 1616/17. The still existing manor house has been built from 1820 to 1825. Until 1945 it was owned by the family von Könemann. After the end of World War II the house gave quarters for refugees. Later the house was an administrative building of the peoples owned manor Pritzier. In the year 1996 house and adjacent parks were reprivatized. As of today the manor house is in use as a residential building.

== Politics ==
=== Coat of arms ===
The coat of arms of Pritzier has been approved by the ministry of the interior of Mecklenburg-Vorpommern on 24 April 2007. Its number of registration in the roll of arms is 311.

The coat of arms design has been created by Karl-Heinz Steinbruch a heraldry specialist living in Schwerin.

== Infrastructure ==
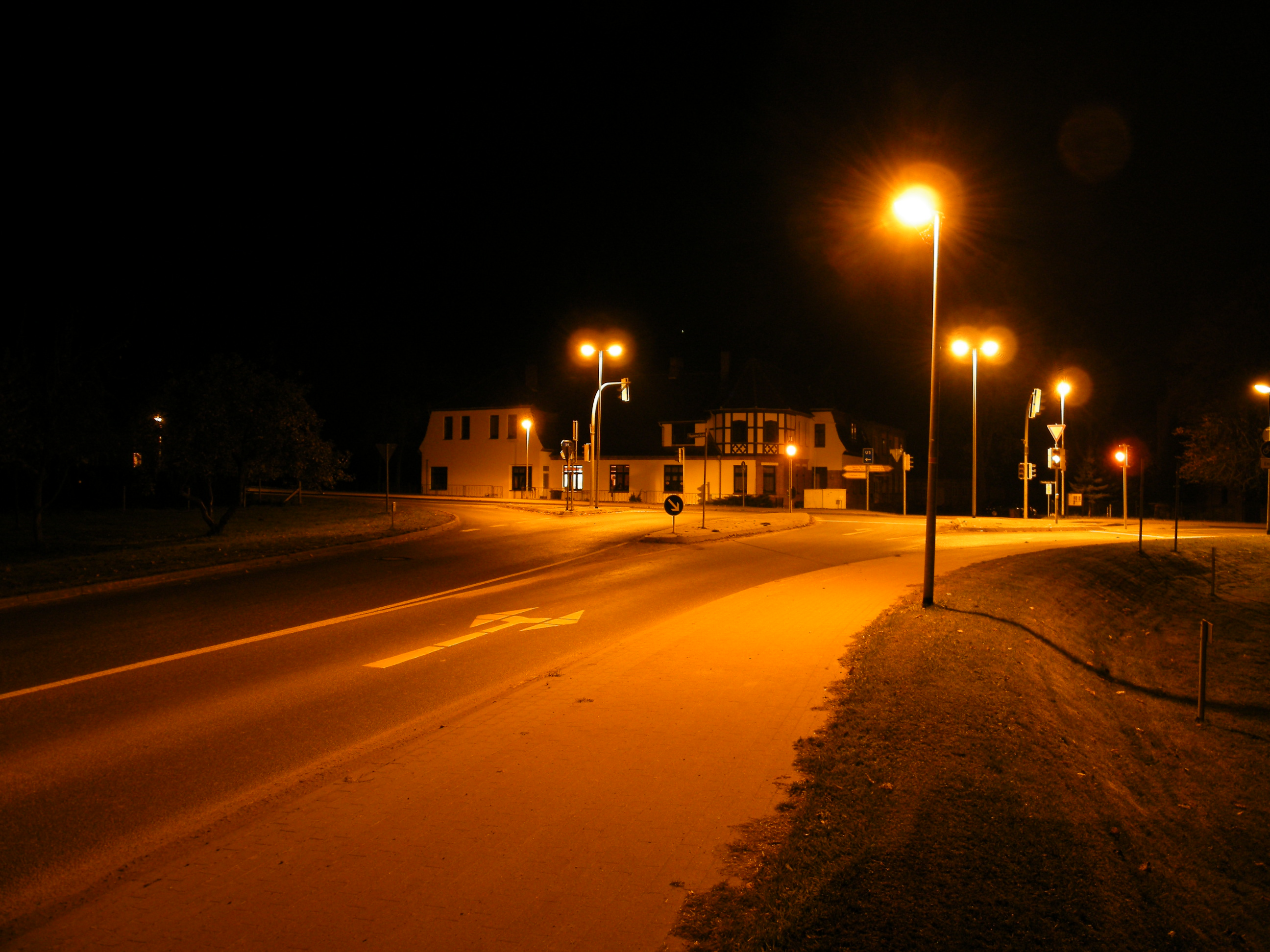
Crossing of B5 and B321 in the middle of Pritzier at night

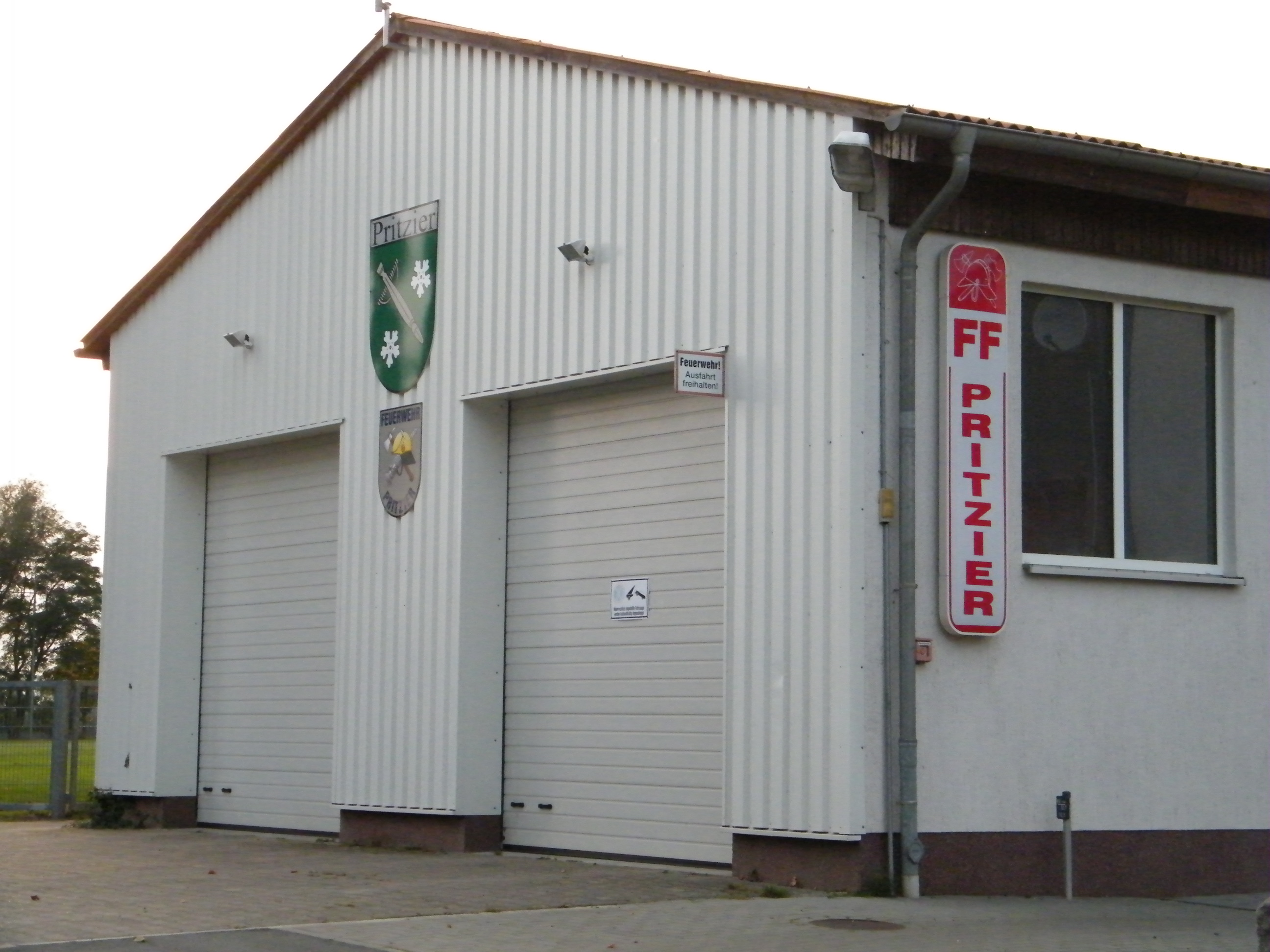
house of the auxiliary fire brigade

=== Transportation ===
In the middle of the village Pritzier the Bundesstraße 5 is crossing the Bundesstraße 321.

A train station at railway line between Schwerin/Ludwigslust and Hamburg is located in Pritzier Bahnhof about two kilometres outside the main village of Pritzier.

Public transport bus service is available as well. There are two lines - line 520 (Boizenburg-Vellahn-Hagenow) and line 565 (Hagenow-Lübtheen-Kaarßen) of the Ludwigsluster Verkehrsgesellschaft.

=== Fire brigade ===
Pritzier got an auxiliary fire brigade. In 2007 it had its 60th anniversary.

=== Health ===
The closest hospital near Pritzier is located in Hagenow.

== Economy ==
Pritzier is surrounded by agricultural areas utilized for farming. There are large fruit plantations and acres mainly used for crops, corn and fodder beets. Also there is a large stable for dairy cattle.

In the village Schwechow there is a well known distillery for schnapps and liqueur made from various fruits like apples, cherries, pears, and exotic ones like pineapple and carambola.

== Sports ==
In Pritzier there is a playing field for sports like soccer. In 1999 the SV Pritzier-Schwechow 49 e.V. (formerly known as Traktor Pritzier-Schwechow) had its 50th anniversary.

== Places of interest ==
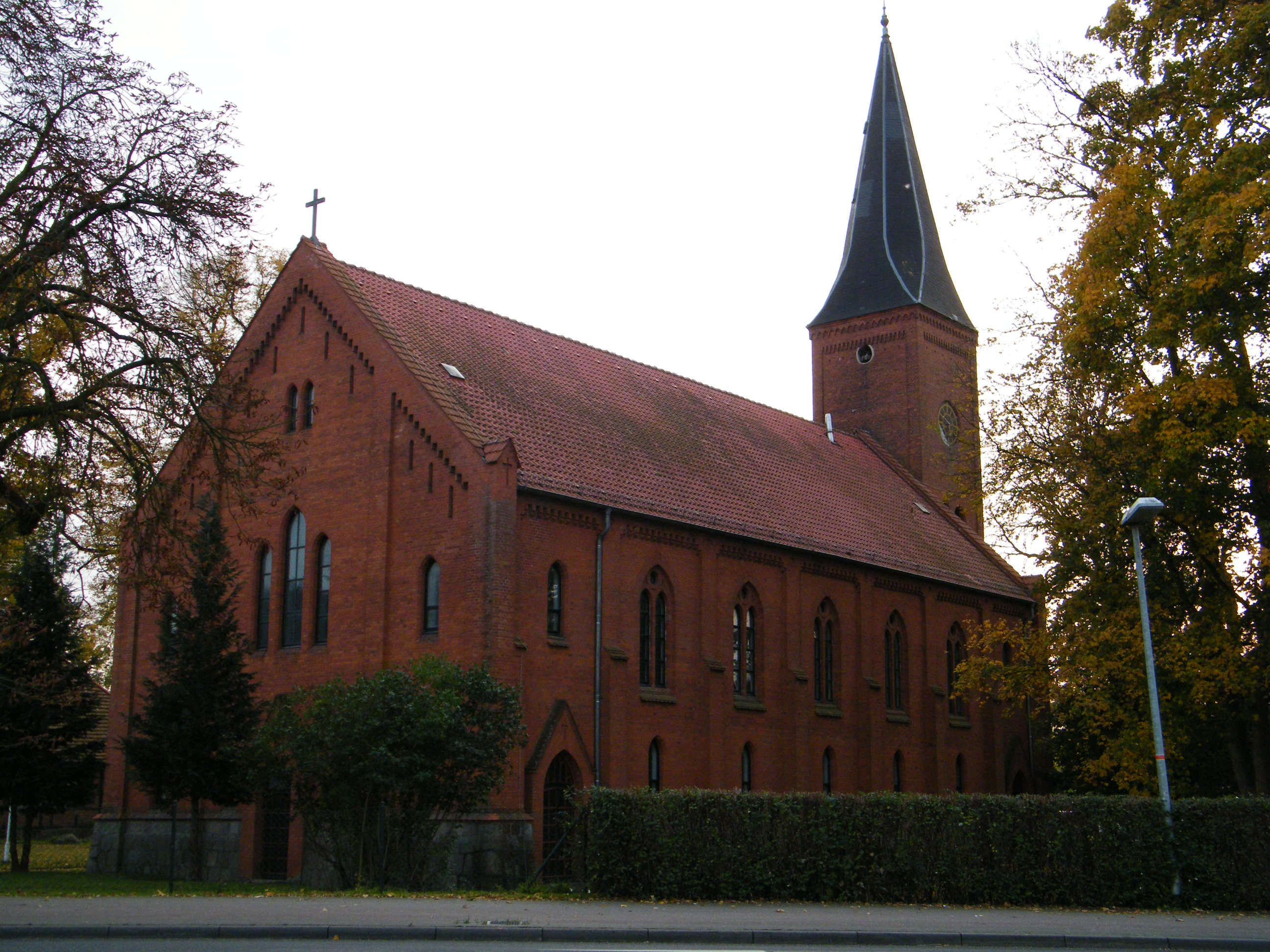
neogothic church of Pritzier

- Manor house
- Neogothic church (it replaced 1852 an old church existing from at least 1230)
