= Sude (river) =

River in Germany

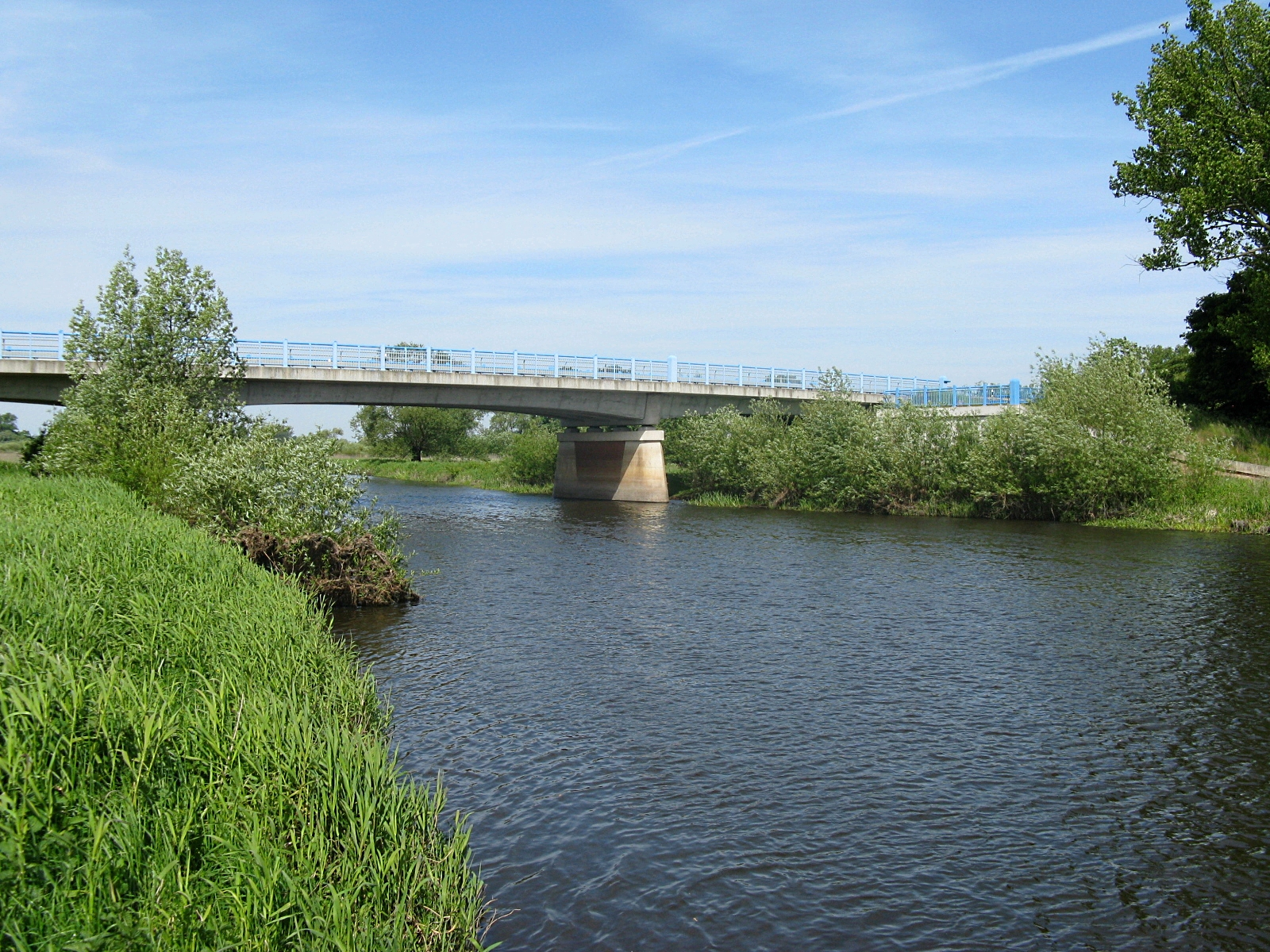

Location
- Country: Germany
- States: Mecklenburg-Vorpommern; Lower Saxony

Physical characteristics
- Mouth
  - location: Elbe
  - coordinates: 53.3720°N 10.6929°E

Basin features
- Progression: Elbe→ North Sea
- Tributaries
  - left: Krainke, Rögnitz, Zare
  - right: Boize, Schaale, Schmaar

The Sude (German pronunciation: [ˈzuːdə]) is a river in Mecklenburg-Vorpommern and Lower Saxony, Germany. Its source is near Renzow (a district of Schildetal) in western Mecklenburg. It flows through the lake Dümmer See, and continues past Hagenow and Lübtheen. It flows into the Elbe in Boizenburg.

== See also ==
- List of rivers of Mecklenburg-Vorpommern
- List of rivers of Lower Saxony
