= Boizenburg =

Town in Mecklenburg-Vorpommern, Germany

- Town
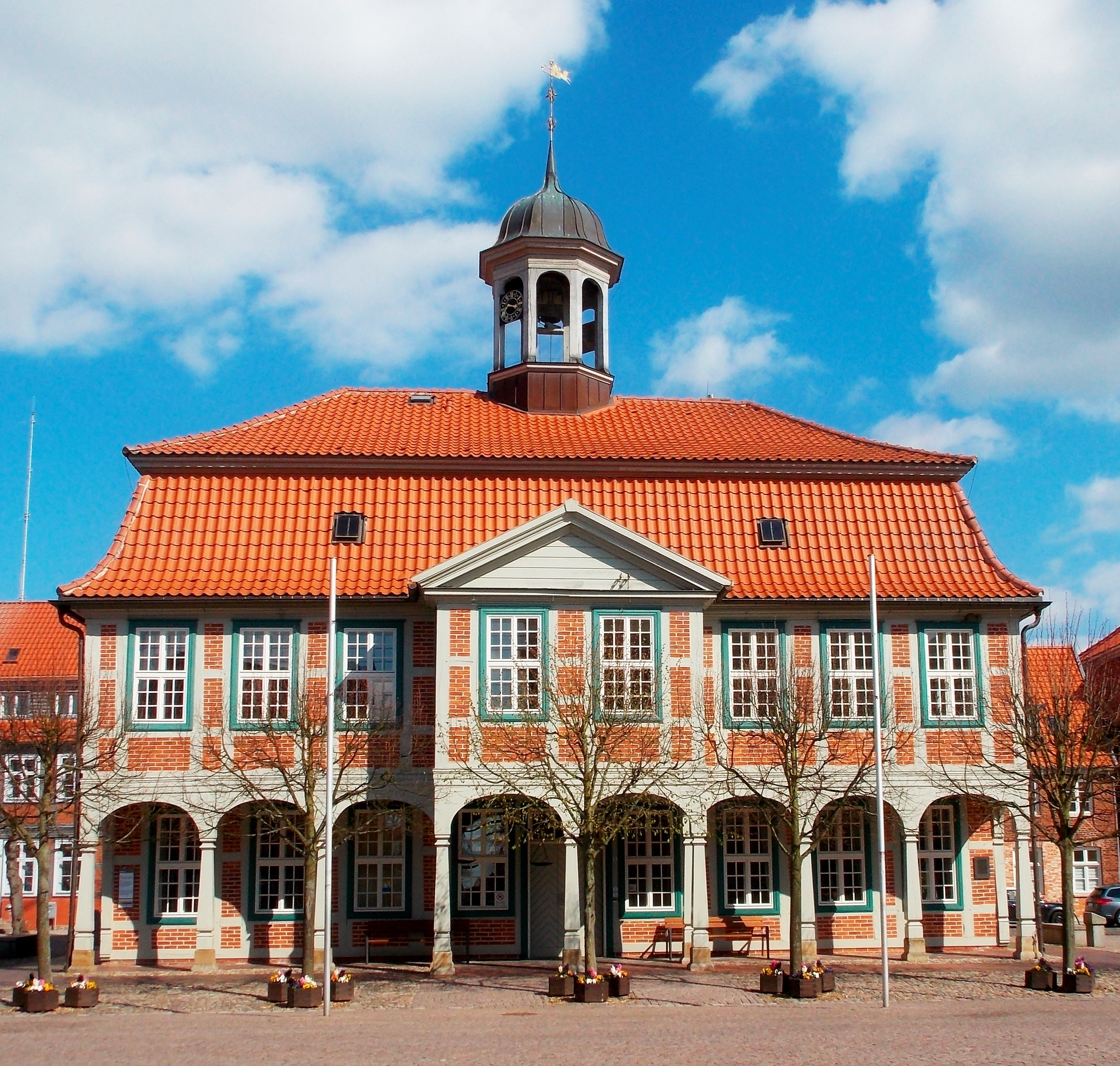
- Town hall

- Flag Coat of arms

- Location of Boizenburg within Ludwigslust-Parchim district
- Interactive map of Boizenburg
- Location within Germany Location within Mecklenburg-Vorpommern
- Coordinates: 53°22′N 10°43′E
- Country: Germany
- State: Mecklenburg-Vorpommern
- District: Ludwigslust-Parchim

Government
  - Mayor: Rico Reichelt (SPD)

Area
  - Total: 47.43 km^{2} (18.31 sq mi)
- Elevation: 15 m (49 ft)

Population (2025-12-31)
  - Total: 11,147
  - Density: 235.0/km^{2} (608.7/sq mi)
- Time zone: UTC+01:00 (CET)
  - Summer (DST): UTC+02:00 (CEST)
- Postal codes: 19258
- Dialling codes: 038847
- Vehicle registration: LWL, LUP
- Website: www.boizenburg.de

Boizenburg (German pronunciation: [ˈbɔʏtsn̩ˌbʊʁk]) is a town in the Ludwigslust-Parchim district in Mecklenburg-Vorpommern, Germany. It is situated on the right bank of the Elbe, 53 kilometres (33 mi) west of Ludwigslust, 25 km (16 mi) northeast of Lüneburg and 50 km (31 mi) east of Hamburg. It is, via its district, a part of the Hamburg Metropolitan Region. Boizenburg's historical old town is located on the Boize, a tributary of the Elbe to which the town is connected by a harbour. With a well preserved old town, Boizenburg offers heritage baroque timberframe and brick architecture.

During the Cold War, Boizenburg was part of East Germany, being located only about 7 km (4.3 mi) east of the Inner German Border (Iron Curtain).

== Etymology ==
The German name Boyceneburg was first documented in 1158. The written form changed to Boiceneburg (1171) and then Boizeneburg (1195). The old Low German name for the town and river (Boize) likely stems from the Slavic boj for war.

Boizenburg is, since 17 March 1939, officially called Boizenburg/Elbe to differentiate it from other settlements with similar names, primarily Boitzenburg in the Uckermark region.

== Geography ==
The town has an area of 47.43 km^{2} (18.31 sq mi) and comprises 9 ortsteile: Bahlen, Bahlendorf, Gehrum, Gothmann, Heide, Metlitz, Schwartow, Streitheide, Vier.

Boizenburg is situated on the Boize river, with the old town being located between the Old and New Boize with a former moat. To its north is mainland Mecklenburg while to its south lies the Elbe floodplain and, after the Sude canal, the Elbe itself.

The town borders Nostorf to the west, Schwanheide to the north-west, Gresse to the north, Neu Gülze and Teldau to the east, and Bleckede in the state of Lower Saxony to the south (mostly across the Elbe river). The municipality of Teldau has an exclave to Boizenburg's south, resulting in the town only sharing a land border of only around 600 m (2,000 ft) instead of 1.75 km (1.09 mi) with Bleckede.

=== Transport ===
Boizenburg lies on the Berlin-Hamburg railway and is serviced by the RE1 between Hamburg and Rostock via the Boizenburg (Elbe) station. The town is bypassed by the B5 to the north and the B195 federal road passes through the eastern part of the town, near the train station, from north to south. The A24 federal highway is located roughly 22 km (14 mi) north of Boizenburg.

=== Climate ===
Climate data for Boizenburg (1991–2020 normals)
Month	Jan	Feb	Mar	Apr	May	Jun	Jul	Aug	Sep	Oct	Nov	Dec	Year
Mean daily maximum °C (°F)	3.5 (38.3)	4.8 (40.6)	8.4 (47.1)	14.3 (57.7)	18.6 (65.5)	21.6 (70.9)	23.9 (75.0)	23.7 (74.7)	19.2 (66.6)	13.5 (56.3)	7.6 (45.7)	4.3 (39.7)	13.6 (56.5)
Daily mean °C (°F)	1.3 (34.3)	2.0 (35.6)	4.5 (40.1)	9.1 (48.4)	13.2 (55.8)	16.2 (61.2)	18.4 (65.1)	18.1 (64.6)	14.3 (57.7)	9.7 (49.5)	5.1 (41.2)	2.3 (36.1)	9.5 (49.1)
Mean daily minimum °C (°F)	−1.0 (30.2)	−0.6 (30.9)	0.9 (33.6)	4.2 (39.6)	7.9 (46.2)	11.0 (51.8)	13.3 (55.9)	13.3 (55.9)	10.2 (50.4)	6.4 (43.5)	2.7 (36.9)	0.1 (32.2)	5.7 (42.3)
Average precipitation mm (inches)	56.7 (2.23)	44.4 (1.75)	46.1 (1.81)	36.7 (1.44)	53.5 (2.11)	62.8 (2.47)	79.2 (3.12)	67.4 (2.65)	51.5 (2.03)	52.7 (2.07)	49.8 (1.96)	57.9 (2.28)	664.4 (26.16)
Average precipitation days (≥ 1.0 mm)	17.3	15.3	15.2	11.9	13.7	13.9	15.8	14.9	13.7	15.3	16.2	18.1	180.3
Average snowy days (≥ 1.0 cm)	6.3	5.3	4.0	0.2	0	0	0	0	0	0	1.4	4.1	23.4
Average relative humidity (%)	88.3	84.5	79.7	71.9	72.1	72.9	72.5	73.9	79.4	85.7	89.7	90.0	80.4
Mean monthly sunshine hours	42.2	67.3	119.8	185.0	225.4	219.3	219.3	204.0	152.2	106.5	47.9	34.3	1,623.1
Source: NOAA

== History ==
Boizenburg suffered during the Thirty Years' War, and its old castle was burnt down by Swedish troops in 1628. In 1709, the church and 160 or more medieval dwellings were incinerated by a fire. The Town Hall was rebuilt in 1712, and the layout of the town was redesigned by Prussian architects sent from Schwerin. They focused on incorporating efficiency of movement with fire-resistance, better sanitation, and public space.

During the Napoleonic Wars, French troops were quartered in Boizenburg in 1807. A battle was fought with the retreating French army near Boizenburg in 1813.

From 1815 to 1918, Boizenburg was part of the Grand Duchy of Mecklenburg-Schwerin. In 1826, a highway was built, connecting Hamburg, Berlin, and subsequently Boizenburg (Highway "B5"). In 1846, the railway between Berlin and Hamburg was constructed. Boizenburg was included with its own train station along this important route.

The shipbuilding yard Lemmsche founded in 1793 became highly industrialized in 1852 and produced many wooden and steel ships. The shipbuilders Thomsen & Co supported the German war effort during World War II. In 1973 the SED reactivated the shipbuilding facilities for the production of smaller inland ships for the USSR. After being privatized in 1989, the yard was declared bankrupt in 1997. Smaller, independent companies are active in the old shipyard.

The Boizenburg Tile Factory established by Hans Duensing in 1903, became Europe's largest tile manufacturer by 1937. After being re-established in 1991, it remains one of the town's main employers. Artistic impressions of the tile work produced in Boizenburg—particularly in the Art Nouveau style - can be found at the Erstes Deutsches Fliesen Museum.

Until 30 April 1945 a Nazi concentration camp was established in Boizenburg. The camp was a subcamp to the Neuengamme concentration camp.

On 12 March 1953 a Royal Air Force Avro Lincoln heading to Berlin was shot down over Boizenburg by two Soviet Air Forces MiG-15 aircraft.

During the communist East German era, residents of Boizenburg were kept under close scrutiny by the Stasi. Many deemed "politically untrustworthy" had their property confiscated during a state-sponsored terror campaign code-named Operation Vermin.

== Politics ==
Boizenburg is, despite not being a part of it itself, the seat of the nearby Amt Boizenburg-Land.

=== City council ===
Boizenburg's city council regularly consists of 25 members but decreased to 21 members after the most recent 2024 Mecklenburg-Vorpommern local elections, held on 9 June 2024, because the Alternative for Germany (AfD) won five seats but only had one candidate, resulting in vacant seats and a decreasing council size. The 2024 city council election yielded the following results:

Party	Votes	Share		Seats		
Party	Votes	%	+/-	Awarded	Filled	+/–
Christian Democratic Union of Germany (CDU)	4,310	28.79	▼3.69	7	7	▼1
Alternative for Germany (AfD)	2,755	18.40	New	5	1	▲5 (Note: Awarded: ▲5, Filled: ▲1)
Citizen for Boizenburg e. V. (BfB)	2,643	17.66	▼3.70	4	4	▼1
Social Democratic Party of Germany (SPD)	2,587	17.28	▼2.53	4	4	▼1
The Left	1,737	11.60	▼6.27	3	3	▼2
Home and Identity (HuI)	506	3.38	New	1	1	0 (Note: Although HuI is a legally independent group, its personnel is nearly identical with that of The Homeland which partook in the last election under its old name National Democratic Party of Germany (NPD) where it won one seat (meaning a seat change of 0 or a percentage change of ▼1.79).)
Ind. Christine Dyrba	432	2.89	New	1	1	▲1
Total	14,970	100.0		25	21	▼4
Valid votes	14,970	95.74				
Invalid/blank votes	218	1.39				
Total votes	15,188	100.0				
Turnout	5,212	55.09	▼6.83			
Eligible voters	9,461					

=== Mayor ===
- 1990-1996: Uwe Wieben
- 2000–2022: Harald Jäschke (independent)
- since 2022: Rico Reichelt (SPD)

== Twin towns ==
Boizenburg is twinned with:

- Czersk, Poland
- Lauenburg, Germany

== Sights ==
One of the advantages of Boizenburg's isolation during the Cold War is the pristine natural landscape of the Elbe Valley region stretching to the north, south and east. Much of the architecture and infrastructure in the old city remained 'perfectly untouched' during the DDR regime. In addition to significant restoration projects, new installations such as the modern redesign of the harbor and the addition of a topiary garden have greatly added to the old town's charm.

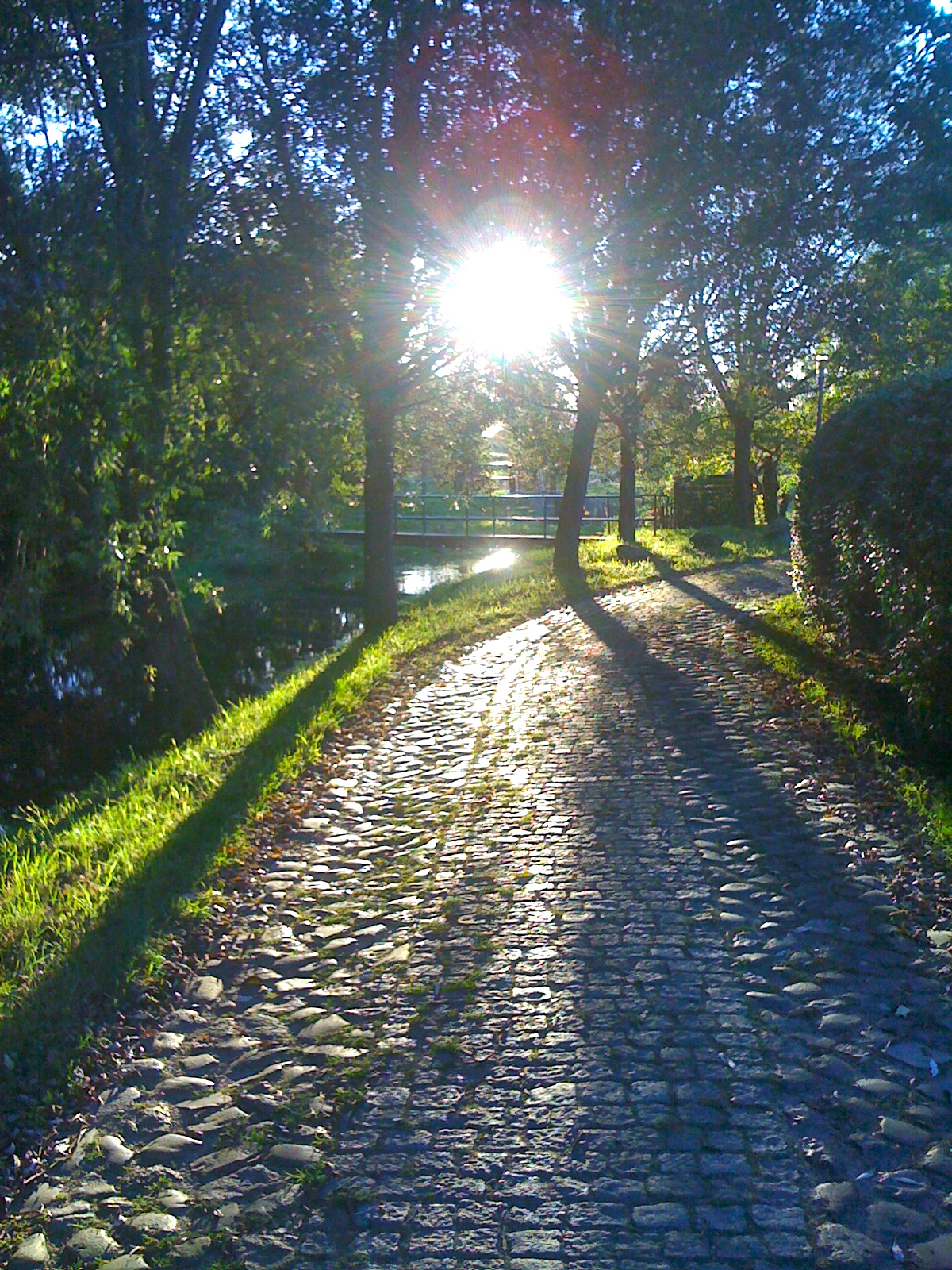
Old Moat on the Bollenberg

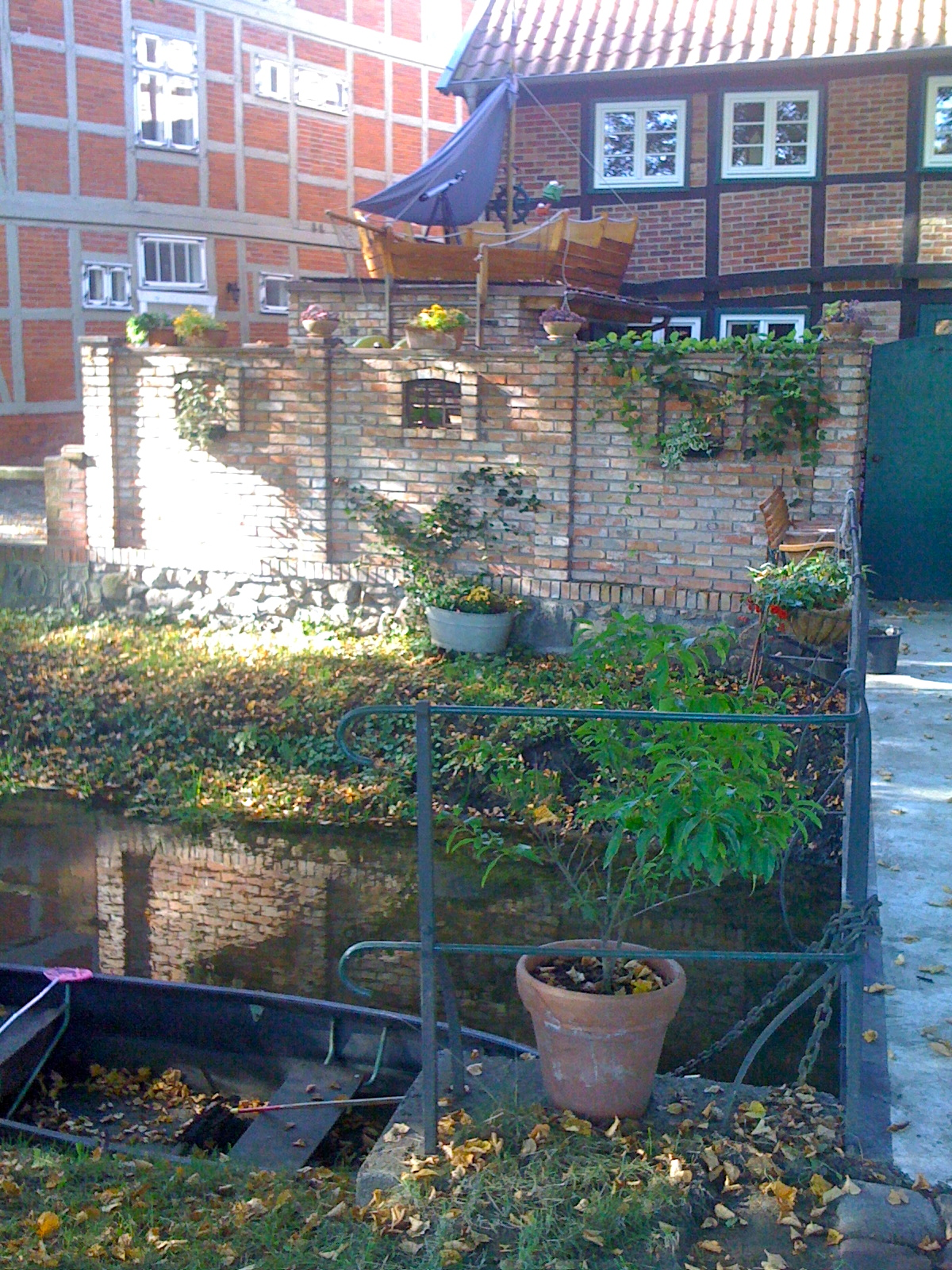
Ship model along the Old Moat

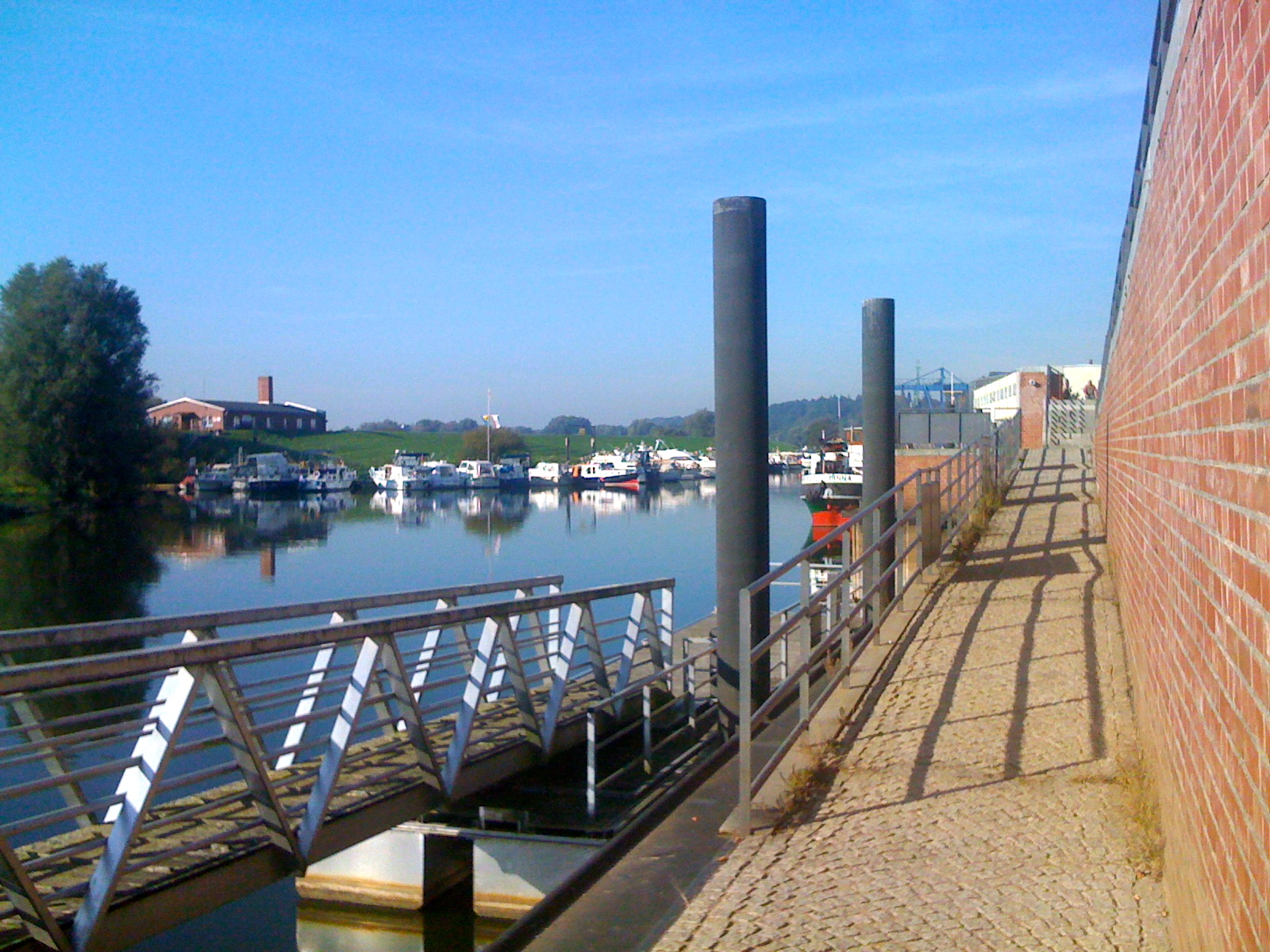
Boizenburg Harbour looking towards the Elbe and shipbuilding docks

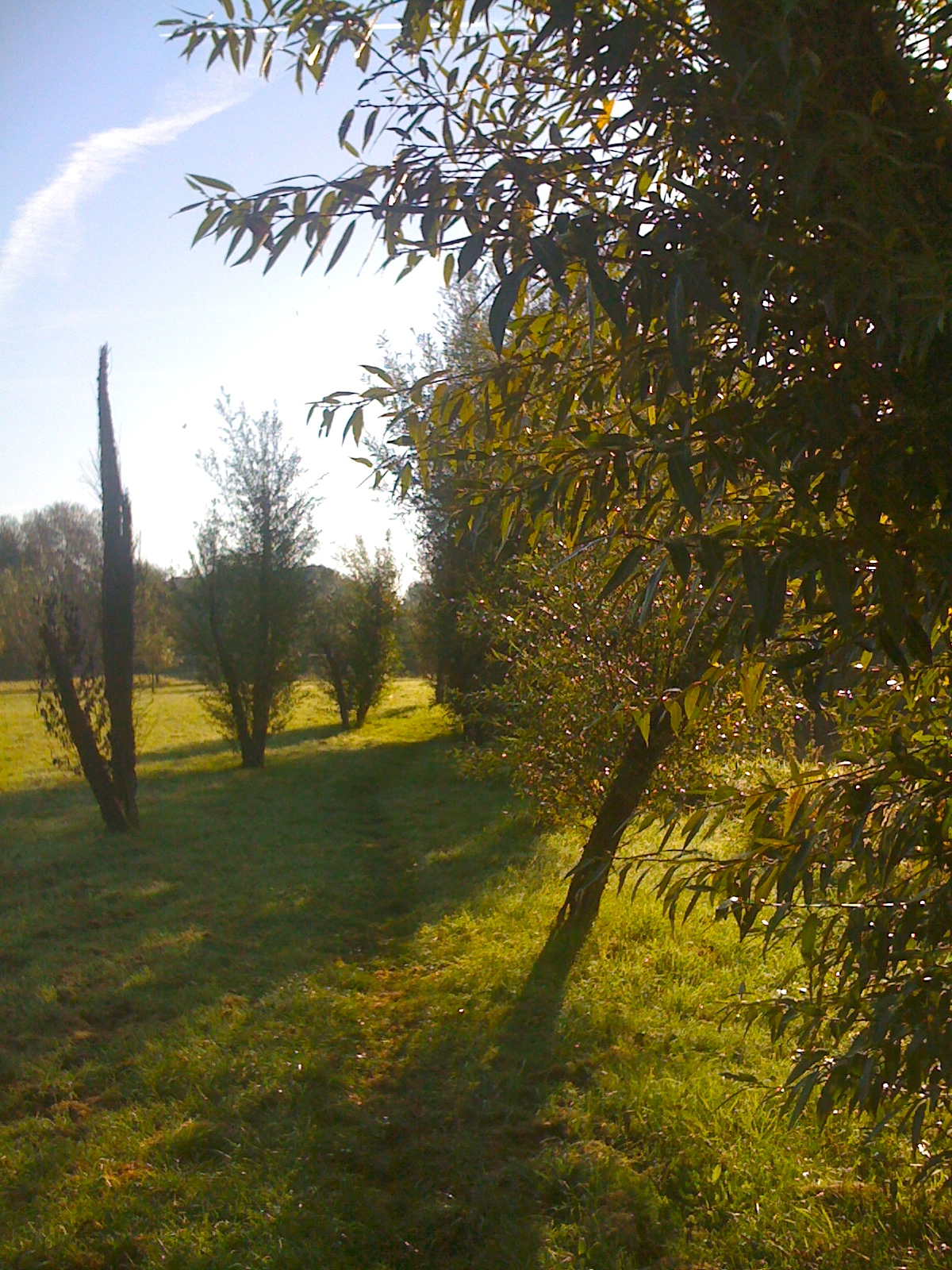
Topiary garden

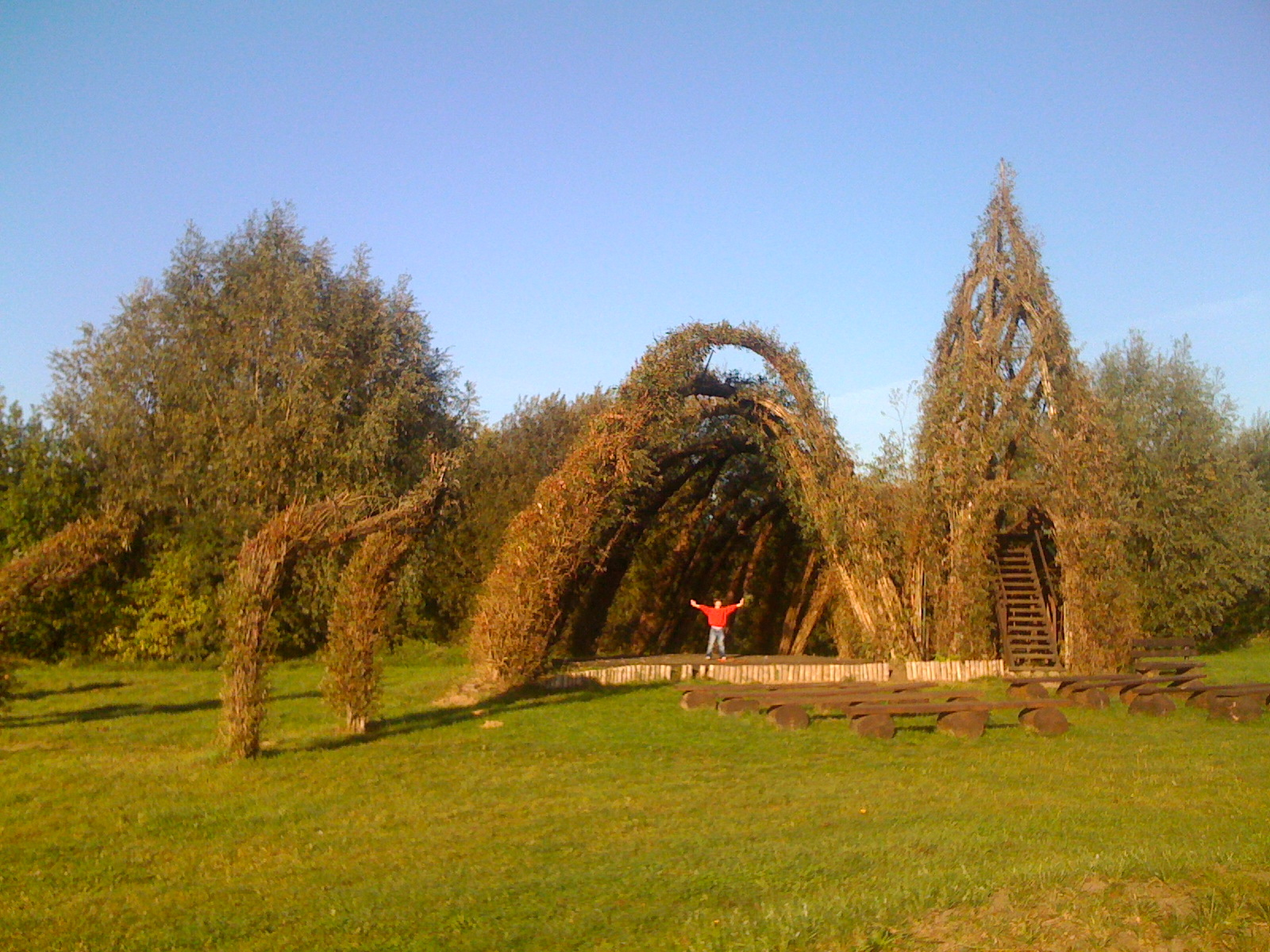
Topiary garden: water snail

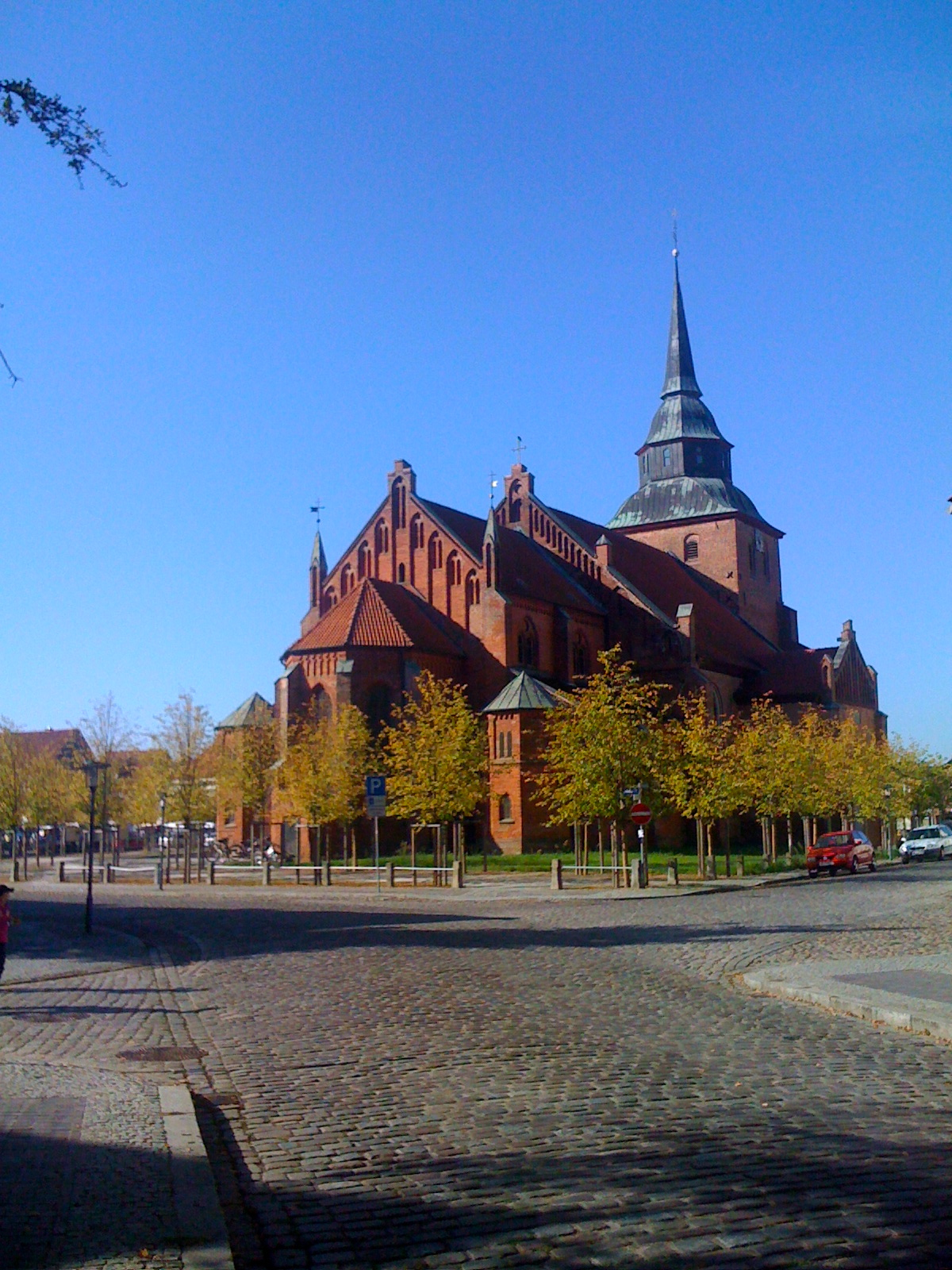
View of the East wing of the St. Marien Church

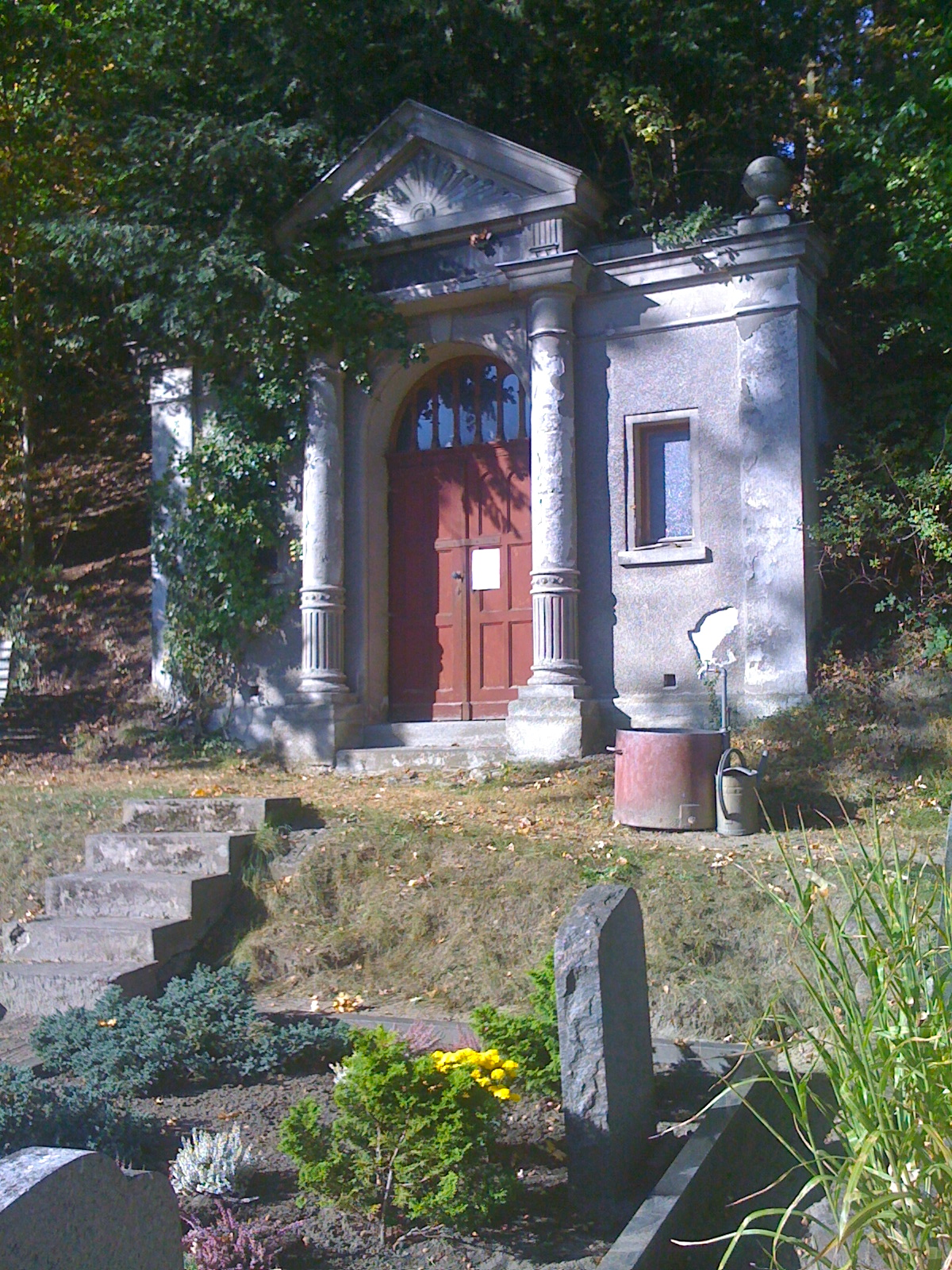
Mausoleum in Boizenburg's Graveyard

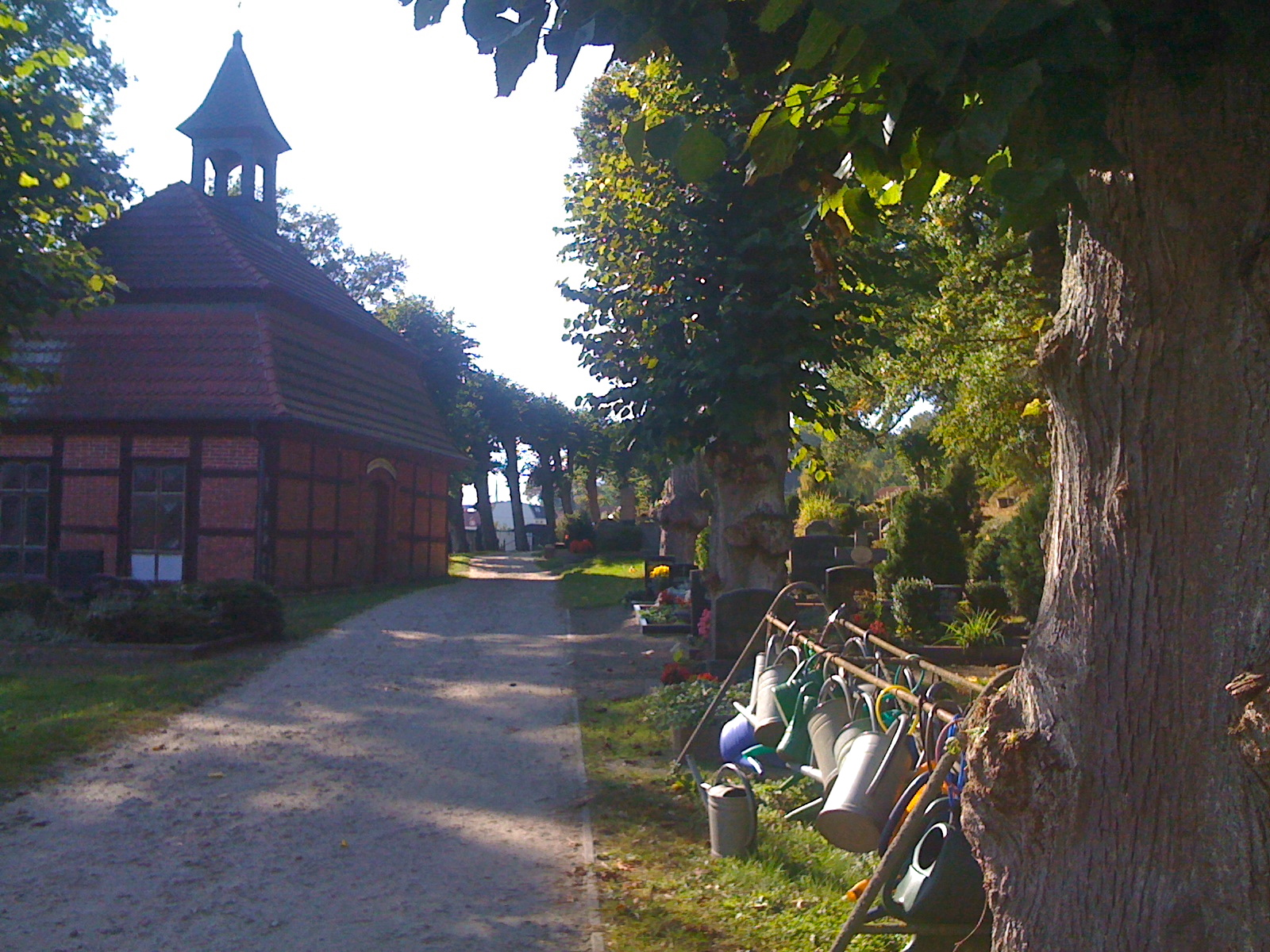
Path in Boizenburg's Graveyard

== Notable people ==
- Georg Christian Benedict Ackermann (1763–1833), theologian and teacher
- Hermann Burmeister (1849–1935), jurist, 40 years (1879-1919) mayor of Boizenburg, since 1922 honorary citizen
- Leonhard Adelt (1881–1945), bookseller, writer and journalist
- Heinrich Laag (1892–1972), Evangelical theologian
- Rüdiger Beckhaus (born 1955), chemist
