= Till Backhaus =

German politician (born 1959)

Till Backhaus MdL MdBR
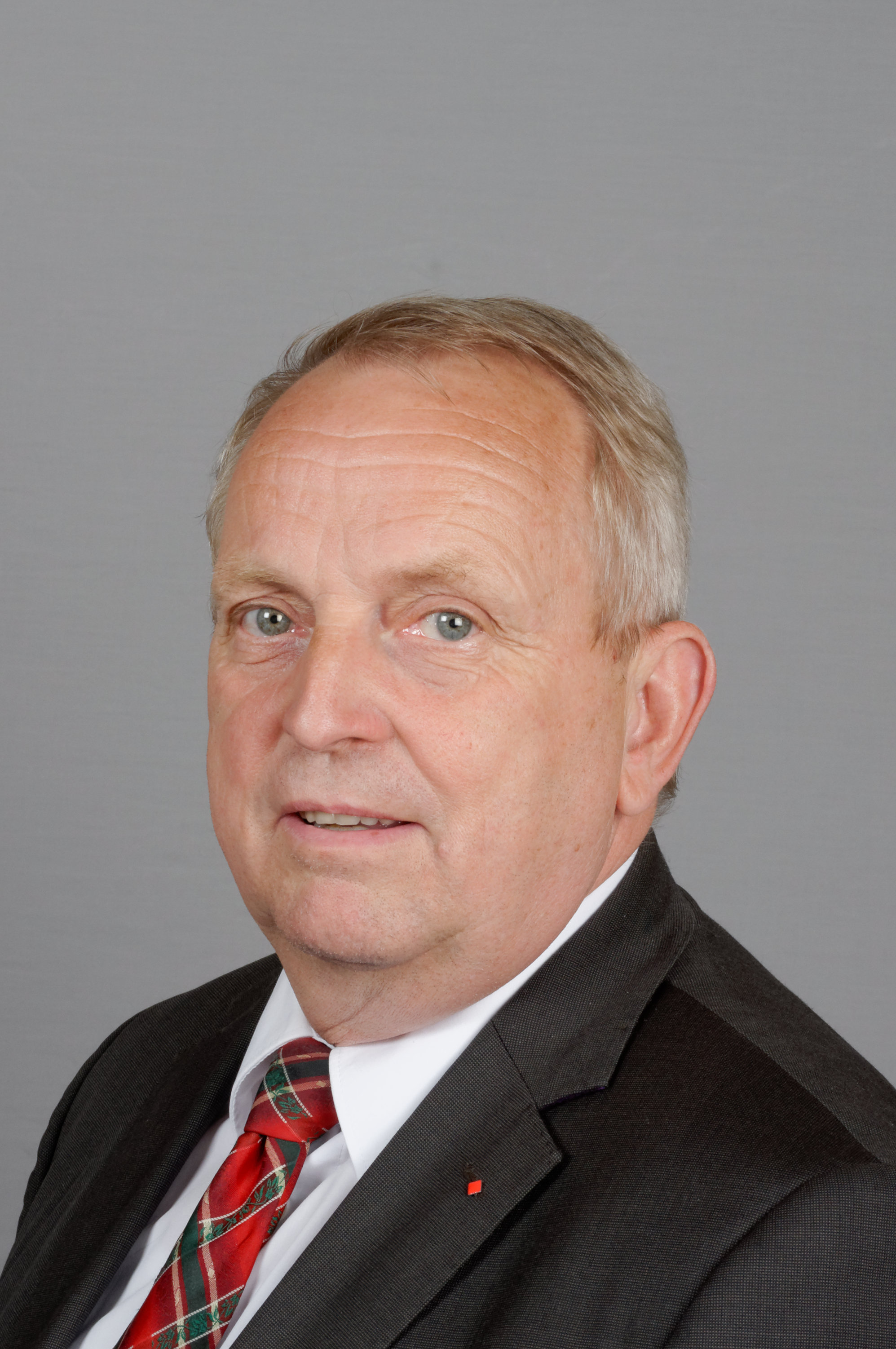
- (2017)

Minister for Agriculture and Environment of Mecklenburg-Vorpommern (Note: Office became known as "Minister for Food, Agriculture, Forestry and Fisheries" from 1998 to 2006 and "Minister for Agriculture, Environment and Consumer Protection" from 2007 to 2016.)
- Incumbent
- Assumed office 3 November 1998
- Minister-President: Harald Ringstorff; Erwin Sellering; Manuela Schwesig
- Preceded by: Martin Brick (Environment and Conservation)

Leader of the Social Democratic Party in Mecklenburg-Vorpommern
- In office 2003–2007
- Preceded by: Harald Ringstorff
- Succeeded by: Erwin Sellering

Member of the Landtag of Mecklenburg-Vorpommern for Ludwigslust-Parchim I (Ludwigslust I; 1994–2015) (Social Democratic List; 1990–1994)
- Incumbent
- Assumed office 26 October 1990
- Preceded by: Paul-Friedrich Leopold (Ludwigslust)

Member of the Volkskammer for Schwerin
- In office 5 April 1990 – 2 October 1990
- Preceded by: Constituency established
- Succeeded by: Constituency abolished

Personal details
- Born: 13 March 1959 (age 67) Amt Neuhaus, Mecklenburg-Vorpommern, GDR (East Germany)
- Party: SDP (1989-1990); SPD (1990 to date)
- Occupation: Politician

Till Backhaus (born Neuhaus 13 March 1959) is a German politician. As the German Democratic Republic approached its end as a standalone state, Backhaus was one of those who in December 1989 (re)founded the Social Democratic Party, more than four decades after its suppression.

More recently, in 1998 he was appointed State Minister for Agriculture in Mecklenburg-Vorpommern, a post he retains, making him the longest serving state minister currently (2026) in office in Germany.

== Early life and career ==
Till Backhaus was born at Neuhaus, roughly 3 km (2 miles) to the east of Elbe River, which at that time marked the Inner German border dividing East from West Germany, and which through the 1950s was being increasingly fortified along its eastern bank in order to prevent people escaping from the east to the west. In 1978, Backhaus successfully completed his secondary schooling at nearby Pritzier-Schwechow with a vocational qualification in agro-technology. He spent two years undertaking his military service with the National People's Army before moving on, in 1980, to the University of Rostock where he concluded his studies, in 1985, with a degree in agricultural engineering.

In 1980 he also started working for the Neuhaus Agricultural Production Co-operative, later transferring to the nearby Lübtheen Agricultural Production Co-operative, where he worked as a department head till 1990.

== Political career ==
In December 1989, the month in which even the country's monolithic SED felt the need to participate with the Social Democrats in "round table talks", Backhaus, who hitherto had not engaged in politics, joined the SDP and was a co-founder of its Neuhaus (Elbe) district branch. When, after German reunification in October 1990, the eastern and western branches of the SPD came together into a single national party, Backhaus remained an active party leader in the locality. Reflecting administrative boundary changes, he was district party chairman for the SPD in the Hagenow district from 1991 until 1994 and for the Hagenow-Ludwigslust district from 1994 until 2003.

At the regional level, between 2003 and 2007 he served as Chairman for Mecklenburg-Vorpommern region SPD group and a member of the leadership team between 2005 and 2007. He has been a leading spokesman for the regional party on consumer affairs, food, and agriculture.

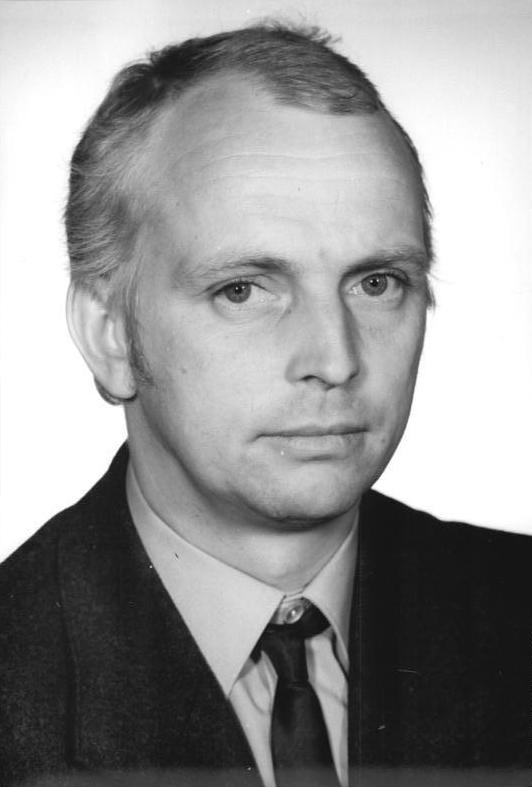
Till Backhaus (1990)

Between March and October 1990, Backhaus sat as one of the 91 SPD members of the German Democratic Republic's first (and last) freely elected representative in the People's Chamber (Volkskammer).

At the regional level, he has, since 1990, sat as a member of the Mecklenburg-Vorpommern regional legislative assembly. Between 1990 and 1994. he was elected from the SPD Mecklenburg-Vorpommern regional list, and since 1994 he has represented the "Ludwigslust I" subdivision electoral district within the Mecklenburg-Vorpommern region. Within the assembly, between 1992 and 1998, he was chairman of the Agriculture Committee, and from 1994 until 1998 of the Agriculture and Nature Protection committee.

At the local level he was, between 2004 and 2006, a member of the local council for the Ludwigslust district.

=== State Minister of Agriculture, 1998–present ===
After the 1998 regional election, Backhaus was offered the position of State Minister for Food, Agriculture, Forestry and Fisheries for Mecklenburg-Vorpommern in the regional administration headed up, at that time, by his party colleague Harald Ringstorff. Backhaus accepted the post, and retained it (now with consumer protection and environmental protection added to the portfolio) it after 7 November 2006 when, controversially, the Mecklenburg-Vorpommern SPD entered into a ruling coalition with the CDU, following regional election results that had been disappointing for both parties.

As one of the state’s representatives at the Bundesrat, Backhaus is a member of the Committee on Agricultural Policy and Consumer Protection and of the Committee on Environment, Nature Conservation and Nuclear Safety.

Together with Elke Ferner, Wolfgang Jüttner, Ute Vogt, and Klaus Wowereit, Backhaus co-chaired the SPD’s 2006 national convention in Berlin.

== Other activities ==
- Landwirtschaftliche Rentenbank, Member of the Supervisory Board
- Landgesellschaft Mecklenburg-Vorpommern mbH, Chairman of the Supervisory Board

== The long word ==
Mecklenburg-Vorpommern is a relatively rural state and the Agriculture Ministry has given Backhaus a high ministerial profile in the region. In 1999, his department came up with a legislative proposal which broke records for an unusual reason.

The Rindfleischetikettierungsüberwachungsaufgabenübertragungsgesetz (a law on the supervision of beef labelling) is defined using a grammatically valid and usable compound noun of 63 letters. The word featured in the Guinness Book of Records until 1996, when it was controversially challenged for the top spot by the creation of a longer word. But for many, the word created by Backhaus's ministry was toppled from its position as Germany's longest official word only in 2013 when it was withdrawn from use by the regional assembly because the law it defined had been repealed.

== Controversies ==
In 2015, as the minister responsible, Backhaus was called upon to make a ministerial statement after the (presumably temporary) closure of Rostock zoo in the wake of a bird flu scare which had necessitated the precautionary killing of storks, ducks, and a red ibis. This was not the first bird flu scare in the region to necessitate ministerial intervention. In the preceding fifteen years, his intervention has frequently been invoked in other food, agricultural, and environment related scares.

A more personal media controversy arose in respect of the Doctorate in Agriculture which Backhaus received from Berlin's Humboldt University in 2001. His dissertation was entitled "Reflections on Grain Production in Mecklenburg-Vorpommern between 1900 and 2000". Sources are silent over when the work was started, but public reaction may have been triggered by the fact that by the time he actually received the doctorate Backhaus had already been the regional Minister for Agriculture for more than two years. The Agriculture Scientist Wilhelm Römer went public with his opinion that the dissertation was an "insubstantial compilation" without "formal scientific substance" ("substanzlos[es] Machwerk ... [der] ... weder inhaltlich noch formal wissenschaftlichen Ansprüchen [entspräche]"). There was also criticism that the dissertation had been supervised in 2000 and 2001 by Norbert Makowski, a distinguished plant-scientist who at the time was alleged to have been undertaking paid consultancy work indirectly involving the ministry.

== Personal life ==
Till Backhaus has three children from two of his three marriages. He married his third wife, Ivonne Menzel, in June 2012. Press attention focused not on her career as a dentist, but on her youth and her recent celebrity as a beauty queen.
