= Brahlstorf =

- Municipality
- Location of Brahlstorf within Ludwigslust-Parchim district
- Interactive map of Brahlstorf
- Location within Germany Location within Mecklenburg-Vorpommern
- Coordinates: 53°22′N 10°55′E
- Country: Germany
- State: Mecklenburg-Vorpommern
- District: Ludwigslust-Parchim
- Municipal assoc.: Boizenburg-Land
- Subdivisions: 2

Government
  - Mayor: Gerhard Wartmann

Area
  - Total: 21.95 km^{2} (8.47 sq mi)
- Elevation: 12 m (39 ft)

Population (2025-12-31)
  - Total: 688
  - Density: 31.3/km^{2} (81.2/sq mi)
- Time zone: UTC+01:00 (CET)
  - Summer (DST): UTC+02:00 (CEST)
- Postal codes: 19273
- Dialling codes: 038848
- Vehicle registration: LWL
- Website: www.amtboizenburgland.de

Brahlstorf is a municipality in the Ludwigslust-Parchim district, in Mecklenburg-Vorpommern, Germany.
