= Boizenburg-Land =

- Amt
- Map of Ludwigslust-Parchim highlighting Boizenburg-Land
- Interactive map of Boizenburg-Land
- Location within Germany Location within Mecklenburg-Vorpommern
- Coordinates: 53°22′N 10°47′E
- Country: Germany
- State: Mecklenburg-Vorpommern
- District: Ludwigslust-Parchim
- Seat: Boizenburg
- Subdivisions: 11 municipalities

Area
  - Total: 258.45 km^{2} (99.79 sq mi)

Population (2025-12-31)
  - Total: 6,582
  - Density: 25.47/km^{2} (65.96/sq mi)
- Time zone: UTC+01:00 (CET)
  - Summer (DST): UTC+02:00 (CEST)
- Website: www.amtboizenburgland.de

Boizenburg-Land is an Amt in the Ludwigslust-Parchim district, in Mecklenburg-Vorpommern, Germany. The seat of the Amt is in Boizenburg, itself not part of the Amt.

The Amt Boizenburg-Land consists of the following municipalities:

1. Bengerstorf
2. Besitz
3. Brahlstorf
4. Dersenow
5. Gresse
6. Greven
7. Neu Gülze
8. Nostorf
9. Schwanheide
10. Teldau
11. Tessin bei Boizenburg
