= Dümmer See =

Lake in Mecklenburg-Vorpommern, Germany

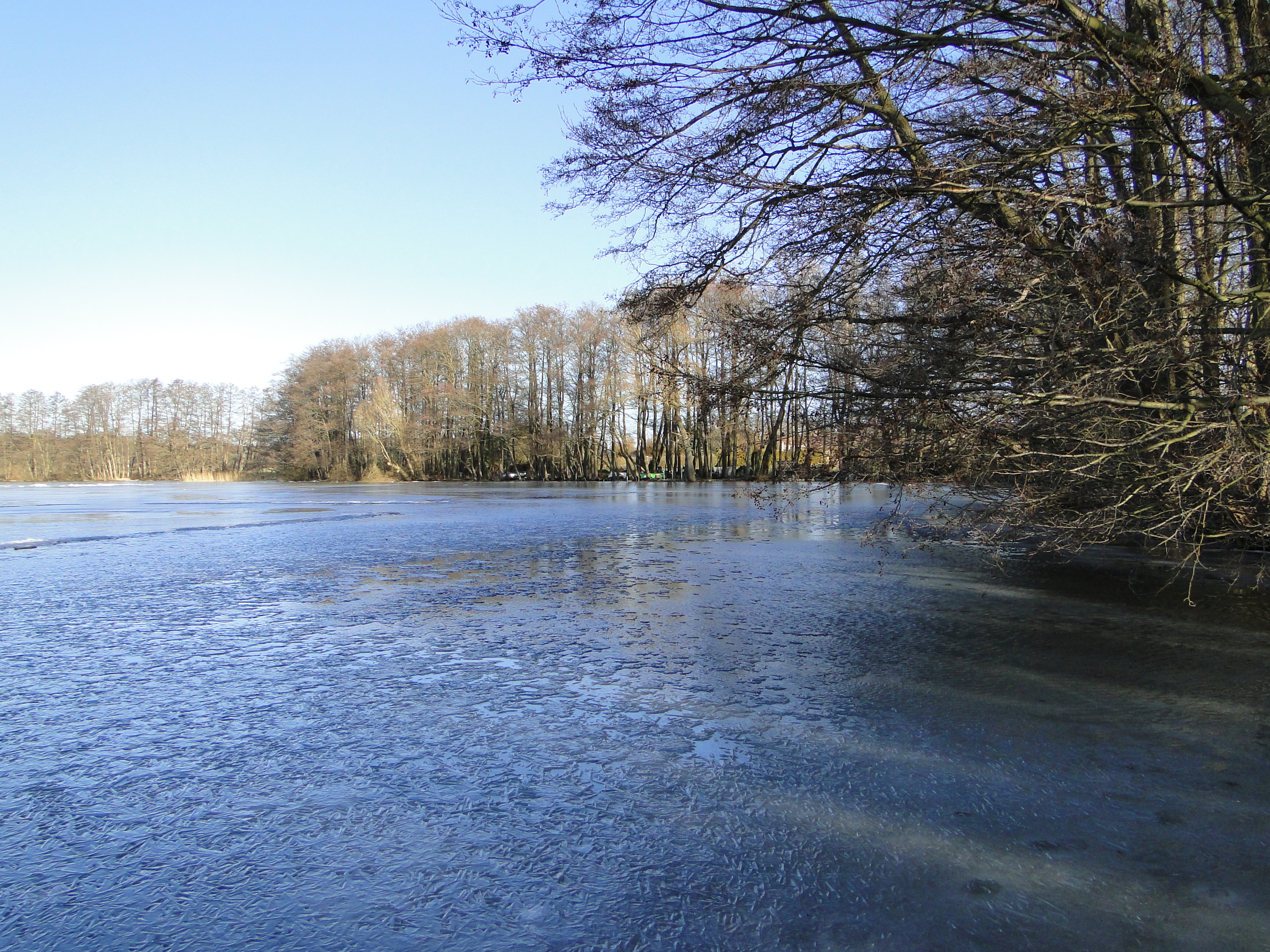
- Frozen lake in February 2012

- Location within Mecklenburg-Vorpommern Location within Germany
- Location: Nordwestmecklenburg, Ludwigslust, Mecklenburg-Vorpommern
- Coordinates: 53°34′53″N 11°12′10″E
- Primary inflows: subterrean
- Primary outflows: Sude
- Basin countries: Germany
- Surface area: 1.59 km^{2} (0.61 sq mi)
- Average depth: 7.9 m (26 ft)
- Max. depth: 21.3 m (70 ft)
- Surface elevation: 45.5 m (149 ft)

Dümmer See is a lake in Nordwestmecklenburg and Ludwigslust-Parchim, Mecklenburg-Vorpommern, Germany. At an elevation of 45.5 m, its surface area is 1.59 km^{2}.
