= Greven, Mecklenburg-Vorpommern =

Greven
- Municipality
- Location of Greven within Ludwigslust-Parchim district
- Interactive map of Greven
- Location within Germany Location within Mecklenburg-Vorpommern
- Coordinates: 53°28′N 10°48′E
- Country: Germany
- State: Mecklenburg-Vorpommern
- District: Ludwigslust-Parchim
- Municipal assoc.: Boizenburg-Land
- Subdivisions: 4

Government
  - Mayor: Christa Lichtner

Area
  - Total: 40.00 km^{2} (15.44 sq mi)
- Elevation: 30 m (98 ft)

Population (2025-12-31)
  - Total: 816
  - Density: 20.4/km^{2} (52.8/sq mi)
- Time zone: UTC+01:00 (CET)
  - Summer (DST): UTC+02:00 (CEST)
- Postal codes: 19258
- Dialling codes: 038842, 038843
- Vehicle registration: LWL
- Website: www.amtboizenburgland.de

Greven (German pronunciation: [ˈɡʁeːvn̩]) is a municipality in the Ludwigslust-Parchim district, in Mecklenburg-Vorpommern, Germany.
