= Leonhard Adelt =

German writer

Leonhard Adelt (17 June 1881, Boizenburg – 21 February 1945) was a German translator and writer.
