= Boize =

River in Germany

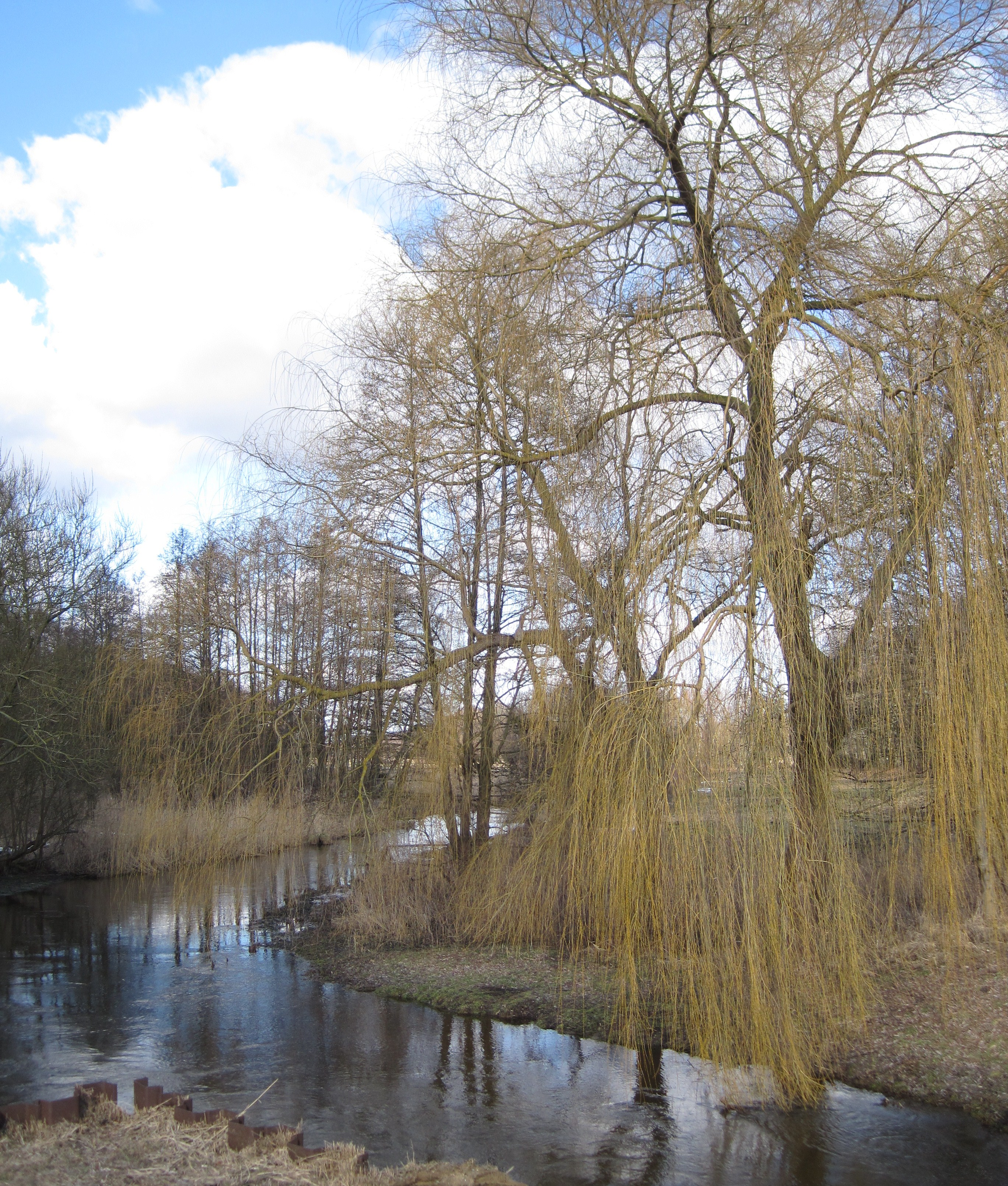

Location
- Country: Germany
- States: Schleswig-Holstein and Mecklenburg-Vorpommern

Physical characteristics
- Mouth
  - location: Sude
  - coordinates: 53.3737°N 10.6973°E

Basin features
- Progression: Sude→ Elbe→ North Sea

Boize is a river of Schleswig-Holstein and Mecklenburg-Vorpommern, Germany. It flows into the Sude in Boizenburg.

== See also ==
- List of rivers of Schleswig-Holstein
- List of rivers of Mecklenburg-Vorpommern
