= Krainke =

River in Germany

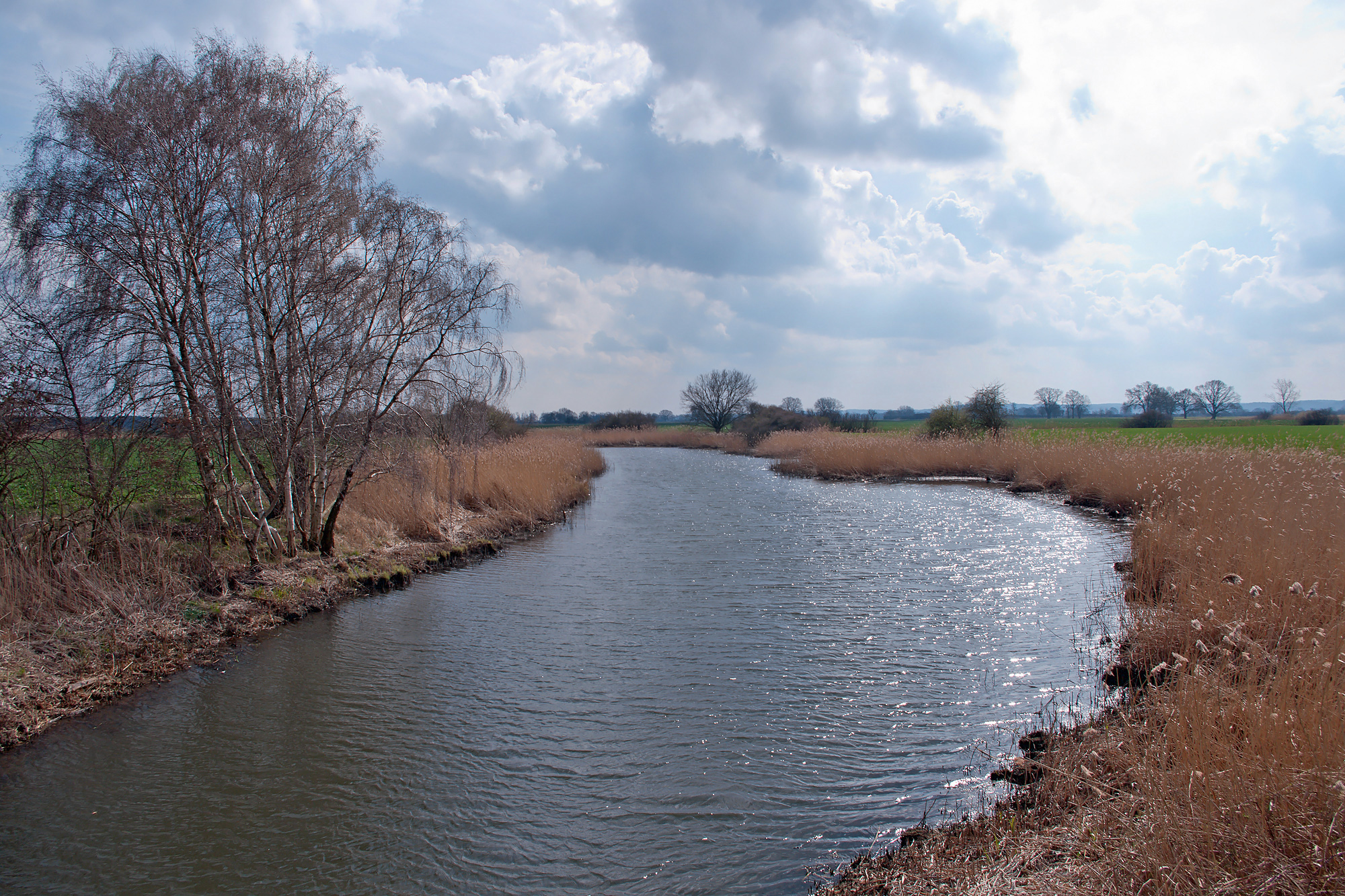

Location
- Country: Germany
- States: Mecklenburg-Vorpommern; Lower Saxony

Physical characteristics
- Mouth
  - location: Sude
  - coordinates: 53.3354°N 10.8804°E
- Length: 33.9 km (21.1 mi)
- Basin size: 125 km^{2} (48 sq mi)

Basin features
- Progression: Sude→ Elbe→ North Sea

The Krainke (German pronunciation: [ˈkʁaɪŋkə]) is a river of Mecklenburg-Vorpommern and Lower Saxony, Germany. It flows into the Sude near Besitz.

== See also ==
- List of rivers of Mecklenburg-Vorpommern
- List of rivers of Lower Saxony
