= Georg Christian Benedict Ackermann =

German theologian and teacher

Georg Christian Benedict Ackermann (3 March 1763 – 8 April 1833) was a German theologian and teacher.

He was born in Vier (now part of Boizenburg) upon the river Elbe. He visited school in Schwerin in Mecklenburg, then in 1782 the University of Göttingen in Hanover to study theology.

In 1792, Ackermann collaborated at the regional teacher seminary in Ludwigslust. Later, he became teacher of Frederick Louis, Duke of Schleswig-Holstein-Sonderburg-Beck and controller of the court. In 1801 second preacher of the court, in 1808 superintendent in Schwerin and rector of the Domschule. In 1819 councillor of the consistory, in 1830 first preacher of the court.

Ackermann was engaged in ameliorating the public school system, orphanages, and poor houses. Aside from his sermons, he published in the Monatsschrift von Mecklenburg, in Schiller's Patriotisches Archiv der Herzogtümer Mecklenburg and in the Schweriner freimütiges Abendblatt.

== Sources ==
- Friedrich Brüssow: "Georg Christ. Benedict Ackermann". In: Neuer Nekrolog der Deutschen 11/I (1833), Weimar: Voigt 1835, pp. 247–252
- Johann Friedrich Ludwig Theodor Merzdorf (1875). "Ackermann, Georg" . Allgemeine Deutsche Biographie (in German). Vol. 1. Leipzig: Duncker & Humblot. p. 34.
- Grewolls, Grete (2011). Wer war wer in Mecklenburg und Vorpommern. Das Personenlexikon (in German). Rostock: Hinstorff Verlag. p. 27. ISBN 978-3-356-01301-6.
