= Zare =

River in Mecklenburg-Vorpommern, Germany

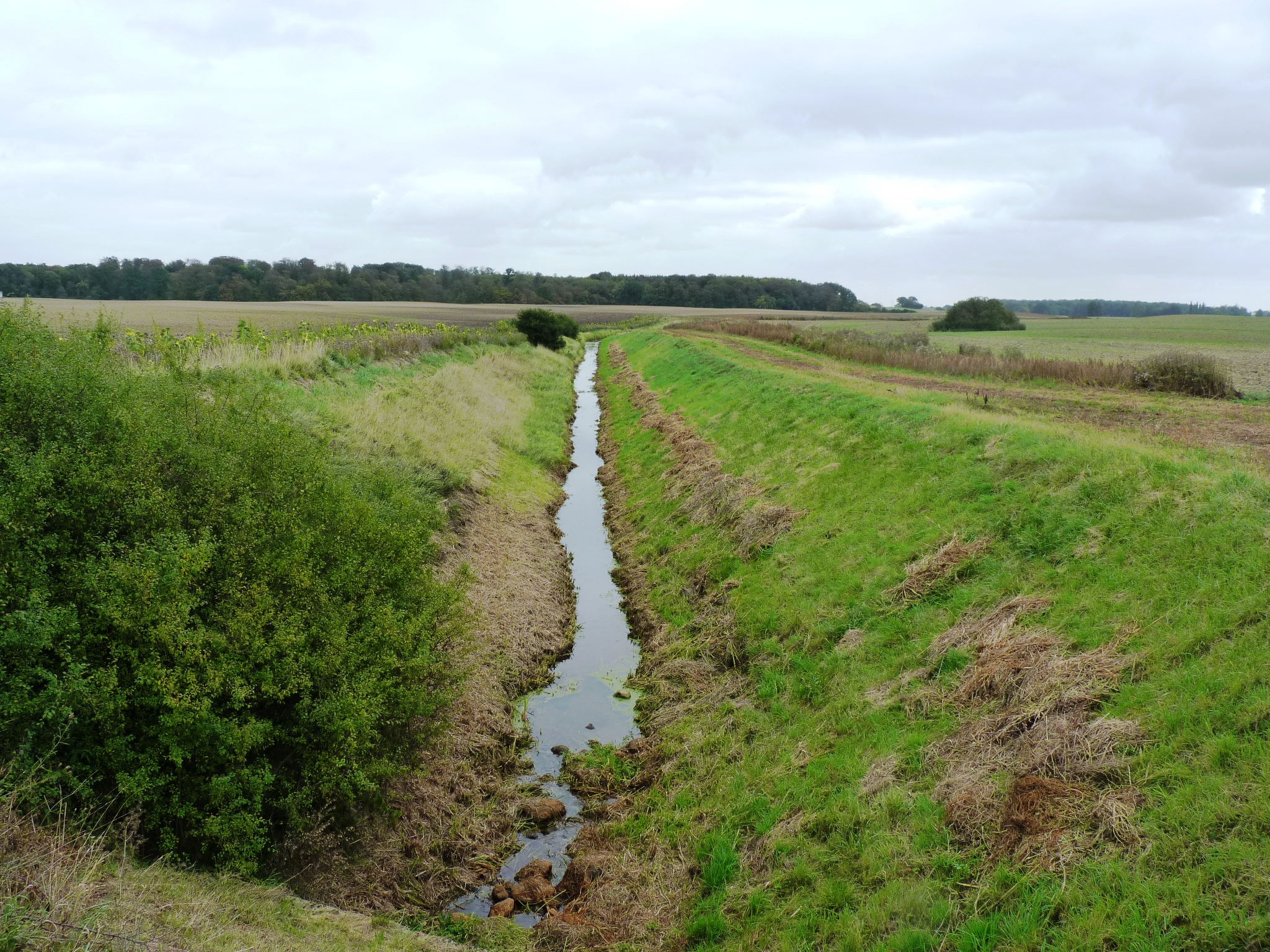

- Mouth of the Zare

Location
- Country: Germany
- State: Mecklenburg-Vorpommern

Physical characteristics
- Mouth
  - location: Sude
  - coordinates: 53.5728°N 11.2521°E

Basin features
- Progression: Sude→ Elbe→ North Sea

The Zare (German pronunciation: [ˈtsaːʁə]) is a river in Mecklenburg-Vorpommern, Germany. It flows into the Sude near Walsmühlen.

== See also ==
- List of rivers of Mecklenburg-Vorpommern
