= Rögnitz (river) =

River in Germany

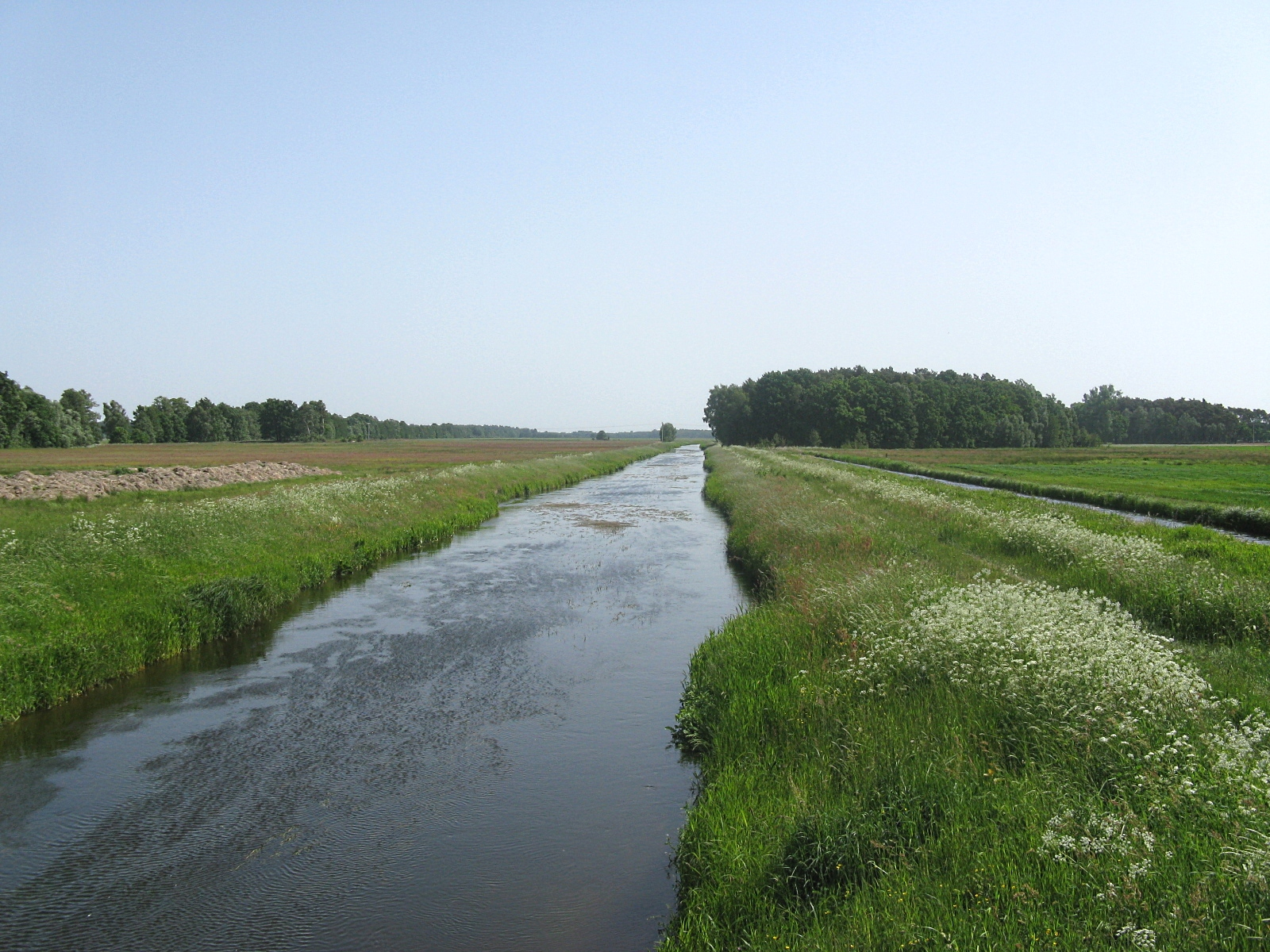

Location
- Country: Germany
- States: Mecklenburg-Vorpommern; Lower Saxony

Physical characteristics
- Mouth
  - location: Sude
  - coordinates: 53.3182°N 10.9491°E
- Length: 52 km (32 mi)

Basin features
- Progression: Sude→ Elbe→ North Sea
- Tributaries
  - right: Ludwigsluster Kanal

Rögnitz is a river located in the German states of Mecklenburg-Vorpommern and Lower Saxony. The river is a tributary of the Sude, which it joins in the village of Sückau. It is part of the Elbe river basin and contributes to the hydrological system of the region.

== Geography ==
The Rögnitz originates in the state of Mecklenburg-Vorpommern and flows predominantly in a southwest direction. It passes through several small villages and natural landscapes before merging with the Sude.

== Ecology ==
The river supports diverse ecosystems, hosting various fish species and contributing to the biodiversity of the Sude river system.

== See also ==
- List of rivers of Mecklenburg-Vorpommern
- List of rivers of Lower Saxony
