= Neu Gülze =

- Municipality
- Location of Neu Gülze within Ludwigslust-Parchim district
- Interactive map of Neu Gülze
- Location within Germany Location within Mecklenburg-Vorpommern
- Coordinates: 53°22′N 10°46′E
- Country: Germany
- State: Mecklenburg-Vorpommern
- District: Ludwigslust-Parchim
- Municipal assoc.: Boizenburg-Land
- Subdivisions: 3

Government
  - Mayor: Hans-Jürgen Michalska

Area
  - Total: 12.97 km^{2} (5.01 sq mi)
- Elevation: 12 m (39 ft)

Population (2025-12-31)
  - Total: 825
  - Density: 63.6/km^{2} (165/sq mi)
- Time zone: UTC+01:00 (CET)
  - Summer (DST): UTC+02:00 (CEST)
- Postal codes: 19258
- Dialling codes: 038844, 038847
- Vehicle registration: LWL
- Website: www.amtboizenburgland.de

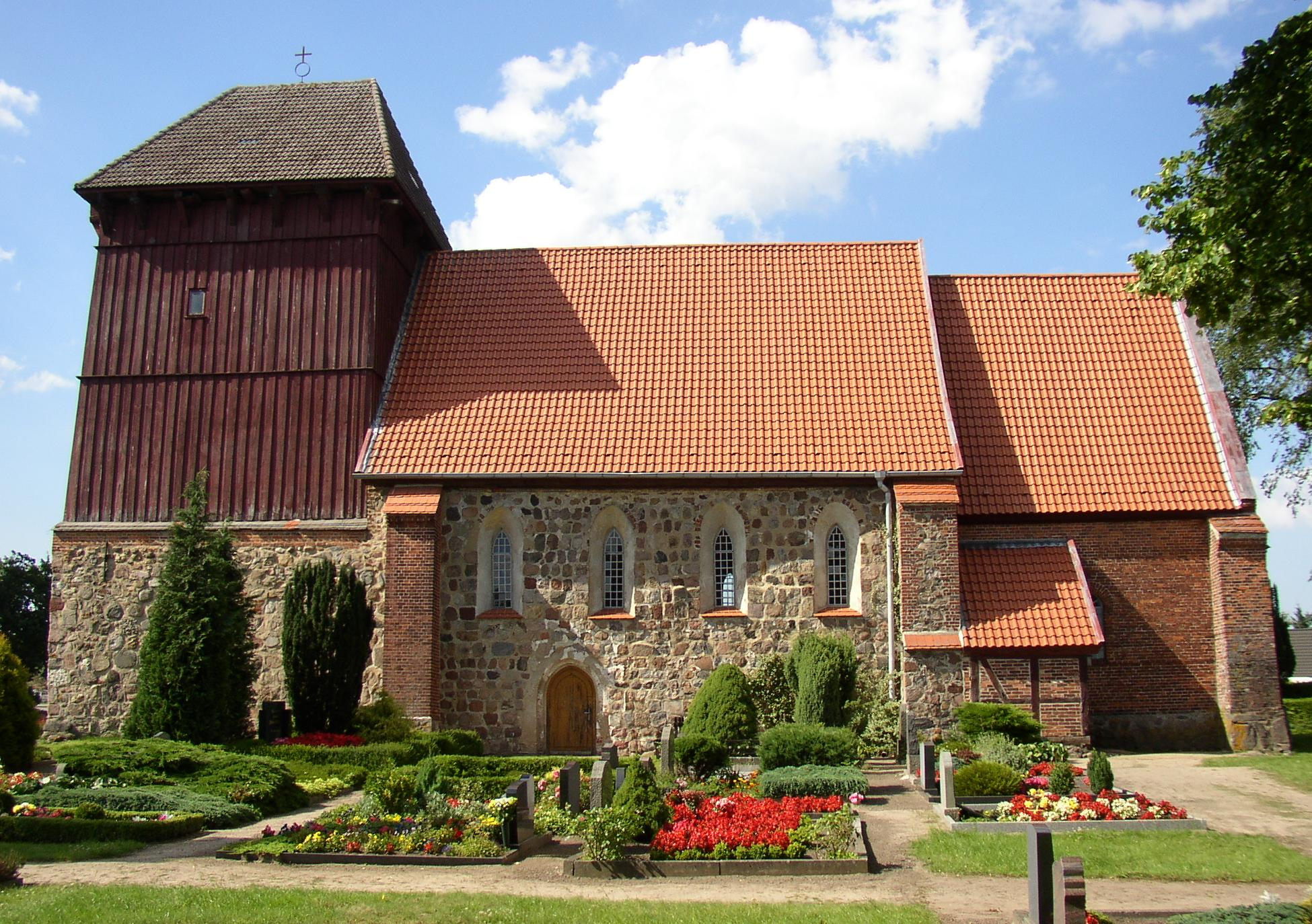
Church in Zahrensdorf

Neu Gülze is a municipality in the Ludwigslust-Parchim district, in Mecklenburg-Vorpommern, Germany.
