= Bahlen, Dinklage =

Bahlen
- Stadtteil of Dinklage
- Interactive map of Bahlen
- Location within Germany Location within Lower Saxony
- Coordinates: 52°40′41″N 8°8′22″E
- Country: Germany
- State: Lower Saxony
- District: Vechta
- Town: Dinklage
- Elevation: 29 m (95 ft)
- Time zone: UTC+01:00 (CET)
  - Summer (DST): UTC+02:00 (CEST)

Bahlen (German pronunciation: [ˈbaːlən]) is a peasantry in the town of Dinklage, in the district of Vechta, in Lower Saxony in Germany.

== Geography ==
Bahlen lies in the northwest of Dinklage.

== Transport ==
Bahlen lies on the A1 freeway (European route E 37) between Bremen and Osnabrück. It can be reached via the exit Lohne / Dinklage.

The nearest train station is located in Lohne. It lies on the Delmenhorst–Hesepe railway, which is operated by the NordWestBahn.

The nearest airport is in Diepholz, the nearest international airports are Bremen Airport (80 km north) and Münster Osnabrück Airport (80 km south).
