= Nostorf =

- Municipality
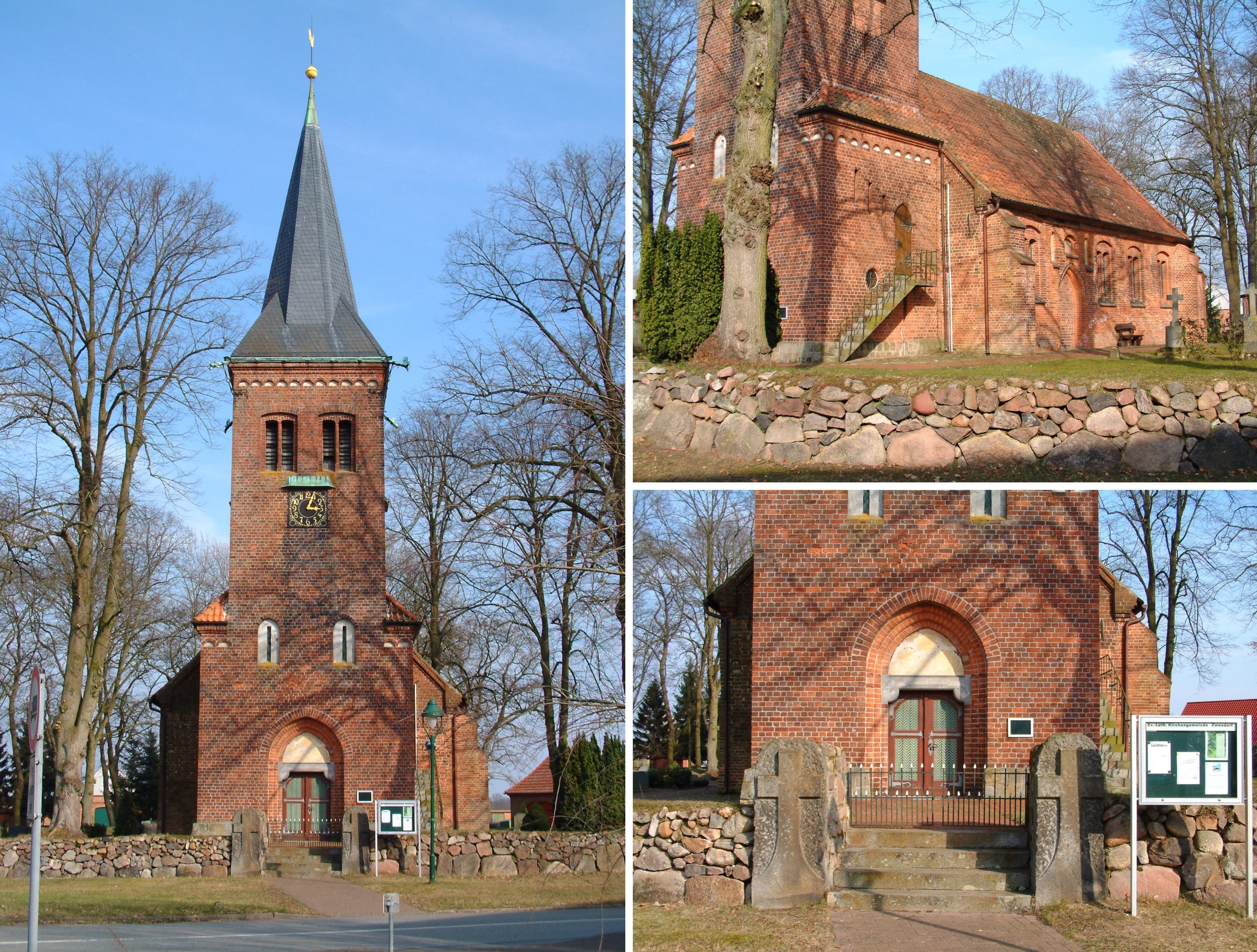
- Nostorf Church

- Location of Nostorf within Ludwigslust-Parchim district
- Interactive map of Nostorf
- Location within Germany Location within Mecklenburg-Vorpommern
- Coordinates: 53°25′N 10°39′E
- Country: Germany
- State: Mecklenburg-Vorpommern
- District: Ludwigslust-Parchim
- Municipal assoc.: Boizenburg-Land
- Subdivisions: 4

Government
  - Mayor: Joachim Kletzin

Area
  - Total: 19.97 km^{2} (7.71 sq mi)
- Elevation: 11 m (36 ft)

Population (2025-12-31)
  - Total: 529
  - Density: 26.5/km^{2} (68.6/sq mi)
- Time zone: UTC+01:00 (CET)
  - Summer (DST): UTC+02:00 (CEST)
- Postal codes: 19258
- Dialling codes: 038847
- Vehicle registration: LWL
- Website: www.amtboizenburgland.de

Nostorf is a municipality in the Ludwigslust-Parchim district of Mecklenburg-Vorpommern, Germany.

== Geography ==
Nostorf is subdivided into four ortsteile, each corresponding to a village and a historical Gemarkung; these are: Nostorf itself, Bickhusen, Horst, and Rensdorf. Another settlement, Nostorf Ausbau, is also located within the municipal territory but belongs to the ortsteil of Nostorf.

== History ==
Between 1945 and 1982 Nostorf's component village of Horst served as East German inner German border crossing for cars travelling along F 5 between the Soviet Zone of occupation in Germany (till 1949, thereafter the East German Democratic Republic), or West Berlin and the British zone of occupation (till 1949) and thereafter the West German Federal Republic of Germany. The traffic was subject to the Interzonal traffic regulations, that between West Germany and West Berlin followed the special regulations of the Transit Agreement (1972). In 1982 the border crossing was closed in favour of a new crossing following the route of today's Bundesautobahn 24 in Zarrentin.
