= Schildetal =

- Municipality
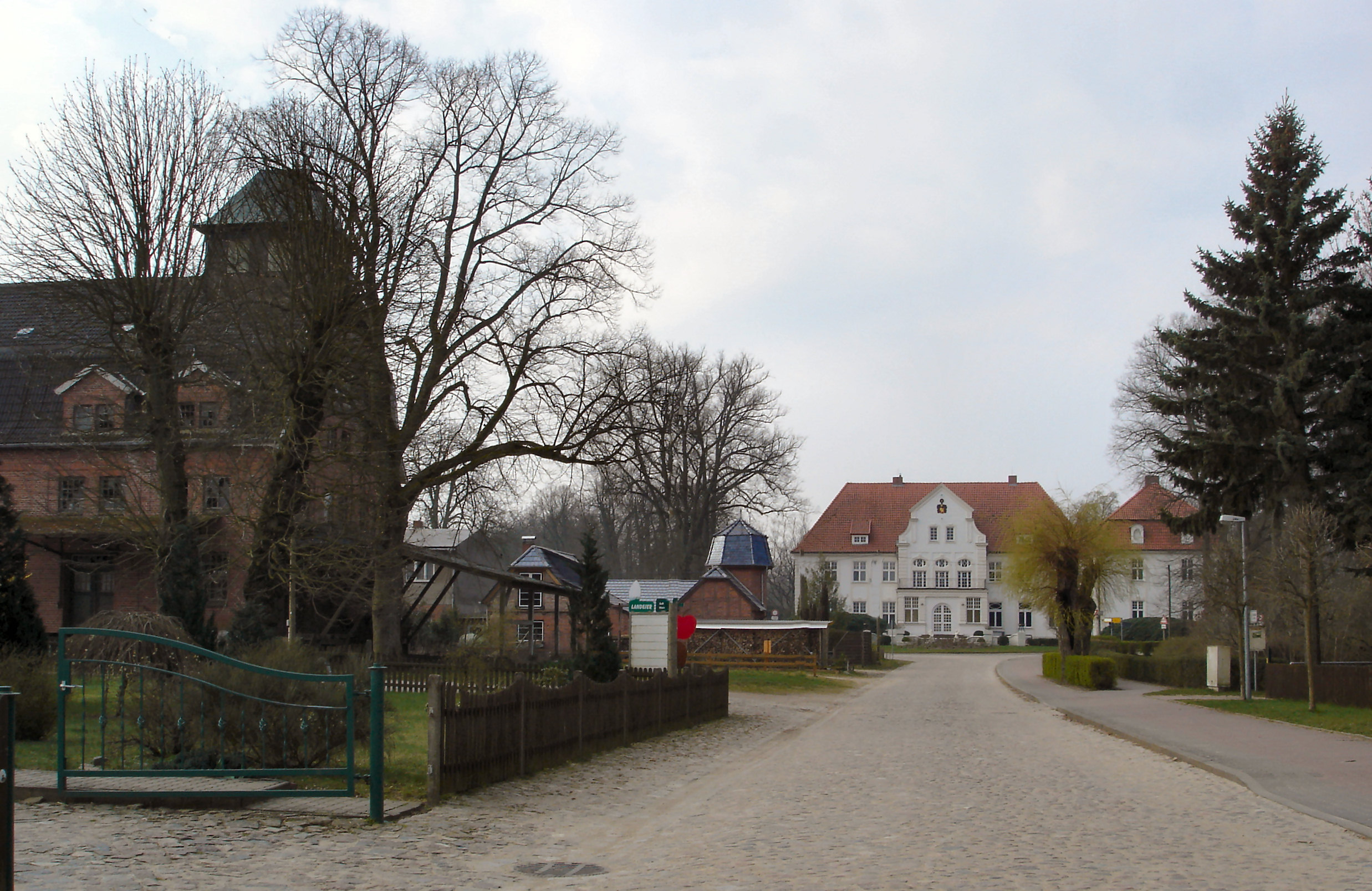
- Gutshaus Badow in Schildetal

- Location of Schildetal within Nordwestmecklenburg district
- Interactive map of Schildetal
- Location within Germany Location within Mecklenburg-Vorpommern
- Coordinates: 53°37′N 11°08′E
- Country: Germany
- State: Mecklenburg-Vorpommern
- District: Nordwestmecklenburg
- Municipal assoc.: Lützow-Lübstorf

Area
  - Total: 19.39 km^{2} (7.49 sq mi)
- Elevation: 44 m (144 ft)

Population (2025-12-31)
  - Total: 709
  - Density: 36.6/km^{2} (94.7/sq mi)
- Time zone: UTC+01:00 (CET)
  - Summer (DST): UTC+02:00 (CEST)
- Postal codes: 19209
- Dialling codes: 038874
- Vehicle registration: NWM
- Website: www.amt-luetzow.de

Schildetal is a municipality in the Nordwestmecklenburg district, in Mecklenburg-Vorpommern, Germany.
