= Besitz =

- Municipality
- Location of Besitz within Ludwigslust-Parchim district
- Interactive map of Besitz
- Location within Germany Location within Mecklenburg-Vorpommern
- Coordinates: 53°21′N 10°52′E
- Country: Germany
- State: Mecklenburg-Vorpommern
- District: Ludwigslust-Parchim
- Municipal assoc.: Boizenburg-Land
- Subdivisions: 2

Government
  - Mayor: Detlef Timm

Area
  - Total: 22.26 km^{2} (8.59 sq mi)
- Elevation: 10 m (33 ft)

Population (2025-12-31)
  - Total: 434
  - Density: 19.5/km^{2} (50.5/sq mi)
- Time zone: UTC+01:00 (CET)
  - Summer (DST): UTC+02:00 (CEST)
- Postal codes: 19258
- Dialling codes: 038844
- Vehicle registration: LWL
- Website: www.amtboizenburgland.de

Besitz (German pronunciation: [ˈbeːzɪts] is a municipality in the Ludwigslust-Parchim district, in Mecklenburg-Vorpommern, Germany.

The municipality consists of two districts - Besitz (first mentioned in 1376) and Blücher (first mentioned in 1230 as Bluggere), a former estate village of the Blücher family. In 1453, this toponym was mentioned as Barsitze.
