= Bahlen, Boizenburg =

Bahlen
- Stadtteil of Boizenburg
- Interactive map of Bahlen
- Location within Germany Location within Mecklenburg-Vorpommern
- Coordinates: 53°22′N 10°46′E
- Country: Germany
- State: Mecklenburg-Vorpommern
- District: Ludwigslust-Parchim
- Town: Boizenburg
- Elevation: 9.75 m (32.0 ft)

Population (2011)
  - Total: 650
- Time zone: UTC+01:00 (CET)
  - Summer (DST): UTC+02:00 (CEST)

Bahlen (German pronunciation: [ˈbaːlən]) is a place in Germany near Ludwigslust. It is one of the town subdivisions (Ortsteile) of Boizenburg, a municipality in the district of Ludwigslust-Parchim, in Mecklenburg-Western Pomerania.

The nearest airport is Lübeck Airport.
