= 2024 Mecklenburg-Vorpommern local elections =

Local elections in Germany

The 2024 Mecklenburg-Vorpommern local elections were held on 7 June 2024 to elect the members of Mecklenburg-Vorpommern's 8 district councils and 726 municipal councils as well as the voluntary mayors (ehrenamtliche Bürgermeister) of 650 municipalities. The elections were held on the same day as the 2024 European Parliament election in Germany.

== Background ==
In accordance with the state Local Election Law (Kommunalwahlgesetz), the government of Mecklenburg-Vorpommern set the election date to be on 7 June 2024, the same date as the European Parliament election in Germany. Runoff elections for mayors were, in accordance with the law, set to be held on 23 June 2024 if necessary.

A new mayor was not elected in municipalities that have a full-time mayor (hauptamtlicher Bürgermeister), due to their position having different term limits varying from seven to nine years. New mayors or municipal councils were also not elected if they entered office within the last 12 months (due to a snap election) or if less than one candidate existed, in which case the election was postponed.

Each voter had three votes that could be amassed all on one candidate, party, or list (accumulation) or could be distributed/split between different candidates, parties, or lists as desired (panachage).

== Results ==
The cumulative result of the district council elections:

Party		Votes		%		Seats			
Party		Votes		%		Awarded		Filled	
Alternative for Germany (AfD)		640,835		25.6		135		135	
Christian Democratic Union of Germany (CDU)		601,361		24.0		126		126	
Social Democratic Party of Germany (SPD)		317,230		12.7		68		68	
The Left (LINKE)		220,829		8.8		47		47	
Local voters' associations	Bürgermeisterliste Landkreis Rostock (BL)	23,884	187,528	1.0	7.5	5	40	5	40
Local voters' associations	Wählergemeinschaft: Landwirte, Unternehmer, Ländlicher Raum (LUL)	17,554	187,528	0.7	7.5	4	40	4	40
Local voters' associations	Bürger für Stralsund	14,900	187,528	0.6	7.5	3	40	3	40
Local voters' associations	Bündnis parteiloser Bürgermeister (BBM)	13,155	187,528	0.5	7.5	3	40	3	40
Local voters' associations	Bürger für Vorpommern-Rügen (BVR)	11,373	187,528	0.5	7.5	2	40	2	40
Local voters' associations	Unabhängige Bürger (UB)	10,617	187,528	0.4	7.5	3	40	3	40
Local voters' associations	Rostocker Bund - Gruppe Bachmann	9,422	187,528	0.4	7.5	2	40	2	40
Local voters' associations	Allianz Bauern und ländlicher Raum (ABLR)	8,935	187,528	0.4	7.5	2	40	2	40
Local voters' associations	BürgerBündnis NWM (BB NWM)	8,176	187,528	0.3	7.5	2	40	2	40
Local voters' associations	Unabhängige Bürger für Rostock (UFR)	7,972	187,528	0.3	7.5	1	40	1	40
Local voters' associations	Für Rügen	6,723	187,528	0.3	7.5	1	40	1	40
Local voters' associations	Aktive Vorpommern	5,750	187,528	0.2	7.5	1	40	1	40
Local voters' associations	Alternative für Ludwigslust (AfL)	5,179	187,528	0.2	7.5	1	40	1	40
Local voters' associations	Initiative Bürgerentscheid Greifswald (IBG)	5,059	187,528	0.2	7.5	1	40	1	40
Local voters' associations	Wählergruppe Heimat und Identität (HuI)	4,225	187,528	0.2	7.5	1	40	1	40
Local voters' associations	Aktionsgruppe Stadt- und Kulturschutz (ASK)	3,181	187,528	0.1	7.5	1	40	1	40
Local voters' associations	Cannabis und Bürgerrechte	2,770	187,528	0.1	7.5	1	40	1	40
Local voters' associations	Vorwärts Altkreis Hagenow (VAH)	2,563	187,528	0.1	7.5	1	40	1	40
Local voters' associations	Wählergemeinschaft ländlicher Raum (WGLR)	2,547	187,528	0.1	7.5	1	40	1	40
Local voters' associations	Wir Leben Demokratie (WLD)	2,452	187,528	0.1	7.5	1	40	1	40
Local voters' associations	Wählergemeinschaft SOZIAL (WG SOZIAL)	2,396	187,528	0.1	7.5	1	40	1	40
Local voters' associations	Kleingärtner und Siedler - Bewohner des ländlichen Raumes (kus)	2,192	187,528	0.1	7.5	1	40	1	40
Local voters' associations	Initiative Zukunft (IZ)	2,040	187,528	0.1	7.5	0	40	0	40
Local voters' associations	Bürger für konservative Werte (BkW)	1,996	187,528	0.1	7.5	1	40	1	40
Local voters' associations	Achtung: STOLZ auf ARBEIT, HEIMAT, RÜGEN AUTARK (A:SAHRA)	1,857	187,528	0.1	7.5	0	40	0	40
Local voters' associations	Aktive Wählergemeinschaft Dobbertin (AWD)	1,746	187,528	0.1	7.5	0	40	0	40
Local voters' associations	Graue Rostock	1,680	187,528	0.1	7.5	0	40	0	40
Local voters' associations	Wählergemeinschaft Wittenhagen	1,364	187,528	0.1	7.5	0	40	0	40
Local voters' associations	Bergener Freie Wähler (BFW)	1,215	187,528	0.0	7.5	0	40	0	40
Local voters' associations	Wählergruppe Adomeit	1,012	187,528	0.0	7.5	0	40	0	40
Local voters' associations	Wählergruppe Gemeinde Plate (WGP)	674	187,528	0.0	7.5	0	40	0	40
Local voters' associations	Bürgerbündnis mit Kompetenz für Vorpommern (BB)	971	187,528	0.0	7.5	0	40	0	40
Local voters' associations	Bürger für Baabe (BfB)	648	187,528	0.0	7.5	0	40	0	40
Local voters' associations	Bündnis Ducherow	449	187,528	0.0	7.5	0	40	0	40
Local voters' associations	Wählergemeinschaft Upahl (WGU)	449	187,528	0.0	7.5	0	40	0	40
Local voters' associations	Kulturell – Interkulturell (K-I)	402	187,528	0.0	7.5	0	40	0	40
Sahra Wagenknecht Alliance (BSW)		153,219		6.1		30		29	
Alliance 90/The Greens (GRÜNE)		138,366		5.5		30		30	
Free Democratic Party (FDP)		70,944		2.8		15		15	
Free Voters (FW)		45,790		1.8		9		9	
Die PARTEI (PARTEI)		18,925		0.8		4		4	
Free Horizon	Freier Horizont - Aktionsbündnis für den Landkreis Mecklenburgische Seenplatte (Freier Horizont MSE)	7,540	16,338	0.3	0.7	2	3	2	3
Free Horizon	Freier Horizont - Aktionsbündnis für den Landkreis Ludwigslust-Parchim (Freier Horizont LUP)	4,238	16,338	0.2	0.7	1	3	1	3
Free Horizon	Freier Horizont - Bündnis für Rostock (Freier Horizont HRO)	1,911	16,338	0.1	0.7	0	3	0	3
Free Horizon	Freier Horizont - Energiewende mit Augenmaß (Freier Horizont LRO)	1,709	16,338	0.1	0.7	0	3	0	3
Free Horizon	Freier Horizont VG	940	16,338	0.0	0.7	0	3	0	3
The Homeland (HEIMAT)		11,577		0.5		2		2	
Human Environment Animal Protection Party (Tierschutzpartei)		10,409		0.4		2		2	
Die Unabhängigen		8,244		0.3		2		2	
Volt Germany (Volt)		6,502		0.3		1		1	
Grassroots Democratic Party of Germany (dieBasis)		6,094		0.2		1		1	
Bündnis Deutschland (BD)		5,472		0.2		1		1	
Pirate Party Germany (PIRATEN)		3,846		0.2		1		1	
Lobbyists for Children (LfK)		2,784		0.1		0		0	
Alliance C – Christians for Germany (Bündnis C)		1,417		0.1		0		0	
German Communist Party (DKP)		1,095		0.0		0		0	
Independents		32,572		1.3		3		3	
Total votes		2,547,563		100		520		519	
Valid ballots		2,501,377		1.8					
Invalid/blank ballots		46,186		98.2					
Turnout		867,871		64.2					

== Aftermath ==
The runoff election for the mayor of Wilhelmsburg on 23 June 2024 was won by Peter Volker Weimer, who ran for the Alternative for Germany (AfD), making him the first AfD mayor in all of Mecklenburg-Vorpommern.
