= Lübtheen =

Town in Mecklenburg-Vorpommern, Germany

- Town
- Lübtheen

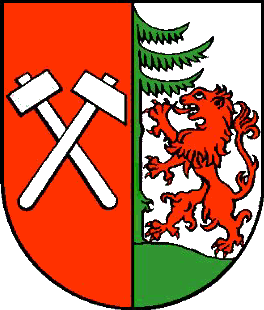
- Coat of arms

- Location of Lübtheen within Ludwigslust-Parchim district
- Interactive map of Lübtheen
- Location within Germany Location within Mecklenburg-Vorpommern
- Coordinates: 53°18′N 11°05′E
- Country: Germany
- State: Mecklenburg-Vorpommern
- District: Ludwigslust-Parchim
- Subdivisions: 18

Government
  - Mayor: Ute Lindenau (SPD)

Area
  - Total: 120.17 km^{2} (46.40 sq mi)
- Elevation: 15 m (49 ft)

Population (2025-12-31)
  - Total: 4,369
  - Density: 36.36/km^{2} (94.16/sq mi)
- Time zone: UTC+01:00 (CET)
  - Summer (DST): UTC+02:00 (CEST)
- Postal codes: 19249
- Dialling codes: 038855
- Vehicle registration: LWL
- Website: www.luebtheen.de

Lübtheen (German pronunciation: [lʏpˈteːn]) is a municipality in the Ludwigslust-Parchim district, in Mecklenburg-Western Pomerania, in northern Germany. It is situated 28 km (17 mi) west of Ludwigslust, and 37 km (23 mi) southwest of Schwerin. It is part of the Hamburg Metropolitan Region.

== History ==
During the final stages of World War II, on 12 March 1945, Probst Jesar (present district) was the site of a stopover during the German-organised march of Polish prisoners of war from the Oflag II-D camp to the Stalag X-B camp.

In Lübtheen the AfD district politician and Neonazi Philip Steinbeck beat and envious young people in 2025 and posted a video of it online. In Community House Lübtheen, he harassed two teenagers and forced them to lick a German flag. He was investigated for aggravated assault, coercion, and insult. The state AfD subsequently initiated party expulsion proceedings.

== Populated places ==
The city of Lübtheen (formerly an amt) consists of the following zones with their respective populated places:

- Lübtheen Borough
  - Jessenitz-Werk, Neu Lübtheen, Probst Jesar, Quassel, Trebs
- Garlitz Borough
  - Garlitz, Brömsenberg, Gudow, Langenheide
- Gößlow Borough
  - Gößlow, Bandekow, Lübbendorf, Neuenrode
- Jessenitz Borough
  - Jessenitz, Benz, Briest, Jessenitz-Siedlung, Lank, Volzrade

The former independent municipalities of Garlitz, Gößlow and Jessenitz were incorporated into the expanded city of Lübtheen on 13 June 2004.

== Notable people ==
- Friedrich Chrysander (1826–1901), music historian, critic and publisher
