= Wittenburg (Amt) =

- Amt
- Map of Ludwigslust-Parchim highlighting Wittenburg
- Interactive map of Wittenburg
- Location within Germany Location within Mecklenburg-Vorpommern
- Coordinates: 53°31′N 11°04′E
- Country: Germany
- State: Mecklenburg-Vorpommern
- District: Ludwigslust-Parchim
- Seat: Wittenburg
- Subdivisions: 2 municipalities

Area
  - Total: 184.81 km^{2} (71.36 sq mi)

Population (2025-12-31)
  - Total: 9,120
  - Density: 49.3/km^{2} (128/sq mi)
- Time zone: UTC+01:00 (CET)
  - Summer (DST): UTC+02:00 (CEST)
- Website: www.amt-wittenburg.de

Wittenburg is an Amt in the Ludwigslust-Parchim district, in Mecklenburg-Vorpommern, Germany. The seat of the Amt is in Wittenburg.

The Amt Wittenburg consists of the following municipalities:

1. Wittenburg
2. Wittendörp
