= Wittendörp =

- Municipality
- Location of Wittendörp within Ludwigslust-Parchim district
- Interactive map of Wittendörp
- Location within Germany Location within Mecklenburg-Vorpommern
- Coordinates: 53°32′N 11°04′E
- Country: Germany
- State: Mecklenburg-Vorpommern
- District: Ludwigslust-Parchim
- Municipal assoc.: Wittenburg
- Subdivisions: 14

Government
  - Mayor (2019–24): Kurt Bartels

Area
  - Total: 104.37 km^{2} (40.30 sq mi)
- Elevation: 34 m (112 ft)

Population (2025-12-31)
  - Total: 2,909
  - Density: 27.87/km^{2} (72.19/sq mi)
- Time zone: UTC+01:00 (CET)
  - Summer (DST): UTC+02:00 (CEST)
- Postal codes: 19243
- Dialling codes: 03869, 038852, 038853
- Vehicle registration: LUP, HGN, LBZ, LWL, PCH, STB
- Website: www.wittenburg.de

Wittendörp is a municipality in the administrative district of Ludwigslust-Parchim in Mecklenburg-Vorpommern, Germany. The municipality has a seat in the Amt of Wittenburg from where it is administered. The municipality is about 25 kilometres west of Schwerin in the north of the administrative district Ludwigslust-Parchim and borders on the administrative district of Nordwestmecklenburg in the north. The river Schilde flows through the municipality.

== Local areas ==
Boddin	Döbbersen	Dodow	Dreilützow	Drönnewitz
Harst	Karft	Luckwitz	Pogreß	Püttelkow
Raguth	Tessin	Waschow	Woez

== History ==
A battle took place in the area of Waschow on 25 May 1200 between Adolf III of Schauenburg and Holstein and Prince Nikolaus I of Mecklenburg. They fought over the city of Ratzeburg. The battle ended with the victory of the Mecklenburg prince, Nikolaus I, who secured the estates of Schönberg, Gadebusch, Wittenburg and Boizenburg, but was fatally injured.
