= Körchow =

- Ortsteil of Wittenburg
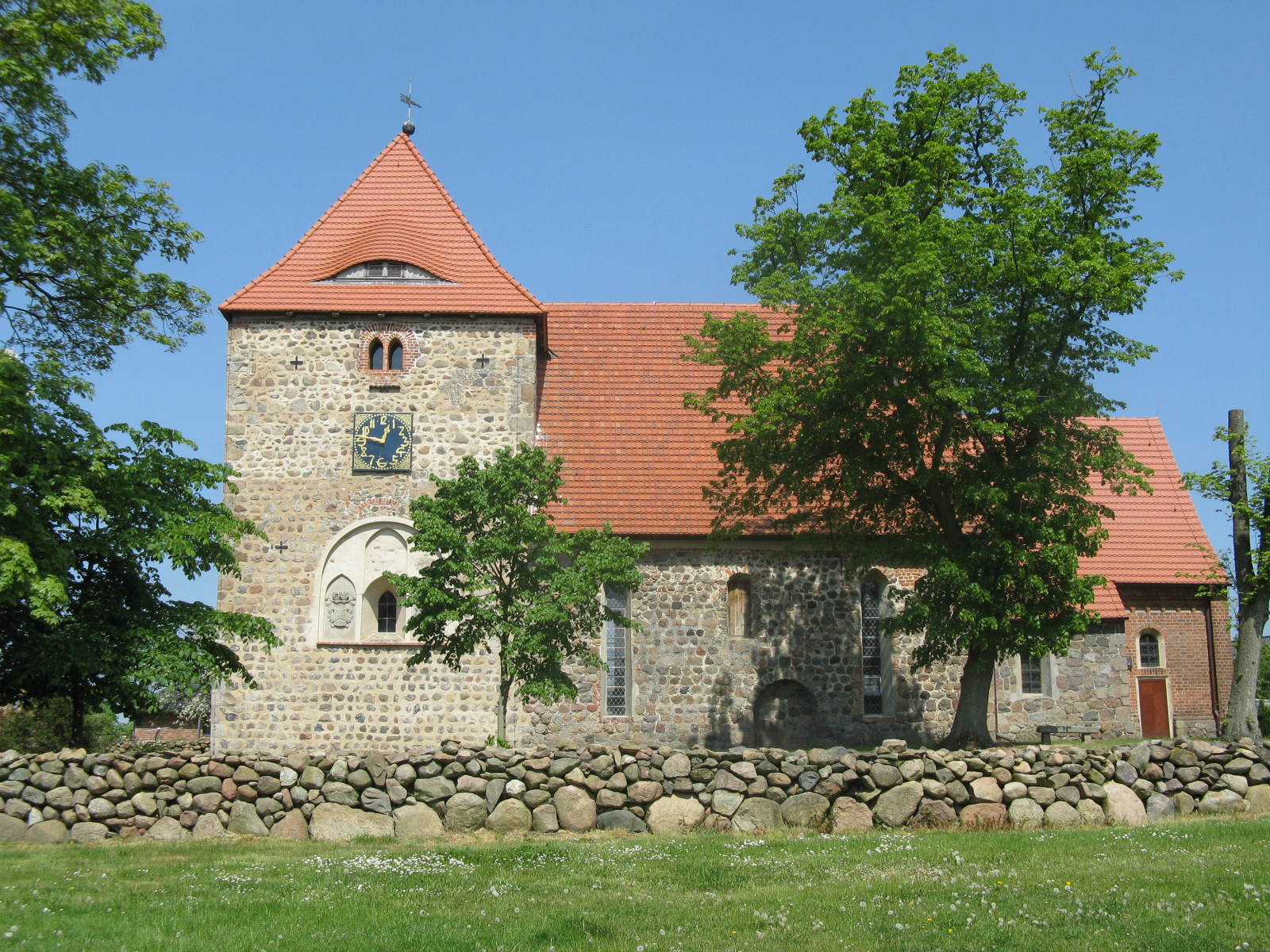
- A church in Körchow

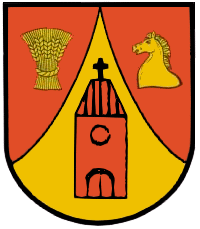
- Coat of arms
- Interactive map of Körchow
- Location within Germany Location within Mecklenburg-Vorpommern
- Coordinates: 53°27′N 11°4′E
- Country: Germany
- State: Mecklenburg-Vorpommern
- District: Ludwigslust-Parchim
- Town: Wittenburg

Area
  - Total: 26.00 km^{2} (10.04 sq mi)
- Elevation: 64 m (210 ft)

Population (2012-12-31)
  - Total: 773
  - Density: 29.7/km^{2} (77.0/sq mi)
- Time zone: UTC+01:00 (CET)
  - Summer (DST): UTC+02:00 (CEST)
- Postal codes: 19243
- Dialling codes: 038848, 038852
- Vehicle registration: LWL
- Website: www.amt-wittenburg.de

Körchow is a village and a former municipality in the Ludwigslust-Parchim district, in Mecklenburg-Vorpommern, Germany. Since 25 May 2014, it is part of the town Wittenburg.
