= Content writing services =

Providing content for websites

Content writing services (also known as online content writing services and content marketing services) is a category of work that first surfaced in the early 1990s, due to an exponential rise in online activities. Content writing services are firms, companies or group of writers that provide services such as blog writing for websites, web content writing, marketing material content, white papers, research articles, proof reading services, infographic content, social media content, press releases, product descriptions, copywriting services, proofreading and editing and many more.

Content writing services generally charge a fixed per word rate which is popularly known as PPW (pay per word or price per word). However, many content writing firms also have pricing plans that offer fixed amount of content against subscription plans.

== History ==
Adoption of the World Wide Web spread across the globe during the early 1990s. With it came the ability for businesses to represent themselves through a website, enabling visitors to obtain relevant information and engage with their favorite brands. Later came search engines like Yahoo, Google, and Bing. Their goal was to categorize information found on the internet and present it to those who were searching for it. This information, known as web content, became intrinsic to the modern Web in years to come.

== See also ==
- Copywriting
- Web content development
- Blogging
- Website content writer
