= Lehsen =

- Ortsteil of Wittenburg
- Interactive map of Lehsen
- Location within Germany Location within Mecklenburg-Vorpommern
- Coordinates: 53°28′N 11°01′E
- Country: Germany
- State: Mecklenburg-Vorpommern
- District: Ludwigslust-Parchim
- Town: Wittenburg

Area
  - Total: 7.75 km^{2} (2.99 sq mi)
- Elevation: 42 m (138 ft)

Population (2012-12-31)
  - Total: 353
  - Density: 45.5/km^{2} (118/sq mi)
- Time zone: UTC+01:00 (CET)
  - Summer (DST): UTC+02:00 (CEST)
- Postal codes: 19243
- Dialling codes: 038852
- Vehicle registration: LWL
- Website: www.wittenburg.de

Lehsen is a village and a former municipality in the Ludwigslust-Parchim district, in Mecklenburg-Vorpommern, Germany. Since 25 May 2014, it is part of the town Wittenburg.
