= Website content writer =

Person providing content for websites

A Website content writer or web content writer is a person who specializes in providing content for websites. Every website has a specific target audience and requires the most relevant content to attract business. Content should contain keywords (specific business-related terms, which internet users might use in order to search for services or products) aimed towards improving a website's SEO. A website content writer who also has knowledge of the SEO process is referred to as an SEO Content Writer.

Most story pieces are centered on marketing products or services, though this is not always the case. Some websites are informational only and do not sell a product or service. These websites are often news sites or blogs. Informational sites educate the reader with complex information that is easy to understand and retain.

== Functions ==
There is a growing demand for skilled web content writing on the Internet. Quality content often translates into higher revenues for online businesses.

Website owners and managers depend on content writers to perform several major tasks:

1. Understand the business concept and develop audience-centric content that aligns with the brand's messaging and objectives.
2. Check for keywords or generate a keyword, and research limitations for the keywords.
3. Create or copy edit to inform the reader, and to promote or sell the company, product, or service described on the website.
4. Produce content to entice and engage visitors so they continue browsing the current website. The longer a visitor stays on a particular site, the greater the likelihood they will eventually become clients or customers.
5. Produce content that is smart in its use of keywords, or is focused on search engine optimization (SEO). This means the text must contain relevant keywords and phrases that are most likely to be entered by users in web searches associated with the actual site for better search engine indexing and ranking.
6. Create content that allows the site visitors to get the information they want quickly and efficiently. Efficient and focused web content gives readers access to information in a user-friendly manner.
7. Create unique, useful, and compelling content on a topic primarily for the readers and not merely for the search engines.

Website content writing aims for relevance and search-ability. Relevance means that the website text should be useful and beneficial to readers. Search-ability indicates the usage of keywords to help search engines direct users to websites that meet their search criteria.

There are various ways through which websites come up with article writing, and one of them is outsourcing content writing. However, it is riskier than other options, as not all writers can write content specific to the web.

Content can be written for various purposes in various forms. The most popular forms of content writing are:

- Blogging
- Writing white papers
- e-books
- Newsletters
- Promotional mails (content for email marketing purpose)
- Social media management and promotion
- Brochures
- Flyers
- or any other offline or online marketing purposes

The content in website differs based on the product or service it is used for.

== Online writers vs. print writers ==
Writing online is different from composing and constructing content for printed materials. Web users often tend to scan text rather than reading it closely, skipping what they perceive to be unnecessary information and search for what they regard as most relevant. It is estimated that seventy-nine percent of users scan web content. It is also reported that it takes twenty-five percent more time to scan content online compared to print content. Web content writers must have the skills to insert paragraphs and headlines containing keywords for search engine optimization, as well as to make sure their composition is clear, to reach their target market. They need to be skilled writers and good at engaging an audience as well as understanding the needs of web users.

== Content writing providers ==
Website content writing is frequently outsourced to external providers, such as individual web copywriters or for larger or more complex projects, a specialized digital marketing agency. It shall be said that most of the content writers also spend time learning about digital marketing with more focus on Search Engine Optimization, Pay Per Click, Social Media Optimization etc. so that they can develop right content which can help clients with marketing business easily.

Digital marketing agencies combine copy-writing services with a range of editorial and associated services, that may include brand positioning, message consulting, social media, SEO consulting, developmental and copy editing, proofreading, fact checking, layout, content syndication, and design.

Outsourcing allows businesses to focus on core competencies and to benefit from the specialized knowledge of professional copywriters and editors.

== See also ==
- Copywriting
- Web content development
- Blogging
- Content writing services
- Artificial Intelligence in Content Creation
