= Wittenburg =

Town in Mecklenburg-Vorpommern, Germany

- Town
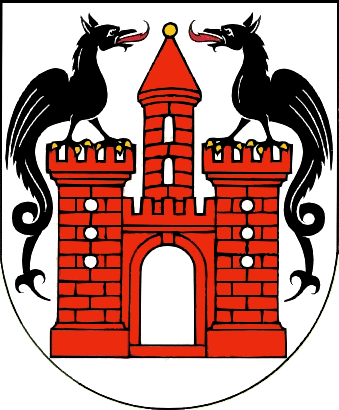
- Coat of arms

- Location of Wittenburg within Ludwigslust-Parchim district
- Interactive map of Wittenburg
- Location within Germany Location within Mecklenburg-Vorpommern
- Coordinates: 53°30′N 11°04′E
- Country: Germany
- State: Mecklenburg-Vorpommern
- District: Ludwigslust-Parchim
- Municipal assoc.: Wittenburg
- Founded: 1230

Government
  - Mayor (2020–27): Christian Greger (CDU)

Area
  - Total: 80.08 km^{2} (30.92 sq mi)
- Elevation: 40 m (130 ft)

Population (2025-12-31)
  - Total: 6,211
  - Density: 77.56/km^{2} (200.9/sq mi)
- Time zone: UTC+01:00 (CET)
  - Summer (DST): UTC+02:00 (CEST)
- Postal codes: 19243
- Dialling codes: 038852
- Vehicle registration: LWL, LUP
- Website: www.wittenburg.de

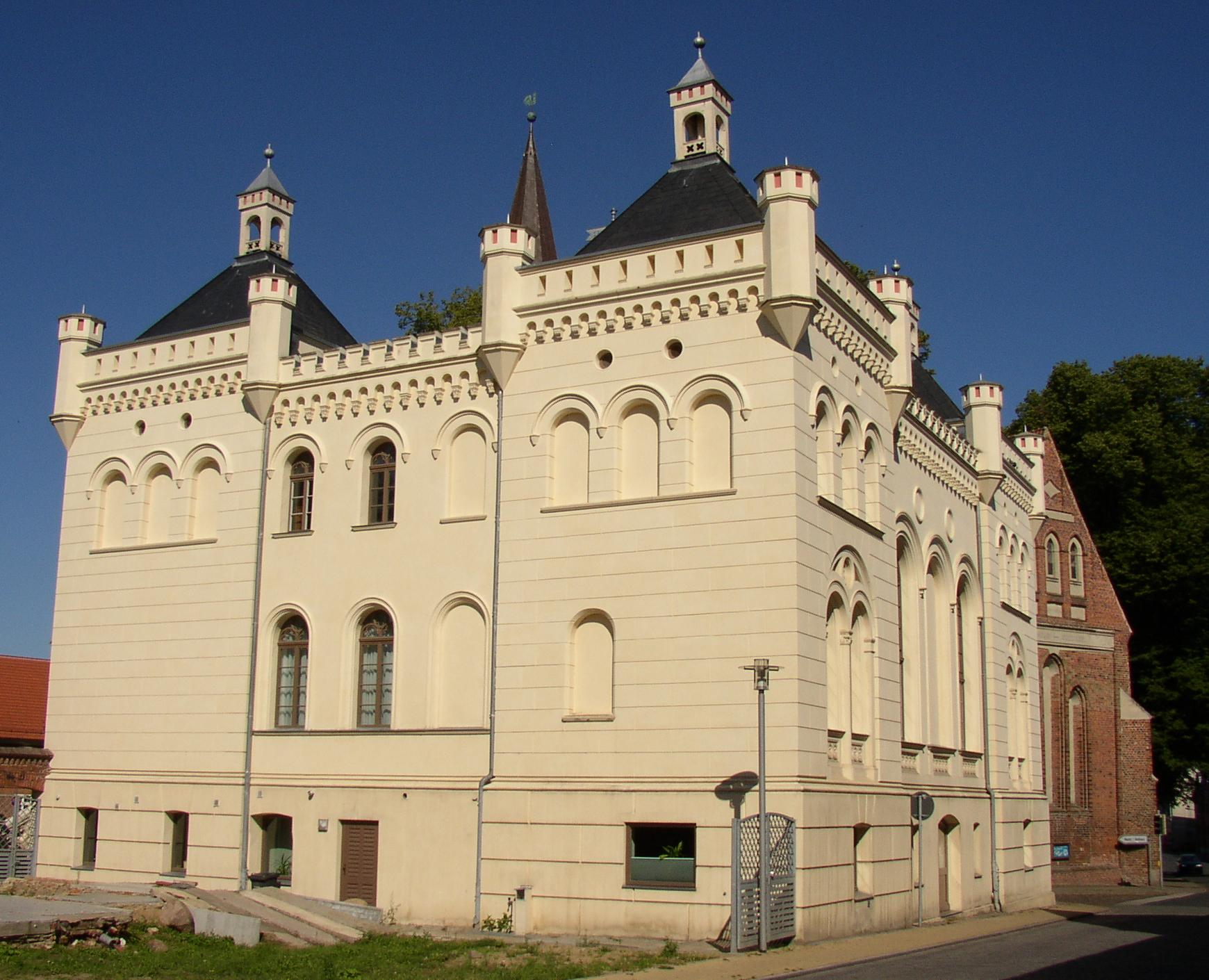
Town hall of Wittenburg

Wittenburg (German: [ˈvɪtn̩ˌbʊʁk]) is a town in the district Ludwigslust-Parchim in Mecklenburg-Vorpommern, Germany.

Wittenburg has been the seat of the Amt of Wittenburg since January 2004. It is in the west of Mecklenburg-Vorpommern and lies on the little river Motel.

The settlements of Helm, Klein Wolde, Wölzow, Lehsen, Körchow and Ziggelmark are part of Wittenburg.

At the beginning of the 12th century, Wittenburg belonged to the territory of the Polaben Obotrites. Wittenburg was first mentioned in 1154 and gained town privileges in 1230.

== Number of inhabitants ==
Year	Inhabitants
1496	500-600
1644	100 (Thirty Years' War)
1857	3.100
1920	3.359
1989	6.000
2000	5.161
2006	4.924
2015	6.385

== Notable people ==
- Harald Ringstorff (born 1939), politician (SPD)

== Gallery ==
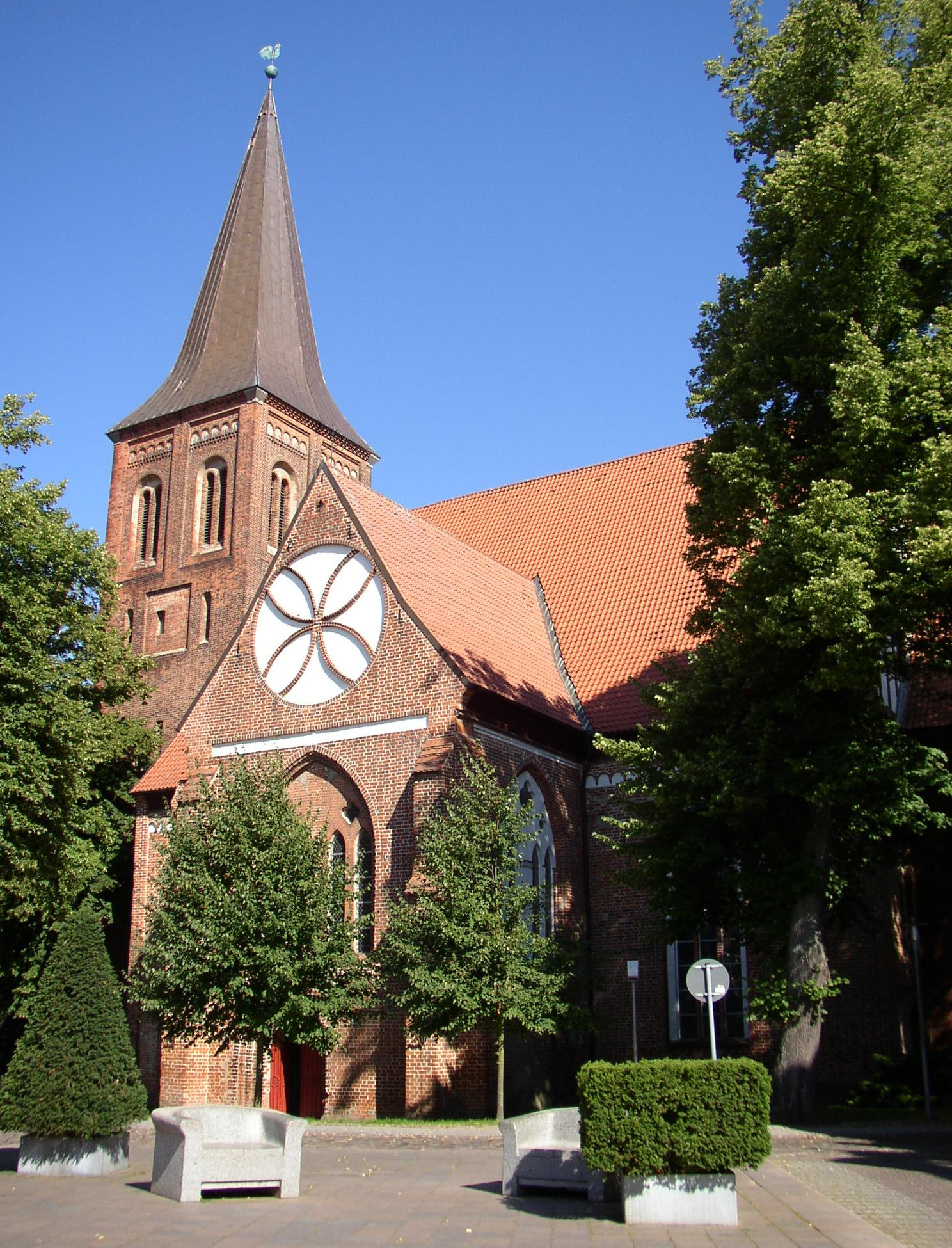
St. Bartholomew's church

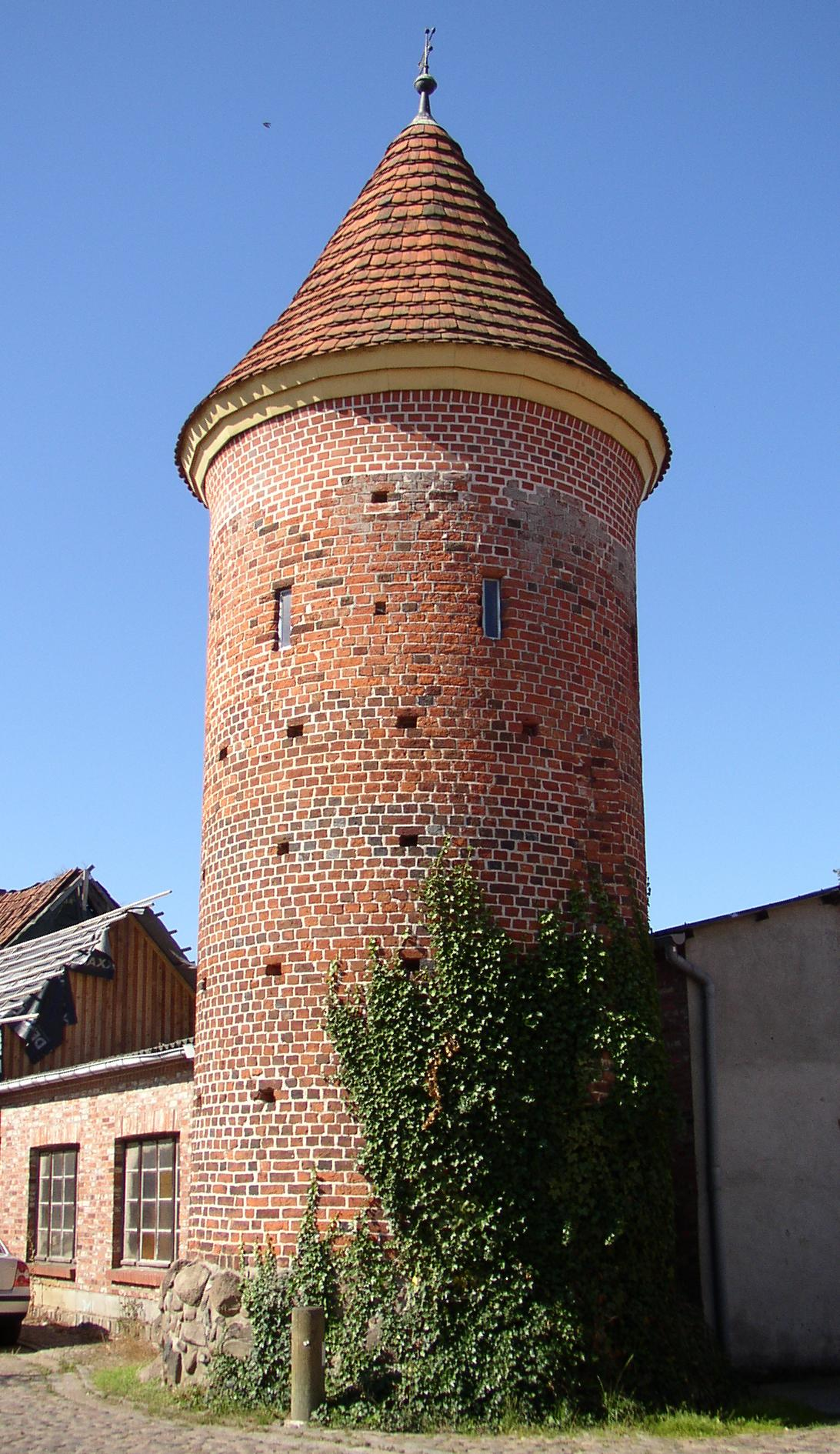
Tower of town wall

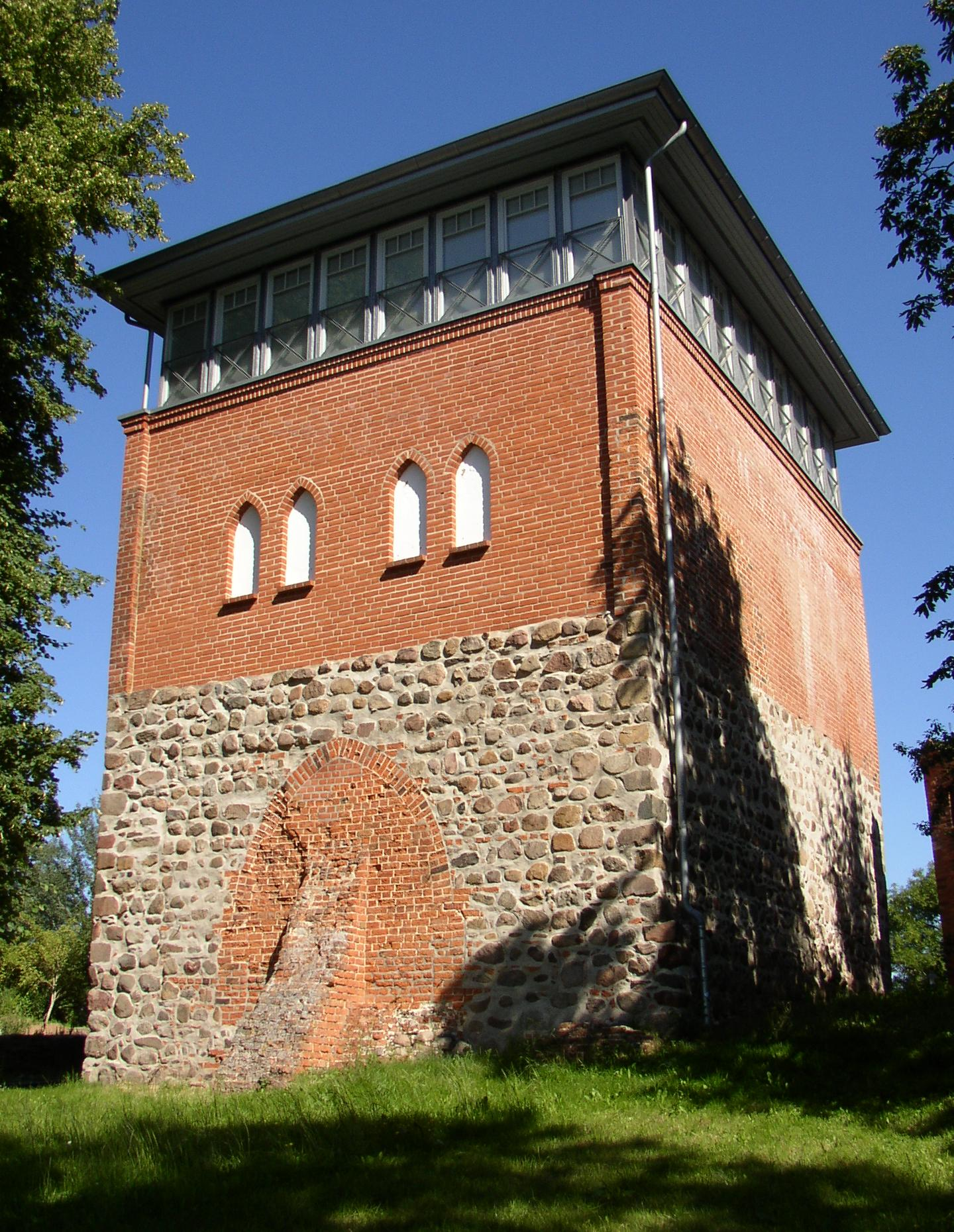
„Amtsbergturm“

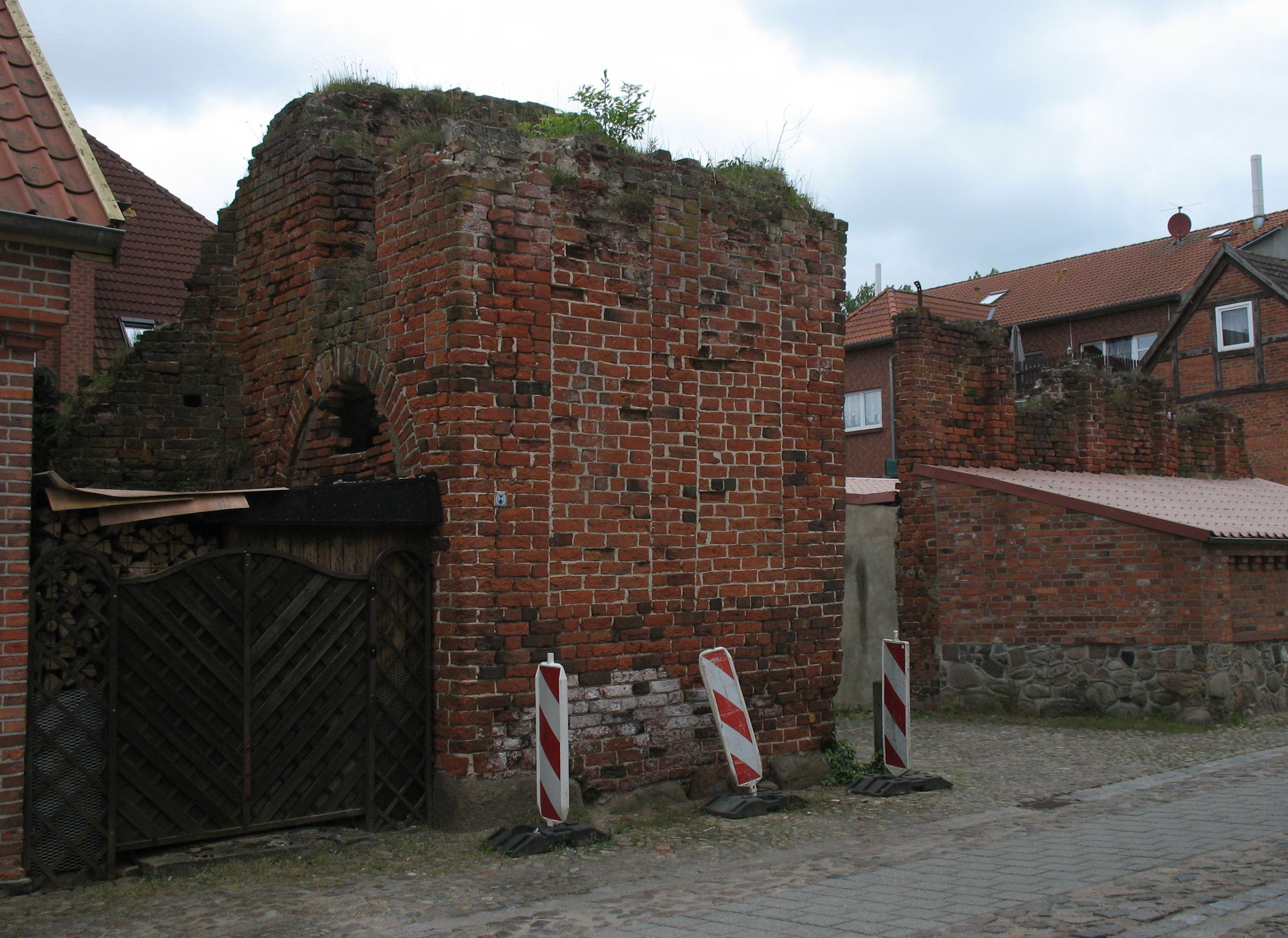
Town wall

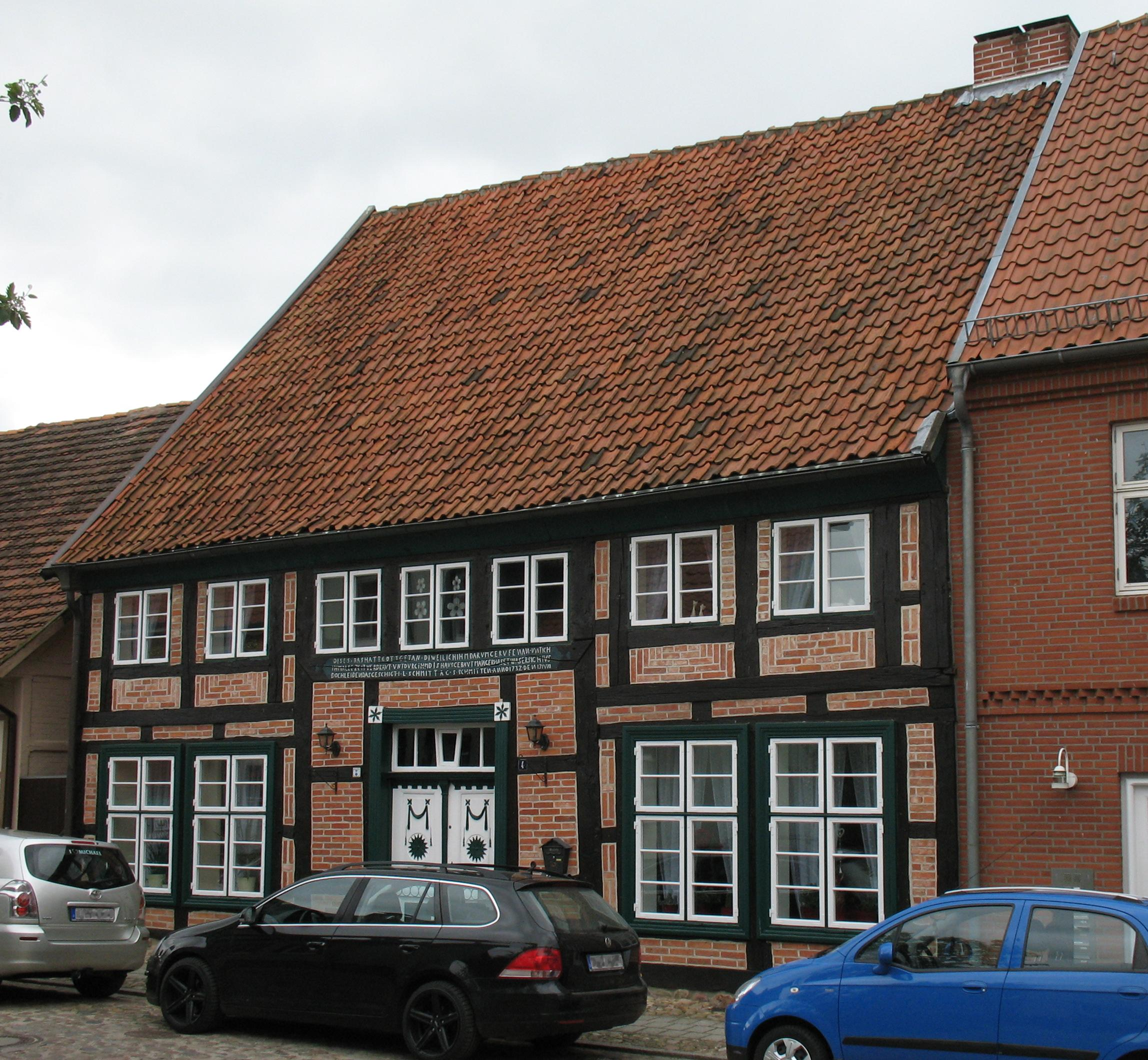
Timber framing

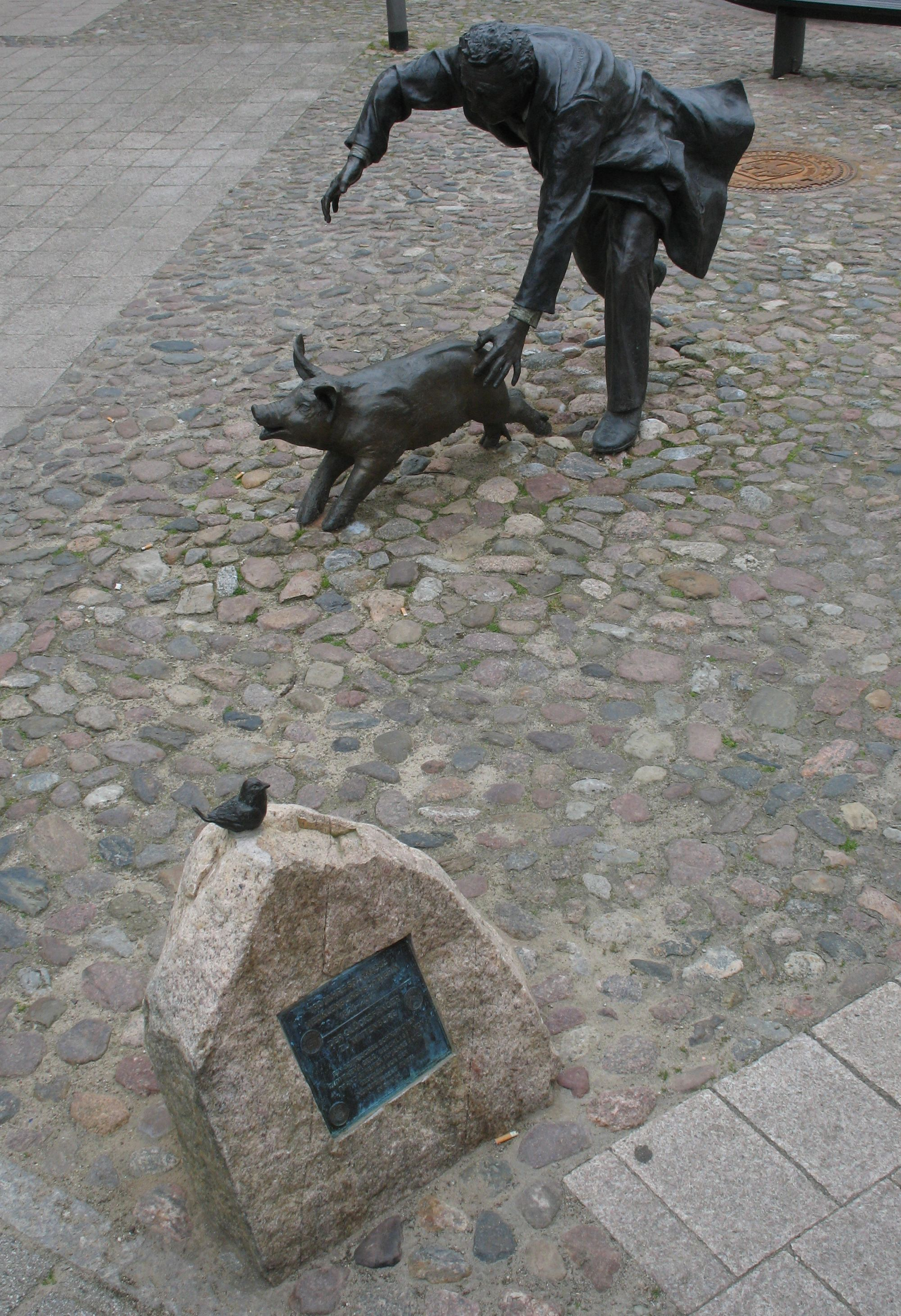
Sculpture on market square

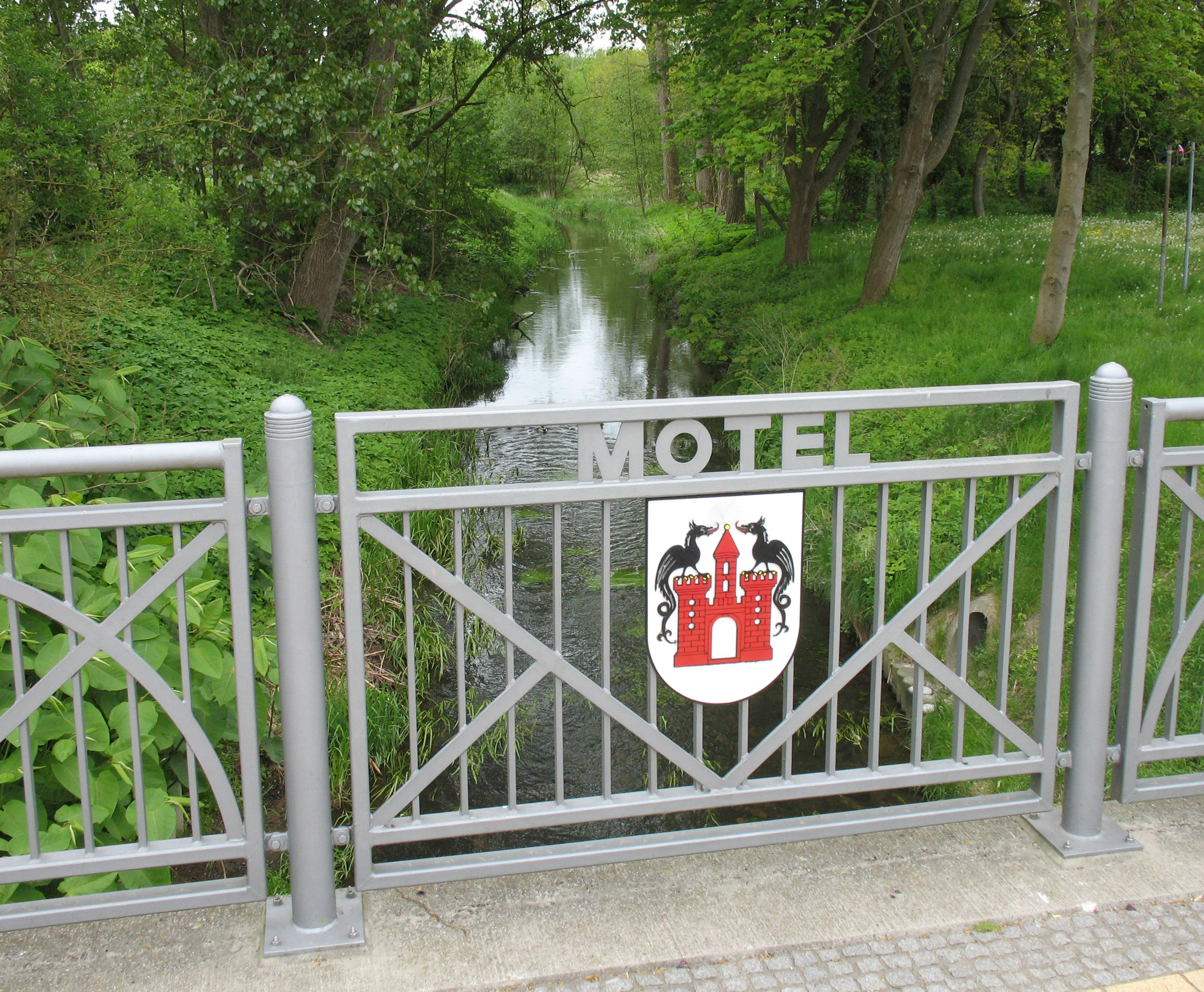
River Motel
