= Blankenberg (Meckl) station =

Railway station in Germany

Blankenberg (Meckl)
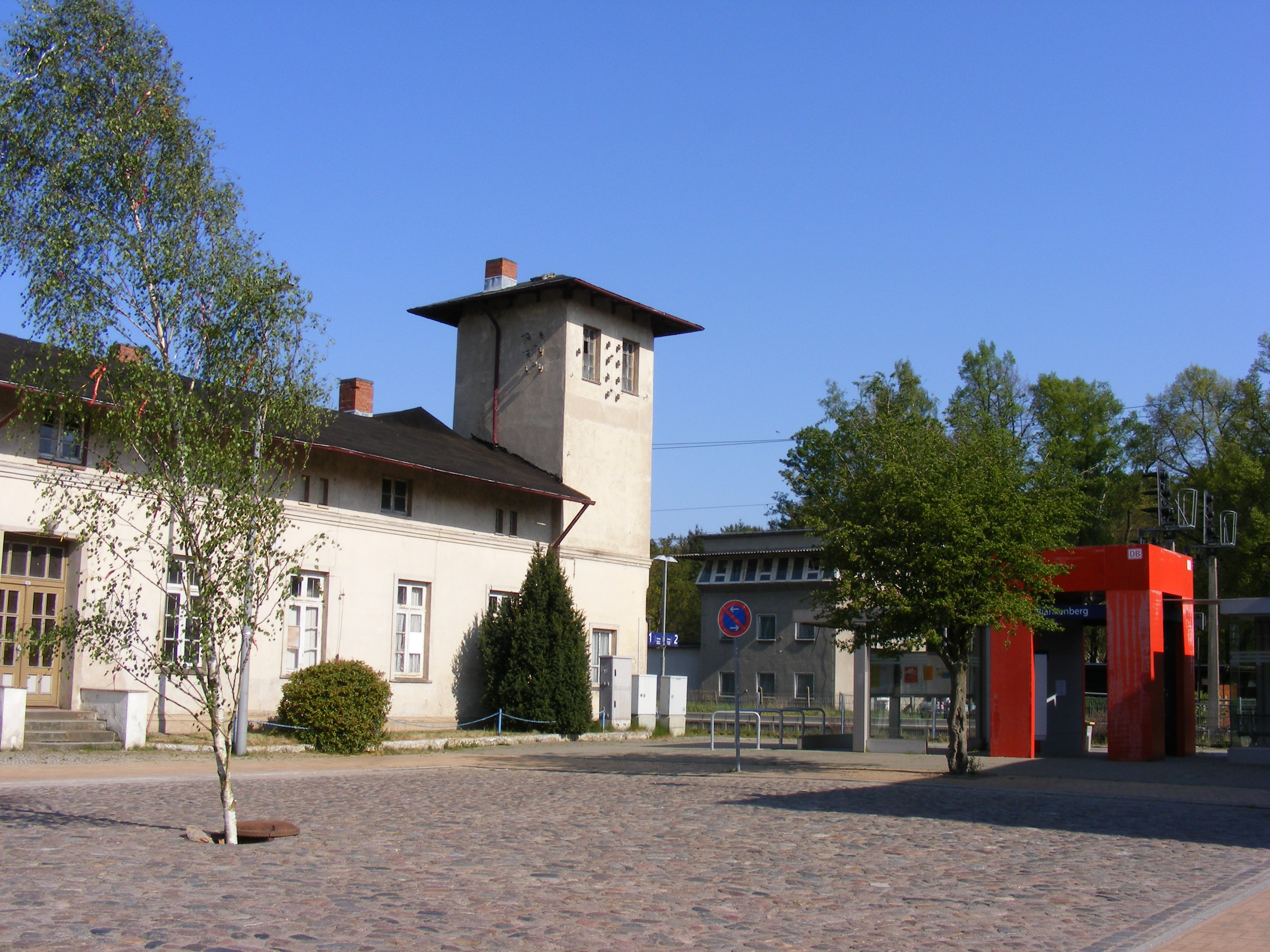
- Station building on the Bad Kleinen–Rostock line with signalbox

General information
- Location: Bahnhofsplatz 5, Blankenberg, Mecklenburg-Vorpommern; Germany
- Coordinates: 53°46′19″N 11°42′53″E
- Lines: Bad Kleinen–Rostock (KBS 100); Wismar-Karow (no passenger services anymore)
- Platforms: 4

Construction
- Accessible: Yes
- Architectural style: Neo-classical

Other information
- Station code: 683
- DS100 code: WBL
- IBNR: 8010051
- Category: 6
- Website: www.bahnhof.de

History
- Opened: 13 May 1850; 176 years ago
- Electrified: 12 April 1986; 40 years ago

Services
Preceding station	DB Regio Nordost	Following station
Ventschow towards Hamburg Hbf	RE 1	Bützow towards Rostock Hbf
Ventschow towards Bützow	RE 4	Bützow towards Szczecin Główny or Ueckermünde Stadthafen
Bad Kleinen towards Ludwigslust	RB 28	Bützow towards Rostock Hbf
Location
- Location within Mecklenburg-Vorpommern Location within Germany Location within Europe

Blankenberg (Meckl) station is a railway junction in the German state of Mecklenburg-Vorpommern. The station was opened on 13 May 1850 and is one of the oldest railway stations in this state. It is at the intersection of the Bad Kleinen–Rostock and the Wismar–Karow railways. Regular passenger services run only on the former route. Most of the Wismar–Karow railway is closed, but between Blankenberg, Sternberg and Dabel there are occasional freight trains.

== Location ==
The station is located in the northwest of the district of Ludwigslust-Parchim in the town of Blankenberg, which belongs to the amt (sub-district) of Sternberger Seenlandschaft. The nearest towns are Warin, four kilometres north, and Brüel, about four km south of Blankenberg. The Bad Kleinen–Rostock railway, which runs in an approximately west–east direction, and the mostly closed Wismar–Karow branch line, which runs in the northwest–southeast direction, cross in Blankenberg.

== History ==
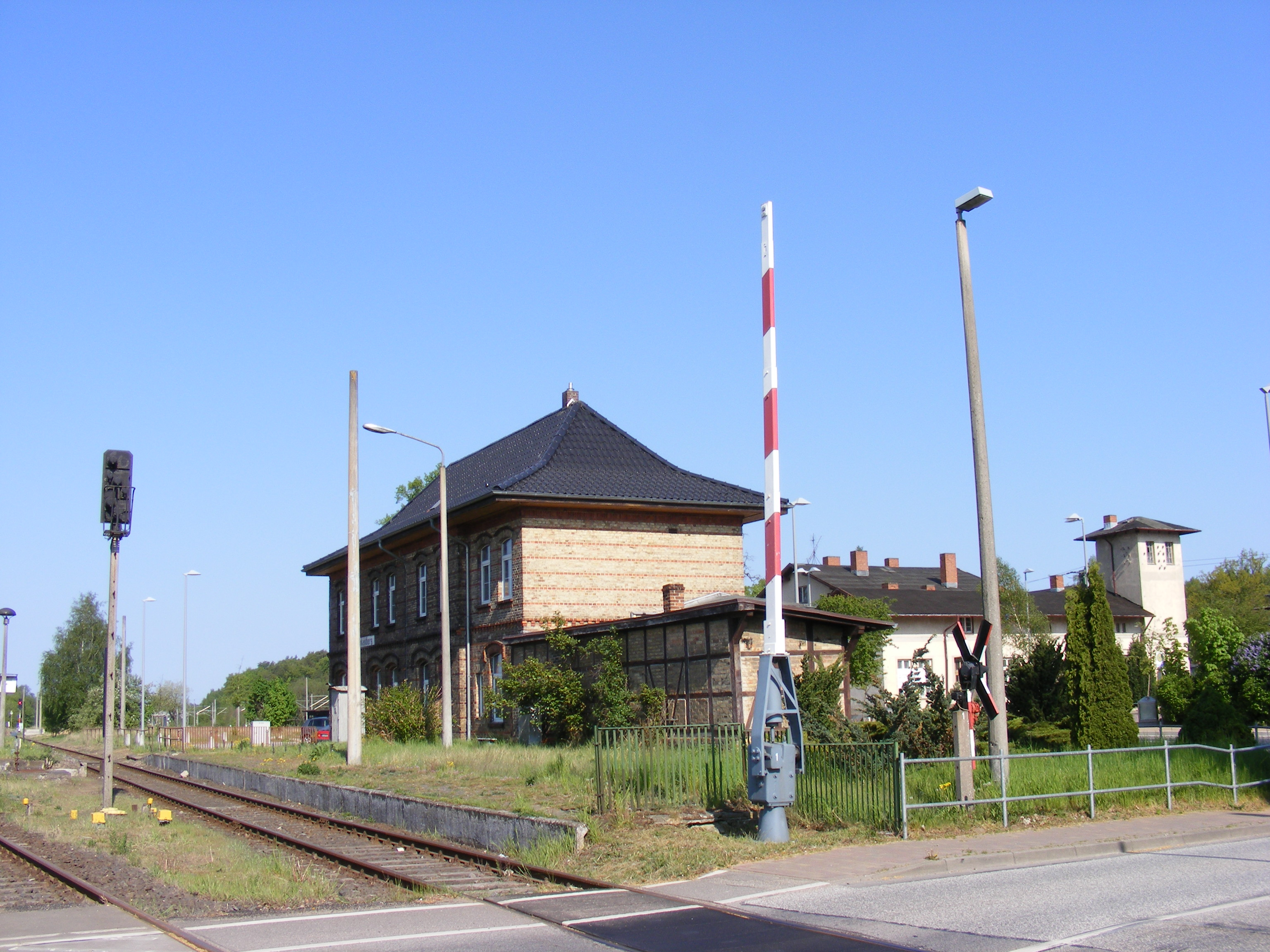
Tracks of the Wismar-Karow railway with catenary post in front of the building and the Bad Kleinen–Rostock line (background)

After the first railway in the Grand Duchy of Mecklenburg-Schwerin, the Berlin–Hamburg line, was opened in 1846, the Grand Duchy began planning to build its own railway network. The connection from Hagenow to Schwerin was opened in 1847, which was extended to Wismar a year later. A line was built from Kleinen (later Bad Kleinen) to Rostock in 1850 with a branch from Bützow to Güstrow. When choosing the route different options were tested. The shortest route from Schwerin via Sternberg to Bützow would have had to cross Lake Schwerin (Schweriner See) on an embankment near the Paulsdamm (a road embankment completed in 1842). Another option, with a route via the town of Brüel, failed due to the opposition of the local council. So the railway was built through the small village of Blankenberg between the two towns of Brüel and Warin. Besides Schwaan and Bützow, Blankenberg was one of only three stations that were opened with the line. Two pairs of trains ran daily between Rostock, Blankenberg and Kleinen at the beginning of operations.

The Wismar–Karower railway, which crossed the main line at Blankenberg station, was opened on 14 November 1887. It had its own railway station, which at times was designated as Blankenberg Ost (east). Blankenberg thus became a small railway junction. Above all, the station served to transfer traffic towards Sternberg, Brüel, Warin and Neukloster. In 1939, for example, seven to eight pairs of trains ran on the branch line, which usually provided connections between passenger trains on the branch line and express trains on the main line.

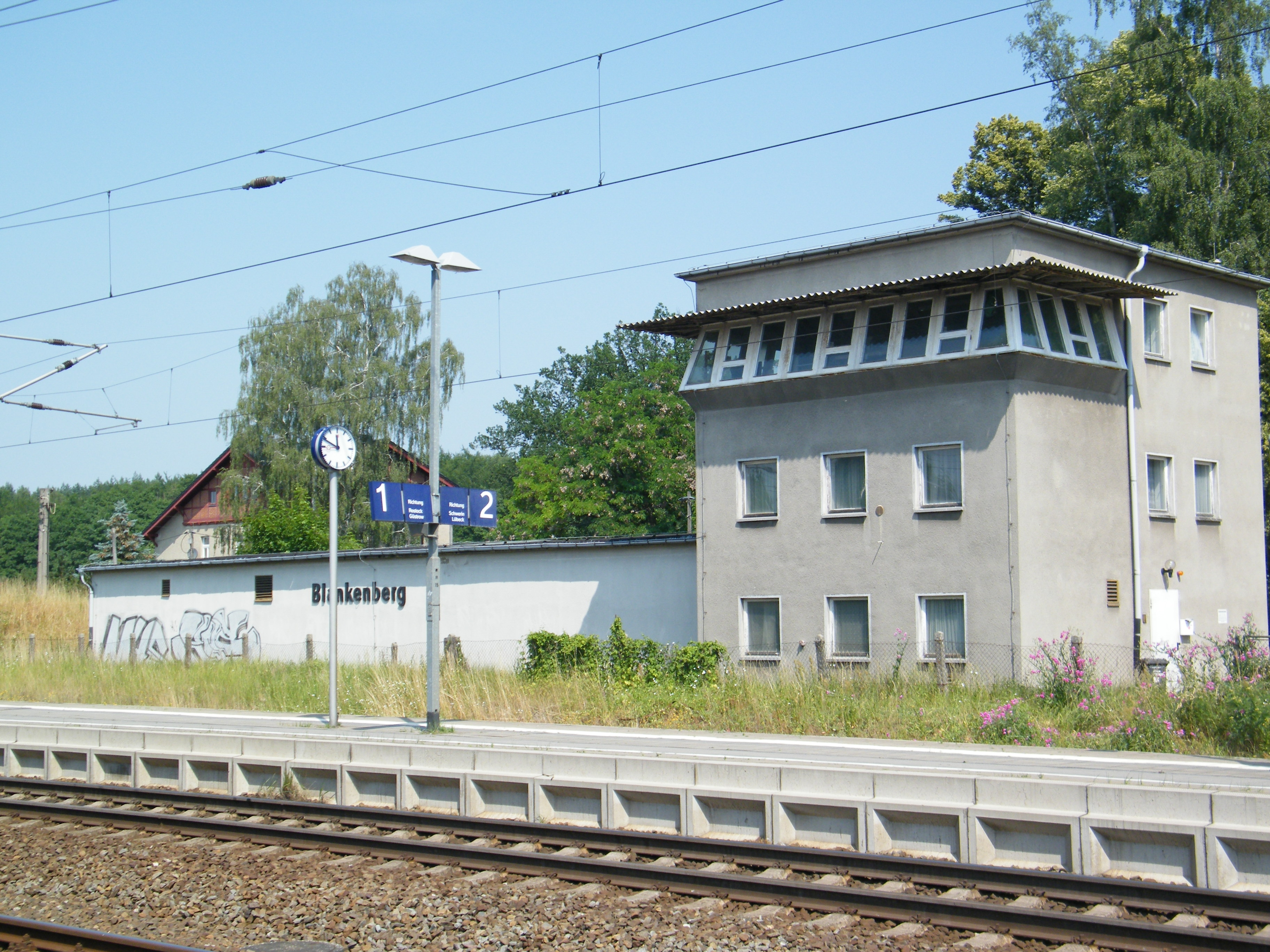
Platform and signalbox

Some express trains (Durchgangszug) stopped at Blankenberg in the 1970s and 1980s. In 1977, a new signalbox was built at the station, replacing several old signalboxes. Since 1986, the main railway line has been electrified and the part of the station used by the branch line was also provided with catenary. The transfer tracks from the Wismar–Karow railway to the line to Bad Kleinen was also renewed in the 1980s.

After German reunification, traffic flows changed again. Long-distance traffic ended in the 1990s, but integrated regular-interval regional services were established. In 1998, passenger services on the Wismar–Karow line were abandoned. The section from Blankenberg to Hornstorf connecting to Wismar was closed on 23 September 1999. After 2000, most sidings were dismantled and only one track connection between the two lines is left. The catenary in the branch line section of the station was removed.

In passenger transport, only the main line is served. The following two services serve Blankenberg, both operating every two hours:

Line	Route	Frequency
RE 1	Rostock – Bützow – Blankenberg – Bad Kleinen — Schwerin – Hamburg Hbf	2 h
RE 4	Lübeck – Bad Kleinen – Blankenberg – Bützow – Güstrow – Neubrandenburg – Pasewalk – Szczecin	2 h
RB 28	Ludwigslust – Schwerin – Bad Kleinen – Blankenberg – Bützow – Rostock	Some trains

Intercity trains do stop at the station. There are no passenger services on the Wismar–Karow railway, instead buses run towards Brüel, Sternberg and Warin. Freight traffic for the biodiesel company ecoMotion has run to Sternberg and Dabel since 2002. Prignitzer Eisenbahn owns the track and manages the infrastructure. Eisenbahngesellschaft Potsdam operates freight services on the line.

== Infrastructure ==
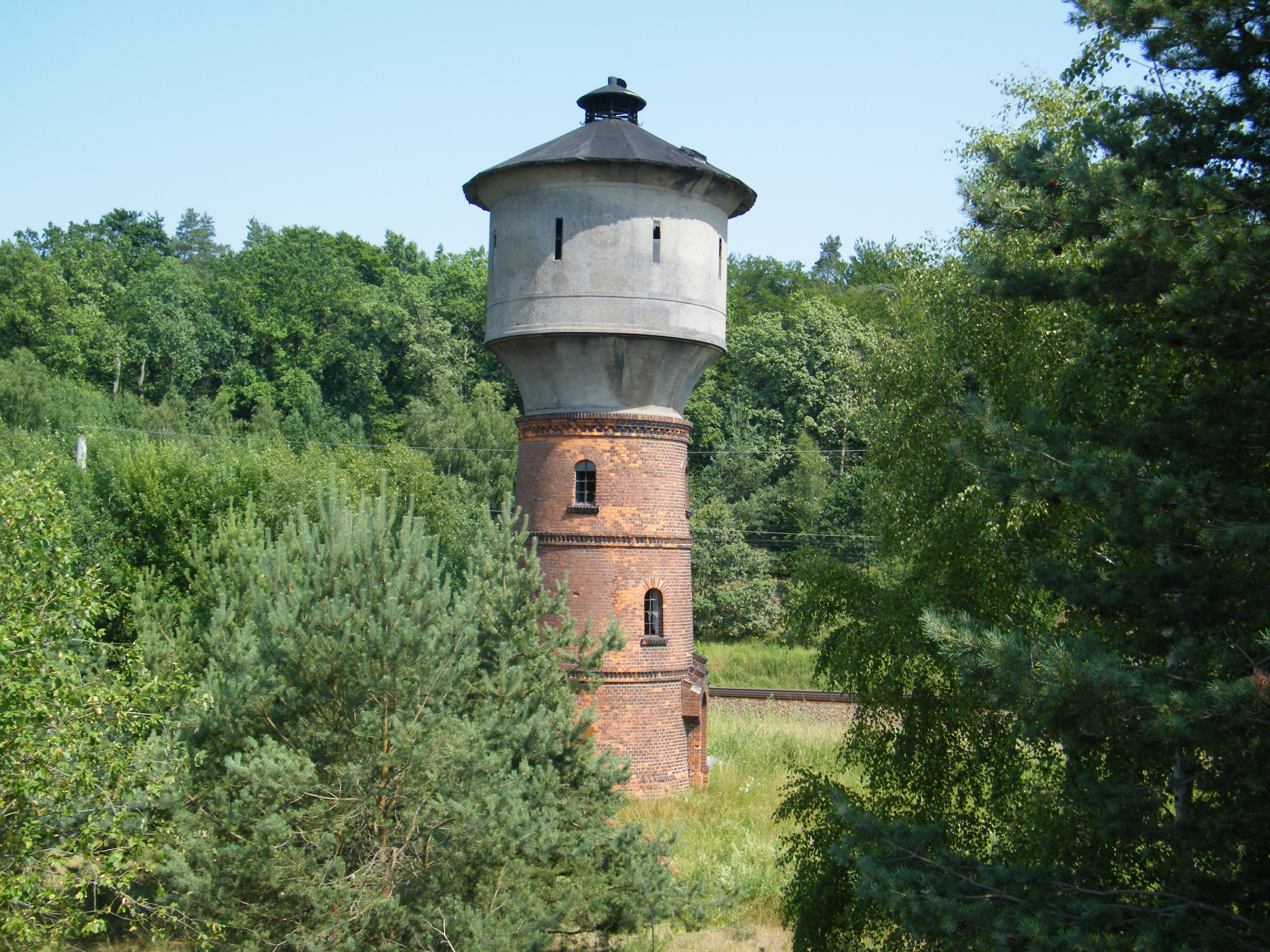
A listed former water tower in the west of the station facilities

The station consists of two separate parts. In the north are the facilities of the Bad Kleinen–Rostock railway and in the south are the facilities of the Wismar–Karow branch line. Located between two parts of the station is the station forecourt (Bahnhofsplatz). To the east national highway federal highway 192 crosses the tracks over a level crossing. Both lines also each have their own entrance building. West of the station forecourt are today largely abandoned facilities for freight. In this area there is a crossover between the two lines and a water tower. Further to the west, the disused section of the Wismar–Karow railway crosses on an overpass over the line to Bad Kleinen.

The neo-classical entrance building dates from time of the opening of the station. Its eastern side is a single-storey building with a small tower and the western side is two storeys; each side also has an attic. The precincts of the station forecourt with the post office building on the east side were built at the same time. The two-storey entrance building of the Wismar–Karow line served later as a residential building. East of the station forecourt there were originally a locomotive shed build with timber trusses and a water supply point with a water tower and a signal tower.

An island platform is available for passengers on the main line. The platform next to the station building and island platform of the Wismar-Karower railway is no longer used. A signal box was opened in 1977 north of the tracks of the main line.

Both entrance buildings, the water tower and some railway workers houses north of the Bad Kleinen–Rostock line are listed on the heritage list of the district of Ludwigslust-Parchim. However, both station buildings are empty and not in use. The old post office building in the station forecourt was partially demolished in 2009.
