= Ventschow =

- Municipality
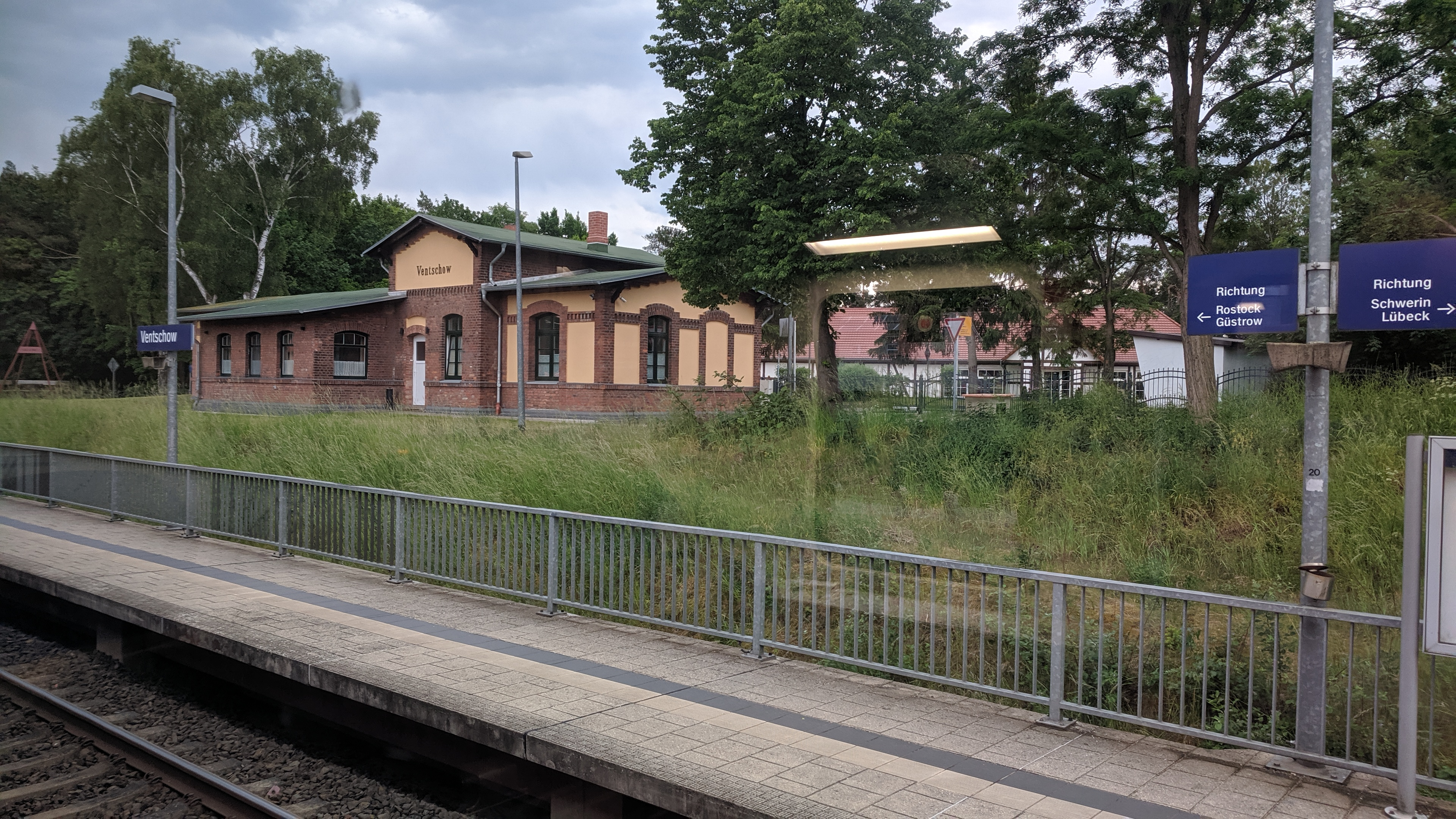
- Ventschow station

- Location of Ventschow within Nordwestmecklenburg district
- Interactive map of Ventschow
- Location within Germany Location within Mecklenburg-Vorpommern
- Coordinates: 53°46′N 11°34′E
- Country: Germany
- State: Mecklenburg-Vorpommern
- District: Nordwestmecklenburg
- Municipal assoc.: Dorf Mecklenburg-Bad Kleinen

Government
  - Mayor: Dieter Voß

Area
  - Total: 13.63 km^{2} (5.26 sq mi)
- Elevation: 38 m (125 ft)

Population (2025-12-31)
  - Total: 736
  - Density: 54.0/km^{2} (140/sq mi)
- Time zone: UTC+01:00 (CET)
  - Summer (DST): UTC+02:00 (CEST)
- Postal codes: 19417
- Dialling codes: 038484
- Vehicle registration: NWM
- Website: www.amt-dorf-mecklenburg.de

Ventschow (German pronunciation: [ˈfɛntʃoː]) is a municipality in the Nordwestmecklenburg district, in Mecklenburg-Vorpommern, Germany.

== Geography ==
The municipality belongs to the extreme northwest of the Mecklenburg Lake Plateau. The village, surrounded by numerous small lakes, is about 16 kilometres from the Hanseatic city of Wismar and three kilometres from the northern tip of Lake Schwerin.

The district Kleekamp belongs to Ventschow. The former districts of Dämelow and Neuhof were separated from the municipality of Ventschow on 1 June 1992 and incorporated into Bibow.

== History ==
On 1 July 1950, the previously independent municipality of Kleekamp was incorporated.

== Transport accessibility ==
Ventschow has good connecting roads to Wismar, Warin and Brüel and to the B 106 via Bad Kleinen. Ventschow railway station is located on the Bad Kleinen–Rostock railway line. The A 14 (Schwerin - Wismar) runs through the eastern part of the municipal territory.
