= Neukloster =

Town in Mecklenburg-Vorpommern, Germany

- Town
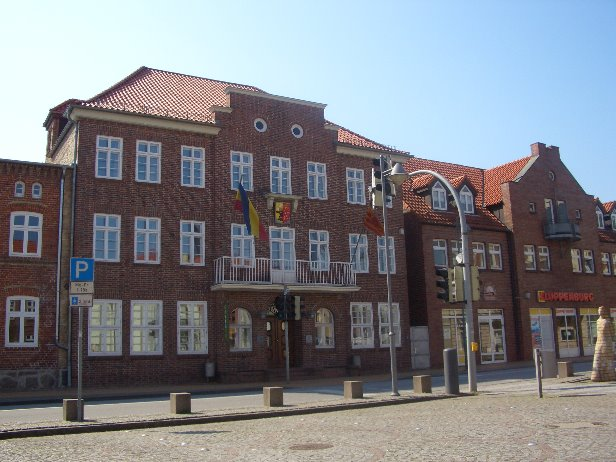
- Town hall

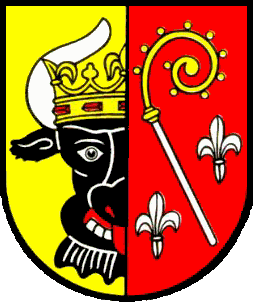
- Coat of arms

- Location of Neukloster within Nordwestmecklenburg district
- Interactive map of Neukloster
- Location within Germany Location within Mecklenburg-Vorpommern
- Coordinates: 53°52′N 11°41′E
- Country: Germany
- State: Mecklenburg-Vorpommern
- District: Nordwestmecklenburg
- Municipal assoc.: Neukloster-Warin

Government
  - Mayor: Frank Meier

Area
  - Total: 27.51 km^{2} (10.62 sq mi)
- Elevation: 30 m (98 ft)

Population (2025-12-31)
  - Total: 3,968
  - Density: 144.2/km^{2} (373.6/sq mi)
- Time zone: UTC+01:00 (CET)
  - Summer (DST): UTC+02:00 (CEST)
- Postal codes: 23992
- Dialling codes: 038422
- Vehicle registration: NWM
- Website: www.neukloster.de

Neukloster (German pronunciation: [nɔʏˈkloːstɐ]) is a town in the east of the district of Nordwestmecklenburg, Mecklenburg-Western Pomerania, Germany. This town is the administrative center of the bureau Neukloster-Warin, which includes eight more communes.

Neukloster is close to the cities of Lübeck, Wismar and Schwerin and is part of the Hamburg Metropolitan Region.

== Geography ==
Neukloster is located at the Neuklostersee (Lake Neukloster), which originates from the Ice Age. The area around Neukloster belongs to the outmost north-western part of the Sternberger Seenlandschaft (Seascape of Sternberg). Neukloster is approx. 45 km (28 mi) away from Rostock and approx. 20 km (12 mi) away from Wismar.

The villages Lübberstorf, Glasin, Zurow, Benz and Züsow border on Neukloster.

== History ==
The history of Neukloster goes back to the Middle Ages, like most of the other places around. In 1170 the Kussinger Burg (Kussinger Castle) already existed in today's city limits of Neukloster. It is supposed that the center of the castle was located in the center of today's city center.

In the Middle Ages the Kloster Sonnenkamp (Sonnenkamp Convent) was located in the smaller village of Parchow. During this period, that area was hard-fought and it was exposed to the violence of the Middle Ages. The convent was relocated to Neukloster. This convent in Neukloster was first mentioned in 1219. The castle tumbled down with time, nevertheless the convent developed into a cultural and commercial center for this region. The convent was closed in the year of 1555. Its wealth and real estate went to the property of the Lords of Mecklenburg.

After Thirty Years' War, in 1648, Neukloster, Wismar and some closer places, fell under the lordship of Sweden. During this period of time, Neukloster was confronted with impecuniousness and balefulness, but after all, Neukloster endured this time until 1803. In that year, the Swedish occupation decided to lease Neukloster (and all other areas in Mecklenburg) to Mecklenburg-Schwerin for 100 years. After these 100 years, Neukloster and all other leased areas around, were annexed to Mecklenburg.

Neukloster became more important for the region, when the "Lehrerseminar" (seminar for teachers) moved from Ludwigslust to that small town, in 1862. Two years later, the "Landesblindenanstalt" (state's home for the blind) was founded in Neukloster. The population increased quickly, trade and industry were booming. In 1887, Neukloster was linked to the local railroad network.

In 1938, Neukloster received its town charter; the population doubled in the years after World War II, from 2,500 to almost 5,000 inhabitants. During the German Democratic Republic, 1949–1990, the landscape of Neukloster changed dramatically. Neukloster got a small town appearance. Many buildings were built, i.e. a campground, a movie theater, an old people's home, a stadium, schools, a kindergarten, the building of the Catholic Church and the market place.

Within the "Städebauförderung" (urban development sponsorship), Neukloster has been renovated since 1991.

== Transport connection ==
Neukloster is connected with the Bundesautobahn 20 (interstate #20). The Bundesstraße 192 (highway #192) (Wismar–Neubrandenburg) is only 3 km (1.9 mi) away from Neukloster. The railroad station is closed. To go farer distances, it is recommended to take the railroad station in Bad Kleinen or Rostock.

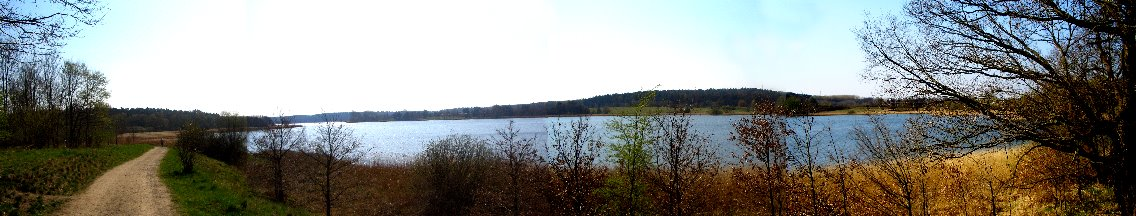
Lake Neukloster
