= Bundesautobahn 241 =

Federal motorway in Germany

A 241
- Bundesautobahn 241

Route information
- Length: 32 km (20 mi)
- History: Became a portion of A 14 in 2006

Location
- Country: Germany
- States: Mecklenburg-Vorpommern

Highway system
- Roads in Germany; Autobahns; List; Federal; List; State; E-roads

Bundesautobahn 241 (translates from German as Federal Motorway 241, short form Autobahn 241, abbreviated as BAB 241 or A 241) was an autobahn in Germany. It led around Schwerin and is now part of the A 14.

An extension of the autobahn to the A 20 had been planned in 1992, but failed to be realized due to financial and environmental factors. The current extension will not be finished before 2009.

The former A 241 never carried much traffic because Schwerin can be reached from the A 24, a much shorter connection. Also, Wismar could only be reached from the A 241 by driving through narrow avenues, so that the B 106 became the preferred route. More traffic can be expected to flow once the gap is closed and the junction Schwerin-Süd is finished.

On 24 August 2006 the section between the Kreuz Wismar and Jesendorf junctions was opened for traffic. This 11 km long segment of the road cost over €50 million to construct. Once completed, the A 241 will be renumbered as part of the A 14.

== Exit list ==
(1)	Wismar-Ost (unofficial name) B 105
(2)	Wismar 4-way interchange A 20
(3)	Jesendorf
	Bridge (planned)
	Bridge (planned)
(4)	Schwerin-Nord B 104
	Wildlife crossing 50 m
(5)	Schwerin-Ost (later Schwerin-Mitte) B 321
	Schwerin-Süd (planned)
(7)	Schwerin 3-way interchange A 24
	Connection to A 14 planned
