= German Museum of Technology =

Museum in Berlin, Germany

Deutsches Technikmuseum
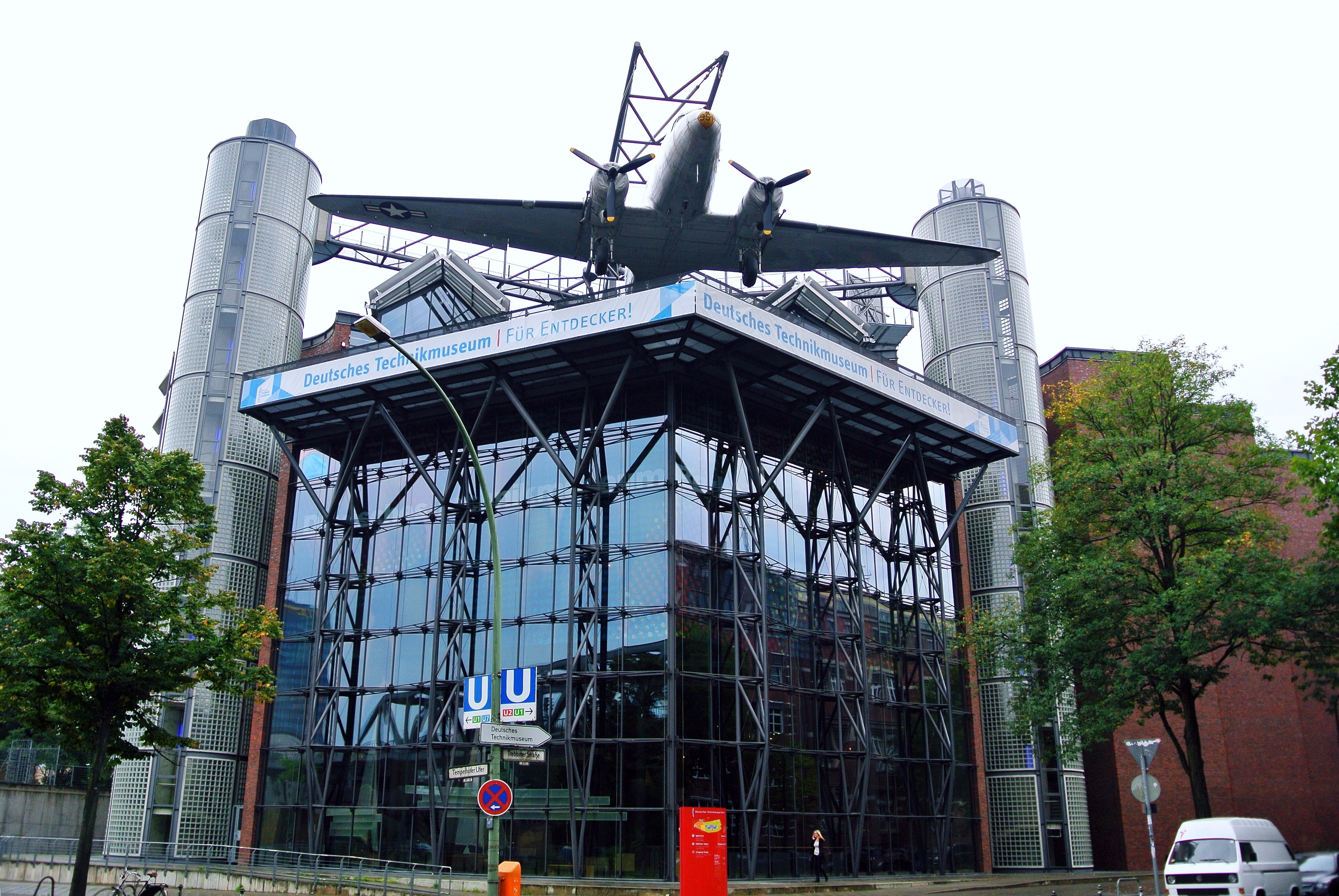
- New building on Landwehr Canal
- Established: 1982
- Location: Trebbiner Straße 9, Berlin (Kreuzberg), Germany
- Coordinates: 52°29′55″N 13°22′39″E
- Type: Science museum; Technology museum
- Visitors: 494,317 (2010)
- Website: www.sdtb.de

View from the museum featuring the Raisin Bomber

Deutsches Technikmuseum Berlin (German Museum of Technology) in Berlin, Germany is a museum of science and technology, and exhibits a large collection of historical technical artifacts. The museum's main emphasis originally was on rail transport, but today it also features exhibits of various sorts of industrial technology. In 2003, it opened both maritime and aviation exhibition halls in a newly built extension. The museum also contains a science center called Spectrum.

== History ==
The Museum of Traffic and Technology (Museum für Verkehr und Technik) was founded in 1982 and assumed the tradition of the Royal Museum of Traffic and Construction (Königliches Verkehrs- und Baumuseum) which was opened in the former Hamburger Bahnhof station building in 1906. The present-day museum is located on the former freight yard attached to the Anhalter Bahnhof in the Kreuzberg district of Berlin, including two historic roundhouses and several office buildings.

Renamed Deutsches Technikmuseum in 1996, the exhibition area was gradually expanded. An adjacent new building complex was inaugurated in 2003, topped by a prominent US Air Force Douglas C-47B "Raisin Bomber", which can be seen with ease from the top of the Fernsehturm and formerly at the Tempelhof Airport.

== Collections ==
=== Locomotives ===
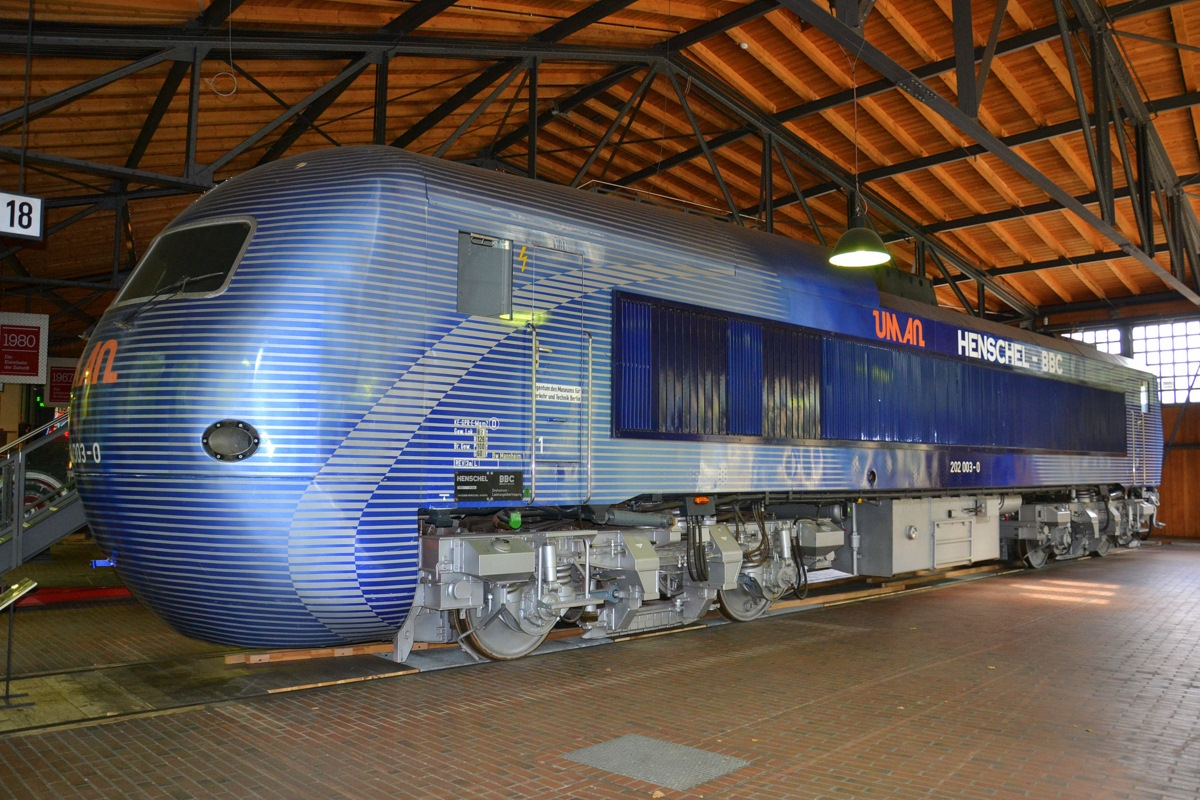
Henschel-BBC DE2500 202-003

An extensive railway collection opened in 1987/88 in the rebuilt 19th century roundhouses of the Anhalter Bahnhof locomotive depot (Bahnbetriebswerk) that had lain derelict for about 30 years. The 33 tracks illustrate the history of rail transport, including the deportations of Jews and others by the Deutsche Reichsbahn in The Holocaust. The exhibition also features a H0 scale model of the Anhalter Bahnhof track installations.

Locomotives on display include:

==== Steam ====
Inside the driver's cab of the 50 001

- 17 008, a Prussian S 10, which has been sectioned.
- 50 001 of DRB Class 50

==== Other ====
- E 19 01, one of four members of DRG Class E 19 (1938)
- 118 075 of DR Class V 180
- V 200 018, of DB Class V 200 (1957)
- 202 003-0, one of three Henschel-BBC DE2500 prototypes (1971 or 1974)

=== Aircraft ===
A large aviation section beside the C-47 houses numerous aircraft from the single Jeannin Stahltaube to a Lufthansa Junkers Ju 52 (Spanish aircraft built by CASA under license) and an Arado Ar 79. The museum addresses the flight enthusiasm of the early 20th century and its abuse in the German re-armament building up the Luftwaffe, documented by an Arado Ar 96, a wrecked Junkers Ju 87 Stuka dive bomber and the current restoration of a Focke-Wulf Fw 200 Condor as well as by one of three preserved Messerschmitt Bf 110, a Flak cannon, and a V-1 flying bomb built by Mittelbau-Dora concentration camp inmates at the Mittelwerk site. Post-war aircraft including a VFW-Fokker 614 and the Cessna 172P that Mathias Rust flew to the Moscow Red Square during the Cold War have also been added to the exhibition.

The remains of Avro Lancaster B III JA914 are displayed. This aircraft served with 57 Squadron as DX-O. It was shot down over Berlin in September 1943 and crashed into a lake opposite Zahrensdorf.

=== Computers ===
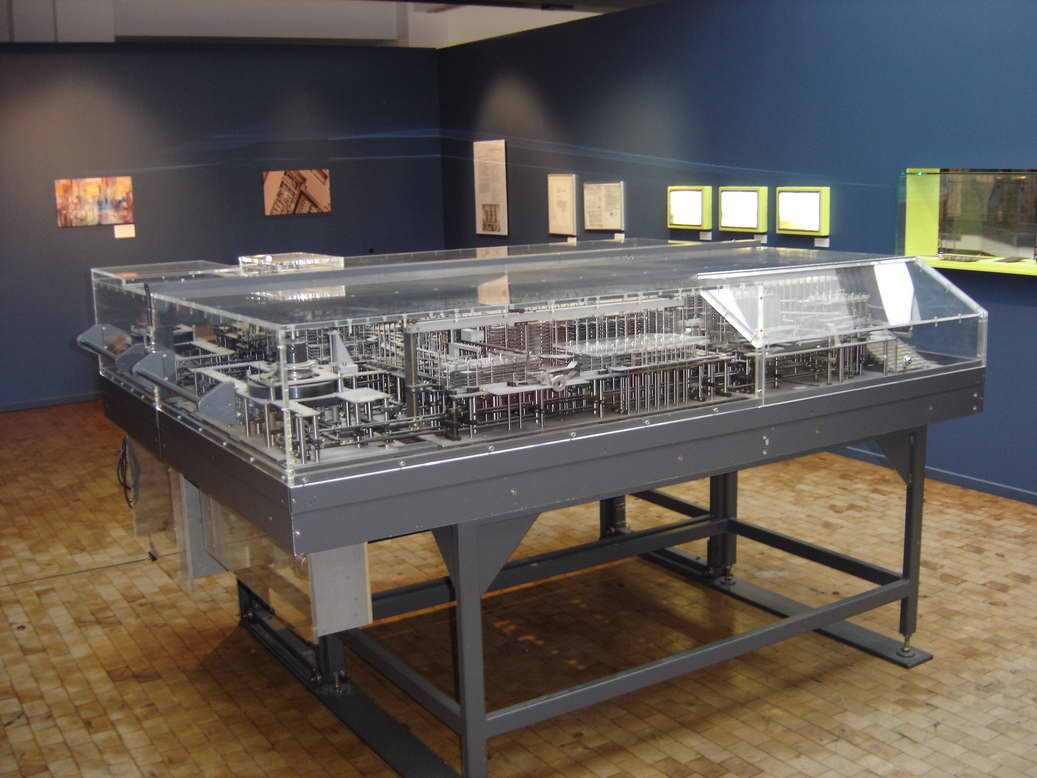
Zuse Z1 replica

On 15 May 2002, a special exhibition opened which featured the inventions of computer pioneer Konrad Zuse, including a replica of the Z1 and several other Zuse computers.

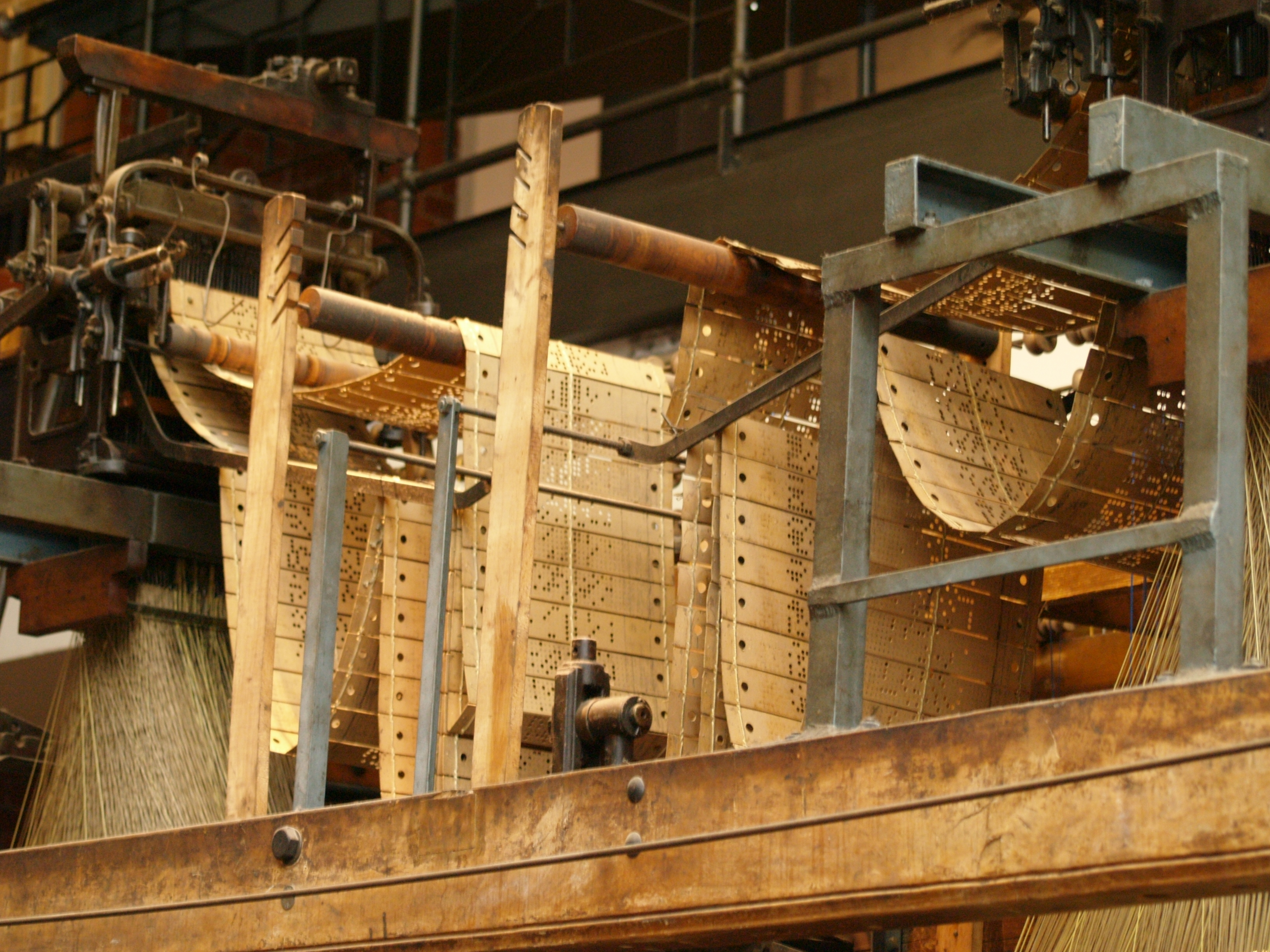
Punched cards in use in a Jacquard loom.

== Buildings ==
Water wheel

The museum has two windmills (one German, one Dutch), a brewery, and a forge powered by a water wheel.
