= Kobrow =

- Municipality
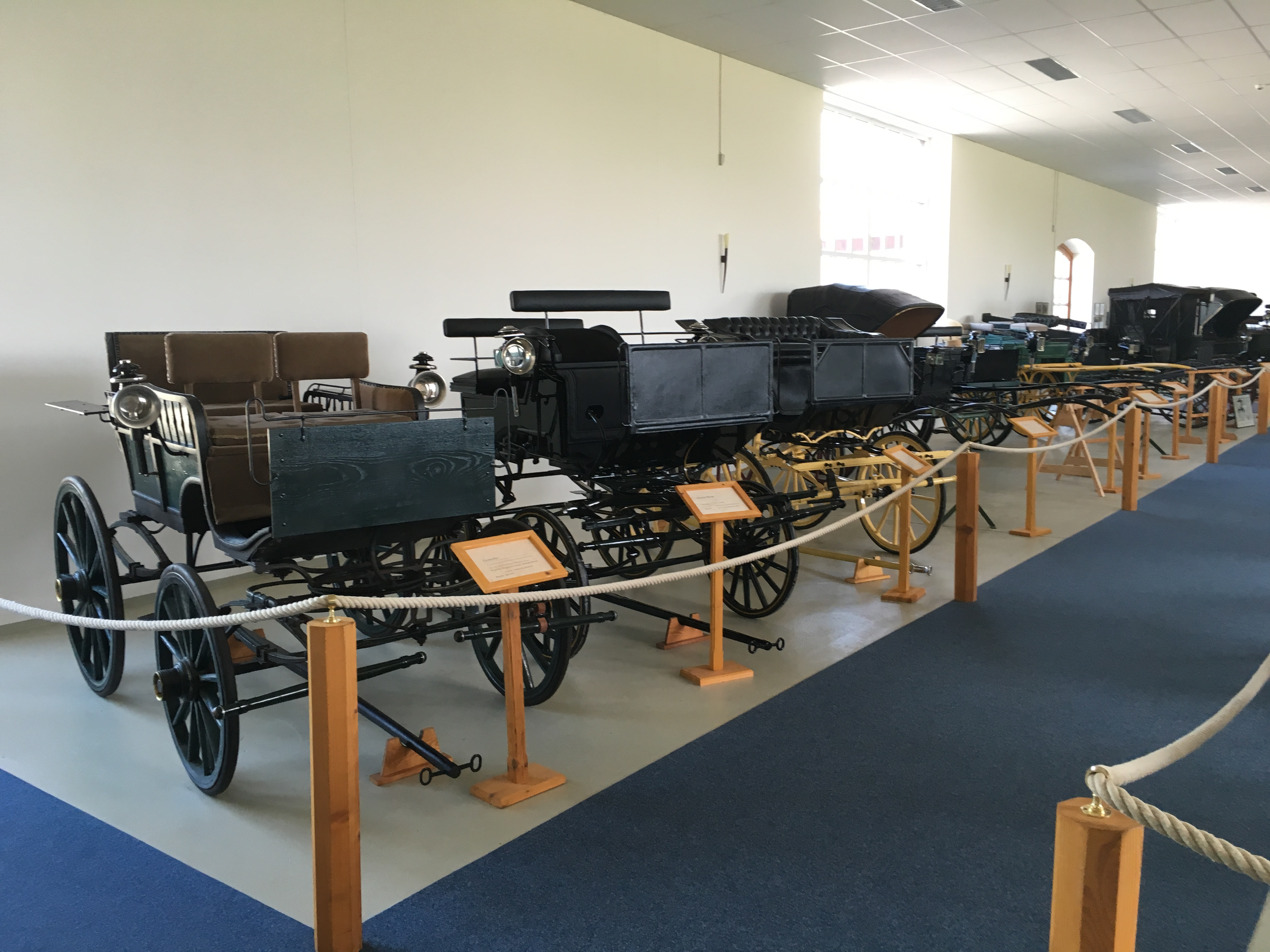
- Mecklenburgisches Kutschenmuseum (coach museum) in Kobrow

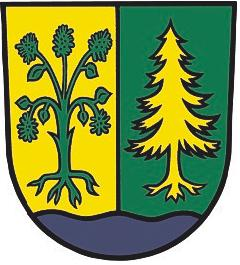
- Coat of arms

- Location of Kobrow within Ludwigslust-Parchim district
- Interactive map of Kobrow
- Location within Germany Location within Mecklenburg-Vorpommern
- Coordinates: 53°41′N 11°48′E
- Country: Germany
- State: Mecklenburg-Vorpommern
- District: Ludwigslust-Parchim
- Municipal assoc.: Sternberger Seenlandschaft
- Subdivisions: 5

Government
  - Mayor: Norbert Rethmann

Area
  - Total: 37.45 km^{2} (14.46 sq mi)
- Elevation: 35 m (115 ft)

Population (2025-12-31)
  - Total: 377
  - Density: 10.1/km^{2} (26.1/sq mi)
- Time zone: UTC+01:00 (CET)
  - Summer (DST): UTC+02:00 (CEST)
- Postal codes: 19406
- Dialling codes: 03847
- Vehicle registration: PCH
- Website: amt-ssl.de

Kobrow is a municipality in the Ludwigslust-Parchim district, in Mecklenburg-Vorpommern, Germany.
