= Ventschow station =

Railway station in Germany

Ventschow
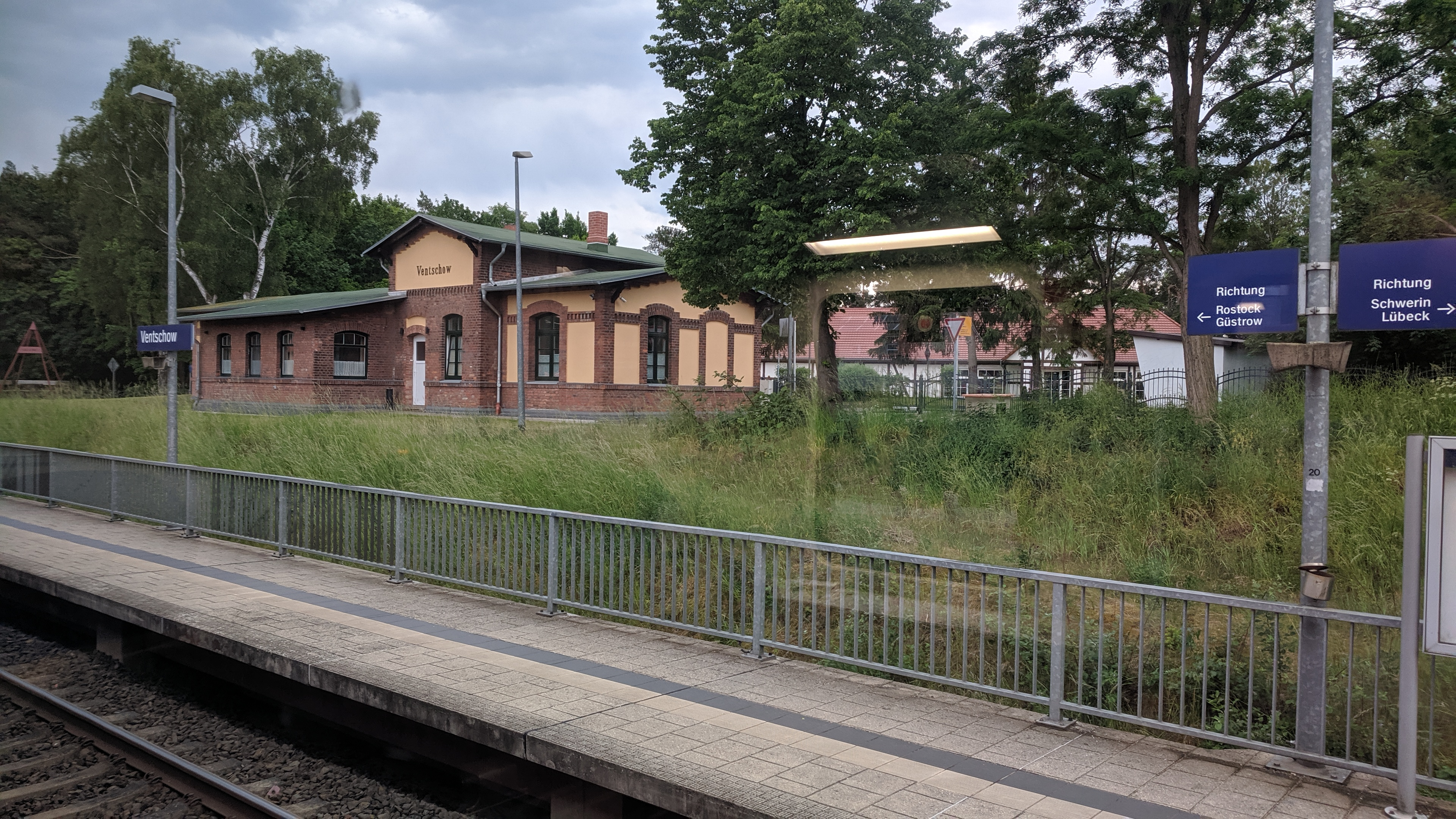
- 2019

General information
- Location: Hauptstraße; 19417 Ventschow; Mecklenburg-Vorpommern; Germany
- Coordinates: 53°47′14″N 11°34′46″E
- Owner: Deutsche Bahn
- Operator: DB Netz; DB Station&Service
- Lines: Bad Kleinen–Rostock railway (KBS 100)
- Platforms: 2 side platforms
- Tracks: 2
- Train operators: DB Regio Nordost
- Connections: RE 1RE 4

Construction
- Parking: yes
- Cycle facilities: no
- Accessible: yes

Other information
- Station code: 6407
- DS100 code: WVE
- IBNR: 8013186
- Category: 6
- Website: www.bahnhof.de

History
- Opened: before 1881
- Electrified: 12 April 1986; 40 years ago

Services
Preceding station	DB Regio Nordost	Following station
Bad Kleinen towards Hamburg Hbf	RE 1	Blankenberg (Meckl) towards Rostock Hbf
Bad Kleinen towards Bützow	RE 4	Blankenberg (Meckl) towards Szczecin Główny or Ueckermünde Stadthafen
Location
- Location within Mecklenburg-Vorpommern Location within Germany Location within Europe

Ventschow station is a railway station in the municipality of Ventschow, located in the Nordwestmecklenburg district in Mecklenburg-Vorpommern, Germany.
