= Witzin =

- Municipality
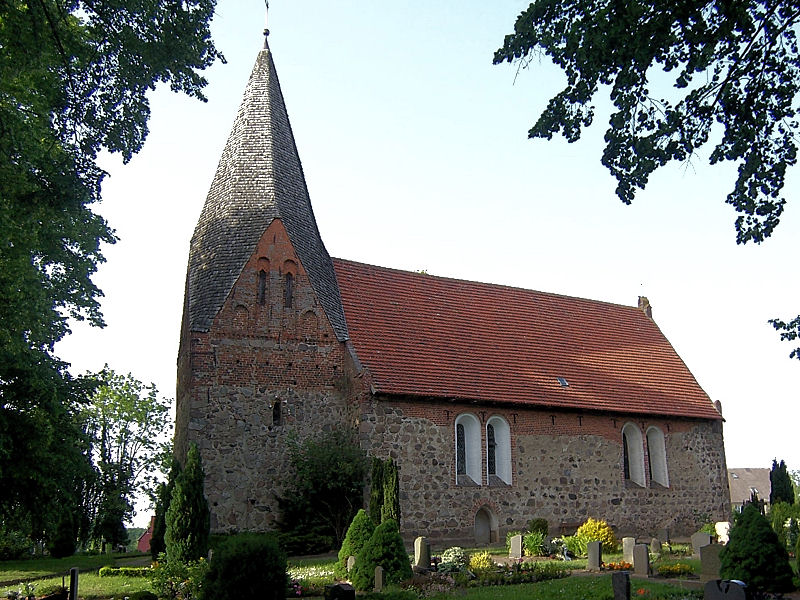
- Church

- Location of Witzin within Ludwigslust-Parchim district
- Interactive map of Witzin
- Location within Germany Location within Mecklenburg-Vorpommern
- Coordinates: 53°43′N 11°55′E
- Country: Germany
- State: Mecklenburg-Vorpommern
- District: Ludwigslust-Parchim
- Municipal assoc.: Sternberger Seenlandschaft
- Subdivisions: 2

Government
  - Mayor: Bruno Urbschat

Area
  - Total: 18.79 km^{2} (7.25 sq mi)
- Elevation: 30 m (98 ft)

Population (2025-12-31)
  - Total: 448
  - Density: 23.8/km^{2} (61.8/sq mi)
- Time zone: UTC+01:00 (CET)
  - Summer (DST): UTC+02:00 (CEST)
- Postal codes: 19406
- Dialling codes: 038481
- Vehicle registration: PCH
- Website: amt-ssl.de

Witzin is a municipality in the Ludwigslust-Parchim district, in Mecklenburg-Vorpommern, Germany.
