= Metelsdorf =

- Municipality
- Coat of arms

- Location of Metelsdorf within Nordwestmecklenburg district
- Interactive map of Metelsdorf
- Location within Germany Location within Mecklenburg-Vorpommern
- Coordinates: 53°51′N 11°28′E
- Country: Germany
- State: Mecklenburg-Vorpommern
- District: Nordwestmecklenburg
- Municipal assoc.: Dorf Mecklenburg-Bad Kleinen

Government
  - Mayor: Hannelore Gantzkow

Area
  - Total: 8.17 km^{2} (3.15 sq mi)
- Elevation: 30 m (98 ft)

Population (2025-12-31)
  - Total: 479
  - Density: 58.6/km^{2} (152/sq mi)
- Time zone: UTC+01:00 (CET)
  - Summer (DST): UTC+02:00 (CEST)
- Postal codes: 23972
- Dialling codes: 03841
- Vehicle registration: NWM
- Website: www.amt-dorf-mecklenburg.de

Metelsdorf is a municipality in the Nordwestmecklenburg district, in Mecklenburg-Vorpommern, Germany.
