= Weitendorf =

- Municipality
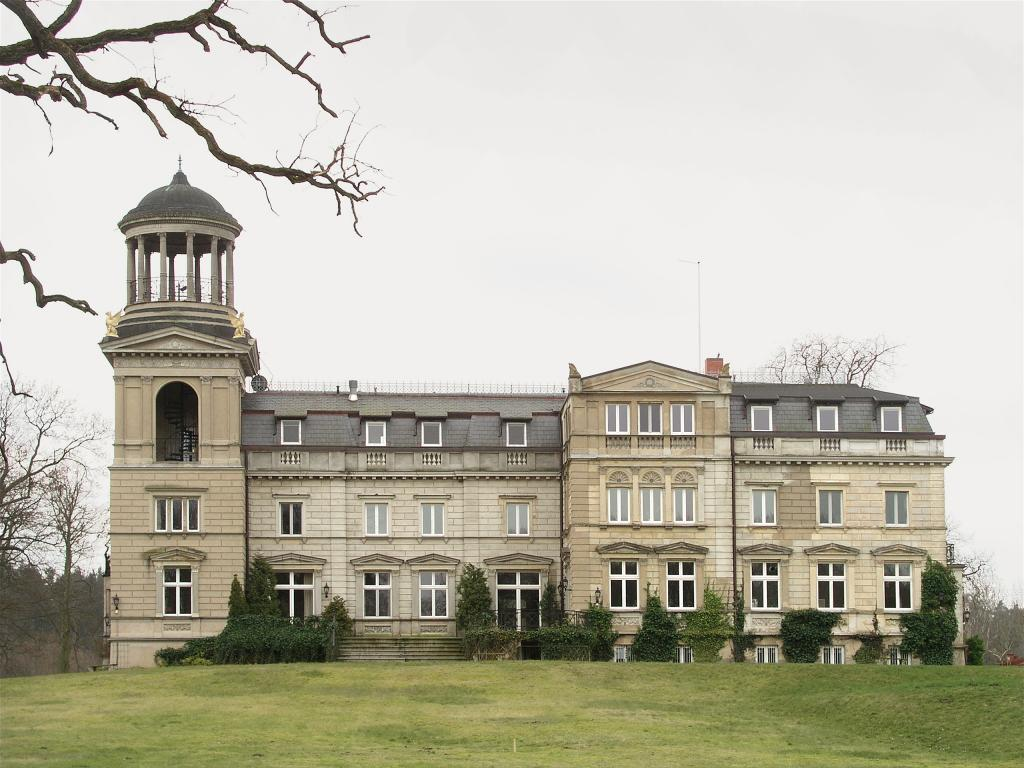
- Kaarz Castle

- Location of Weitendorf within Ludwigslust-Parchim district
- Interactive map of Weitendorf
- Location within Germany Location within Mecklenburg-Vorpommern
- Coordinates: 53°43′N 11°45′E
- Country: Germany
- State: Mecklenburg-Vorpommern
- District: Ludwigslust-Parchim
- Municipal assoc.: Sternberger Seenlandschaft
- Subdivisions: 5

Government
  - Mayor: Bernd Knoll

Area
  - Total: 42.22 km^{2} (16.30 sq mi)
- Elevation: 15 m (49 ft)

Population (2025-12-31)
  - Total: 316
  - Density: 7.48/km^{2} (19.4/sq mi)
- Time zone: UTC+01:00 (CET)
  - Summer (DST): UTC+02:00 (CEST)
- Postal codes: 19406
- Dialling codes: 038483
- Vehicle registration: PCH
- Website: www.amt-ssl.de

Weitendorf (German pronunciation: [ˈvaɪtn̩dɔʁf]) is a municipality in the Ludwigslust-Parchim district, in Mecklenburg-Vorpommern, Germany.
