= Mustin =

- Municipality
- Location of Mustin within Ludwigslust-Parchim district
- Interactive map of Mustin
- Location within Germany Location within Mecklenburg-Vorpommern
- Coordinates: 53°42′N 11°58′E
- Country: Germany
- State: Mecklenburg-Vorpommern
- District: Ludwigslust-Parchim
- Municipal assoc.: Sternberger Seenlandschaft
- Subdivisions: 4

Government
  - Mayor: Bernd Löbel

Area
  - Total: 26.08 km^{2} (10.07 sq mi)
- Elevation: 45 m (148 ft)

Population (2025-12-31)
  - Total: 333
  - Density: 12.8/km^{2} (33.1/sq mi)
- Time zone: UTC+01:00 (CET)
  - Summer (DST): UTC+02:00 (CEST)
- Postal codes: 19406
- Dialling codes: 03847
- Vehicle registration: PCH
- Website: amt-ssl.de

Mustin is a municipality in the Ludwigslust-Parchim district, in Mecklenburg-Vorpommern, Germany.
