= Neukloster-Warin =

- Amt
- Map of Nordwestmecklenburg highlighting Neukloster-Warin
- Interactive map of Neukloster-Warin
- Location within Germany Location within Mecklenburg-Vorpommern
- Coordinates: 53°52′N 11°41′E
- Country: Germany
- State: Mecklenburg-Vorpommern
- District: Nordwestmecklenburg
- Seat: Neukloster
- Subdivisions: 9 municipalities

Area
  - Total: 245.67 km^{2} (94.85 sq mi)

Population (2025-12-31)
  - Total: 10,862
  - Density: 44.214/km^{2} (114.51/sq mi)
- Time zone: UTC+01:00 (CET)
  - Summer (DST): UTC+02:00 (CEST)
- Website: www.amt-neukloster-warin.de

Neukloster-Warin is an Amt in the district of Nordwestmecklenburg, in Mecklenburg-Vorpommern, Germany. The seat of the Amt is in Neukloster.

The Amt Neukloster-Warin consists of the following municipalities:

1. Bibow
2. Glasin
3. Jesendorf
4. Lübberstorf
5. Neukloster
6. Passee
7. Warin
8. Zurow
9. Züsow
