= Lübow =

- Municipality
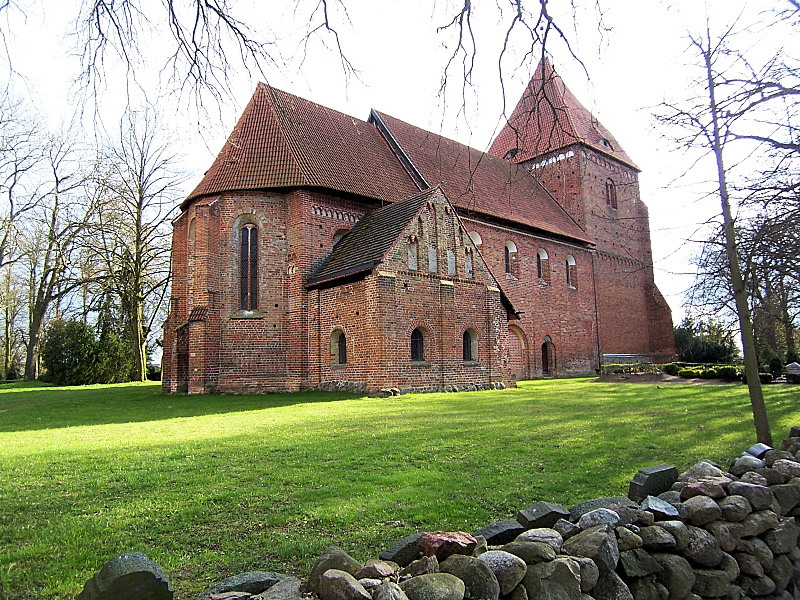
- Lübow Church

- Coat of arms

- Location of Lübow within Nordwestmecklenburg district
- Interactive map of Lübow
- Location within Germany Location within Mecklenburg-Vorpommern
- Coordinates: 53°51′N 11°31′E
- Country: Germany
- State: Mecklenburg-Vorpommern
- District: Nordwestmecklenburg
- Municipal assoc.: Dorf Mecklenburg-Bad Kleinen

Government
  - Mayor: Wolfgang Lüdtke

Area
  - Total: 35.24 km^{2} (13.61 sq mi)
- Elevation: 20 m (66 ft)

Population (2025-12-31)
  - Total: 1,564
  - Density: 44.38/km^{2} (114.9/sq mi)
- Time zone: UTC+01:00 (CET)
  - Summer (DST): UTC+02:00 (CEST)
- Postal codes: 23972
- Dialling codes: 03841
- Vehicle registration: NWM
- Website: www.amt-dorf-mecklenburg.de

Lübow is a municipality in the Nordwestmecklenburg district, in Mecklenburg-Vorpommern, Germany.
