= Groß Stieten =

- Municipality
- Location of Groß Stieten within Nordwestmecklenburg district
- Interactive map of Groß Stieten
- Location within Germany Location within Mecklenburg-Vorpommern
- Coordinates: 53°49′N 11°26′E
- Country: Germany
- State: Mecklenburg-Vorpommern
- District: Nordwestmecklenburg
- Municipal assoc.: Dorf Mecklenburg-Bad Kleinen

Government
  - Mayor: Christiane Berg

Area
  - Total: 6.50 km^{2} (2.51 sq mi)
- Elevation: 42 m (138 ft)

Population (2025-12-31)
  - Total: 587
  - Density: 90.3/km^{2} (234/sq mi)
- Time zone: UTC+01:00 (CET)
  - Summer (DST): UTC+02:00 (CEST)
- Postal codes: 23972
- Dialling codes: 03841
- Vehicle registration: NWM
- Website: www.amt-dorf-mecklenburg.de

Groß Stieten is a municipality in the Nordwestmecklenburg district, in Mecklenburg-Vorpommern, Germany.
