= Johannes Schulze =

German educator and administrator (1786-1869)

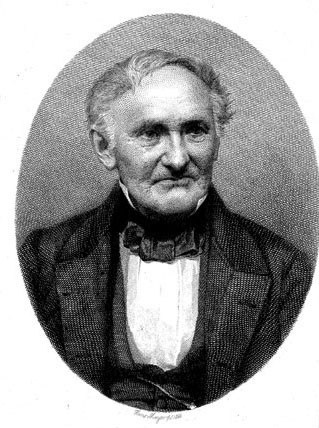
- Portrait by Hans Meyer

Johannes Schulze (actually Schultze; 15 January 1786 in Brüel, Mecklenburg-Schwerin – 20 February 1869 in Berlin) was a German educator and administrator.

== Biography ==
He studied at Halle, and taught at Weimar and Hanau. In 1813 he became chief counselor on education in Frankfurt, in 1815 a member of the Coblence consistory, and in 1818 referendary to the Prussian Ministry of Education in Berlin, a post he kept until 1840, and one in which his great work of reforming the educational methods in the higher schools of Prussia was performed. In 1849 he was appointed director of the Department of Education, an office he resigned ten years afterwards.

Schulze was an ardent Hegelian and edited Hegel's Phänomenologie des Geistes (2d ed. 1841), and some of Winckelmann's works.

Schulze had one of the greatest private libraries in Germany and in 1870 Northwestern University purchased Schulze's 20,000-volume library, increasing its holdings tenfold.
