= Passee =

- Municipality
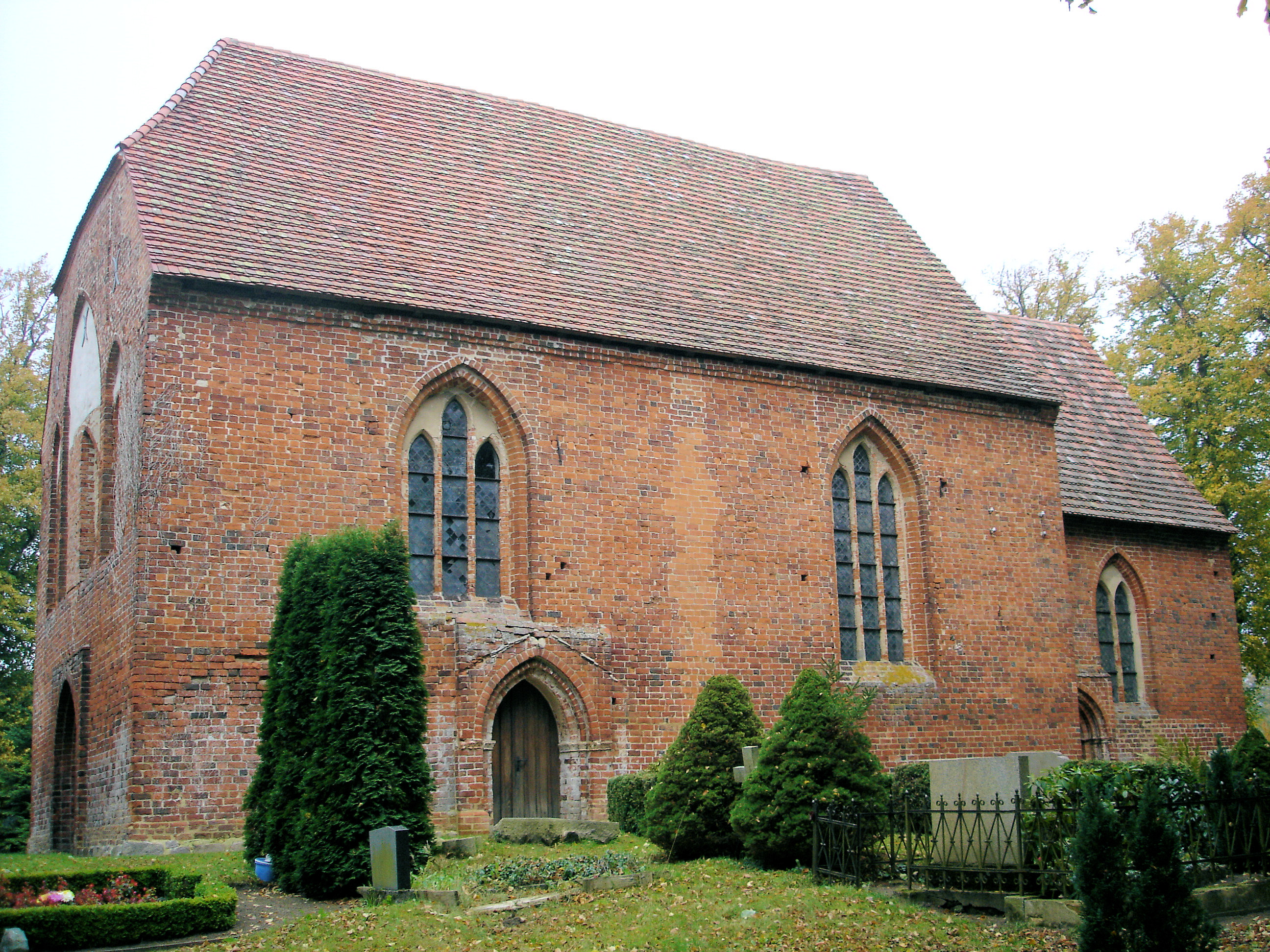
- Medieval church in Passee

- Location of Passee within Nordwestmecklenburg district
- Interactive map of Passee
- Location within Germany Location within Mecklenburg-Vorpommern
- Coordinates: 53°58′N 11°46′E
- Country: Germany
- State: Mecklenburg-Vorpommern
- District: Nordwestmecklenburg
- Municipal assoc.: Neukloster-Warin

Government
  - Mayor: Adolf Wittek

Area
  - Total: 16.14 km^{2} (6.23 sq mi)
- Elevation: 89 m (292 ft)

Population (2025-12-31)
  - Total: 183
  - Density: 11.3/km^{2} (29.4/sq mi)
- Time zone: UTC+01:00 (CET)
  - Summer (DST): UTC+02:00 (CEST)
- Postal codes: 23992
- Dialling codes: 038429
- Vehicle registration: NWM
- Website: www.neukloster.de

Passee is a municipality in the Nordwestmecklenburg district, in Mecklenburg-Vorpommern, Germany.
