= Bundesstraße 71 =

Federal highway in Germany

B 79
- Bundesstraße 79

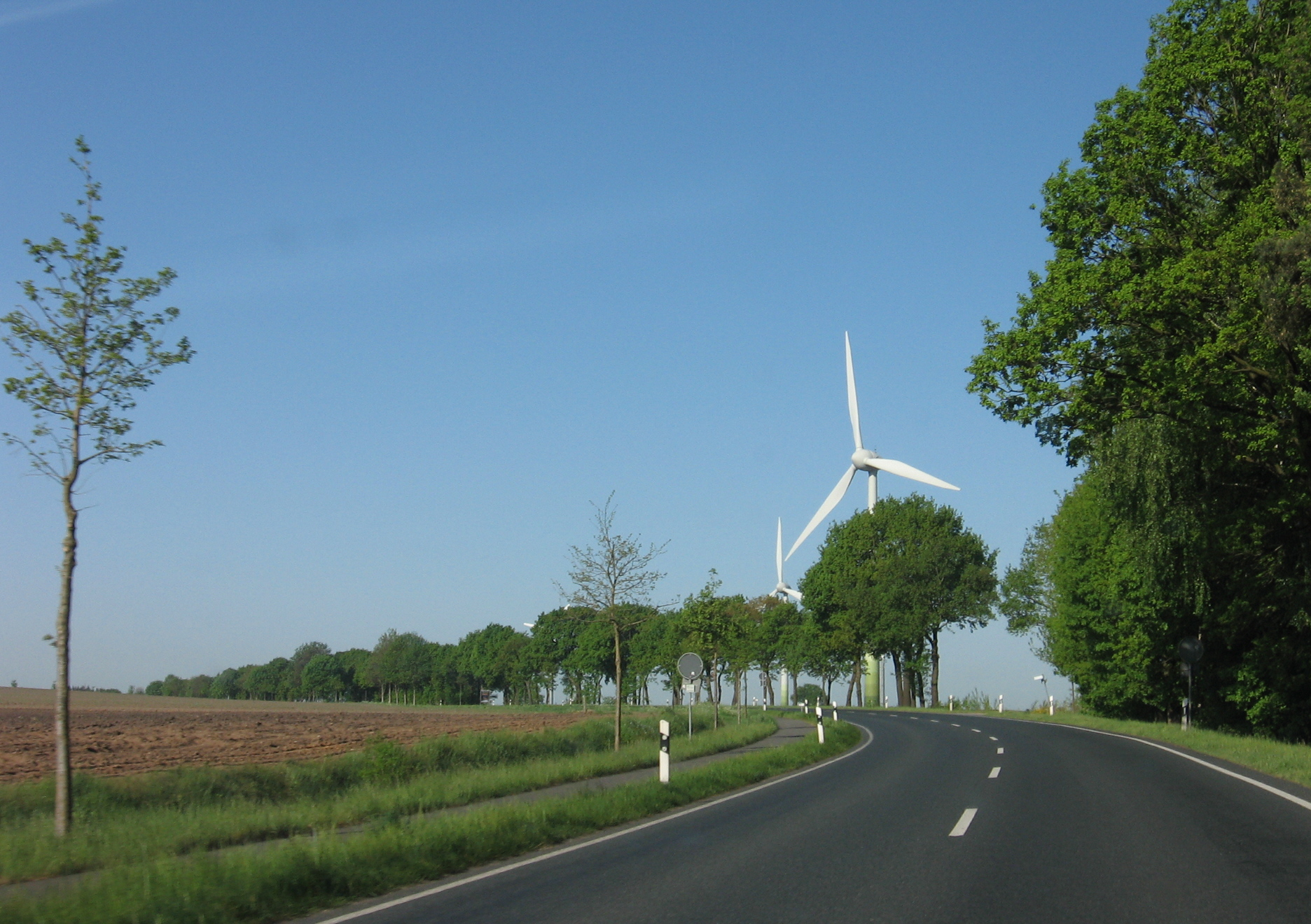
- Bundesstraße 71 near Bremervörde

Route information
- Length: 391 km (243 mi)

Major junctions
- Northwest end: B 6 in Bremerhaven
- Southeast end: Könnern near Halle (Saale) in Saxony-Anhalt

Location
- Country: Germany
- States: Bremen, Lower Saxony, Saxony-Anhalt

Highway system
- Roads in Germany; Autobahns; List; Federal; List; State; E-roads

The Bundesstraße 71 (abbr: B 71) is one of the longer German federal roads, numbered in the 60s and 70s series. It begins at the B 6 in Bremerhaven by the Unterweser and ends in Könnern near Halle (Saale) in Saxony-Anhalt.

At its start, it serves as one of the east-west links across the Elbe-Weser Triangle and follows a gentle curve via Bremervörde (48 km, briefly meeting the B 74) and Zeven (71 km), crossing the Hansa Line A 1 (83 km) to the district town of Rotenburg (Wümme) (97 km). Here, it crosses the B 75 and continues past the Lüneburg Heath to Soltau (133 km), where it intersects with the B 3. As it moves eastward, the road passes through heathland to Uelzen (190 km), where it again intersects another major federal route, the B 4. It then runs through the Elbufer-Drawehn Nature Park and crosses the former Inner German Border and present-day state border between Lower Saxony and Saxony-Anhalt at kilometre marker 222.

In Salzwedel (233 km), the B 71 leaves the Wendland to the left and turns southeast. In the Altmark, it passes through villages and sparsely populated heathland. At Gardelegen, it meets the B 188. After Gardelegen, it heads south, passing through the Colbitz-Letzlingen Heath for 30 km. After 335 km, the B 71 enters Magdeburg, where it crosses the A 14, A 2, and B 1, passing through the old cathedral city in a north-south direction as part of the Magdeburg Ring. It continues for another 56 km as part of the Romanesque Road (Straße der Romanik) through the heart of the Anhalt region until, at Könnern, it reconnects with the B 6, the road it originally left at Bremerhaven, 26 km before Halle, the largest city in Saxony-Anhalt. The entire route covers a distance of 391 km.

== See also ==
- List of federal highways in Germany
