= Bundesautobahn 14 =

Federal motorway in Germany

A 14
- Bundesautobahn 14

Route information
- Length: 310 km (190 mi)

Major junctions
- North end: B 105 in Wismar
- South end: A 4 in Nossen

Location
- Country: Germany
- States: Mecklenburg-Vorpommern, Brandenburg, Saxony-Anhalt, Saxony

Highway system
- Roads in Germany; Autobahns; List; Federal; List; State; E-roads
← A 13	→ A 15

Bundesautobahn 14 (translates from German as Federal Motorway 14, short form Autobahn 14, abbreviated as BAB 14 or A 14) is an autobahn in eastern Germany.

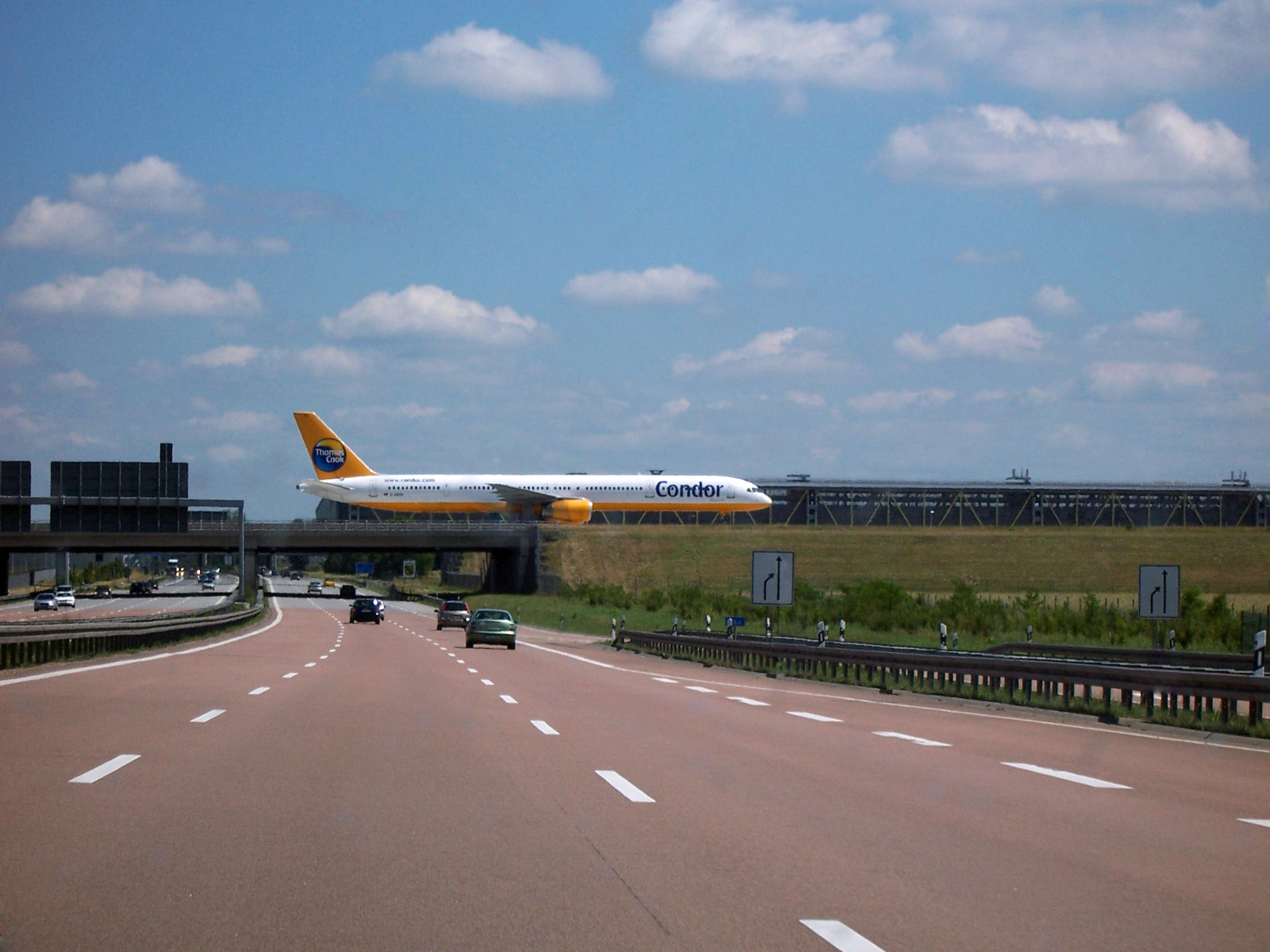
A plane moving on a bridge over the road at Leipzig-Halle Airport

The route comprises two disconnected sections:

- The old A 241. A North–south route in Mecklenburg-Vorpommern which runs from Wismar to Schwerin.
- The original A 14. A West–east route which starts at the A 2 near Magdeburg in Saxony-Anhalt and terminates at the A 4 at Dresden in Saxony. On the way, it serves Halle and Leipzig.

Construction is underway to connect the two sections.

== Under construction ==
- Lüderitz – Tangerhütte (Opening in 2023).

== Exit list ==
Legend:

- I/C - Interchange, I/S - Intersection, RSA - Rest and service area, OBR - Overhead bridge restaurant, R/R - Restaurant and rest plaza, L/B - Layby, V/P - Vista point, TN - tunnel, T/P - Toll plaza, BR - Bridge
- C - Cloverleaf, S - Stack, T-A - Trumpet-A, T-B - Trumpet-B, DT - Directional-T/Y, SDT - Semi-Directional-T/Y, P-Y - Partial-Y, D - Diamond, P-C - Partial cloverleaf, D-D - Diverging diamond, D-R - Direct ramp

	(1)	Kritzow B 105
	(1)	Wismar 4-way interchange A 20
		Talbrücke 75 m
	(3)	Jesendorf
		Rest area Pröbbower see
		Grünbrücke 34 m
		Brücke Mühlenbach 500 m
		Liessower Brücke 340 m
		Grünbrücke 30 m
	(4)	Schwerin-Nord B 104 (planned)
		Brücke 90 m
		Schweriner See (planned)
		Grünbrücke 35 m
	(5)	Schwerin-Ost (later Schwerin-Mitte) B 321
		Brücke Störwasserstraße 80 m
		Schwerin-Süd (planned)
		Rest area Plater Berg
	(7)	Schwerin 4-way interchange A 24
		Rest area Ludwigsluster Kanal
		Grünbrücke 50 m
	(8)	Ludwigslust B 191
		Bahnbrücke 90 m
	(9)	Grabow B 5 B 191
		Eldetalbrücke 506 m
		Grünbrücke 40 m
		Rest area Meynbach
	(10)	Groß Warnow
		Grünbrücke 50 m
		Löcknitzbrücke 200 m
	(11)	Karstädt
----
		Rest area Löcknitztal (planned)
		Grünbrücke 58 m (planned)
		Wittenberge (planned)
		Elbebrücke 1107 m (planned)
		Alandbrücke 103 m (planned)
		Elbe-Aland-Niederung (planned)
		Seehausen-Nord (planned)
		Seehausen (planned)
		Grünbrücke 53 m (planned)
		Wildtierdurchlass 60 m (planned)
		Biesebrücke 83 m (planned)
		Osterburg (planned)
		Grünbrücke 53 m (planned)
		Altmark (planned)
		Stendal-Mitte (planned)
		Uchtebrücke 310 m (planned)
		Stendal (planned)
		Stendal-Süd (planned)
		Lüderitz (planned)
		Brücke Kuhgrund 113 m (planned)
		Grünbrücke 50 m (planned)
		Dollgrabenbrücke 95 m (planned)
----
	(-)	Tangerhütte
		Rest area Colbitz-Letzlinger Heide (planned)
		Grünbrücke 53 m
	(-)	Colbitz B 189
	(-)	Wolmirstedt B 189
----
		Wolmirstedt (planned)
		Ohrebrücke 103 m / 114 m (planned)
		Haldensleben (planned)
		Mittellandkanalbrücke 80 m (planned)
----
	(1)	Dahlenwarsleben B 71
	(2)	Magdeburg 4-way interchange A 2
	(3)	Magdeburg-Stadtfeld B 1
		Schrotetalbrücke 492 m
	(4)	Wanzleben
	(5)	Magdeburg-Sudenburg B 81
		Rest area Sülzegrund
	(6)	Magdeburg-Reform B 71
		Sülzetalbrücke 196 m
		Bahnbrücke 60 m
	(7)	Schönebeck (Elbe) B 246a
		Bahnbrücke 50 m
		Rest area Dreihöhenberg
	(8)	Calbe (Saale)
		Bodetalbrücke 326 m
	(9)	Staßfurt
		Rest area Alter Postweg
	(10)	Kreuz Bernburg 4-way interchange A 36 B 6 B 185
		Wippertalbrücke 330 m
	(11)	Plötzkau
		Saalebrücke 805 m
		Rest area Saaleaue
	(12)	Könnern B 71
		Services Plötzetal
		Plötzetalbrücke 210 m
	(13)	Löbejün
		Straßenbrücke 50 m
Intersection		3-way interchange Dreieck Halle-Nord A 143
	(15)	Halle-Trotha B 6
		Götschetalbrücke 731 m
		Talbrücke 140 m
		Rest area Petersberg
	(16)	Halle-Tornau
	(17)	Halle/Peißen B 100
		Bahnbrücke 60 m
		Bahnbrücke 50 m
	(18)	Halle-Ost
		Rest area Kabelsketal
	(19)	Gröbers
	(20)	Schkeuditzer Kreuz A 9
	(21)	Schkeuditz (Flughafen Leipzig/Halle)
	(22)	Leipzig-Nord
		Rest area Birkenwald
	(23)	Leipzig-Mitte B 2
	(24)	Leipzig-Messegelände
	(25)	Leipzig-Nordost B 87
	(26)	Leipzig-Ost B 6
	(27)	Kleinpösna
	(28)	Parthenaue 3-way interchange A 38
	(29)	Naunhof
	(30)	Klinga
		Services Muldental
	(31)	Grimma B 107
		Muldetalbrücke 350 m
	(32)	Mutzschen
	(33)	Leisnig
		Rest area Mühlenberg
	(34)	Döbeln-Nord B 169
	(35)	Döbeln-Ost B 175
		Raststätte Hansens Holz
		Rest area Hansens Holz
	(36)	Nossen-Nord B 175
	(37)	Nossen-Ost B 101
	(38)	Nossen 3-way interchange A 4
