= Hohen Viecheln =

- Municipality
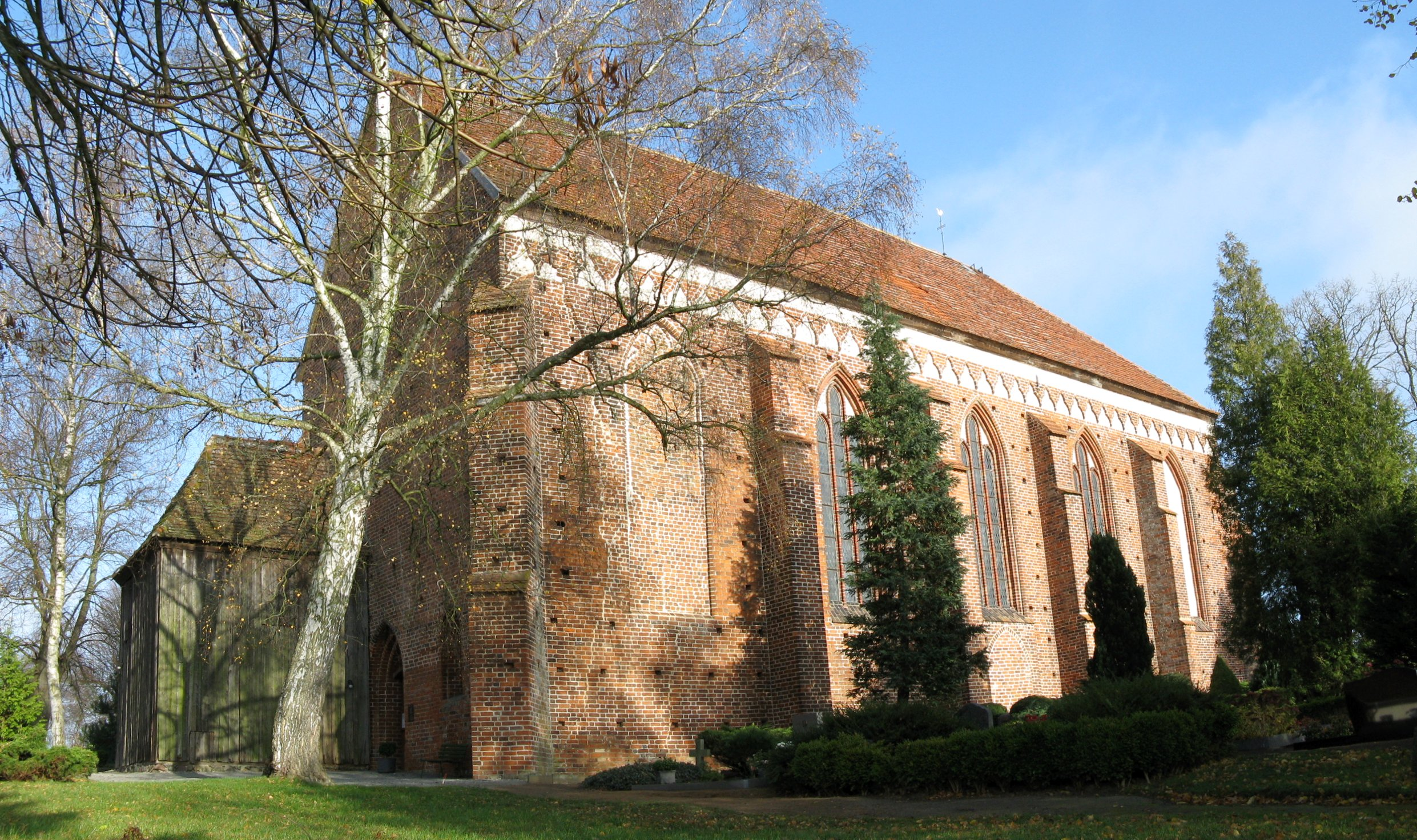
- Church in Hohen Viecheln

- Location of Hohen Viecheln within Nordwestmecklenburg district
- Interactive map of Hohen Viecheln
- Location within Germany Location within Mecklenburg-Vorpommern
- Coordinates: 53°46′N 11°31′E
- Country: Germany
- State: Mecklenburg-Vorpommern
- District: Nordwestmecklenburg
- Municipal assoc.: Dorf Mecklenburg-Bad Kleinen

Government
  - Mayor: Lothar Glöde

Area
  - Total: 18.96 km^{2} (7.32 sq mi)
- Elevation: 36 m (118 ft)

Population (2025-12-31)
  - Total: 724
  - Density: 38.2/km^{2} (98.9/sq mi)
- Time zone: UTC+01:00 (CET)
  - Summer (DST): UTC+02:00 (CEST)
- Postal codes: 23996
- Dialling codes: 038423
- Vehicle registration: NWM
- Website: www.amt-dorf-mecklenburg.de

Hohen Viecheln is a municipality in the Nordwestmecklenburg district, in Mecklenburg-Vorpommern, Germany. It lies on the north shore of Lake Schwerin and about 15 kilometers (about 9.4 miles) south of Wismar.
