= Dorf Mecklenburg-Bad Kleinen =

- Amt
- Map of Nordwestmecklenburg highlighting Dorf Mecklenburg-Bad Kleinen
- Interactive map of Dorf Mecklenburg-Bad Kleinen
- Location within Germany Location within Mecklenburg-Vorpommern
- Coordinates: 53°49′N 11°26′E
- Country: Germany
- State: Mecklenburg-Vorpommern
- District: Nordwestmecklenburg
- Seat: Dorf Mecklenburg
- Subdivisions: 9 municipalities

Area
  - Total: 217.32 km^{2} (83.91 sq mi)

Population (2025-12-31)
  - Total: 13,997
  - Density: 64.407/km^{2} (166.81/sq mi)
- Time zone: UTC+01:00 (CET)
  - Summer (DST): UTC+02:00 (CEST)
- Website: www.amt-dorfmecklenburg-badkleinen.de

Dorf Mecklenburg-Bad Kleinen is an Amt in the district of Nordwestmecklenburg, in Mecklenburg-Vorpommern, Germany. The seat of the Amt is in Dorf Mecklenburg.

The Amt Dorf Mecklenburg-Bad Kleinen consists of the following municipalities:

1. Bad Kleinen
2. Barnekow
3. Bobitz
4. Dorf Mecklenburg
5. Groß Stieten
6. Hohen Viecheln
7. Lübow
8. Metelsdorf
9. Ventschow
