= Langen Jarchow =

- Ortsteil of Kloster Tempzin
- Interactive map of Langen Jarchow
- Location within Germany Location within Mecklenburg-Vorpommern
- Coordinates: 53°46′N 11°39′E
- Country: Germany
- State: Mecklenburg-Vorpommern
- District: Ludwigslust-Parchim
- Municipality: Kloster Tempzin

Area
  - Total: 10.67 km^{2} (4.12 sq mi)
- Elevation: 35 m (115 ft)

Population (2015-12-31)
  - Total: 260
  - Density: 24/km^{2} (63/sq mi)
- Time zone: UTC+01:00 (CET)
  - Summer (DST): UTC+02:00 (CEST)
- Postal codes: 19412
- Dialling codes: 038483
- Vehicle registration: PCH

Langen Jarchow (German pronunciation: [ˈlaŋən ˈjaʁçoː]) is a former municipality in the Ludwigslust-Parchim district, in Mecklenburg-Vorpommern, Germany. Since 1 January 2016 it is part of the new municipality Kloster Tempzin.
