= Hohen Pritz =

- Municipality
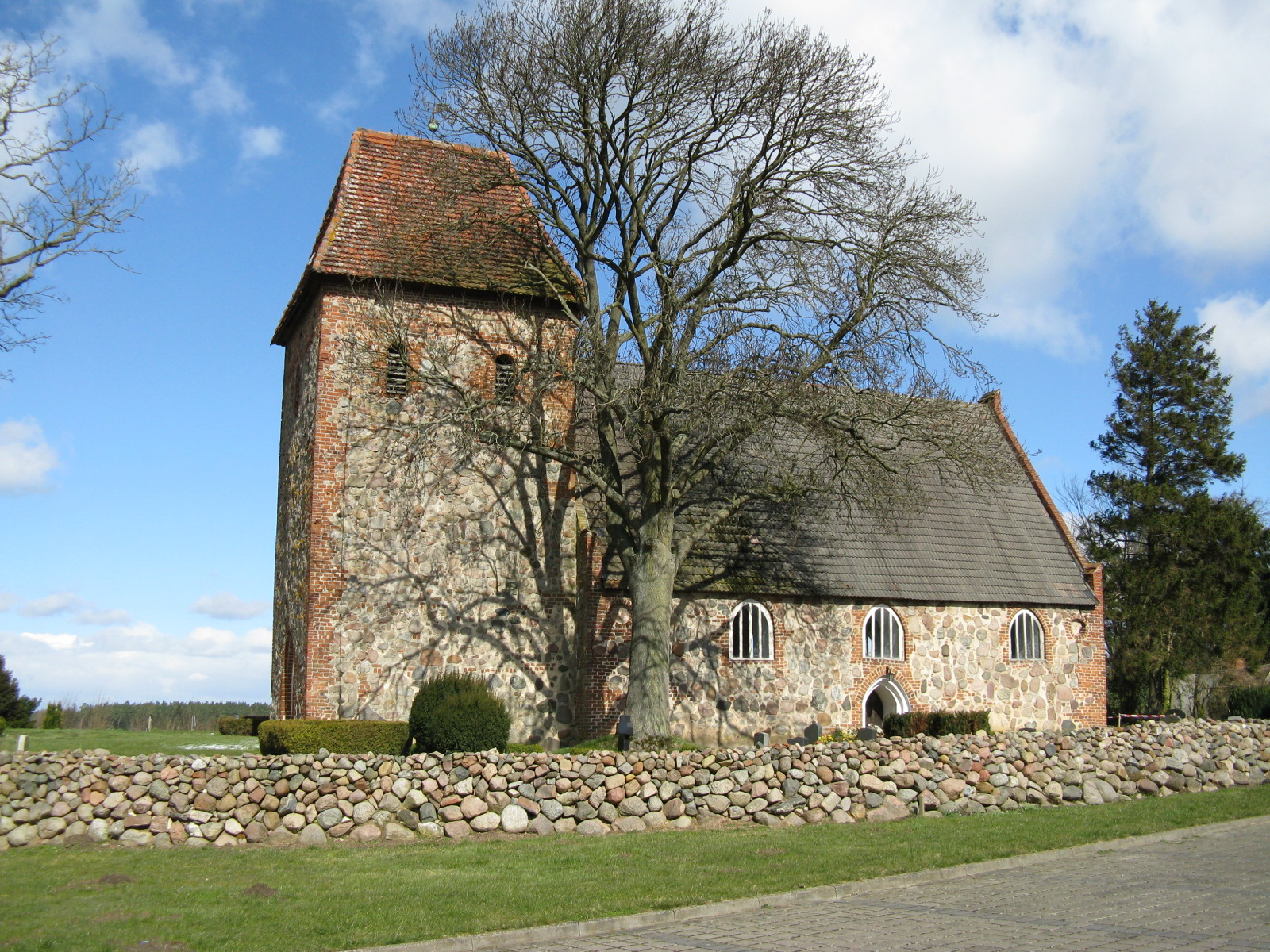
- Church

- Location of Hohen Pritz within Ludwigslust-Parchim district
- Interactive map of Hohen Pritz
- Location within Germany Location within Mecklenburg-Vorpommern
- Coordinates: 53°37′N 11°54′E
- Country: Germany
- State: Mecklenburg-Vorpommern
- District: Ludwigslust-Parchim
- Municipal assoc.: Sternberger Seenlandschaft
- Subdivisions: 4 Ortsteile

Government
  - Mayor: Jan Kessel

Area
  - Total: 23.77 km^{2} (9.18 sq mi)
- Elevation: 58 m (190 ft)

Population (2025-12-31)
  - Total: 370
  - Density: 16/km^{2} (40/sq mi)
- Time zone: UTC+01:00 (CET)
  - Summer (DST): UTC+02:00 (CEST)
- Postal codes: 19406
- Dialling codes: 038485
- Vehicle registration: PCH
- Website: amt-ssl.de

Hohen Pritz is a municipality in the Ludwigslust-Parchim district, in Mecklenburg-Vorpommern, Germany.
