= Friedrich Schlie =

German art historian and archaeologist

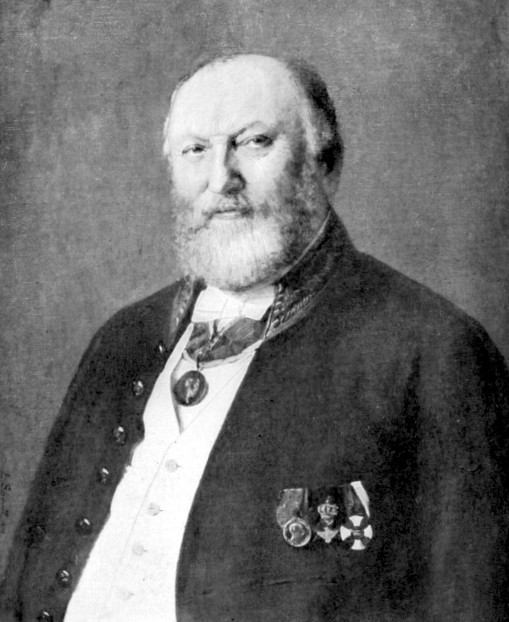
- Born: December 12, 1839; Brüel, Grand Duchy of Mecklenburg-Schwerin, German Confederation
- Died: July 21, 1902 (aged 62); Bad Kissingen, Kingdom of Bavaria, German Empire
- Education: Ludwig-Maximilians-Universität München
- Occupations: Historian, archaeologist

Friedrich Schlie (12 December 1839 – 21 July 1902) was a German art historian and archaeologist.

== Life ==
As the son of a Kantor and teacher, Schlie was taught by private tuition until his graduation examination in Rostock in 1863. He then studied philology and art history at the University of Rostock and the Ludwig-Maximilians-Universität München, graduating in 1867. After which he worked as an auxiliary secretary at the Prussian Archaeological Institute in Rome for 2 years. By 1869 he worked as a teacher at the several secondary schools in Mecklenburg before in 1877 becoming director of the Schweriner Kunstmuseum.

Friedrich Schlie received several honours, being made a Hofrat in 1882, Professor in 1891 and Geheimer Hofrat in 1899. He was a corresponding member of the Archaeological Institute in Rome and Berlin, as well as a permanent member of the committee of the international art historical congress. He also worked for the Society of Mecklenburgische History and Antiquity. In the years 1898 to 1902, he published his comprehensive five volume work "Kunst- und Geschichtsdenkmäler des Großherzogtums Mecklenburg-Schwerin" (Art and Art History of the Great-Dukedom of Mecklenburg-Schwerin"). He was also a friend and promoter of the famous archeologist Heinrich Schliemann.

A 1902 marble bust of Schlie by Ludwig Brunow is to be found in the State Museum Schwerin.

== Sources ==
- Hans-Günter Buchholz: Die Archäologenfreundschaft zwischen Heinrich Schliemann und Friedrich Schlie. Der Briefwechsel zweier bedeutender Archäologen, Mitteilungen aus dem Heinrich-Schliemann-Museum Ankershagen 3 (1995)
