= Kloster Tempzin =

- Municipality
- Location of Kloster Tempzin within Ludwigslust-Parchim district
- Interactive map of Kloster Tempzin
- Location within Germany Location within Mecklenburg-Vorpommern
- Coordinates: 53°45′N 11°40′E
- Country: Germany
- State: Mecklenburg-Vorpommern
- District: Ludwigslust-Parchim
- Municipal assoc.: Sternberger Seenlandschaft
- Subdivisions: 5

Area
  - Total: 24.95 km^{2} (9.63 sq mi)
- Elevation: 35 m (115 ft)

Population (2025-12-31)
  - Total: 572
  - Density: 22.9/km^{2} (59.4/sq mi)
- Time zone: UTC+01:00 (CET)
  - Summer (DST): UTC+02:00 (CEST)
- Postal codes: 19412
- Dialling codes: 038483
- Vehicle registration: PCH
- Website: www.amt-ssl.de

Kloster Tempzin (German pronunciation: [ˈkloːstɐ ˈtɛmptsiːn]) is a municipality in the Ludwigslust-Parchim district, in Mecklenburg-Vorpommern, Germany. It was created on 1 January 2016 by the merger of the former municipalities Langen Jarchow and Zahrensdorf. It takes its name from the former Tempzin monastery.

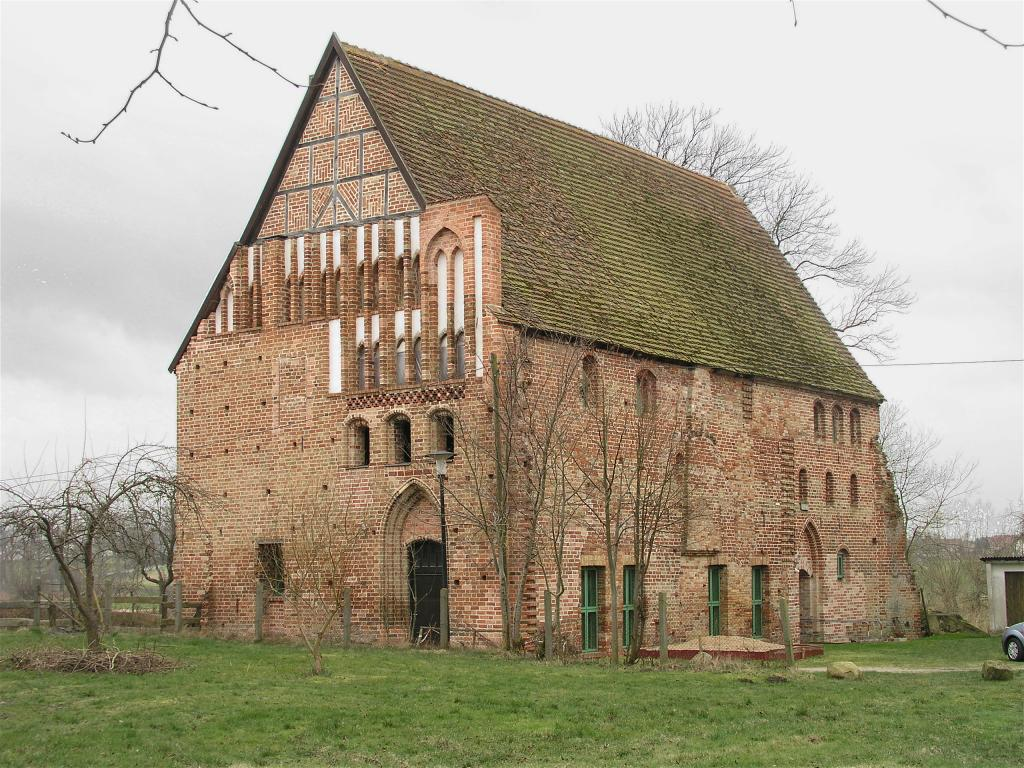
Warmhaus of the Tempzin monastery, 2007
