= Lübberstorf =

- Municipality
- Location of Lübberstorf within Nordwestmecklenburg district
- Interactive map of Lübberstorf
- Location within Germany Location within Mecklenburg-Vorpommern
- Coordinates: 53°52′N 11°43′E
- Country: Germany
- State: Mecklenburg-Vorpommern
- District: Nordwestmecklenburg
- Municipal assoc.: Neukloster-Warin

Government
  - Mayor: Rainer Levetzow

Area
  - Total: 12.99 km^{2} (5.02 sq mi)
- Elevation: 67 m (220 ft)

Population (2025-12-31)
  - Total: 236
  - Density: 18.2/km^{2} (47.1/sq mi)
- Time zone: UTC+01:00 (CET)
  - Summer (DST): UTC+02:00 (CEST)
- Postal codes: 23992
- Dialling codes: 038422
- Vehicle registration: NWM
- Website: www.neukloster.de

Lübberstorf is a municipality in the Nordwestmecklenburg district, in Mecklenburg-Vorpommern, Germany.

It is close to the cities of Lübeck, Wismar and Schwerin and is part of the Hamburg Metropolitan Region.
