= Bibow =

- Municipality
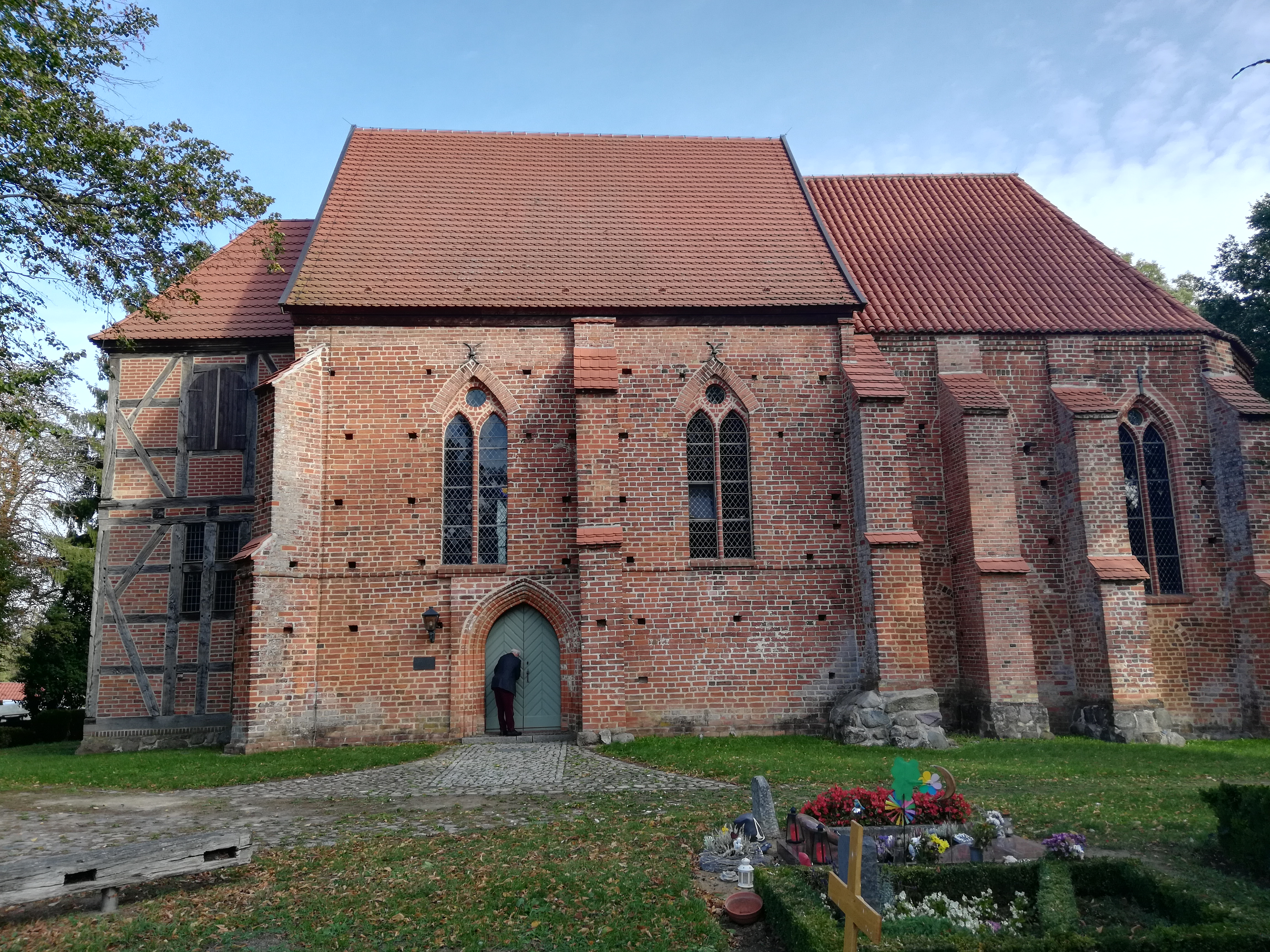
- Medieval village church in Bibow

- Location of Bibow within Nordwestmecklenburg district
- Interactive map of Bibow
- Location within Germany Location within Mecklenburg-Vorpommern
- Coordinates: 53°46′N 11°37′E
- Country: Germany
- State: Mecklenburg-Vorpommern
- District: Nordwestmecklenburg
- Municipal assoc.: Neukloster-Warin
- Subdivisions: 5

Government
  - Mayor: Dettlef Lukat

Area
  - Total: 23.12 km^{2} (8.93 sq mi)
- Elevation: 18 m (59 ft)

Population (2025-12-31)
  - Total: 344
  - Density: 14.9/km^{2} (38.5/sq mi)
- Time zone: UTC+01:00 (CET)
  - Summer (DST): UTC+02:00 (CEST)
- Postal codes: 19417
- Dialling codes: 038482
- Vehicle registration: NWM
- Website: www.amt-neukloster-warin.de

Bibow is a municipality in the Nordwestmecklenburg district, in Mecklenburg-Vorpommern, Germany.
