= Warin =

Town in Mecklenburg-Vorpommern, Germany

- Town
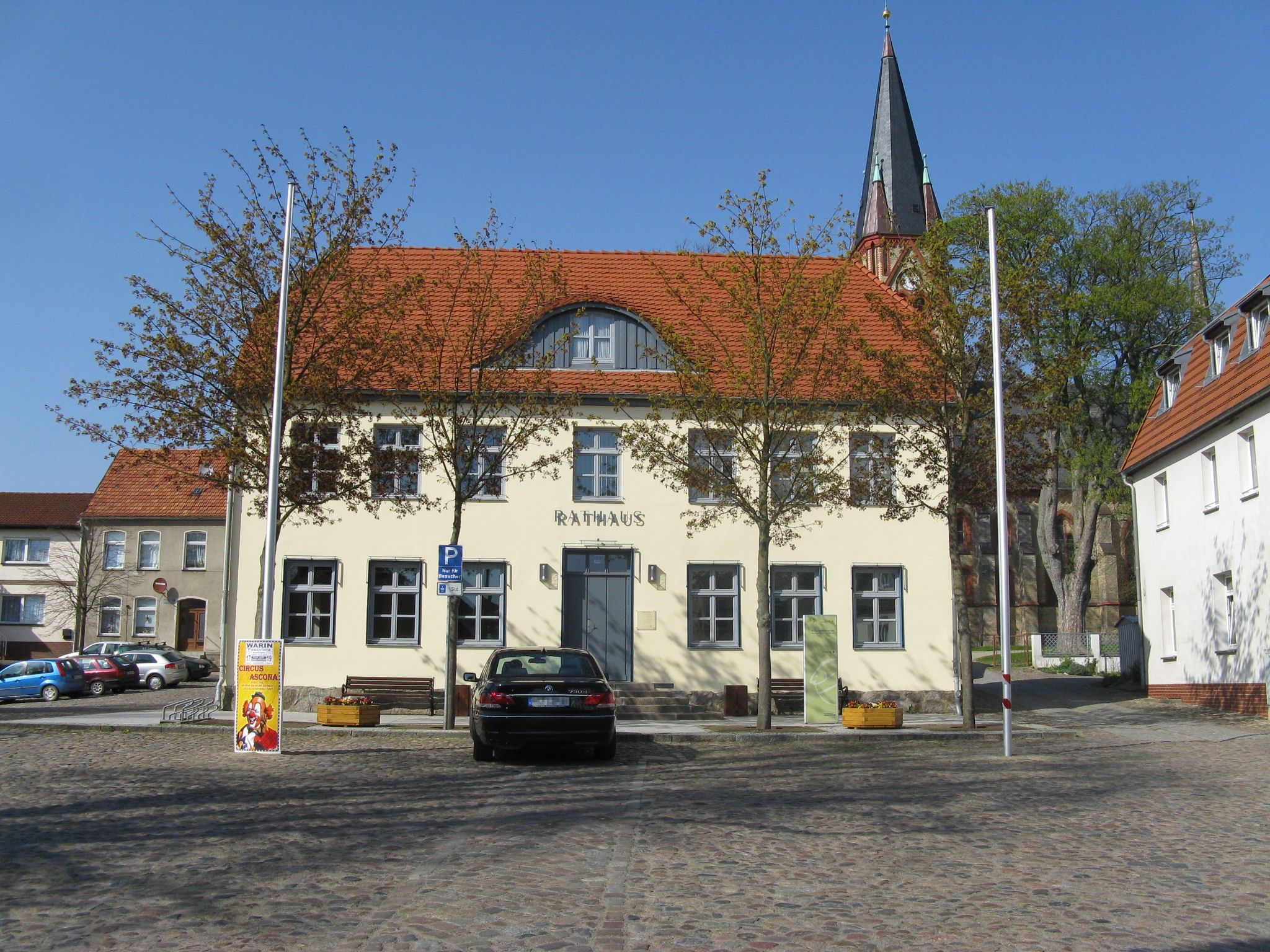
- Town hall

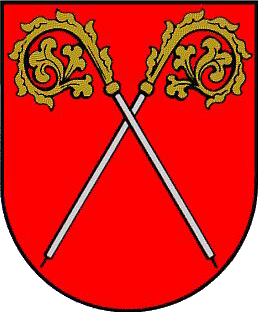
- Coat of arms

- Location of Warin within Nordwestmecklenburg district
- Interactive map of Warin
- Location within Germany Location within Mecklenburg-Vorpommern
- Coordinates: 53°47′N 11°41′E
- Country: Germany
- State: Mecklenburg-Vorpommern
- District: Nordwestmecklenburg
- Municipal assoc.: Neukloster-Warin

Government
  - Mayor: Björn Griese

Area
  - Total: 44.45 km^{2} (17.16 sq mi)
- Elevation: 30 m (98 ft)

Population (2025-12-31)
  - Total: 3,219
  - Density: 72.42/km^{2} (187.6/sq mi)
- Time zone: UTC+01:00 (CET)
  - Summer (DST): UTC+02:00 (CEST)
- Postal codes: 19417
- Dialling codes: 038482
- Vehicle registration: NWM
- Website: https://www.stadt-warin.eu/

Warin (German pronunciation: [vaˈʁiːn]) is a town in the Nordwestmecklenburg district, in Mecklenburg-Western Pomerania, Germany. It is situated 19 km southeast of Wismar.

Warin is a small town with a population of under 4,000 persons. Warin is situated 104 km from Hamburg to the west, and 43 km from the Baltic port-city of Rostock to the north east. The countryside around Warin is composed of forests, lakes, and agricultural land given over to cereal production and animal husbandry of various kinds. The lakes are popular with canoeists, and swimmers, and also provide beautiful lakeshore frontage for the residential properties which skirt the two lakes situated immediately north and south of the town. The forests are ideal for nature-trail rambles, and are not too extensive to get easily lost, before one will encounter a forest trail to regain one's proper direction back to town.

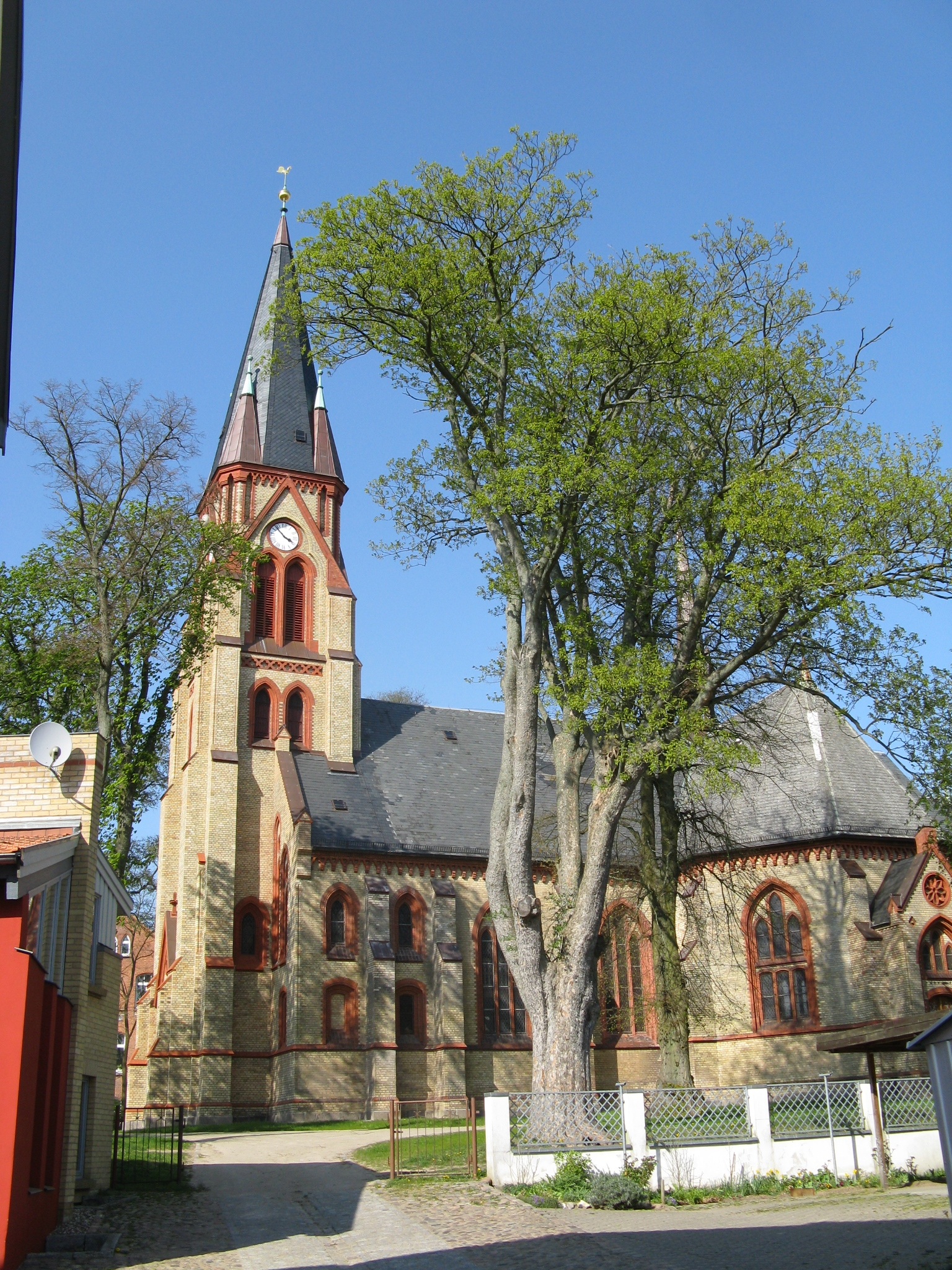
Church of Warin

The majority of transport needs are met by a network of minor roads. 2 km to the south of Warin, on the northern edge of Blankenberg, there is a railway line which ultimately connects to Berlin Hauptbahnhof, approximately 180 km, to the south east, should visitors wish to travel to Warin for a relaxing time, or for the Warinese to experience a dramatic change of pace in the metropolis of Berlin, as an alternative to Hamburg or Rostock.

There is also a small airport/field on the westerly outskirts of the town of Parchim, 42 km directly south. From this airport, small private planes and cargo planes with STOL characteristics can make use of the 3 km long runway to arrive or depart. There is also a designated Helipad area. As of May 2007, the airport has been acquired by Chinese entrepreneur and chairman of the board of Linde Group, Pang Yuliang. It was the first time a Chinese investor acquired permanent operating rights of an airport in Europe.

Although Warin has been a part of significant trade routes of the region, it has never been associated with much in the way of wealth. Even so, as of today, it is a very attractive town with well maintained public buildings, houses, cobbled streets and squares, and well kept gardens bounded by trimmed hedges. In short, Warin is very much the picture postcard town that would spring to mind as an example of the rural idyll of Germany. Which is how Mayor Hans-Peter Gossel likes it to be appreciated by prospective tourists from within Germany, the EU, and farther afield.
