= Züsow =

- Municipality
- Location of Züsow within Nordwestmecklenburg district
- Interactive map of Züsow
- Location within Germany Location within Mecklenburg-Vorpommern
- Coordinates: 53°55′N 11°40′E
- Country: Germany
- State: Mecklenburg-Vorpommern
- District: Nordwestmecklenburg
- Municipal assoc.: Neukloster-Warin

Government
  - Mayor: Manfred Juschkat

Area
  - Total: 19.38 km^{2} (7.48 sq mi)
- Elevation: 56 m (184 ft)

Population (2025-12-31)
  - Total: 293
  - Density: 15.1/km^{2} (39.2/sq mi)
- Time zone: UTC+01:00 (CET)
  - Summer (DST): UTC+02:00 (CEST)
- Postal codes: 23992
- Dialling codes: 038422
- Vehicle registration: NWM
- Website: www.neukloster.de

Züsow is a municipality in the Nordwestmecklenburg district, Mecklenburg-Vorpommern, Germany.
