= Zahrensdorf =

- Ortsteil of Kloster Tempzin
- Interactive map of Zahrensdorf
- Location within Germany Location within Mecklenburg-Vorpommern
- Coordinates: 53°45′N 11°40′E
- Country: Germany
- State: Mecklenburg-Vorpommern
- District: Ludwigslust-Parchim
- Municipality: Kloster Tempzin

Area
  - Total: 14.03 km^{2} (5.42 sq mi)
- Elevation: 30 m (98 ft)

Population (2015-12-31)
  - Total: 310
  - Density: 22/km^{2} (57/sq mi)
- Time zone: UTC+01:00 (CET)
  - Summer (DST): UTC+02:00 (CEST)
- Postal codes: 19406
- Dialling codes: 038483
- Vehicle registration: PCH

Zahrensdorf (German pronunciation: [ˈtsaːʁənsdɔʁf]) is a former municipality in the Ludwigslust-Parchim district, in Mecklenburg-Vorpommern, Germany. Since 1 January 2016, it is part of the new municipality Kloster Tempzin.
