= Zurow =

- Municipality
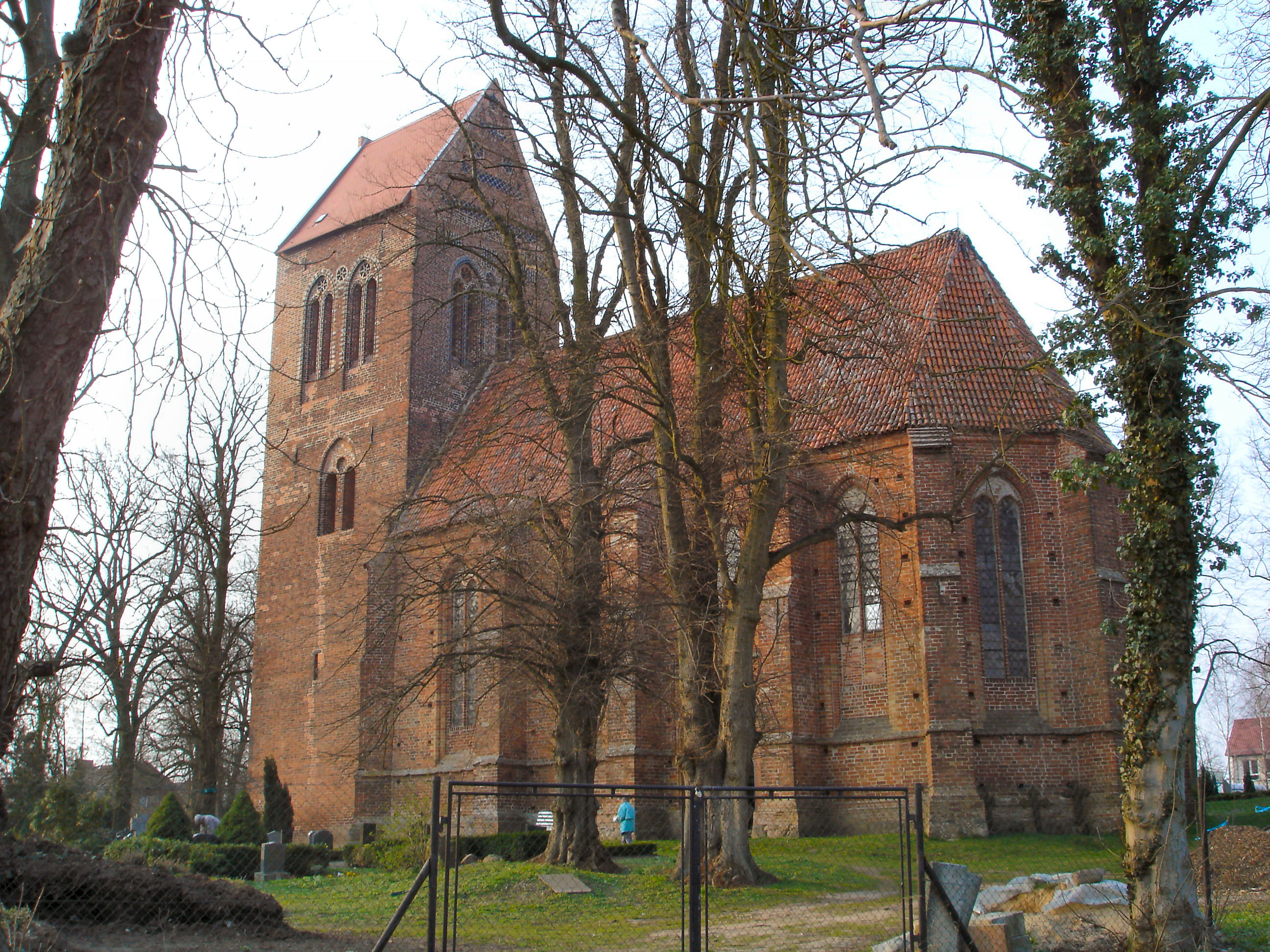
- Medieval church in Zurow

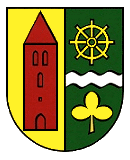
- Coat of arms

- Location of Zurow within Nordwestmecklenburg district
- Interactive map of Zurow
- Location within Germany Location within Mecklenburg-Vorpommern
- Coordinates: 53°52′N 11°37′E
- Country: Germany
- State: Mecklenburg-Vorpommern
- District: Nordwestmecklenburg
- Municipal assoc.: Neukloster-Warin

Government
  - Mayor: Paul Fedtke

Area
  - Total: 40.68 km^{2} (15.71 sq mi)
- Elevation: 48 m (157 ft)

Population (2025-12-31)
  - Total: 1,288
  - Density: 31.66/km^{2} (82.00/sq mi)
- Time zone: UTC+01:00 (CET)
  - Summer (DST): UTC+02:00 (CEST)
- Postal codes: 23992
- Dialling codes: 038422
- Vehicle registration: NWM
- Website: www.neukloster.de

Zurow is a municipality in the Nordwestmecklenburg district, in Mecklenburg-Vorpommern, Germany.

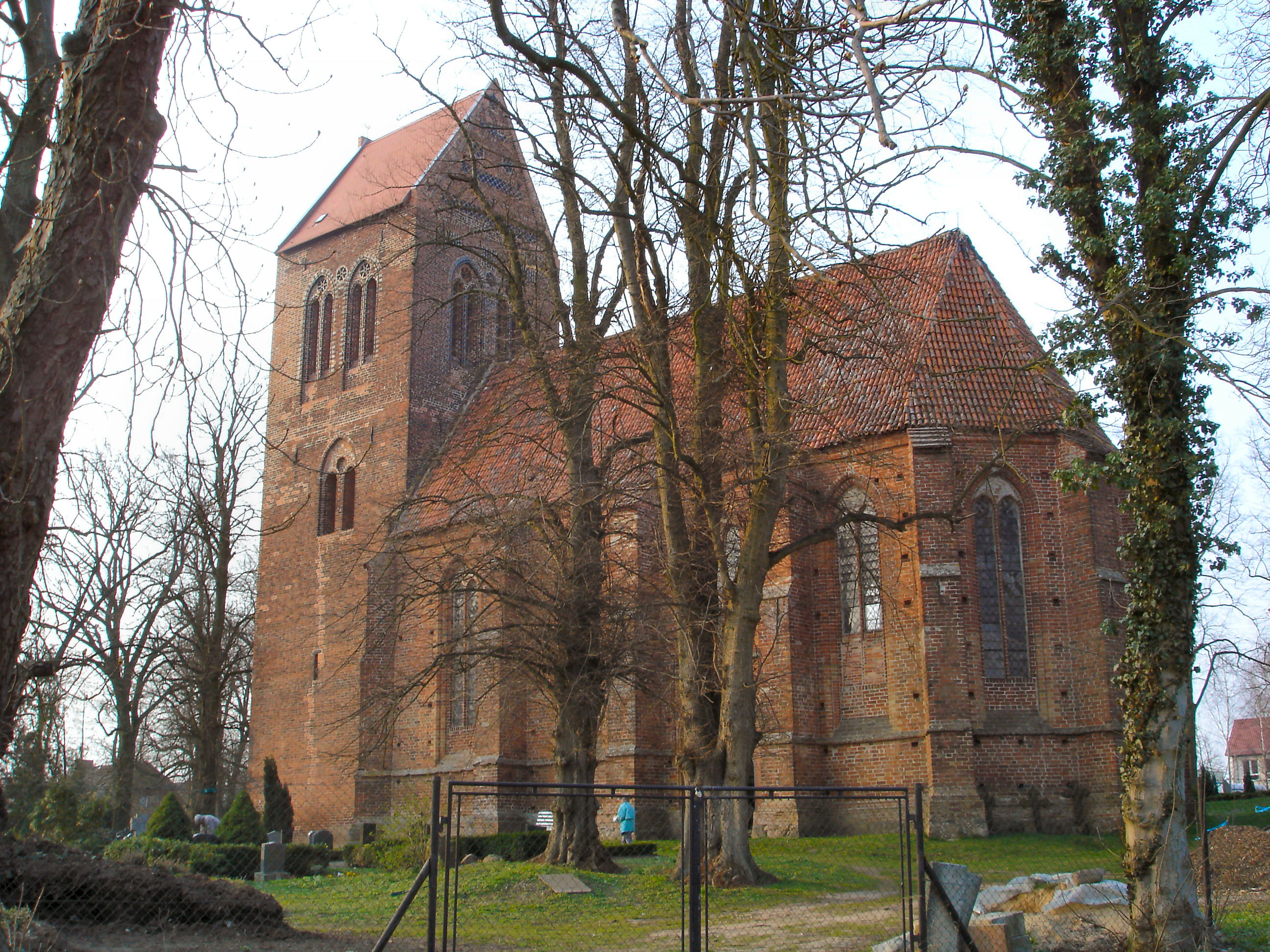
Kirche Zurow
