= Blankenberg, Mecklenburg-Vorpommern =

Blankenberg
- Municipality
- Location of Blankenberg within Ludwigslust-Parchim district
- Interactive map of Blankenberg
- Location within Germany Location within Mecklenburg-Vorpommern
- Coordinates: 53°46′N 11°43′E
- Country: Germany
- State: Mecklenburg-Vorpommern
- District: Ludwigslust-Parchim
- Municipal assoc.: Sternberger Seenlandschaft
- Subdivisions: 5

Government
  - Mayor: Peter Davids

Area
  - Total: 21.42 km^{2} (8.27 sq mi)
- Elevation: 20 m (66 ft)

Population (2025-12-31)
  - Total: 395
  - Density: 18.4/km^{2} (47.8/sq mi)
- Time zone: UTC+01:00 (CET)
  - Summer (DST): UTC+02:00 (CEST)
- Postal codes: 19412
- Dialling codes: 038483
- Vehicle registration: PCH

Blankenberg (German pronunciation: [ˈblaŋkn̩ˌbɛʁk]) is a municipality in the Ludwigslust-Parchim district, in Mecklenburg-Vorpommern, Germany.
