= Jesendorf =

- Municipality
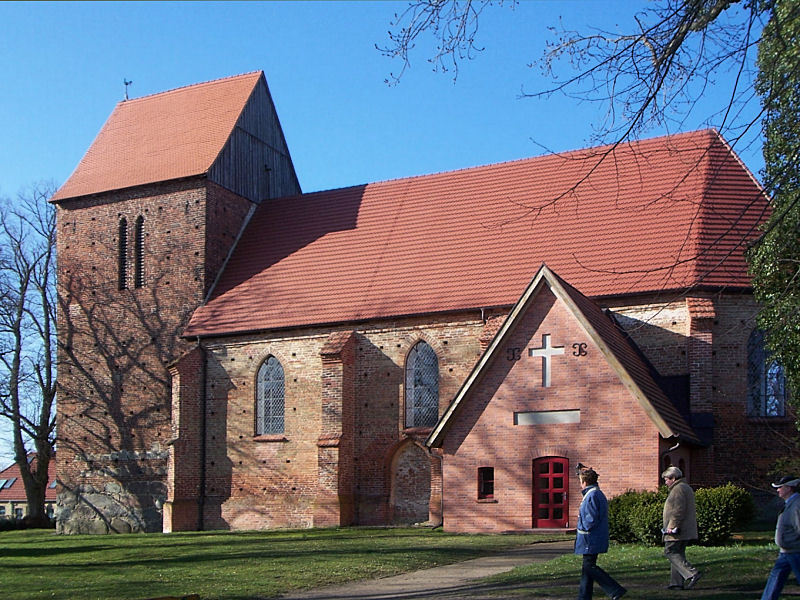
- Medieval village church in Jesendorf

- Coat of arms

- Location of Jesendorf within Nordwestmecklenburg district
- Interactive map of Jesendorf
- Location within Germany Location within Mecklenburg-Vorpommern
- Coordinates: 53°47′N 11°35′E
- Country: Germany
- State: Mecklenburg-Vorpommern
- District: Nordwestmecklenburg
- Municipal assoc.: Neukloster-Warin

Government
  - Mayor: Arne Jöhnk

Area
  - Total: 21.20 km^{2} (8.19 sq mi)
- Elevation: 32 m (105 ft)

Population (2025-12-31)
  - Total: 541
  - Density: 25.5/km^{2} (66.1/sq mi)
- Time zone: UTC+01:00 (CET)
  - Summer (DST): UTC+02:00 (CEST)
- Postal codes: 19417
- Dialling codes: 038484
- Vehicle registration: NWM
- Website: www.neukloster.de

Jesendorf is a municipality in the Nordwestmecklenburg district, in Mecklenburg-Vorpommern, Germany
