= Sternberger Seenlandschaft =

- Amt
- Map of Ludwigslust-Parchim highlighting Sternberger Seenlandschaft
- Interactive map of Sternberger Seenlandschaft
- Location within Germany Location within Mecklenburg-Vorpommern
- Coordinates: 53°42′N 11°45′E
- Country: Germany
- State: Mecklenburg-Vorpommern
- District: Ludwigslust-Parchim
- Seat: Sternberg
- Subdivisions: 12 municipalities

Area
  - Total: 392.41 km^{2} (151.51 sq mi)

Population (2025-12-31)
  - Total: 11,637
  - Density: 29.655/km^{2} (76.807/sq mi)
- Time zone: UTC+01:00 (CET)
  - Summer (DST): UTC+02:00 (CEST)
- Website: www.amt-ssl.de

Sternberger Seenlandschaft (literally: "Sternberg lakes landscape") is an Amt in the Ludwigslust-Parchim district, in Mecklenburg-Vorpommern, Germany. The seat of the Amt is in Sternberg. It includes two small towns and about 50 villages. The towns are Sternberg and Brüel, the largest village is Dabel.

The largest lakes are Keezer See, Mickowsee, Tempziner See, Großer Sternberger See, Woseriner See, Kleinpritzer See and Woseriner See.

The Amt Sternberger Seenlandschaft consists of the following 12 municipalities:

1. Blankenberg
2. Borkow
3. Brüel
4. Dabel
5. Hohen Pritz
6. Kloster Tempzin
7. Kobrow
8. Kuhlen-Wendorf
9. Mustin
10. Sternberg
11. Weitendorf
12. Witzin
