= Brüel =

Town in Mecklenburg-Vorpommern, Germany

- Town
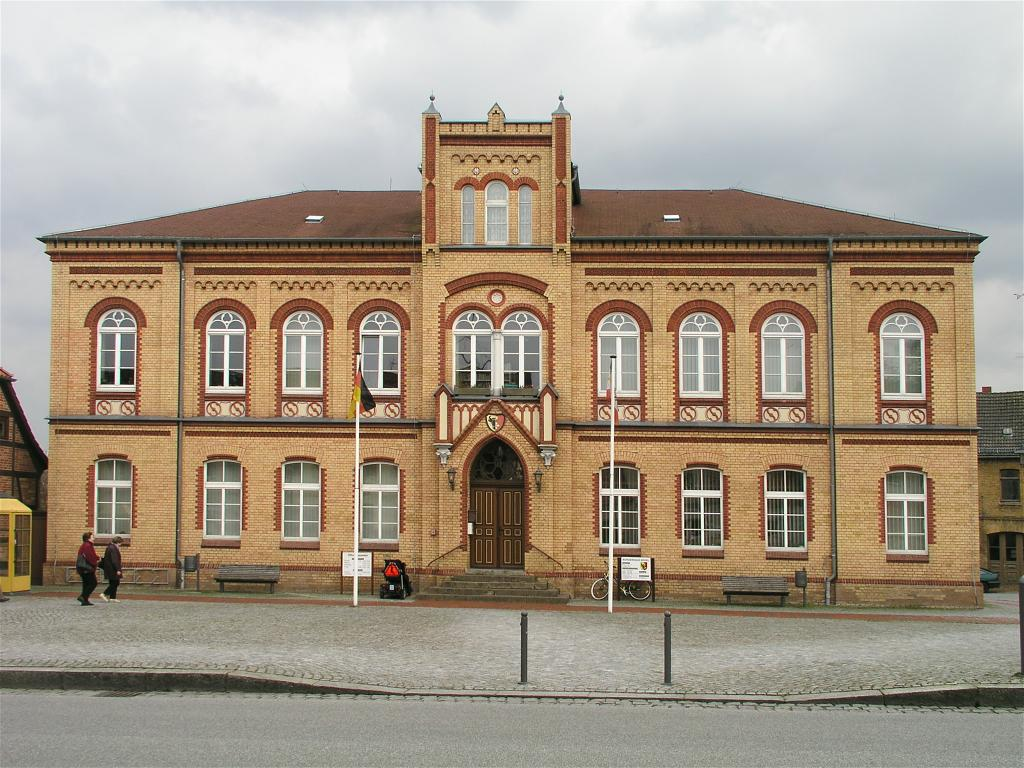
- Town hall

- Coat of arms

- Location of Brüel within Ludwigslust-Parchim district
- Interactive map of Brüel
- Location within Germany Location within Mecklenburg-Vorpommern
- Coordinates: 53°43′N 11°43′E
- Country: Germany
- State: Mecklenburg-Vorpommern
- District: Ludwigslust-Parchim
- Municipal assoc.: Sternberger Seenlandschaft
- Subdivisions: 6

Government
  - Mayor: Hans-Jürgen Goldberg

Area
  - Total: 27.21 km^{2} (10.51 sq mi)
- Elevation: 20 m (66 ft)

Population (2025-12-31)
  - Total: 2,524
  - Density: 92.76/km^{2} (240.2/sq mi)
- Time zone: UTC+01:00 (CET)
  - Summer (DST): UTC+02:00 (CEST)
- Postal codes: 19412
- Dialling codes: 038483
- Vehicle registration: PCH
- Website: www.stadt-brueel.de

Brüel (German pronunciation: [ˈbʁyːl]) is a town in the Ludwigslust-Parchim district, in Mecklenburg-Western Pomerania, Germany. It is situated 24 km northeast of Schwerin.

== Notable people ==
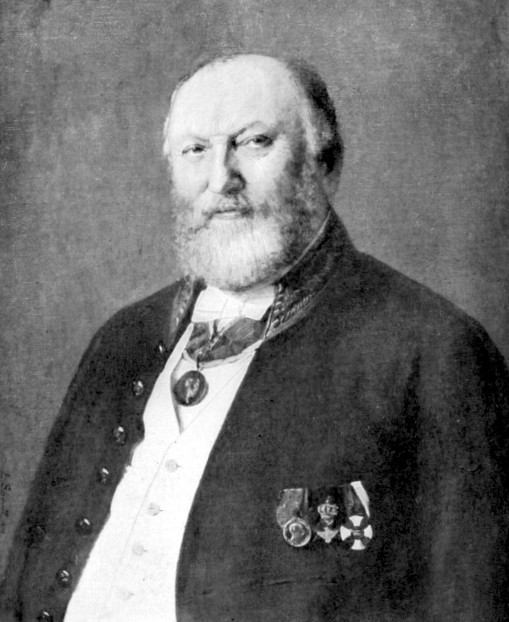
Friedrich Schlie 1898

- Johannes Schulze (1786–1869), educator and administrator
- Carl Hinstorff (1811–1882), bookseller and publisher, founder of Hinstorff Verlag
- Friedrich Schlie (1839–1902), archaeologist and art historian
- Theo Jörgensmann (1948–2025), jazz clarinetist, lived in Brüel from 1997 until his death in 2025
