= Lalendorf station =

Railway station in Germany

Lalendorf
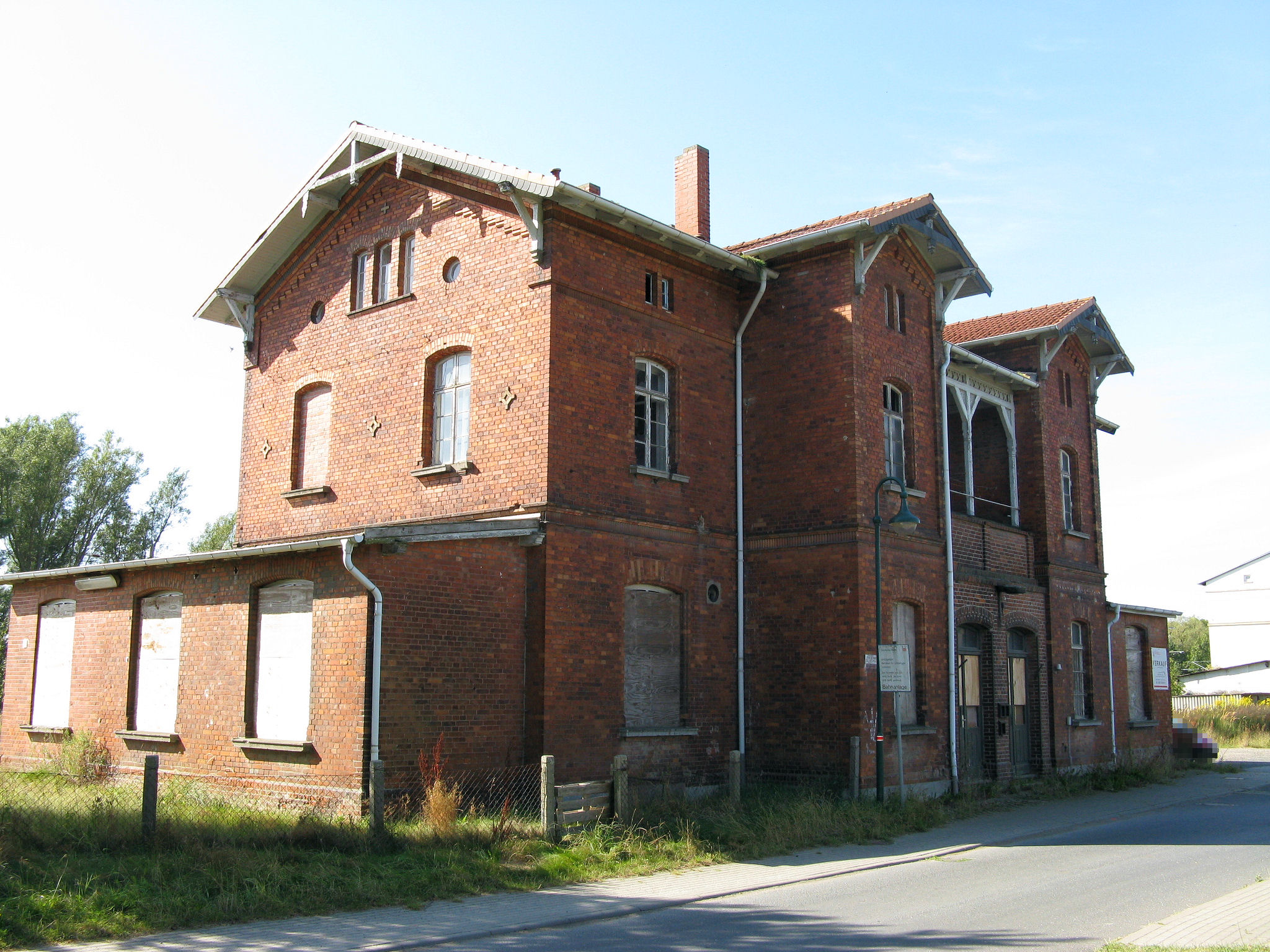
- Station building, street side

General information
- Location: Am Bahnhof 2-3, Lalendorf, Mecklenburg-Vorpommern; Germany
- Coordinates: 53°45′18″N 12°23′13″E
- Lines: Bützow–Szczecin railway; Neustrelitz–Warnemünde railway
- Platforms: 1

Construction
- Accessible: Yes

Other information
- Station code: 3496
- DS100 code: WLD
- Category: 7
- Website: www.bahnhof.de

History
- Opened: 1864 reopened 1961
- Closed: 1945 (rails demounted and requisitioned by the USSR)
- Electrified: 15 December 1985; 40 years ago

Services
Preceding station	DB Regio Nordost	Following station
Priemerburg towards Bützow	RE 4	Neu Wokern towards Szczecin Główny or Ueckermünde Stadthafen
Location
- Location within Mecklenburg-Vorpommern

Lalendorf station is located in the municipality of Lalendorf in the German state of Mecklenburg-Vorpommern. The Neustrelitz–Warnemünde railway and the railway from Bützow to Neubrandenburg cross near the station. Both lines originally had separate station facilities, both located on the same station forecourt. Since the Neustrelitz–Warnemünde railway was rebuilt in 1960/1961, it bypasses the Lalendorf station, but it is connected to it by a connecting curve. The station’s entrance building and several other buildings in the station area are heritage-listed buildings.

== Location ==
The station is located in the municipality of Lalendorf in the district of Rostock on the southern edge of the village of Lalendorf about 10 kilometres east of Güstrow and about 40 kilometres south-east of Rostock. The railway line from Bützow runs in an east–west direction, while the line from Neustrelitz to Warnemunde runs from southeast to northwest.

== History ==
Lalendorf station was opened in 1864 when the Grand Duchy of Mecklenburg Friedrich-Franz Railway (Großherzoglich Mecklenburgische Friedrich-Franz-Eisenbahn, MFFE) extended its line from Güstrow to Malchin. The line was extended in 1867 to Strasburg on the Prussian border, where it connected with Stettin (now Szczecin in Poland). The Neustrelitz–Warnemünde railway, known as the Lloyd-Bahn (Lloyd Railway), which was opened in 1886, crossed the MFFE line in Lalendorf. It had its own station north of the MFFE station. The station forecourt and its access road and the railway hotel were used by both railway companies. Both line were interconnected at the western ends of the two stations.

After the MFFE had been nationalised in 1877, the Mecklenburg parliament decided in 1890 to nationalise the Lloyd Railway. The negotiations dragged for a while, so that the line did not become part of the MFFE until 1893. After the nationalisation, the stations of both railway companies were united under a single administration. From 1893, the express trains between Rostock and Berlin ran via Güstrow between Rostock and Lalendorf, rather than via the direct route; as a result Güstrow became one of the most important nodes in the Mecklenburg railway network. In order to facilitate the transition between the two tracks, a connecting curve was built from the MFFE station towards Neustrelitz, which was known as the Berliner Kurve (Berlin curve). The Lloyd Railway's station was subsequently used as a freight yard. A connecting curve was also built from the yard to the line towards Teterow. The Lloyd Railway from Lalendorf to Rostock lost its importance and was reduced to the status of a branch line. It was not until 1930 that the Lalendorf–Rostock was upgraded and used by some express trains.

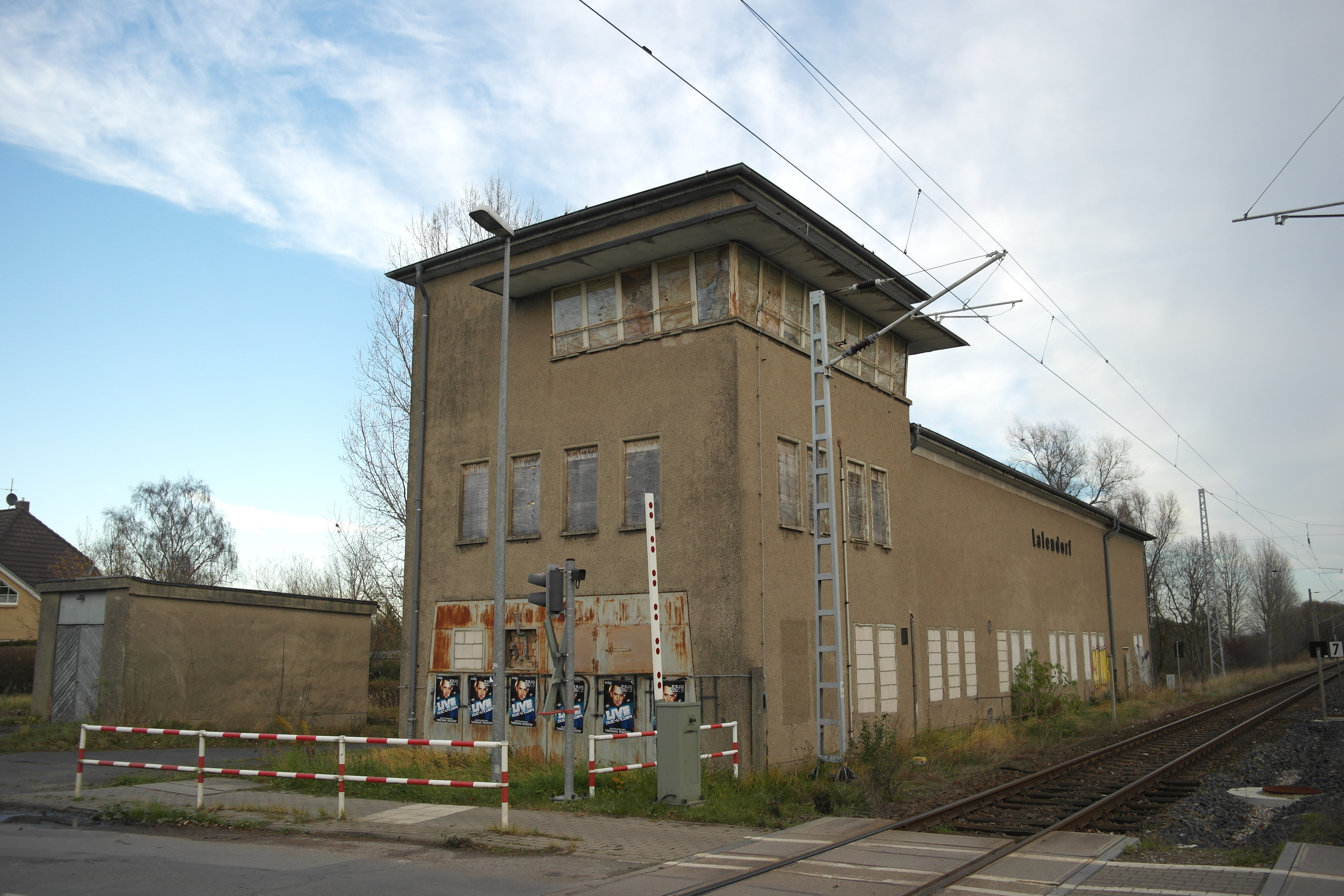
Signal box

The station was destroyed towards the end of World War II, when a stationary ammunition train was strafed and exploded. Among other things, the former station building of the Lloyd Railway and the station master’s house were destroyed. After the war, the section of the Lloyd Railway from Plaaz via Lalendorf and Waren (Müritz) to Neustrelitz was dismantled for reparations to the Soviet Union, including almost all the facilities of Lalendorf station.

A new port was built in Rostock in the late 1950s. The line from Neustrelitz to Rostock was rebuilt especially to connect with the port. As a result, it was rebuilt on a newly surveyed route with larger curve radii. While the line south of Lalendorf essentially followed the old track bed, it followed a completely new path as it passed through the Lalendorf area and further north. Lalendorf station was not touched and the line bypassed Lalendorf to the east and crossed the east–west line on a bridge. South of the intersection, the Berlin curve remained as a connection to Lalendorf station. At the connection of the Berlin curve to the line, the Lalendorf Ost operations station replaced the former Vogelsang junction. Both stations were controlled by a new relay interlocking at a new signal box built to the GS II DR design to the east of the platforms of Lalendorf station.

The part of the station formerly used by the Lloyd Railway was used after the reconstruction of the line for the parking of works trains and as a storehouse of building materials and agricultural products. The line from Neustrelitz to Rostock via Lalendorf station and Güstrow was electrified in 1984 and the direct line from Lalendorf via Plaaz to Rostock followed a few months later. A substation for railway power was built in Lalendorf with a siding near the "Berlin curve".

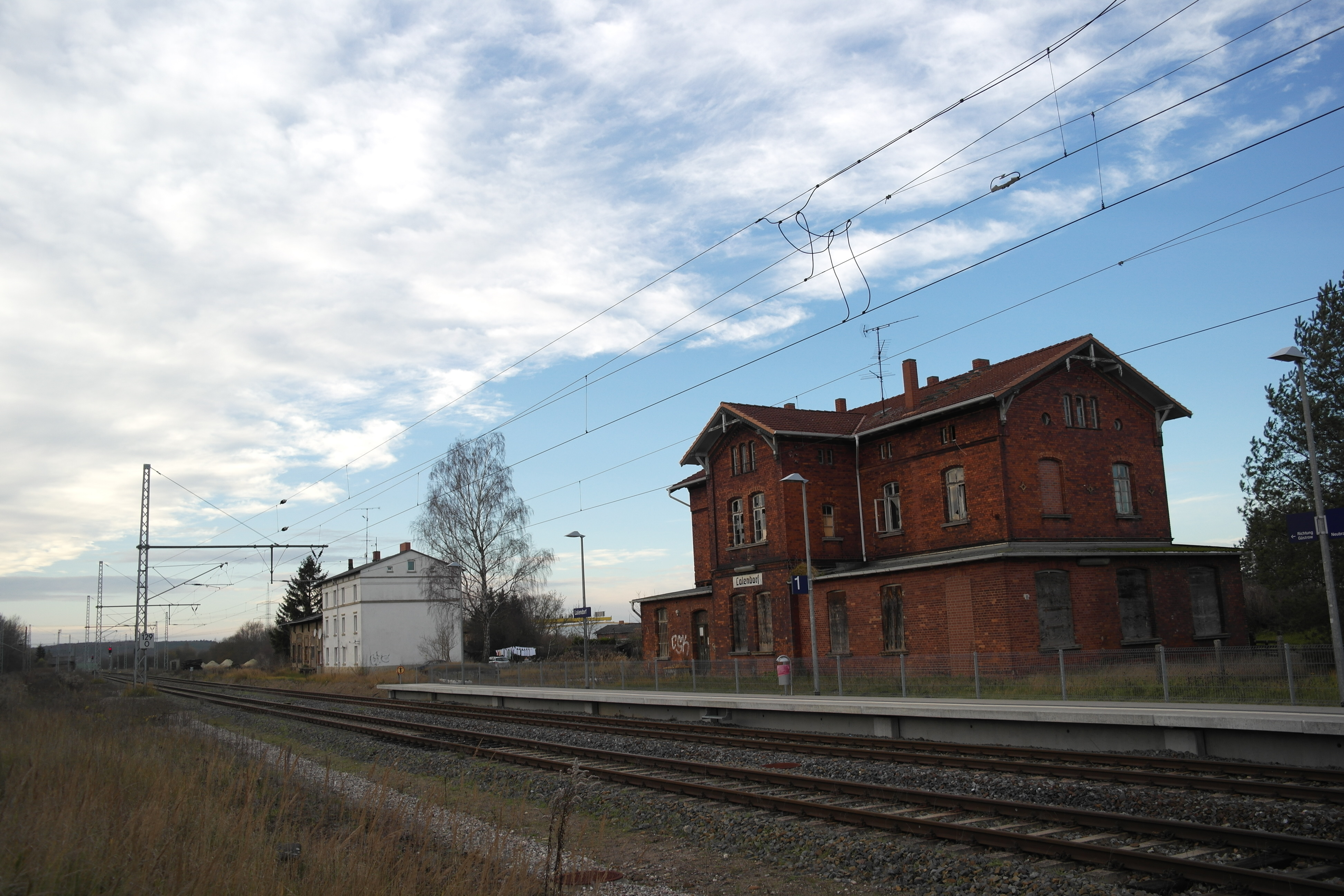
The platform, station building and railway workers' residences (behind) are under heritage protection

The station was rebuilt after 2000 and the platform tracks were reduced to one. The station was connected to an electronic interlocking.

=== Passenger services ===
In the past the station was generally served by passenger trains to and from all four directions. Express trains usually did not stop at the station and semi-fast trains (Eilzuge) only stopped occasionally. After the dismantling of the line to Plaaz in 1945, no long-distance passenger trains served Lalendorf; after the reconstruction of the line up to 1960 the station was still not served and all express trains ran through the station without stopping. The operation of regional services from Güstrow via Lalendorf towards Waren (Müritz) ended in 1996. After that the only long-distance services in the area were InterRegio services on the route between Rostock and Berlin via Güstrow; these were later replaced by Regional-Express services. These services have not normally stopped in Lalendorf.

Today line RE6 runs from Lübeck via Bad Kleinen, Bützow, Güstrow, Neubrandenburg, Pasewalk to Szczecin and an Ostseeland-Verkehrs service runs from Bützow via Güstrow, Neubrandenburg, Pasewalk to Ueckermünde. Both services stop every two hours at the station and together provide an approximate hourly service. The RE 5 from Rostock via Güstrow to Berlin passes through the station, but generally does not stop.

Line	Route	Frequency
RE 4	Lübeck – Bad Kleinen – Bützow – Güstrow – Lalendorf – Pasewalk – Szczecin	Hourly

== Infrastructure ==
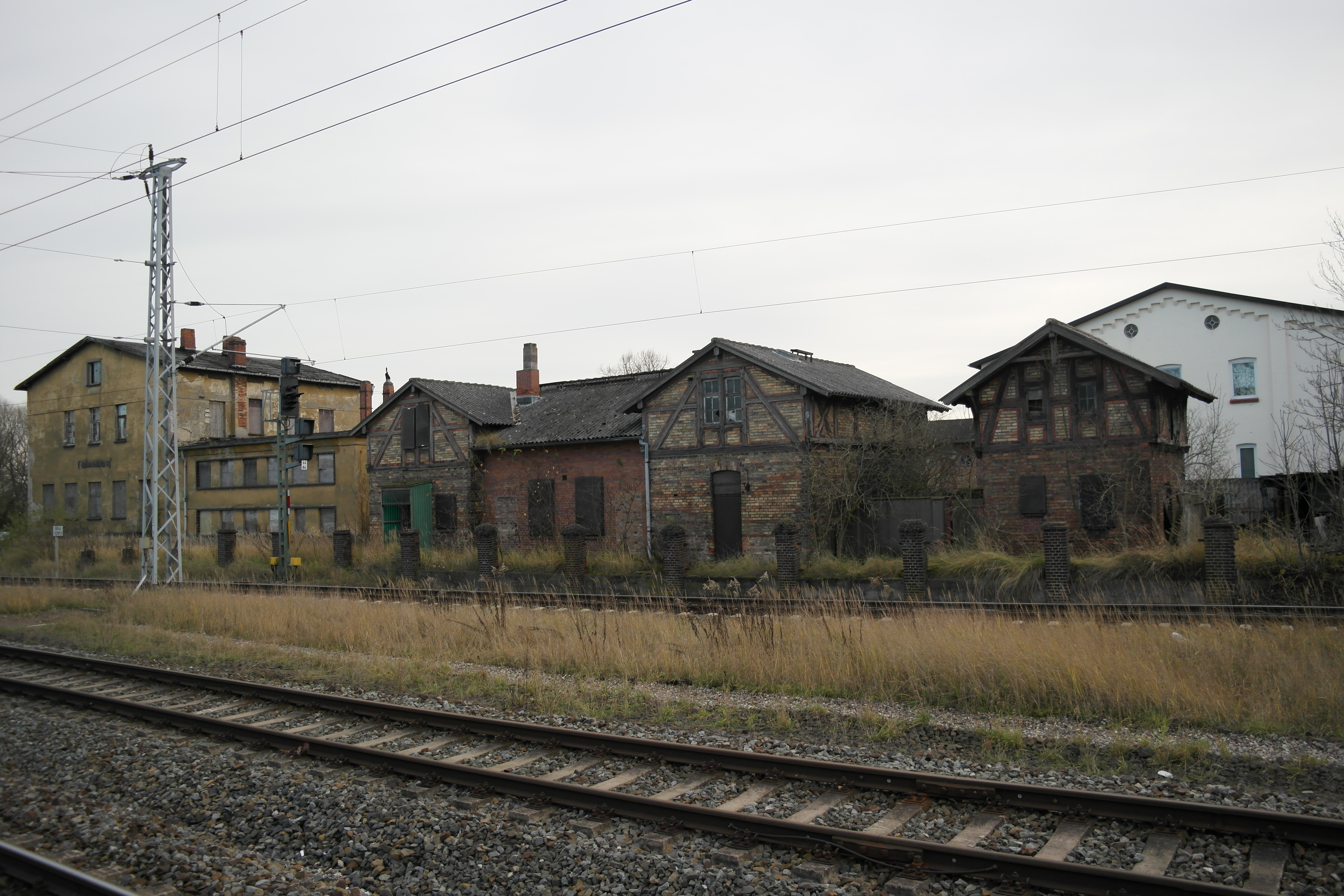
Outbuilding

The station building is located north of the tracks and is empty (status: late 2012). Three tracks are still in operation, only one of which has a platform. In the eastern station area is a guarded level crossing. In this area, a curve connects towards Waren and a siding branches off to a substation. A signal box that is now disused was built in the area in the late 1960s; the original signal box in the western part of the railway station was demolished around 1970.

The tracks and station building of the Lloyd Railway, later used as the freight yard, lie north of the tracks of the east–west line and at an acute angle to it. After the Second World War, this part was no longer operated as part of the station and controlled with signals, but, sidings were used for supplying building material and for parking rolling stock; some of the sidings still exist. The station building of the Lloyd Railway no longer exists, but there are some outbuildings in this area and a water tower that dates from the period after the First World War.

The station forecourt and approach road were shared by the two railway companies. The route from the old route from Lalendorf to Plaaz, which operated up to 1945, has been preserved, and a track runs on most of it today.

The station building of the MFFE, two houses for officials, the avenue to the station and an administration building are protected as monuments.
