= Jatznick station =

Railway station in Germany

Jatznick
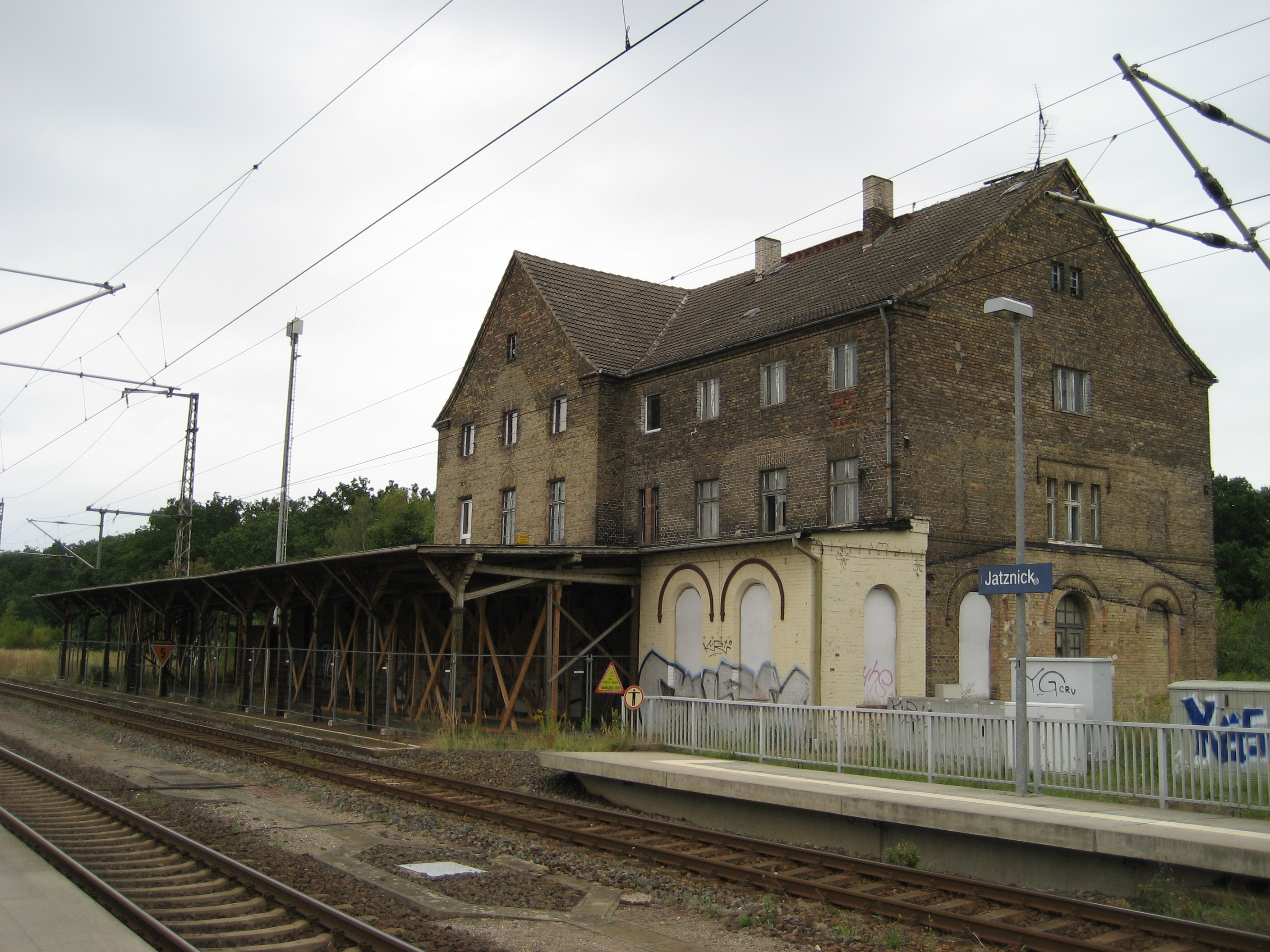
- Jatznick station

General information
- Location: Jatznick, MV, Germany
- Owner: Deutsche Bahn
- Operator: DB Netz; DB Station&Service
- Lines: Angermünde–Stralsund railway Jatznick–Ueckermünde railway line
- Platforms: 2
- Tracks: 2

Construction
- Accessible: yes

Other information
- Website: www.bahnhof.de

History
- Opened: 16 March 1863; 163 years ago
- Electrified: 23 September 1988; 37 years ago

Services
Preceding station	DB Regio Nordost	Following station
Ferdinandshof towards Stralsund Hbf	RE 3	Pasewalk towards Jüterbog or Lutherstadt Wittenberg Hbf
Sandförde towards Bützow	RE 4	Torgelow towards Ueckermünde Stadthafen
Ferdinandshof towards Stralsund Hbf	RE 30	Pasewalk towards Angermünde
Location

Jatznick (German: Bahnhof Jatznick) is a railway station in the village of Jatznick, Mecklenburg-Vorpommern, Germany. The station lies of the Angermünde–Stralsund railway and the Jatznick–Ueckermünde railway line and the train services are operated by Deutsche Bahn and Ostdeutsche Eisenbahn. The station was modernised in the 2000s with new platforms and other facilities.

== Rail services ==
In the 2026 timetable the following lines stop at the station:

Line	Route	Frequency
RE 3	Stralsund – Greifswald – Jatznick – Eberswalde – Berlin – Ludwigsfelde – Jüterbog	120 min
RE 4	Lübeck – Bad Kleinen – Güstrow – Neubrandenburg – Jatznick – Löcknitz – Szczecin Glowny	120 min
RE 4	(Bützow –) Pasewalk – Jatznick– Torgelow – Ueckermünde – Ueckermünde Stadthafen	120 min
RE 30	Stralsund – Greifswald – Jatznick – Pasewalk – Prenzlau – Angermünde	120 min
