= Eggesin station =

Railway station in Germany

Eggesin

General information
- Location: Am Bahnhof 2; 17367 Eggesin, MV; Germany
- Coordinates: 53°40′53″N 14°04′22″E
- Owner: DB Netz
- Operator: DB Station&Service
- Line: Jatznick–Ueckermünde railway line
- Platforms: 1
- Tracks: 1
- Train operators: DB Regio Nordost

Other information
- Station code: 1476
- DS100 code: WEGS
- IBNR: 8011456
- Category: 7
- Website: www.bahnhof.de

Services
Preceding station	DB Regio Nordost	Following station
Torgelow towards Bützow	RE 4	Ueckermünde towards Ueckermünde Stadthafen
Location

Eggesin (German: Bahnhof Eggesin) is a railway station in the town of Eggesin, Mecklenburg-Vorpommern, Germany. The station lies on the Jatznick–Ueckermünde railway line and the train services are operated by DB Regio Nordost.

== Services ==
As of the December 2024 timetable change, the following services stop at Eggesin:

- DB Regio Nordost: Service between Ueckermünde Stadthafen and Pasewalk, with some trains continuing to Bützow.
