= Torgelow station =

Railway station in Germany

Torgelow

General information
- Location: Torgelow, MV, Germany
- Coordinates: 53°38′05″N 14°00′34″E
- Line: Jatznick–Ueckermünde railway line
- Platforms: 2
- Tracks: 2

History
- Opened: 20 April 1884; 142 years ago

Services
Preceding station	DB Regio Nordost	Following station
Jatznick towards Bützow	RE 4	Eggesin towards Ueckermünde Stadthafen
Location

Torgelow (German: Bahnhof Torgelow) is a railway station in the town of Torgelow, Mecklenburg-Vorpommern, Germany. The station lies on the Jatznick–Ueckermünde railway line and the train services are operated by DB Regio Nordost.

== Services ==
As of the December 2024 timetable change, the following services stop at Torgelow:

- DB Regio Nordost: Service between Ueckermünde Stadthafen and Pasewalk, with some trains continuing to Bützow.
