= Sandförde station =

Railway station in Sandförde

Sandförde

General information
- Location: Sandförde, MV, Germany
- Coordinates: 53.5643°N 13.9711°E
- Owner: Deutsche Bahn
- Operator: DB Netz; DB Station&Service
- Line: Angermünde–Stralsund railway
- Platforms: 2
- Tracks: 2

History
- Opened: 1892
- Electrified: 23 September 1988; 37 years ago

Services
Preceding station	DB Regio Nordost	Following station
Pasewalk towards Bützow	RE 4	Jatznick towards Ueckermünde Stadthafen
Location

Sandförde (German: Bahnhof Sandförde) is a railway station in the village of Sandförde, Mecklenburg-Vorpommern, Germany. The station lies on the Angermünde–Stralsund railway and the train services are operated by DB Regio Nordost.

== Services ==
As of the December 2024 timetable change, the following services stop at Sandförde:

- DB Regio Nordost: Service between Ueckermünde Stadthafen and Pasewalk, with some trains continuing to Bützow.
