= Blumenhagen station =

Railway station in Mecklenburg-Vorpommern, Germany

Blumenhagen
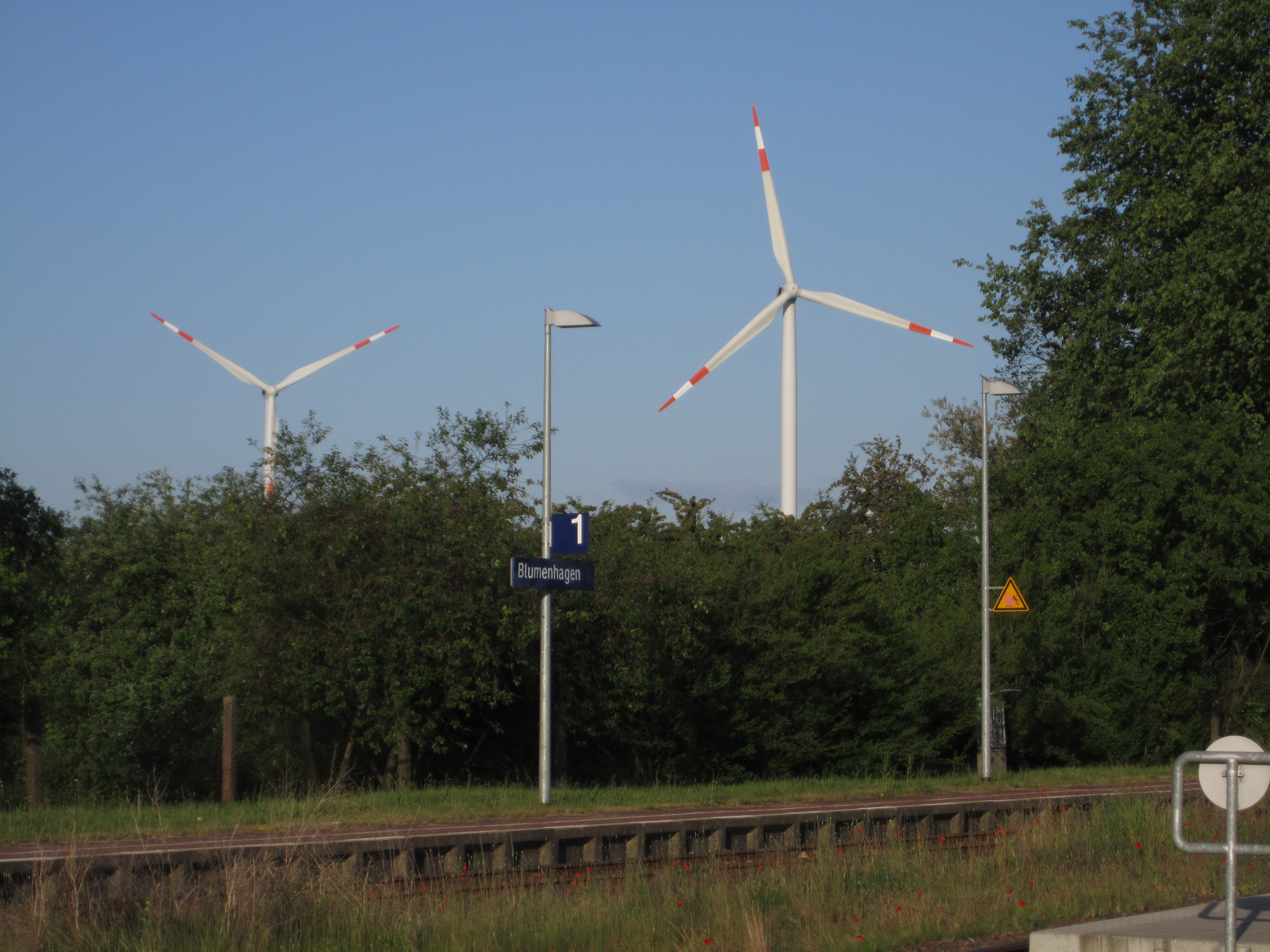
- 2012

General information
- Location: Wilsickower Strasse 125; 17337 Blumenhagen; Mecklenburg-Vorpommern; Germany
- Coordinates: 53°31′42″N 13°52′18″E
- Owner: Deutsche Bahn
- Operator: DB Station&Service
- Lines: Bützow–Szczecin railway (KBS 175)
- Platforms: 2 side platforms
- Tracks: 2
- Train operators: DB Regio Nordost
- Connections: RE 4

Construction
- Parking: yes
- Cycle facilities: yes
- Accessible: yes

Other information
- Station code: 713
- DS100 code: WBLK
- IBNR: 8011213
- Category: 6
- Website: www.bahnhof.de

Services
Preceding station	DB Regio Nordost	Following station
Strasburg (Uckerm) towards Bützow	RE 4	Pasewalk towards Szczecin Główny or Ueckermünde Stadthafen
Strasburg (Uckerm) towards Bützow	RE 4	Pasewalk towards Ueckermünde Stadthafen
Location
- Location within Mecklenburg-Vorpommern Location within Germany Location within Europe

Blumenhagen station (German: Bahnhof Blumenhagen) is a railway station in the municipality of Blumenhagen, located in the Vorpommern-Greifswald district in Mecklenburg-Vorpommern, Germany.
