= Ferdinandshof station =

Railway station in Germany

Ferdinandshof

General information
- Location: Ferdinandshof, Mecklenburg-Vorpommern, Germany
- Coordinates: 53°39′34″N 13°52′58″E
- Line: Angermünde–Stralsund railway
- Platforms: 2
- Tracks: 2

Construction
- Accessible: yes

Other information
- Website: www.bahnhof.de

History
- Opened: 16 March 1863; 163 years ago
- Electrified: 23 September 1988; 37 years ago

Services
Preceding station	DB Regio Nordost	Following station
Ducherow towards Stralsund Hbf	RE 3	Jatznick towards Jüterbog or Lutherstadt Wittenberg Hbf
Ducherow towards Stralsund Hbf	RE 30	Jatznick towards Angermünde
Location
- Location within Mecklenburg-Vorpommern Location within Germany Location within Europe

Ferdinandshof (German: Bahnhof Ferdinandshof) is a railway station in the town of Ferdinandshof, Mecklenburg-Vorpommern, Germany. The station lies of the Angermünde–Stralsund railway and the train services are operated by Deutsche Bahn.

In the 2026 timetable the following lines stop at the station:

Line	Route	Frequency
RE 3	Stralsund – Greifswald – Ferdinandshof – Angermünde – Eberswalde – Berlin – Ludwigsfelde – Jüterbog	120 min
RE 30	Stralsund – Greifswald – Ferdinandshof – Pasewalk – Prenzlau – Angermünde	120 min
