= Schwaan station =

Railway station in Germany

Schwaan
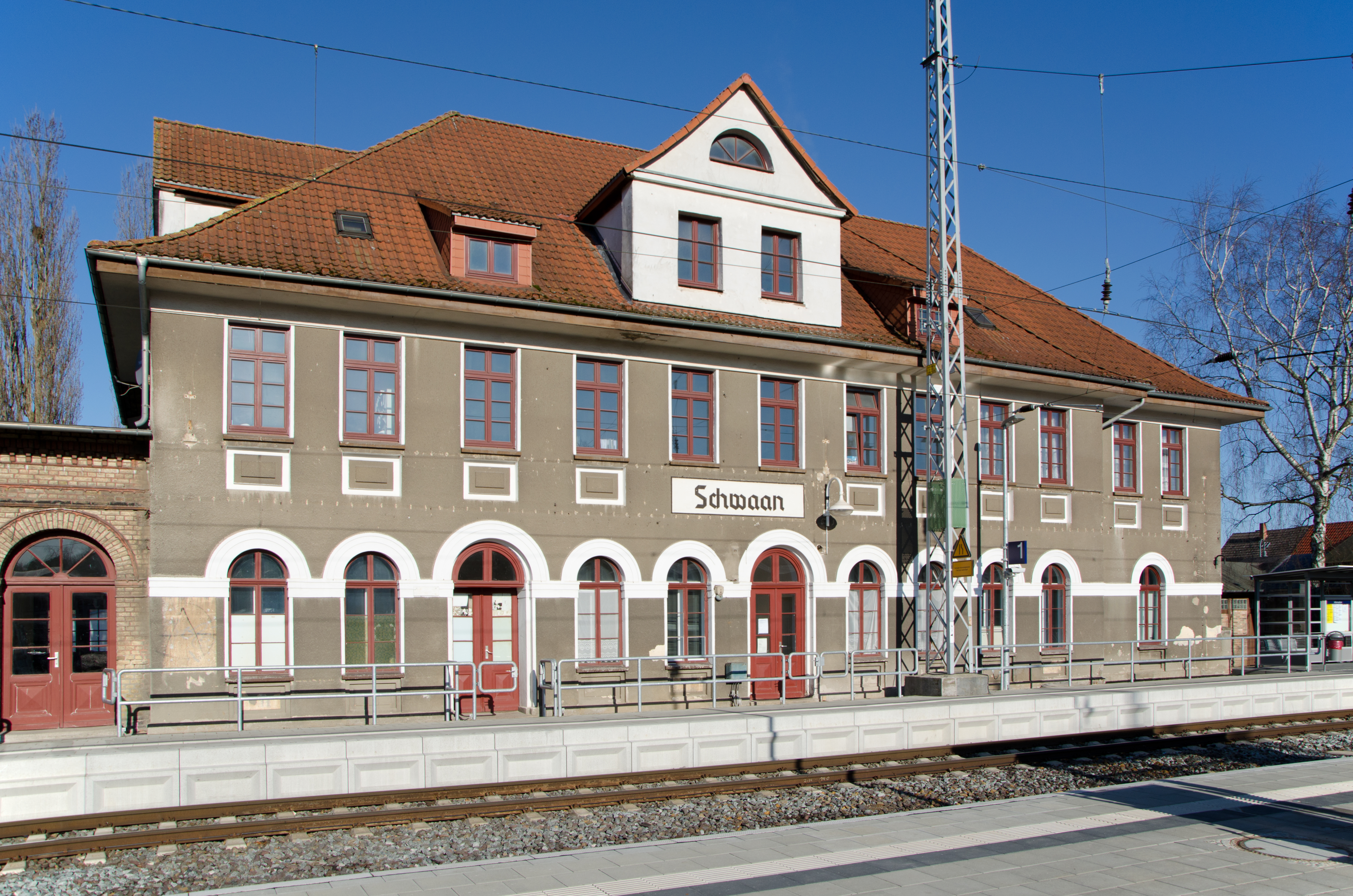
- 2012

General information
- Location: Bahnhof; 18258 Schwaan; Mecklenburg-Vorpommern; Germany
- Coordinates: 53.9393°N 12.1178°E
- Owner: DB Netz
- Operator: DB Station&Service
- Lines: Bad Kleinen–Rostock railway (KBS 100); Güstrow–Schwaan railway (KBS 182)
- Platforms: 1 island platform 1 side platform
- Tracks: 4
- Train operators: DB Regio Nordost; S-Bahn Rostock
- Connections: RE 1; RB 28; S2

Construction
- Parking: yes
- Cycle facilities: yes
- Accessible: yes

Other information
- Station code: 5695
- DS100 code: WSN
- IBNR: 8010322
- Category: 5
- Website: www.bahnhof.de

History
- Opened: 13 May 1850; 176 years ago
- Electrified: 12 April 1986; 40 years ago

Services
| Preceding station | DB Regio Nordost | Following station |
|---|---|---|
| Bützow towards Hamburg Hbf | RE 1 | Rostock Hbf Terminus |
| Bützow towards Ludwigslust | RB 28 | Rostock Hbf Terminus |
| Preceding station | Rostock S-Bahn | Following station |
| Huckstorf towards Warnemünde | S2 | Mistorf towards Güstrow |
Location
- Location within Mecklenburg-Vorpommern Location within Germany Location within Europe

Schwaan station is a railway station in the municipality of Schwaan, located in the Rostock district in Mecklenburg-Vorpommern, Germany.
