= Lido (Ueckermünde) =

Building in Ueckermunde, Germany

Coordinates: 53.7481792°N 14.0713271°E

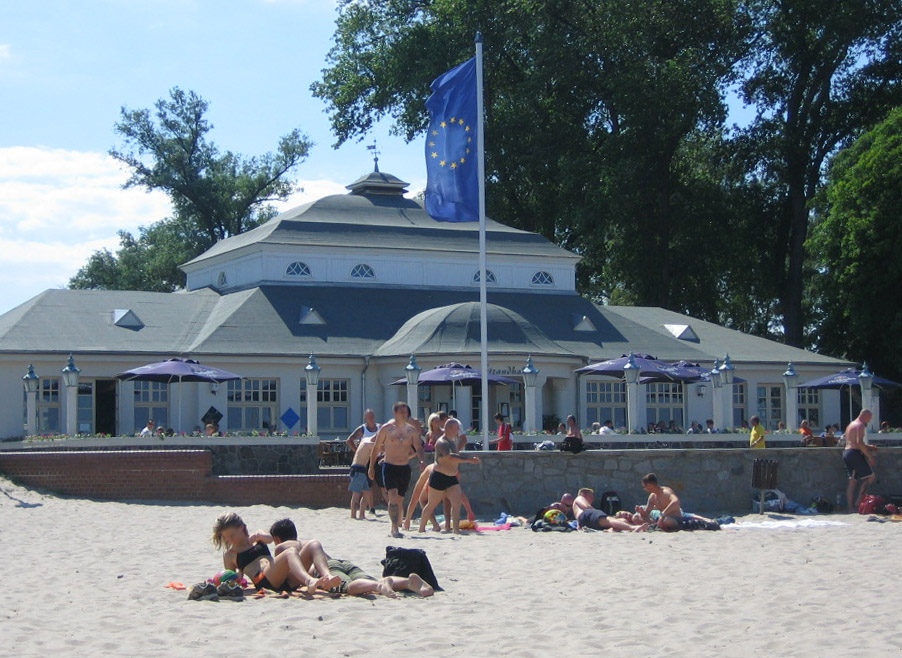
Lido in Ueckermünde

The Strandhalle is a listed building in Ueckermünde which is used as a restaurant.

== History ==
The beach pool was built in 1926 by swim club Ueckermünde. In 1938, a terrace was added. In DDR times it was a HO-run self-service restaurant, and in 1990 it was acquired by the Treuhand. In 1994 it was transferred back to the city Ueckermünde and leased to the Radeberger brewery. The beach facility was operated until 2000 as a restaurant and had to be closed because of water damage and general structural defects. In 2004, it was sold to a private investor.

The Strandhalle was renovated and has now a total floor space of about 1001 m^{2}, split into a restaurant, a terrace, a large and a smaller hall.
