= Blumenhagen =

- Ortsteil of Jatznick
- Interactive map of Blumenhagen
- Location within Germany Location within Mecklenburg-Vorpommern
- Coordinates: 53°31′N 13°52′E
- Country: Germany
- State: Mecklenburg-Vorpommern
- District: Vorpommern-Greifswald
- Municipality: Jatznick

Area
  - Total: 9.29 km^{2} (3.59 sq mi)
- Elevation: 40 m (130 ft)

Population (2011-12-31)
  - Total: 362
  - Density: 39.0/km^{2} (101/sq mi)
- Time zone: UTC+01:00 (CET)
  - Summer (DST): UTC+02:00 (CEST)
- Postal codes: 17337
- Dialling codes: 039753
- Vehicle registration: VG

Blumenhagen is a village and a former municipality in the Vorpommern-Greifswald district, in Mecklenburg-Vorpommern, Germany. Since 1 January 2012, it is part of the municipality Jatznick.
