= Eggesin =

Town in Mecklenburg-Vorpommern, Germany

- Town
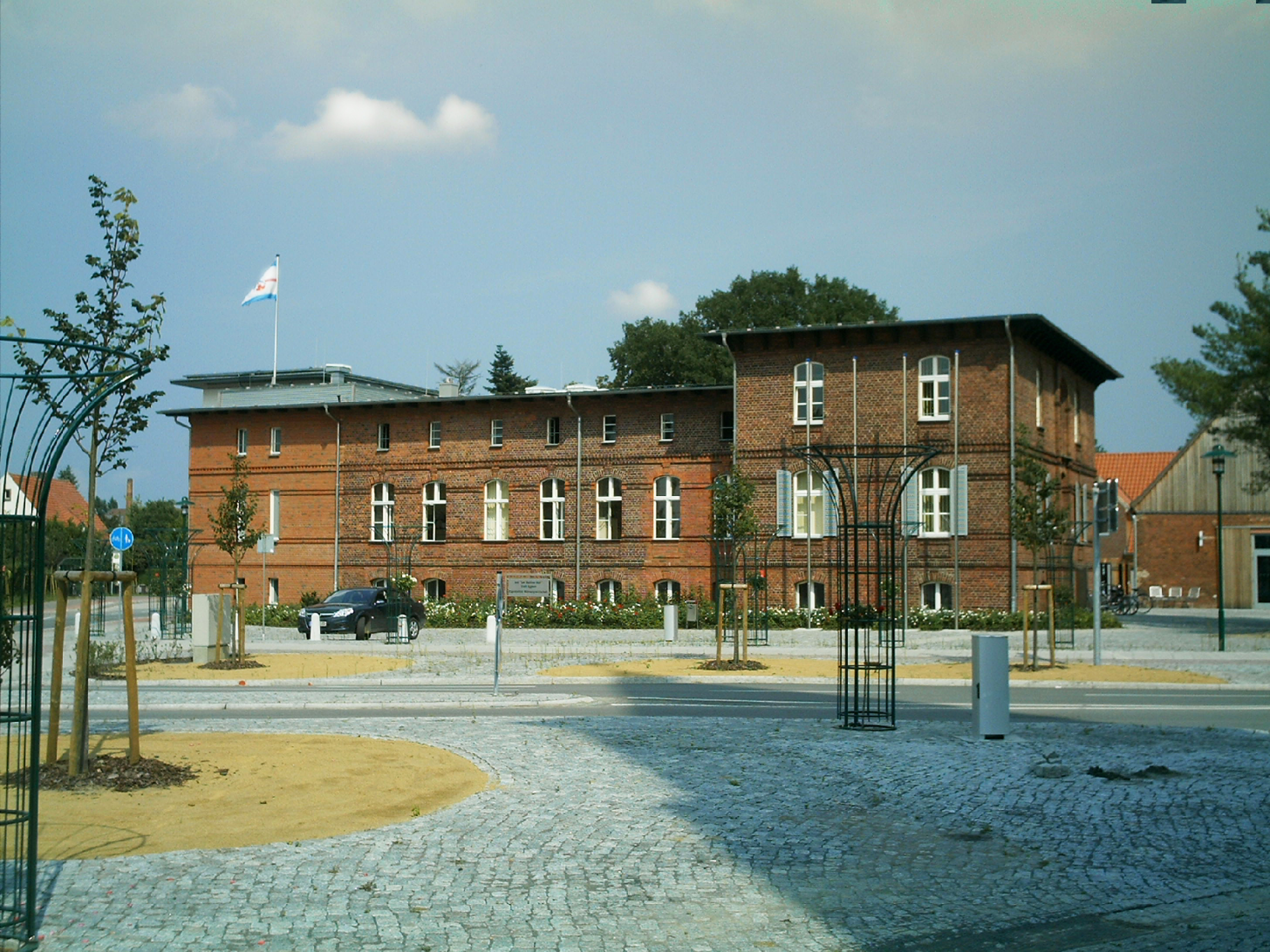
- Town hall

- Flag Coat of arms

- Location of Eggesin within Vorpommern-Greifswald district
- Interactive map of Eggesin
- Location within Germany Location within Mecklenburg-Vorpommern
- Coordinates: 53°41′N 14°05′E
- Country: Germany
- State: Mecklenburg-Vorpommern
- District: Vorpommern-Greifswald
- Municipal assoc.: Am Stettiner Haff

Government
  - Mayor: Bianka Schwibbe

Area
  - Total: 88.23 km^{2} (34.07 sq mi)
- Elevation: 8 m (26 ft)

Population (2025-12-31)
  - Total: 4,724
  - Density: 53.54/km^{2} (138.7/sq mi)
- Time zone: UTC+01:00 (CET)
  - Summer (DST): UTC+02:00 (CEST)
- Postal codes: 17367
- Dialling codes: 039779
- Vehicle registration: VG
- Website: www.eggesin.de

Eggesin (German pronunciation: [ˈɛɡəziːn]) is a municipality in the Vorpommern-Greifswald district, in Mecklenburg-Western Pomerania, Germany. It is situated on the river Uecker, 7 km southeast of Ueckermünde, and 42 km northwest of Szczecin.

== History ==
From 1648 to 1720, Eggesin was part of Swedish Pomerania. From 1720 to 1945, it was part of the Prussian Province of Pomerania, from 1945 to 1952 of the State of Mecklenburg-Vorpommern, from 1952 to 1990 of the Bezirk Neubrandenburg of East Germany and since 1990 again of Mecklenburg-Vorpommern.

== Transport ==
- Eggesin railway station is served by local services to Neubrandenburg, Pasewalk and Ueckermünde.

== Towns near Eggesin ==
- Szczecin (Poland)
- Ueckermünde (Germany)
- Pasewalk (Germany)
- Strasburg, Germany
- Nowe Warpno (Poland)
- Police (Poland)

== Personalities ==
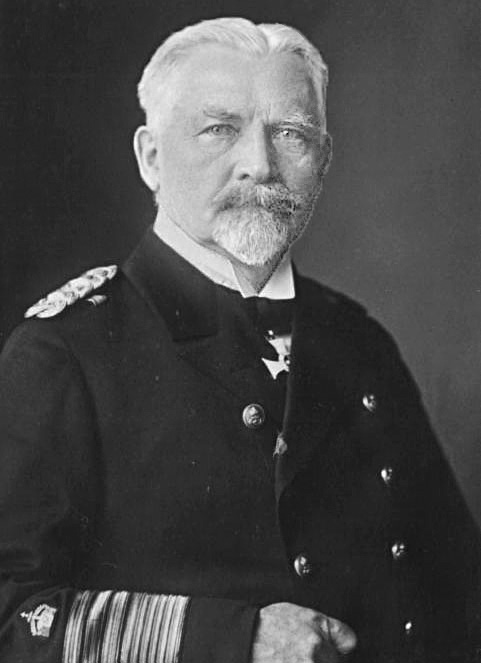
Ludwig von Schröder

- Ludwig von Schröder (1854–1933), Prussian admiral
- Egbert Swensson (born 1956), sail sportsman
