= Jatznick =

- Municipality
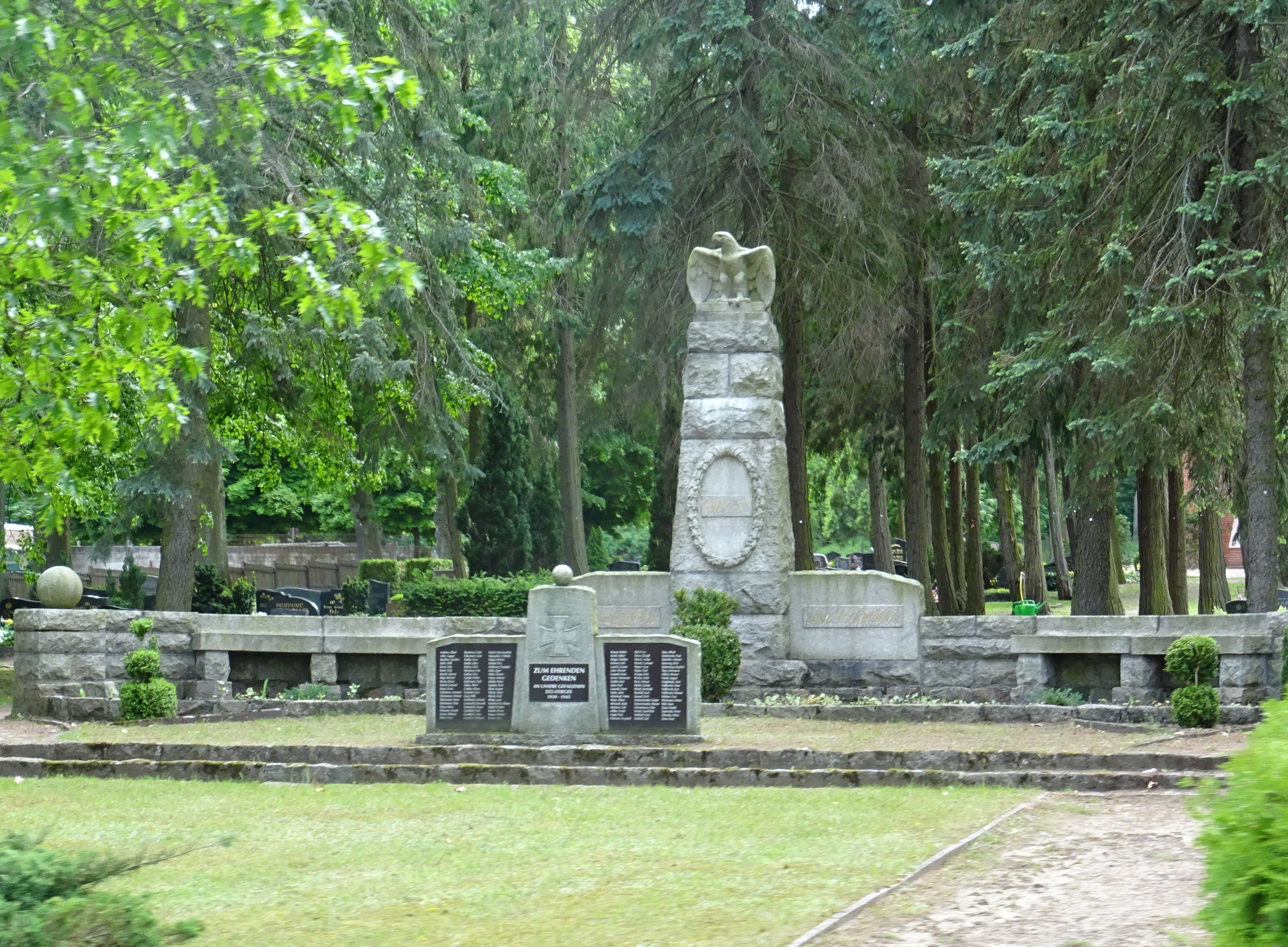
- War memorial in Jatznick

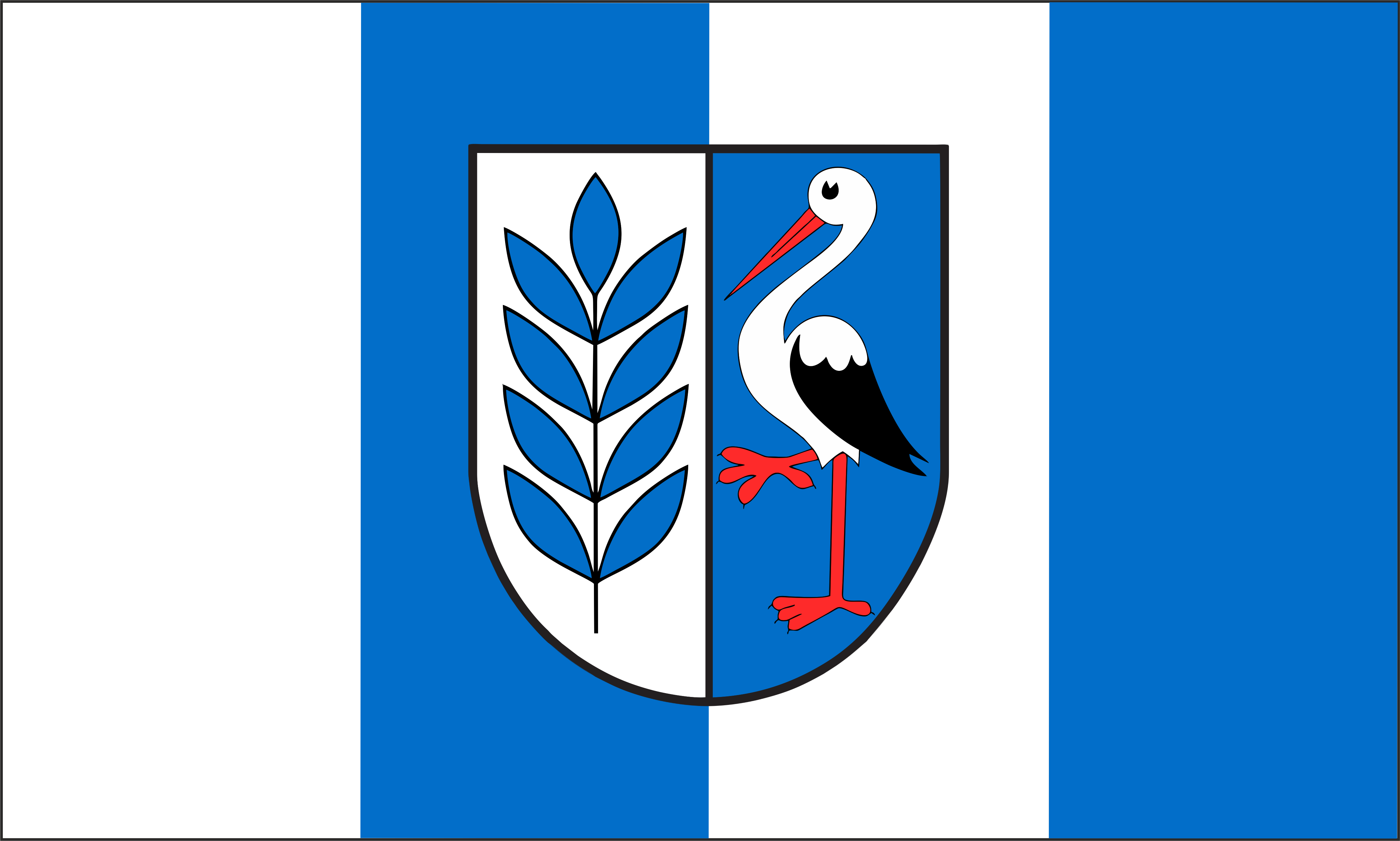
- Flag Coat of arms

- Location of Jatznick within Vorpommern-Greifswald district
- Interactive map of Jatznick
- Location within Germany Location within Mecklenburg-Vorpommern
- Coordinates: 53°35′N 13°56′E
- Country: Germany
- State: Mecklenburg-Vorpommern
- District: Vorpommern-Greifswald
- Municipal assoc.: Uecker-Randow-Tal

Government
  - Mayor: Frank Schulz

Area
  - Total: 62.03 km^{2} (23.95 sq mi)
- Elevation: 22 m (72 ft)

Population (2025-12-31)
  - Total: 2,118
  - Density: 34.14/km^{2} (88.43/sq mi)
- Time zone: UTC+01:00 (CET)
  - Summer (DST): UTC+02:00 (CEST)
- Postal codes: 17309
- Dialling codes: 039741
- Vehicle registration: VG
- Website: https://www.pasewalk.de/amt-uer-tal/jatznick/

Jatznick is a municipality in the Vorpommern-Greifswald district, in Mecklenburg-Vorpommern in north-eastern Germany.

== Geography ==
With almost 2,000 inhabitants, Jatznick is the largest municipality in the Uecker-Randow-Tal district. It is situated on the north-eastern edge of the Nördliche Höhenrücken, a terminal moraine that extends about 25 kilometres to the west (highest elevation in the Brohmer Berge 153 metres above sea level). North and east of Jatznick, the landscape becomes very flat (Ueckermünde Heath to the Szczecin Lagoon as well as the lowlands of the Friedländer Große Wiese). At Waldeshöhe there is the Aalsee, a water body of about 0.8 hectares.

=== Districts ===
- Am Bahnhof
- Blumenhagen
- Belling
- Groß Spiegelberg
- Klein Luckow
- Sandförde with Wilhelmsthal
- Waldeshöhe

== History ==
1354 the village Jatznick is mentioned for the first time in a document. The place was originally inhabited by Slavs, who gave the place its present name.

From 1648 to 1720, Jatznick was part of Swedish Pomerania. From 1720 to 1945, it was part of the Prussian Province of Pomerania, from 1945 to 1952 of the State of Mecklenburg-Vorpommern, from 1952 to 1990 of the Bezirk Neubrandenburg of East Germany and since 1990 again of Mecklenburg-Vorpommern.

On 1 July 1950 the until then independent community of Waldeshöhe was incorporated. On 1 January 2001 the former municipality of Belling was incorporated. On 1 January 2012 the formerly independent communities of Blumenhagen and Klein Luckow were incorporated into Jatznick.

== Transport ==
Jatznick railway station connects the area with Stralsund, Greifswald, Züssow, Angermünde, Eberswalde, Berlin, Ueckermünde and Neubrandenburg.
