= Ueckermünde station =

Railway station in Mecklenburg-Vorpommern, Germany

Ueckermünde
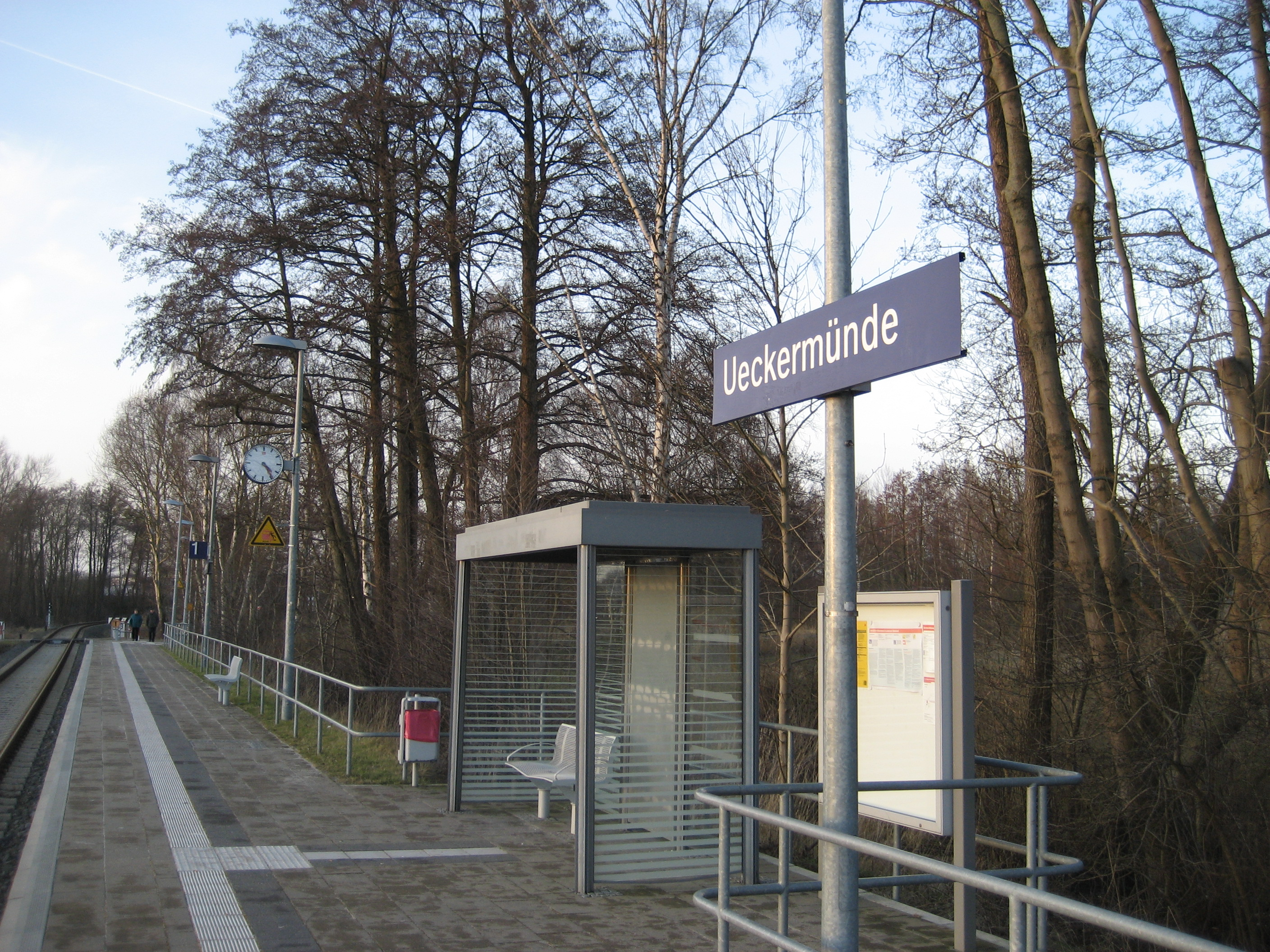
- Ueckermünde railway station

General information
- Location: Ueckermünde, MV, Germany
- Coordinates: 53°43′44″N 14°03′32″E
- Line: Jatznick–Ueckermünde railway line
- Distance: 163.0 kilometres (101.3 mi) from Berlin Nordbahnhof
- Platforms: 1
- Tracks: 1

History
- Opened: 15 August 2009; 17 years ago

Services
Preceding station	DB Regio Nordost	Following station
Eggesin towards Bützow	RE 4	Ueckermünde Stadthafen Terminus
Location

Ueckermünde station (German: Bahnhof Ueckermünde) is a railway station in the town of Ueckermünde, Mecklenburg-Vorpommern, Germany. The station lies on the Jatznick–Ueckermünde railway line and the train services are operated by DB Regio Nordost. The current station opened on 15 August 2009, as part of the northern extension of the line into Ueckermünde.

== Services ==
As of the December 2024 timetable change, the following services stop at Ueckermünde:

- DB Regio Nordost: Service between Ueckermünde Stadthafen and Pasewalk, with some trains continuing to Bützow.
