= Neubrandenburg station =

Railway station in Germany

Neubrandenburg
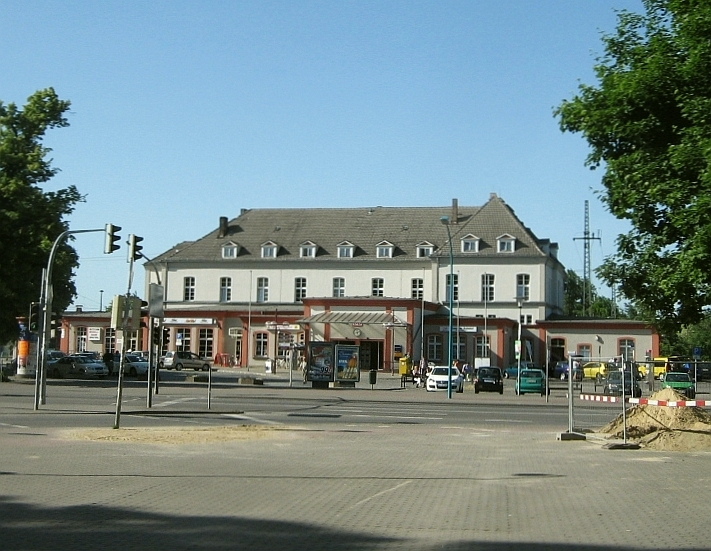
- 2008

General information
- Location: Am Bahnhof 5; 17033 Neubrandenburg; Mecklenburg-Vorpommern; Germany
- Coordinates: 53°33′44″N 13°15′42″E
- Owner: DB Netz
- Operator: DB Station&Service
- Lines: Stralsund-Neubrandenburg railway (KBS 205); Bützow–Szczecin railway (KBS 175); Neubrandenburg-Friedland railway
- Platforms: 4
- Tracks: 4
- Train operators: DB Regio Nordost

Other information
- Station code: 4363
- DS100 code: WN
- IBNR: 8010241
- Category: 3
- Website: www.bahnhof.de

History
- Opened: 11 November 1864; 161 years ago
- Electrified: 18 May 1993; 33 years ago

Services
Preceding station	DB Regio Nordost	Following station
Kleeth towards Bützow	RE 4	Sponholz towards Szczecin Główny or Ueckermünde Stadthafen
Kleeth towards Bützow	RE 4	Sponholz towards Ueckermünde Stadthafen
Altentreptow towards Stralsund Hbf	RE 5	Burg Stargard towards Berlin Südkreuz
Altentreptow towards Stralsund Hbf	RE 51	Burg Stargard towards Neustrelitz Hbf
Location
- Location within Mecklenburg-Vorpommern

Neubrandenburg (German: Bahnhof Neubrandenburg) is a railway station in the city of Neubrandenburg, Mecklenburg-Vorpommern, Germany. The station lies on the Stralsund-Neubrandenburg railway and Bützow–Szczecin railway and the train services are operated by DB Regio Nordost.

== Train services ==
The station is served by the following services:

Line	Route
RE 4	Lübeck – Neubrandenburg – Ueckermünde Stadthafen/Stettin
RE 5	Stralsund – Neubrandenburg – Neustrelitz – Oranienburg – Berlin – Berlin Südkreuz
RE 51	Stralsund – Neubrandenburg – Neustrelitz
