= Ueckermünde =

Town in Mecklenburg-Vorpommern, Germany

- Town
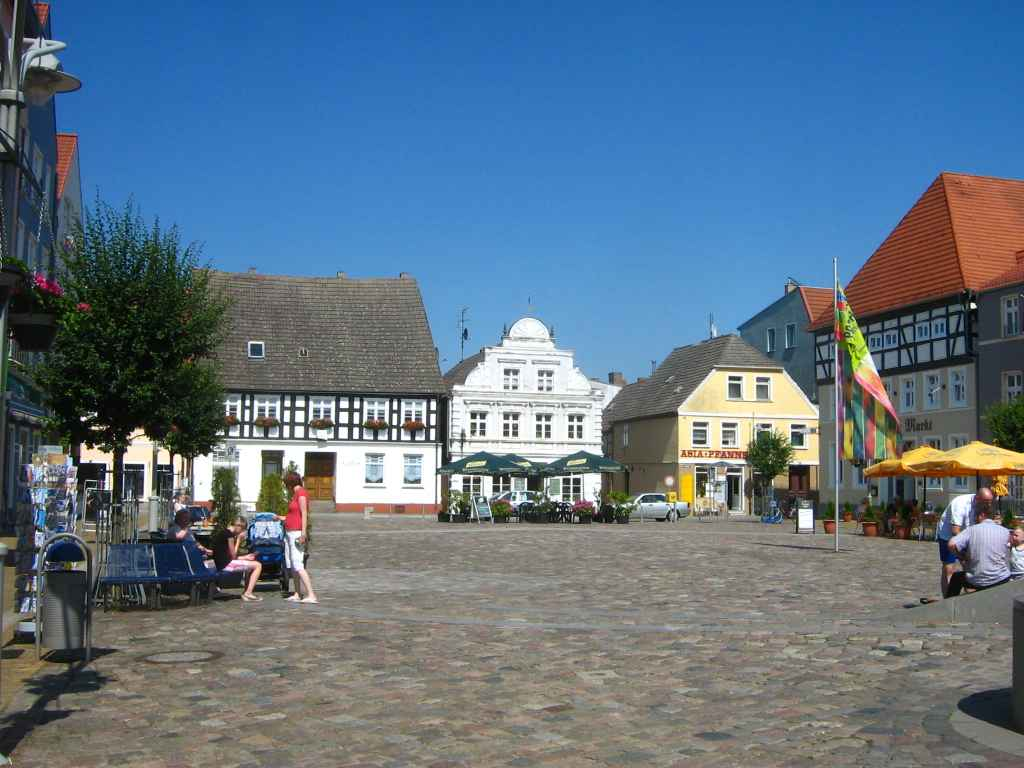
- Historical market square of Ueckermünde

- Coat of arms

- Location of Ueckermünde within Vorpommern-Greifswald district
- Interactive map of Ueckermünde
- Location within Germany Location within Mecklenburg-Vorpommern
- Coordinates: 53°44′20″N 14°02′40″E
- Country: Germany
- State: Mecklenburg-Vorpommern
- District: Vorpommern-Greifswald
- Founded: 1260
- Subdivisions: 4

Government
  - Mayor: Jürgen Kliewe

Area
  - Total: 85.87 km^{2} (33.15 sq mi)
- Elevation: 5 m (16 ft)

Population (2025-12-31)
  - Total: 8,651
  - Density: 100.7/km^{2} (260.9/sq mi)
- Time zone: UTC+01:00 (CET)
  - Summer (DST): UTC+02:00 (CEST)
- Postal codes: 17373
- Dialling codes: 039771
- Vehicle registration: VG, UEM
- Website: www.ueckermuende.de

Ueckermünde (German pronunciation: [ʏkɐˈmʏndə]) is a seaport town in northeast Germany, located in the district of Vorpommern-Greifswald, Western Pomerania, near Germany's border with Poland's Police County.

Ueckermünde has a long and varied history, going back to its founding by Slavs, the Ukrani, mentioned in 934 by Widukind of Corvey. The name Ucramund appears in documents from 1178. Since May 1, 2013 Ueckermünde has been an officially recognized seaside resort.

== History ==
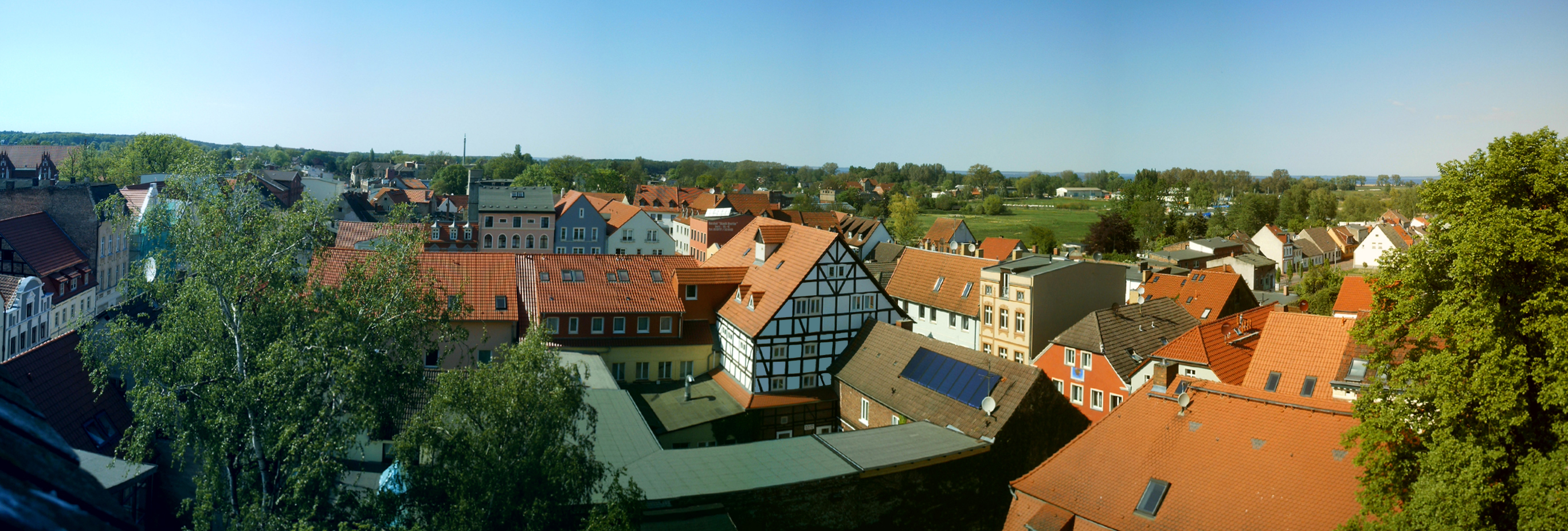
Old town

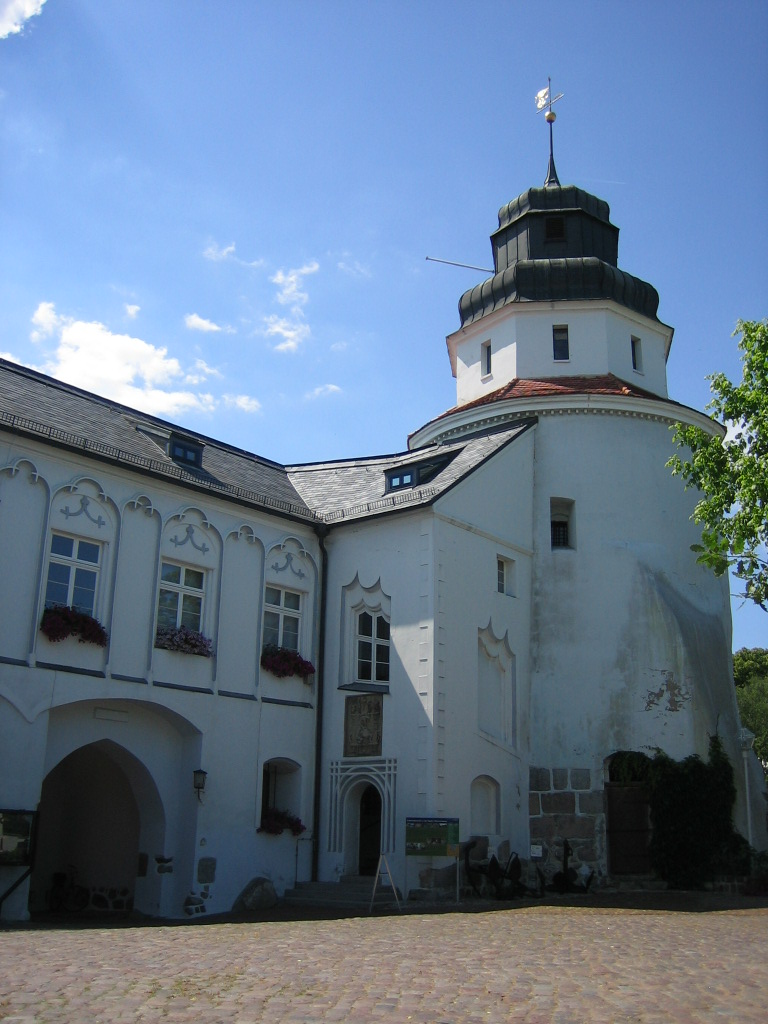
Castle tower

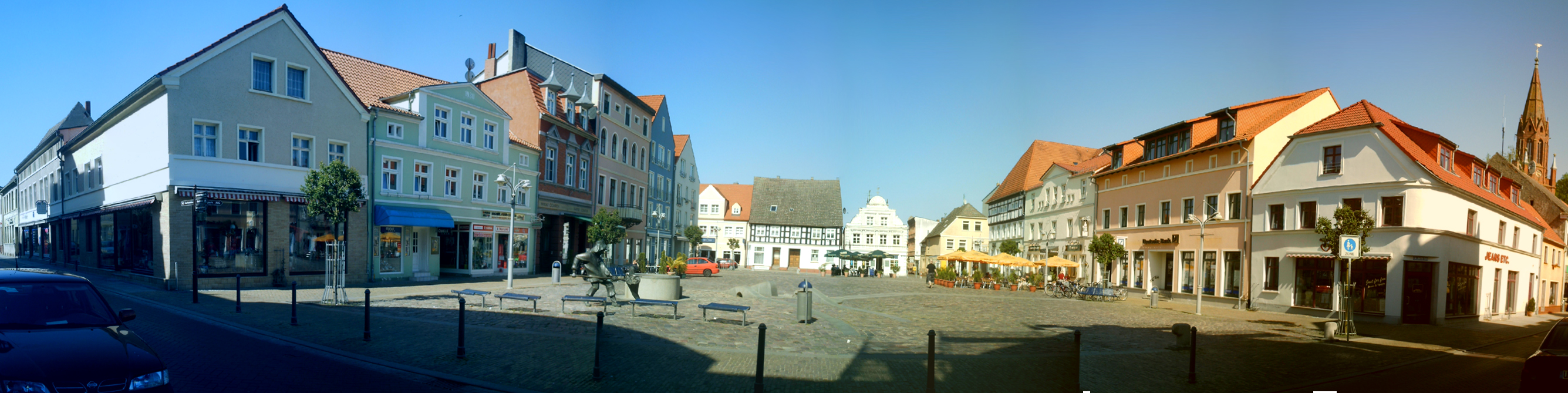
Historical market square of Ueckermünde

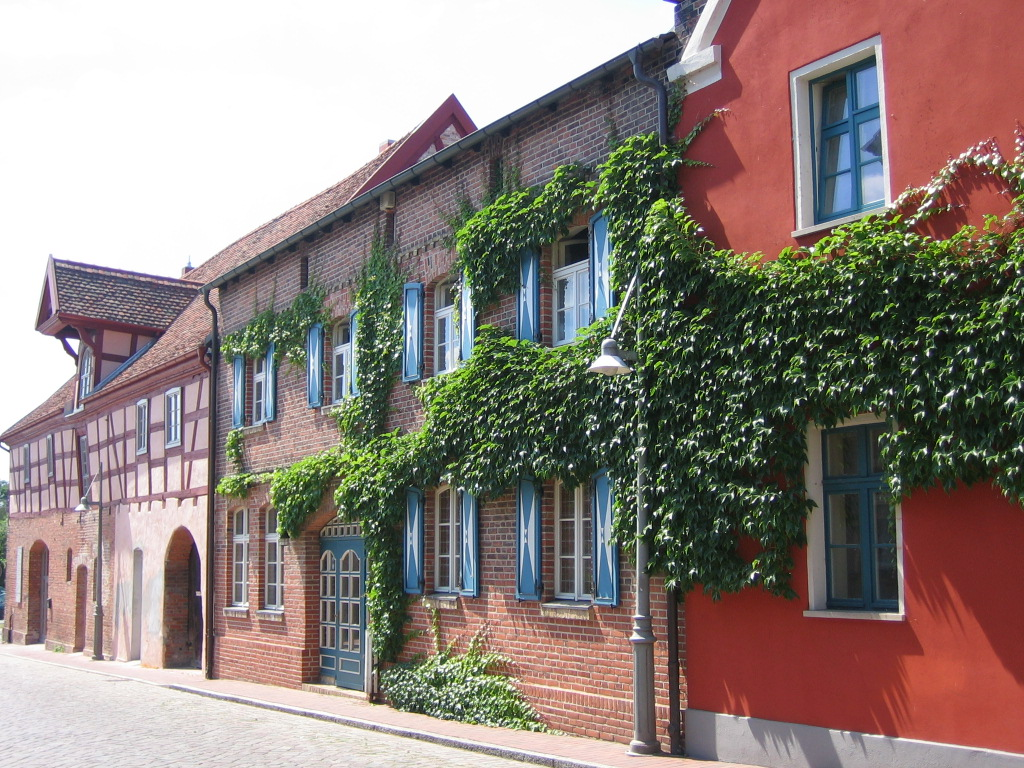
Berggasse

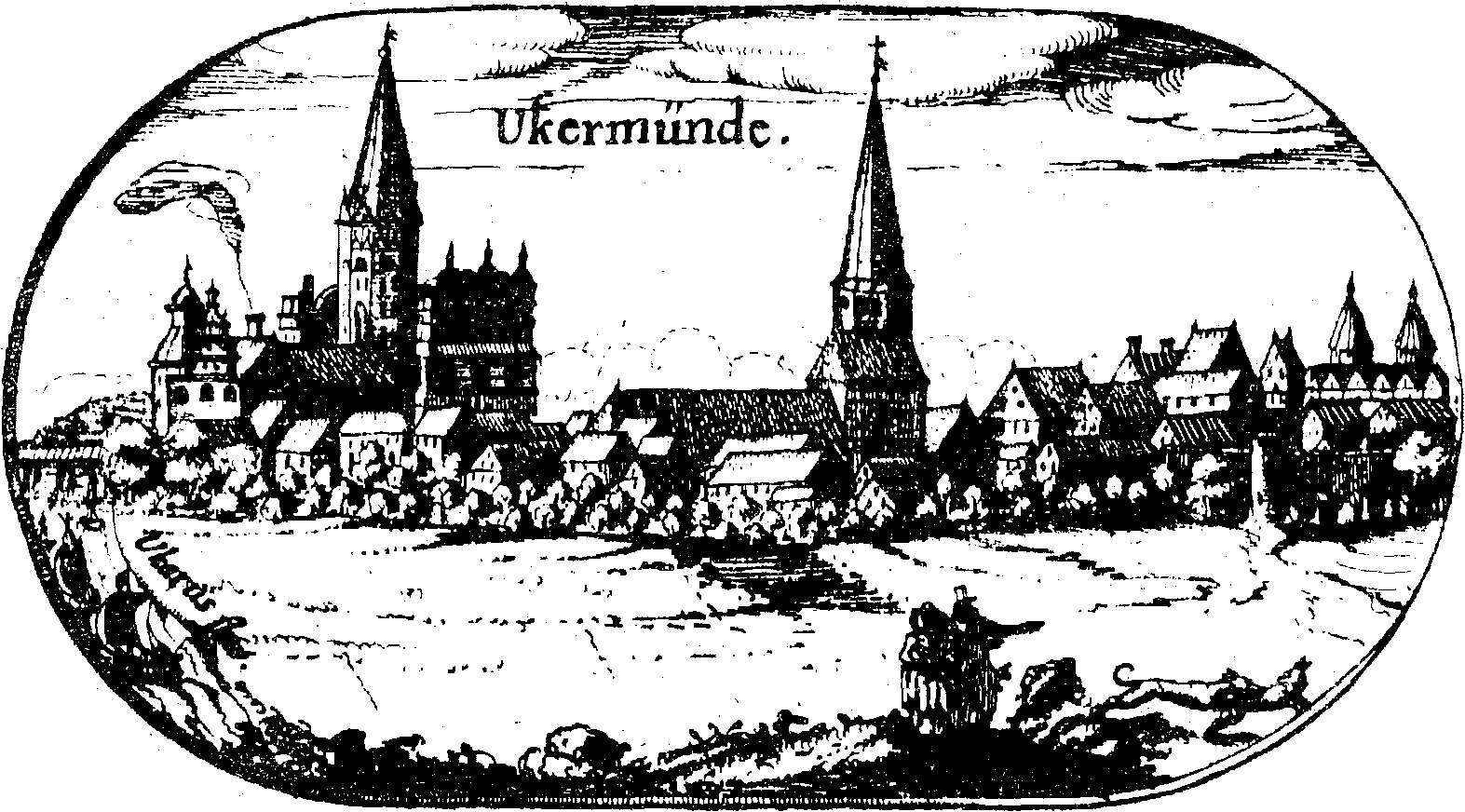
View on the map at the beginning of the 17th Lubinschen map

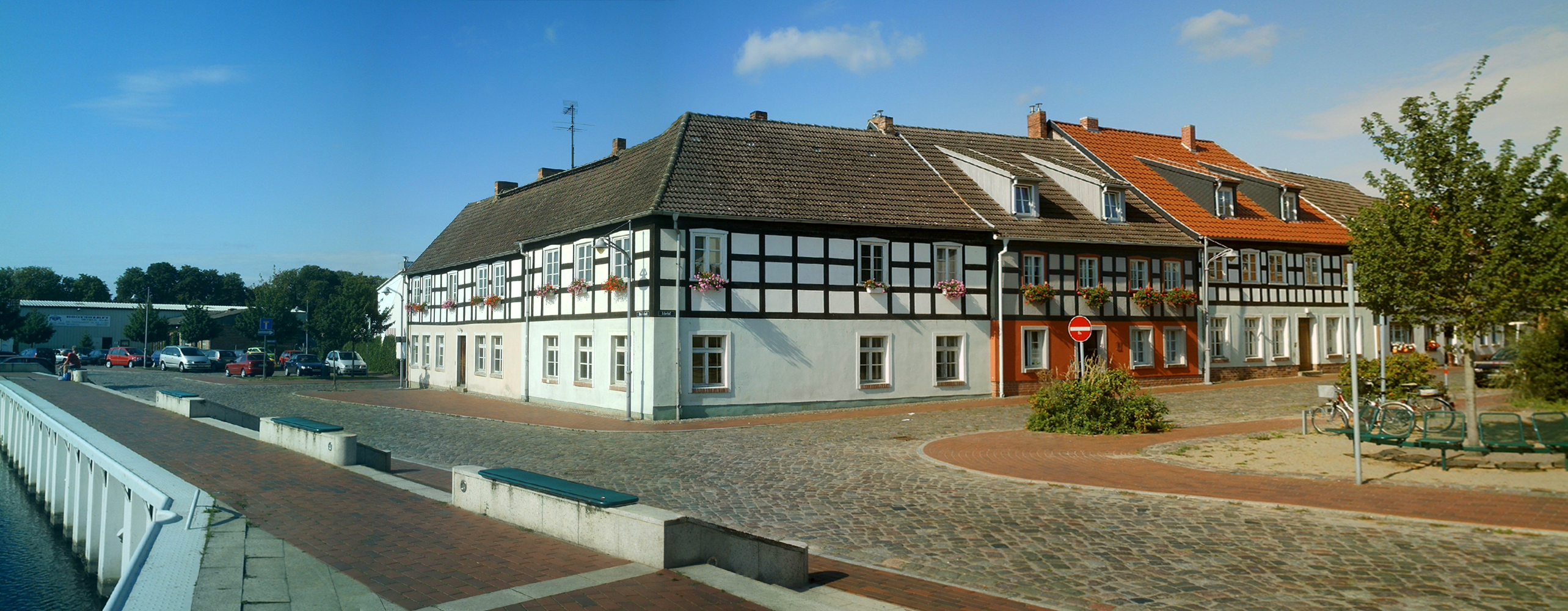
Ackerhof

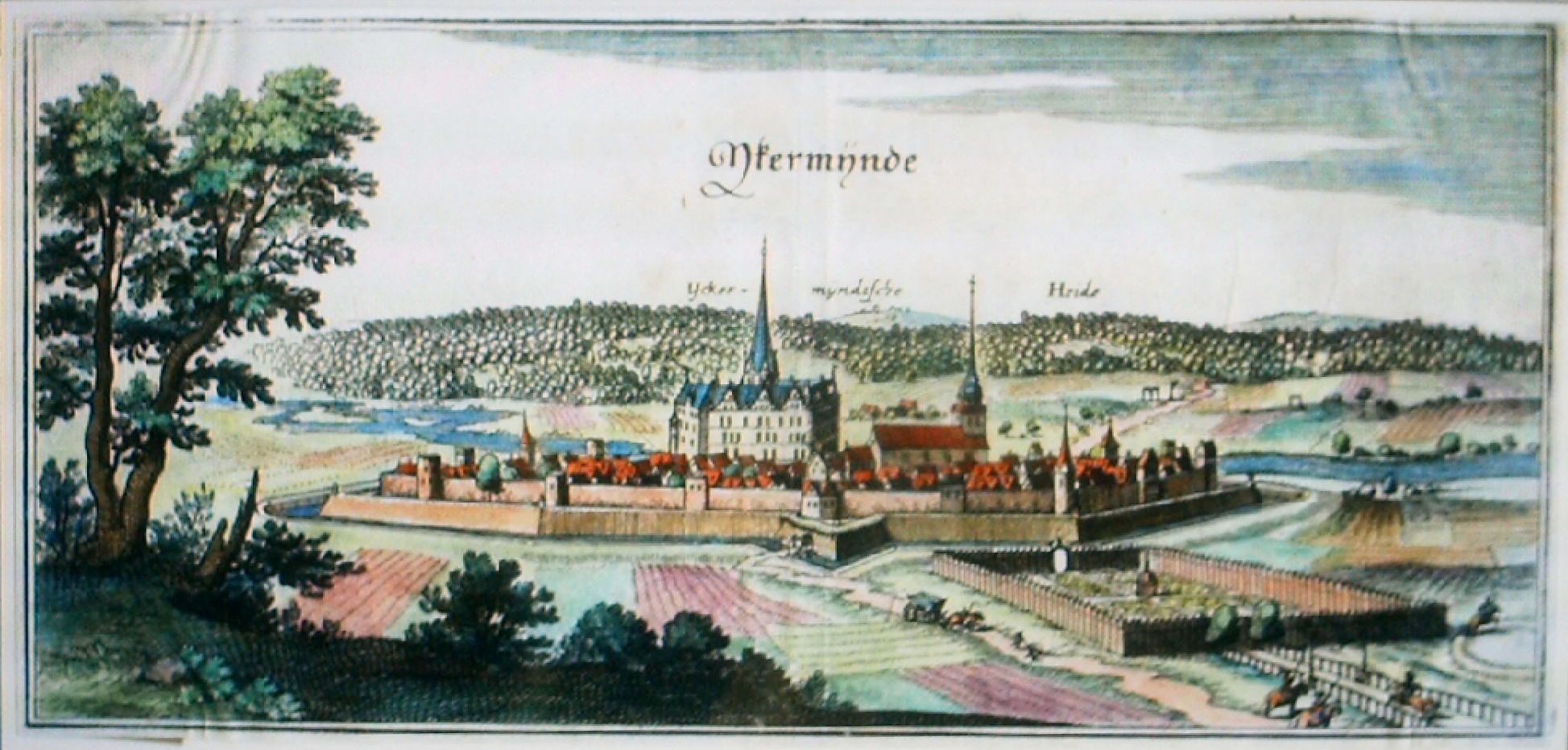
Ueckermünde in the 17th century

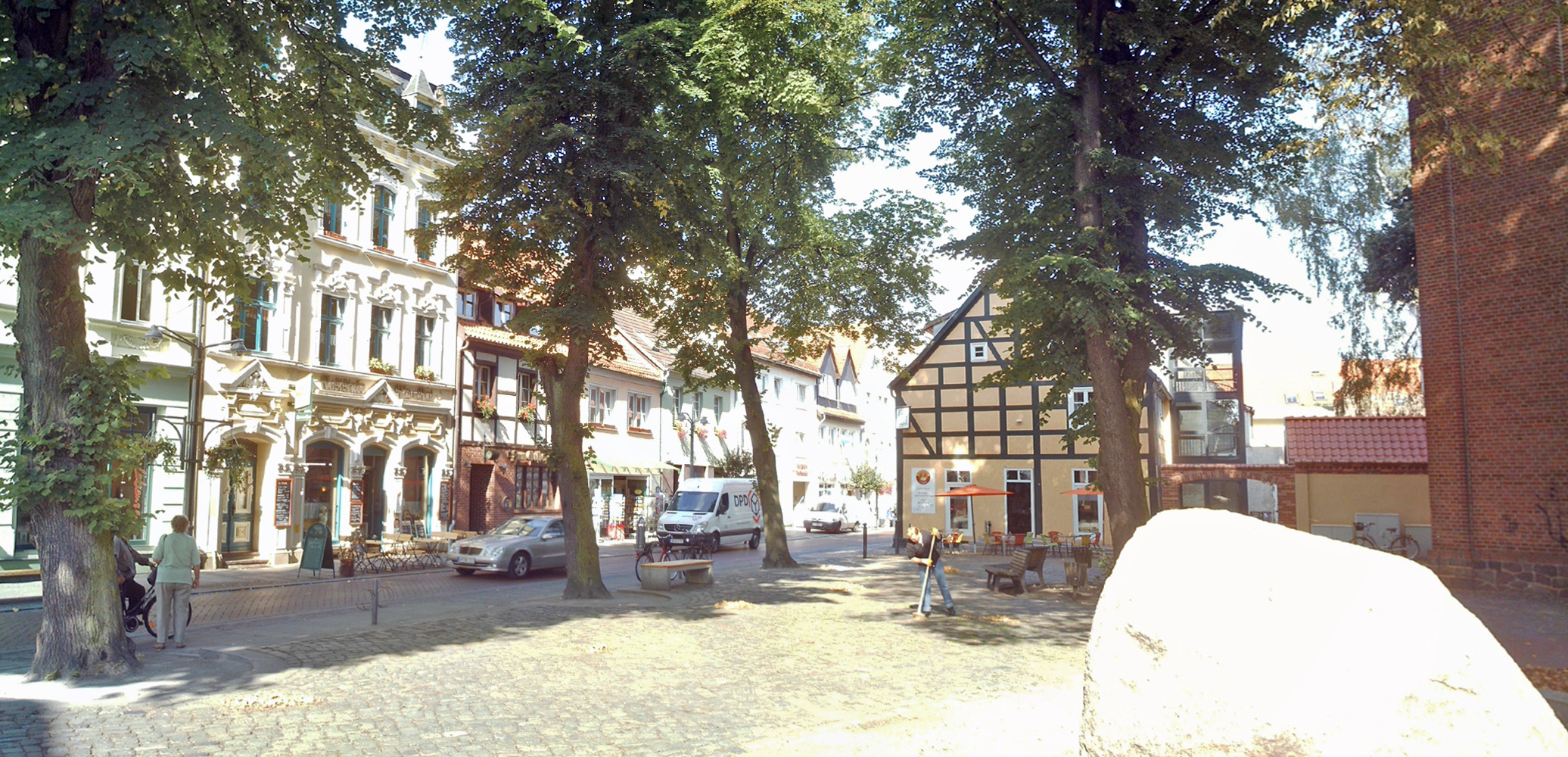
Church place

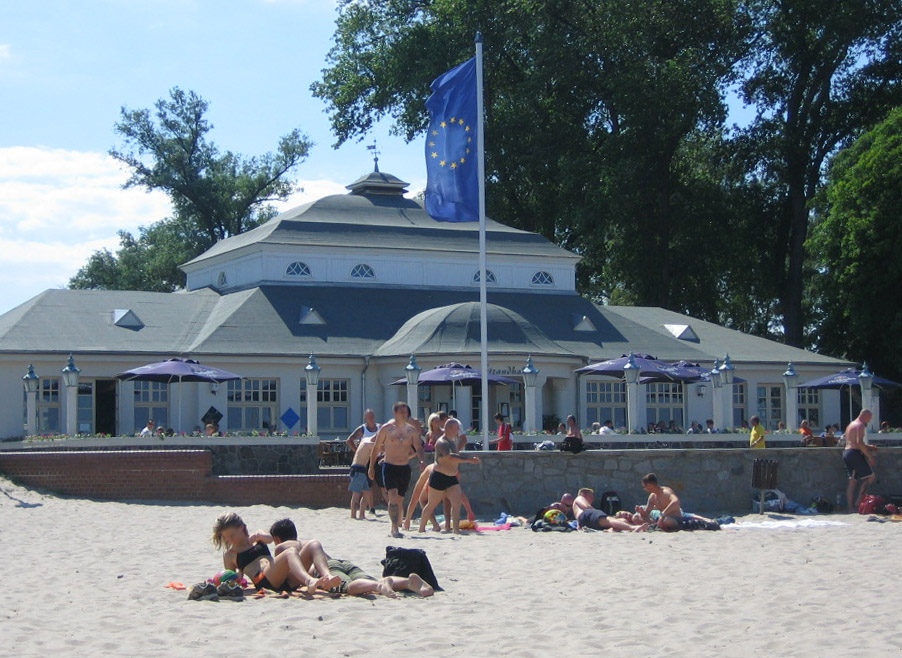
Beach Hall

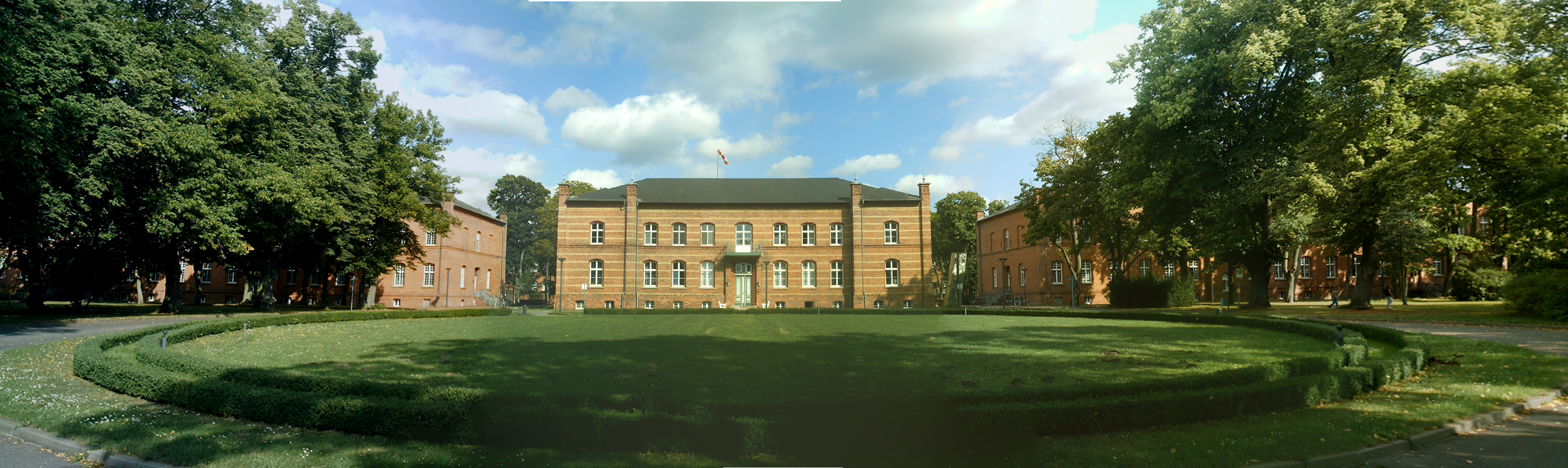
Hospital Ueckermünde

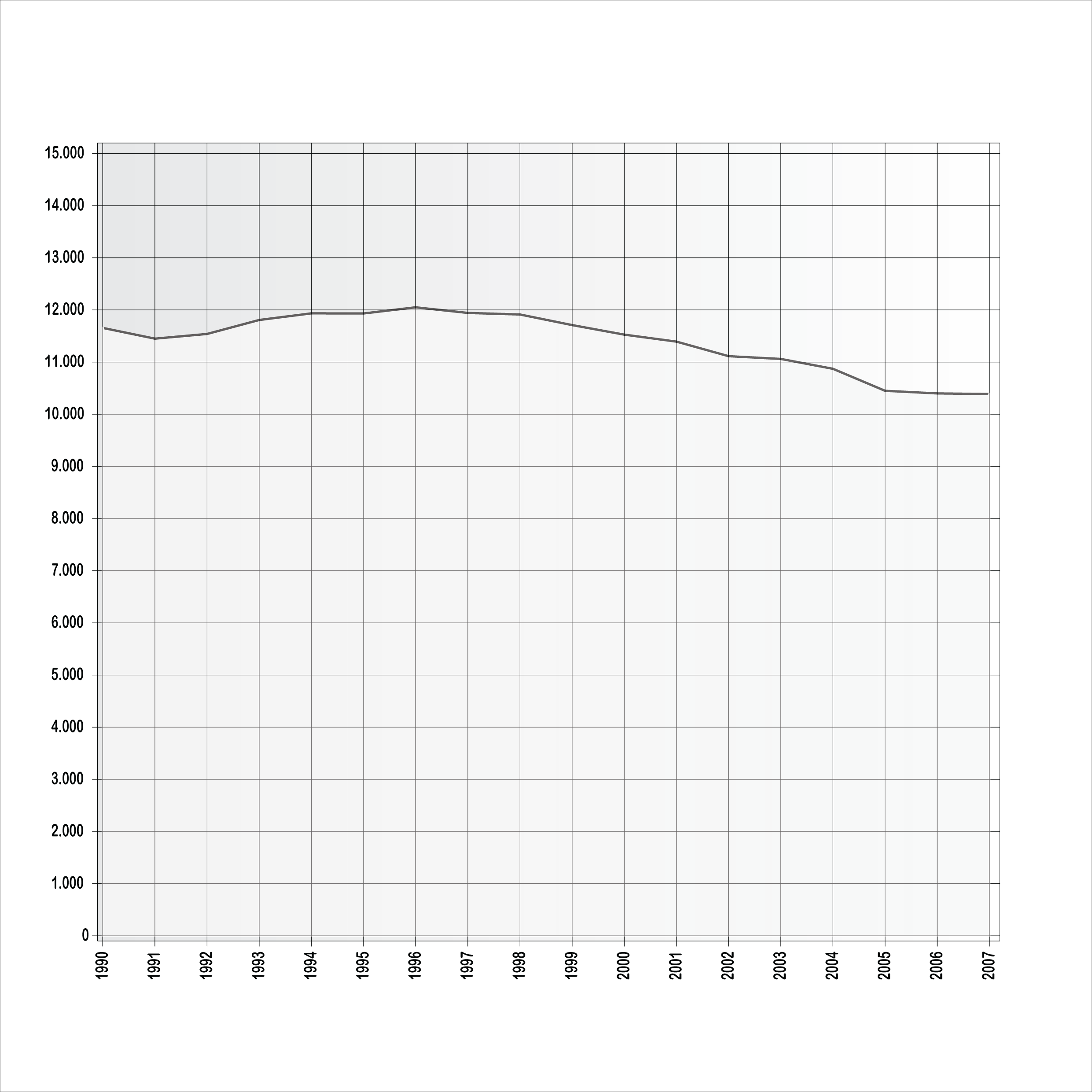
Population development

=== Name ===
The name Ueckermünde translates into "mouth of the Uecker". The Uecker River flows from Brandenburg, where it is called Ucker, into the Oder Lagoon. The river's name corresponds to the name of the adjacent region (Uckermark) and the name of the medieval Wendish tribe of the Ukr(an)i who inhabited the area prior to the German Ostsiedlung or eastern expansion. The first known reference to Ucramund is in an 1178 document. Later spellings included Ukeremund, Ukeremunde and Ukermunde (1284).

=== Middle Ages ===
In the old Slavonic era Ueckermünde's location made it a settlement of fishermen. In 1178 (according to other sources 1223) Ucramund was first mentioned and in 1243 the Monastery Grobe was built in Usedom. In 1260 Barnim I, the duke of Pomerania, founded a monastery and the original trade center was awarded a town charter under Lübeck Law. In 1276 the place was named Civitas, and in 1284 the Castrum Ukermunde, a fortress castle, was built by the Dukes of Pomerania. In the 13th century, Ueckermünde was a city within walls with two gates, to withstand the siege by troops of Brandenburg.

On 5 September 1327 by the Treaty of Ueckermünde the Pomeranian dukes and the Brandenburgian margrave agreed on a formal peace. The question of fiefdom was spared. Barnim III, Duke of Pomerania agreed to marry Mechthild (also Mathilda), daughter of Rudolf I, Duke of Bavaria, yet the marriage never takes place.

In the great fire of 1473 many of the medieval houses and the church were destroyed. In 1540 construction of the four wings of a castle was started by Pomeranian Duke Philipp I. In 1753 construction of the late-Gothic City Church St. Marien was started.

In 1540 the building of the four wings of the castle was started by Pomeranian Duke Philipp I.

=== 16th to 19th centuries ===
The city underwent many sieges and was conquered numerous times during the following centuries. The city was almost completely destroyed in the Thirty Years' War; of 1600 inhabitants, only 15 survived. The city was then repeatedly held by opposing forces. In 1631 a great fire destroyed about 40 houses and the Town Hall. In 1639 there were only ten habitable houses in the city. In 1648 after the Peace of Westphalia the town became Swedish. Christina, Queen Christina of Sweden, decided to settle towns in the area with Finns and Livonians.

In the course of the Great Northern War, after Russian and Saxon troops had occupied Stettin (now Szczecin) and Pomerania, Prussia made a payment of over four hundred thousand thalers for the provisional administration of the territory. With the Peace of Stockholm, on 21 January (or 1 February) 1720 a payment of two million crowns was made to purchase Western Pomerania with Stettin, Usedom and Wollin. Ueckermünde had thus become Prussian. It remained part of the Prussian Province of Pomerania from 1720 until 1945. That same year, 1720, the ruined castle's south wing and the rest of the keep was demolished.

In the early 18th century Ueckermünde was known for the royalty who liked to vacation there. The soldier king Friedrich Wilhelm I, August III, King of Poland and Elector of Saxony, King of Poland Stanisław Leszczyński, and the Russian monarch Peter the Great also spent time in the city.

The Swedish army conquered the city in 1761 and set up command in the castle district. In 1766 the Gothic church was replaced by a new building. In 1806 Ueckermünde was occupied by French troops.

Only at the end of the 18th, and the beginning of the 19th century did the city begin to flourish. Like Torgelow where, after the discovery of bog iron, several iron foundries were built, Ueckermünde saw the construction of roughly 50 brickworks in the 19th century and the city developed into an important trading, and shipbuilding center. From 1781 to 1795, 102 ships were launched. In the 1818 Prussian administrative reform the county of Ueckermünde (832 square kilometers and 24,000 inhabitants) was created.

Between 1819 and 1994 Ueckermünde was the county seat. By the middle of the 19th century, there were over 27 merchant ships owned by Ueckermünders.

In the Gründerzeit in the second half of the 19th century, many new buildings that shape the old town including the market and St. Mary's Church were built. At the end of the 19th century, an advanced medical facility St. Christopher's Hospital, known today as Ameos Clinic, was constructed.

=== Recent history ===
At the time of national socialism, the ten to twelve remaining Jewish families were driven into exile or murdered. An existing Jewish cemetery survived Nazi rule, but later fell into disrepair, and was desecrated. In 1961 a memorial was set up under state protection.

In 1945 the city surrendered without a fight or major war damage and was handed over to Soviet troops. From 1945 to 1952, Ueckermünde was part of the State of Mecklenburg-Vorpommern, from 1952 to 1990 of the Bezirk Neubrandenburg of East Germany and since 1990 again of Mecklenburg-Vorpommern.

In the castle in 1950, the Haffmuseum was opened and has been enlarged several times. In 1962, the construction of 18 hectares the Ueckermünde Animal Park began housing bout 400 animals of nearly 120 species. It receives over 150,000 visitors each year. At the end of the 1960s a new development to house over 6,000 people was built in a new district in an area in the west of the city.

The largest operation during East German period was a foundry with 1,100 employees in Ueckermünde. In 1997, the last of fifty brick factories in Ueckermünde was closed down.

The old town remained intact in GDR times but many buildings suffered major structural damage because of decades of lack of maintenance. 1991 saw the redevelopment of the historic city center, beginning with a preserved southern wing of the palace. The Old Bulwark, an essential part of the old port, has been rehabilitated. The district Ueckermünde East (Garden City), was renovated as part of the basic urban renewal East. The area had been characterized by prefabricated buildings with a high housing vacancy, leading to partial restoration measures and restructuring processes.

The early 1990s also saw the restoration of many hotels, guest houses, apartments, and shops in the city center. A marina with 400 berths and 200 apartments was built in the vicinity of the Szczecin Lagoon.

In 2001 Ueckermünde received the title of "state-approved resort". For its exemplary city planning, Ueckermünde was given a national award in 2002 along with the cities of Eggesin and Torgelow.

== Geography ==
The town, lying on the Oder Lagoon (Oderhaff, Stettiner Haff) is Germany's northeasternmost port city. It is recognized by the state as a resort town, and it is home to the last palace of the Dukes of Pomerania still in existence on German soil. The town's namesake, the River Uecker, empties into the Lagoon; Ueckermünde means "mouth of the Uecker".

The surrounding area, even when seen from the odd spot that reaches 20 m above sea level, is almost flat. The city also gave the Ueckermünder Heide (heath and woodland) its name. It is Western Pomerania's biggest wooded area, and stretches from the northwest to the southeast over 50 km to the Polish town of Police (Pölitz in German).

== Climate ==
Climate data for Ueckermünde (1991–2020 normals)
Month	Jan	Feb	Mar	Apr	May	Jun	Jul	Aug	Sep	Oct	Nov	Dec	Year
Mean daily maximum °C (°F)	3.0 (37.4)	4.3 (39.7)	7.6 (45.7)	13.1 (55.6)	17.7 (63.9)	20.9 (69.6)	23.0 (73.4)	23.1 (73.6)	18.8 (65.8)	13.4 (56.1)	7.4 (45.3)	4.0 (39.2)	13.0 (55.4)
Daily mean °C (°F)	0.7 (33.3)	1.5 (34.7)	3.8 (38.8)	8.6 (47.5)	13.1 (55.6)	16.4 (61.5)	18.5 (65.3)	18.3 (64.9)	14.3 (57.7)	9.6 (49.3)	4.9 (40.8)	1.8 (35.2)	9.3 (48.7)
Mean daily minimum °C (°F)	−1.9 (28.6)	−1.5 (29.3)	0.1 (32.2)	3.8 (38.8)	7.9 (46.2)	11.3 (52.3)	13.6 (56.5)	13.3 (55.9)	9.9 (49.8)	6.0 (42.8)	2.3 (36.1)	−0.6 (30.9)	5.3 (41.5)
Average precipitation mm (inches)	41.4 (1.63)	31.1 (1.22)	35.0 (1.38)	29.4 (1.16)	52.5 (2.07)	60.7 (2.39)	69.3 (2.73)	56.4 (2.22)	49.1 (1.93)	46.8 (1.84)	43.0 (1.69)	41.4 (1.63)	556.1 (21.89)
Average precipitation days (≥ 1.0 mm)	16.4	14.5	13.8	10.9	12.9	13.0	14.3	13.2	12.5	14.9	15.2	17.3	168.9
Average relative humidity (%)	86.6	83.2	79.0	73.7	73.2	73.2	74.7	75.2	80.3	84.5	88.6	88.3	80.0
Mean monthly sunshine hours	44.3	69.1	130.9	203.0	236.8	230.7	237.1	223.2	163.9	104.8	47.1	31.9	1,717.3
Source: World Meteorological Organization

== History of Oder Lagoon ==
In 1889 a River Bathhouse opened on the Uecker. In 1924 the lido opened in Ueckermünde, and in 1927 the Beach Hall opened at the Ueckermünde Oder Lagoon. In 1935 the Urban Spa and Tourist Association were founded. From this period, the first postcards of Ueckermünde reading "Haffbad Ueckermünde, the cheap resort for guests looking for relaxation" appeared. After the war, large parts of the beach had very rough trenches, and the pier, used for mooring passenger ships and seaplanes, was destroyed.

In the 1950s, there was a steamboat pier at the head Uecker (1959); the beach park was designed and the beach hall was rebuilt again. In the 1960s the city was built around a ten-kilometer-long belt declared a conservation area. In 1969 the municipal association for recreation Haffküste Ueckermünde responsible for the city Ueckermünde was formed. In the following year the Hafftourist, an economic project of the local communities Ueckermünde, Mönkebude, Grambin and Vogelsang, was created to promote joint tourism ventures. After the reunification the whole beach was reorganized and expanded and made accessible.

=== History of the Ueckermünde Sanatorium ===
Ueckermünde has had a large psychiatric hospital for many years. The hospital, now called the Christopher's Hospital, was, in the late 19th and beginning of the 20th century, highly progressive, employing innovative treatments and therapies. Patients with mental as well as physical disabilities were not only treated, but as far as possible employed and promoted.

With the takeover by the Nazis, the political environment for dealing with the mentally ill and disabled changed. The Ueckermünder hospital gained notoriety in the wake of the so-called Action T4, with the large-scale murders of tens of thousands of helpless patients, many of them deemed "unworthy" children. Ueckermünde was obviously an important center of this action in Pomerania. Murders took place in medical institutions in Western Pomerania and partly in converted SS-barracks. The murders of hundreds were covered up and their deaths entered as "normal" disease-related deaths in hospital records.

=== Parts of town ===
The following communities belong to Ueckermünde:

- Bellin
- Berndshof
- Rosenmühl
- Neuhof

=== Neighbouring communities ===
Clockwise from the east are: Vogelsang-Warsin, Eggesin, Liepgarten, Lübs, Mönkebude and Grambin.

== Local council ==
After the elections from May 2014, the local council has 21 members.

Party / List	CDU	The Left	SPD	Voters association|We from here
seats	8	6	4	3

The NPD did not run for the local elections in 2014. With the name „Wir von Hier“ a voters association with NPD-functionary Marko Müller ran for the local council.

== City partnerships ==
Ueckermünde is twinned with:

- Nowe Warpno, Poland
- (Germany) Sande, Lower Saxony

== Towns near Ueckermünde ==
- Szczecin City (Poland)
- Torgelow (Germany)
- Eggesin (Germany)
- Pasewalk (Germany)
- Nowe Warpno (Poland)
- Police (Poland)
- Świnoujście (Poland)

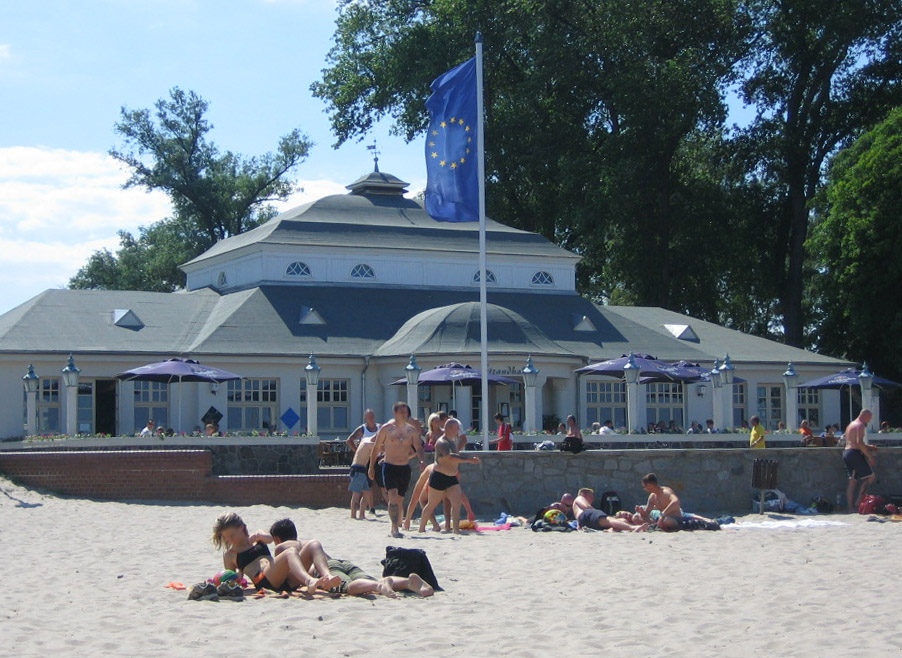
Ueckermünde beach (Strandhalle)

== Infrastructure ==
Ueckermünde can be reached from the Pasewalk-West or Pasewalk-Süd interchange on Autobahn A 20. Bundesstraße (Federal Highway) B 109 running between Anklam and Prenzlau passes 13 km to the town's west. Ueckermünde is the last stop on the railway line from Pasewalk. Passenger ships sail regularly to Szczecin, Świnoujście and Kamminke on the island of Usedom. Also, the Berlin-Usedom cycling highway passes through the town.

== Sightseeing ==
- Stadtschloss (castle with museum)
- Stadthafen (harbour)
- Historical market square
- Ueckermünder Zoo
- Strandhalle ("Beach Hall")

== Notable people from Ueckermünde ==
=== Honorary citizens ===
- 1836 Johann Gottfried Ravenstein, preacher and deacon
- 1849 Friedrich Wilhelm Wenzel, jurist
- 1875 Otto Friedrich Weber, jurist
- 1888 Earl of Rittberg, district administrator
- 1917 Ludwig von Schröder, (1854–1933), admiral
- 1918 Max Münter, industrialist
- 1924 Ernst Albrecht, politician
- 1929 Karl Leitz, businessman
- 1939 August Bartelt, teacher and organist
- 1975 Machmud Gafarow, city commander
- 1985 Ernst Decker, resistance fighter
- 1999 Marianne Buggenhagen, (born 1953), disabled athlete, 6-time Olympic medallist, 7-time world champion and 125-time East German champion in disabled sports

=== Persons born in Ueckermünde ===
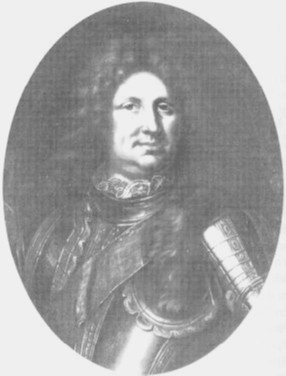
Friedrich Magnus Baden Durlach

- Friedrich VII. Magnus of Zähringen (1647–1709), Margrave of Baden-Durlach, 1677/1709
- Louis H. F. Wagner (?? - 1875), convicted and executed murderer in Maine, United States
- Julius Prott (1841–1901), also known as Giulio Perotti, German opera singer
- Max Matern (1902 in Berndshof – 1935), Communist Party of Germany (KPD) member, convicted of murder and executed; glorified as a martyr by KPD and East German propaganda.
- Georg Schewe (1909–1989), German naval officer
- Gregor Laschen (dewiki) (1941–2018), German writer and editor
- Uwe Saeger (dewiki) (born 1948), German writer
- Michael Droese (born 1952), German track and field athlete
- Marianne Buggenhagen (born 1953), track and field athletel 6-time paralympic medallist, 7-time world champion
- Peter Thiede (born 1968), rower, former helmsman of the Deutschlandachter
- Kerstin Fiedler-Wilhelm (dewiki) (born 1968), German politician and former member of the Parliament of Mecklenburg-Vorpommern
