= Pasewalk station =

Railway station in Pasewalk, Germany

Pasewalk
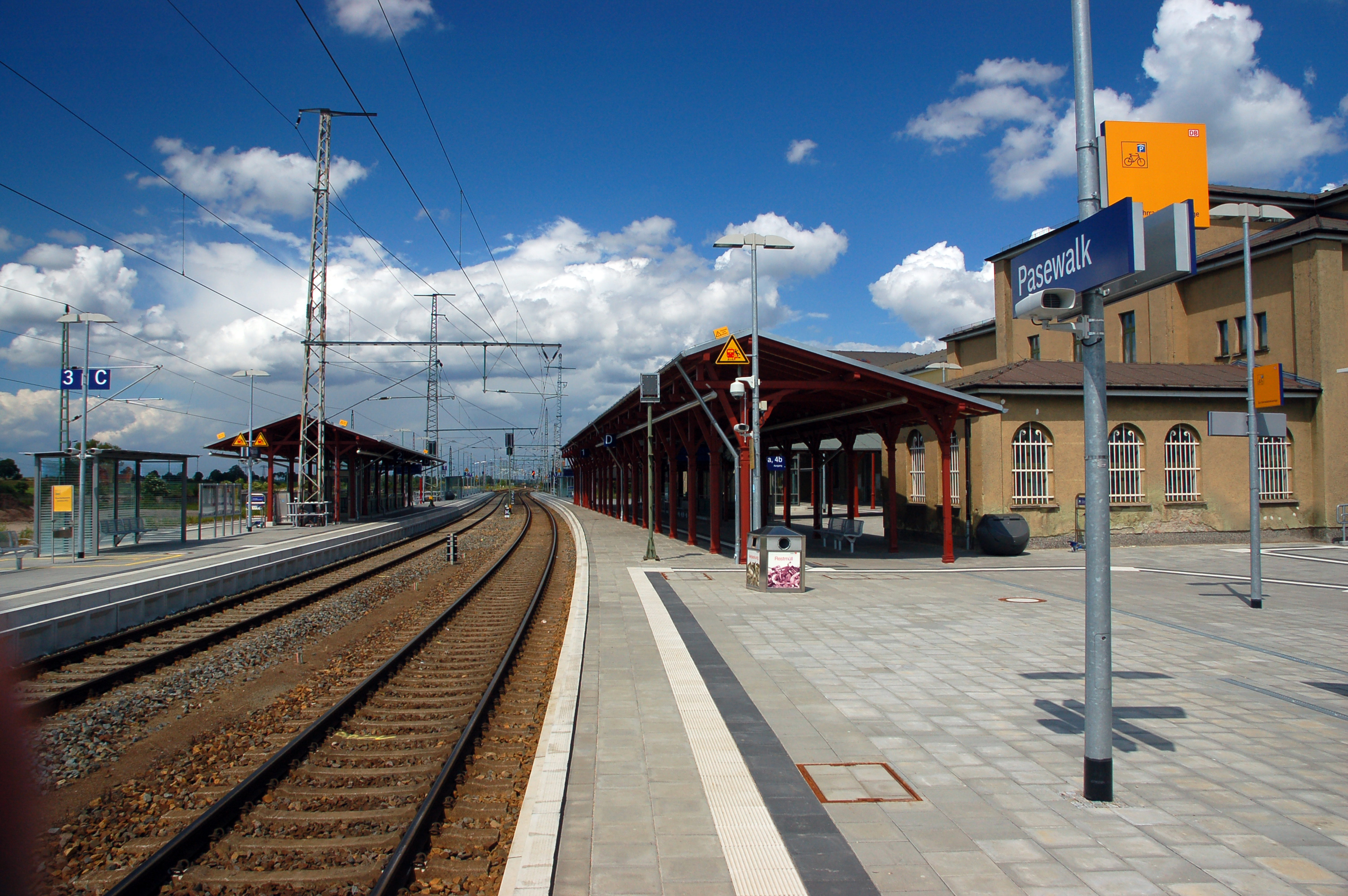
- 2009

General information
- Location: Am Bahnhof; 17309 Pasewalk; Mecklenburg-Vorpommern; Germany
- Coordinates: 53°30′54″N 13°59′20″E
- Elevation: 7 m (23 ft)
- Owner: Deutsche Bahn
- Operator: DB Station&Service
- Lines: Angermünde–Stralsund railway (KBS 203); Bützow–Szczecin railway (KBS 175)
- Platforms: 1 island platform 2 side platforms
- Tracks: 5
- Train operators: DB Fernverkehr; DB Regio Nordost

Construction
- Parking: yes
- Cycle facilities: yes
- Accessible: yes

Other information
- Station code: 4870
- DS100 code: WP
- IBNR: 8010268
- Category: 4
- Website: www.bahnhof.de

History
- Opened: 16 March 1863; 163 years ago
- Electrified: 25 May 1988; 38 years ago

Services
Preceding station	DB Fernverkehr	Following station
Anklam towards Ostseebad Binz	ICE 15	Prenzlau towards Darmstadt Hbf
Preceding station	DB Regio Nordost	Following station
Jatznick towards Stralsund Hbf	RE 3	Nechlin towards Jüterbog or Lutherstadt Wittenberg Hbf
Blumenhagen towards Bützow	RE 4	Pasewalk Ost towards Szczecin Główny
Blumenhagen towards Bützow	RE 4	Sandförde towards Ueckermünde Stadthafen
Jatznick towards Stralsund Hbf	RE 30	Prenzlau towards Angermünde
Location

Pasewalk (German: Bahnhof Pasewalk) is a railway station in the town of Pasewalk, Mecklenburg-Vorpommern, Germany. The station lies on the Angermünde–Stralsund railway and the Bützow–Szczecin railway. The train services are operated by Deutsche Bahn and Ostdeutsche Eisenbahn.

== Rail services ==
In the 2026 timetable the following lines stop at the station:

Line	Route		Frequency
ICE 15	Saarbrücken – Kaiserslautern – Mannheim – Darmstadt – Frankfurt – Erfurt – Halle – Berlin – Pasewalk – Stralsund – Binz		Five times a day
RE 3	Stralsund – Greifswald – Pasewalk – Eberswalde – Berlin – Ludwigsfelde – Jüterbog		Every 2 hours
RE 4	Bützow – Güstrow – Neubrandenburg – Pasewalk –	Szczecin Glowny	Every 2 hours
RE 4	Bützow – Güstrow – Neubrandenburg – Pasewalk –	Ueckermünde	Every 2 hours
RE 30	Stralsund – Greifswald – Pasewalk – Prenzlau – Angermünde		Every 2 hours
