= Ueckermünde Stadthafen station =

Railway station in Mecklenburg-Vorpommern, Germany

Ueckermünde Stadthafen
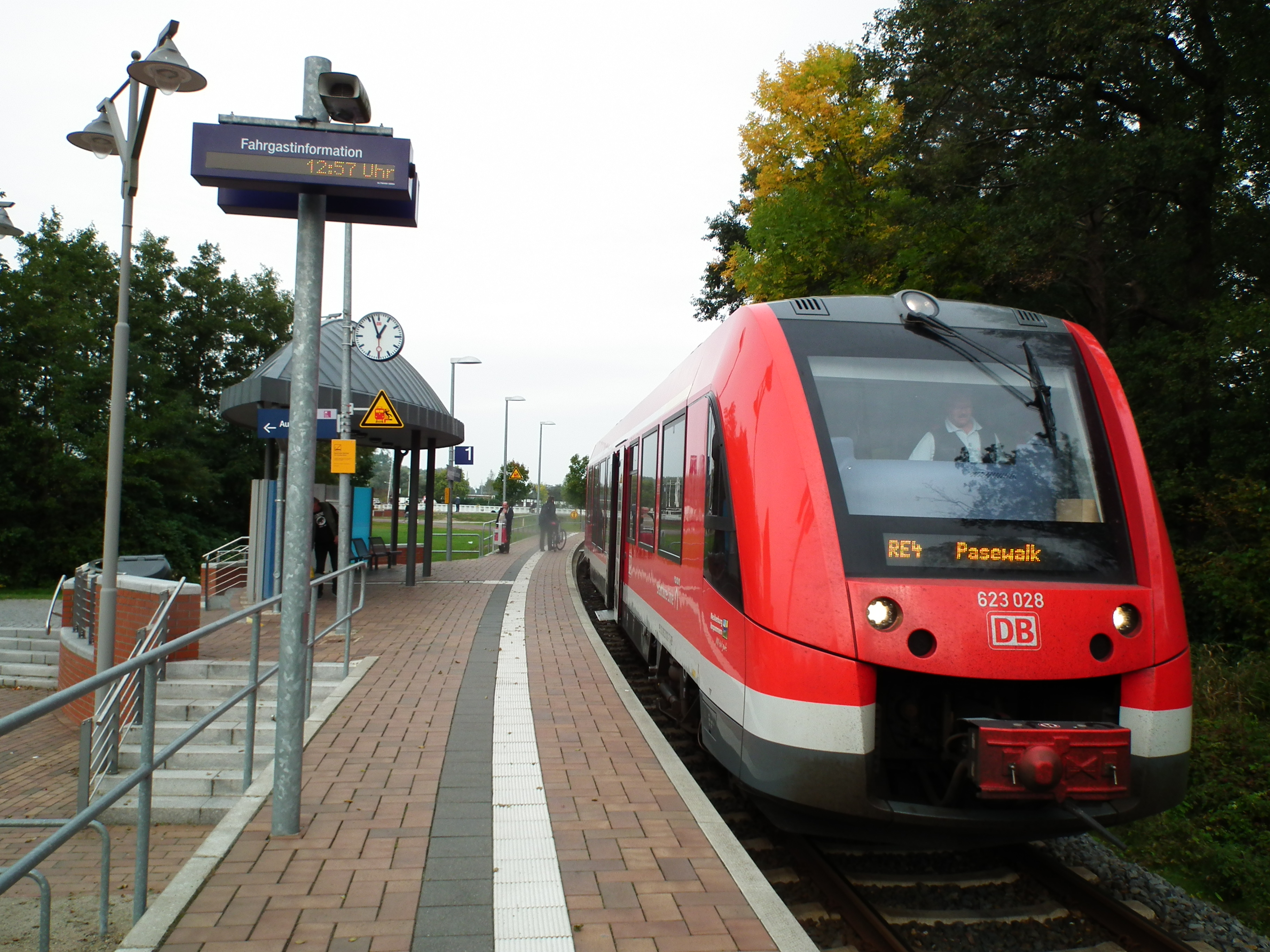
- 2017

General information
- Location: Neues Bollwerk; 17373 Ueckermünde; Mecklenburg-Vorpommern; Germany
- Coordinates: 53°44′10″N 14°03′06″E
- System: Hp
- Owner: Deutsche Bahn
- Operator: DB Station&Service
- Line: Jatznick–Ueckermünde railway line
- Platforms: 1 side platform
- Tracks: 1
- Train operators: DB Regio Nordost

Other information
- Station code: 8162
- DS100 code: WUMH
- IBNR: 8013156
- Category: 7
- Website: www.bahnhof.de

History
- Opened: 15 August 2009; 17 years ago

Services
| Preceding station | DB Regio Nordost | Following station |
|---|---|---|
| Ueckermünde towards Bützow | RE 4 | Terminus |
Location
- Location within Mecklenburg-Vorpommern Location within Germany Location within Europe

Ueckermünde Stadthafen (German: Bahnhof Ueckermünde Stadthafen) is a railway station in the town of Ueckermünde, Mecklenburg-Vorpommern, Germany. The station lies on the Jatznick–Ueckermünde railway line and the train services are operated by DB Regio Nordost. The current station opened on 15 August 2009, as part of the northern extension of the line into Ueckermünde.

== Services ==
As of the December 2024 timetable change, the following services stop at Ueckermünde Stadthafen:

- DB Regio Nordost: Service to Pasewalk, with some trains continuing to Bützow.
