= Bützow station =

Railway station in Germany

Bützow
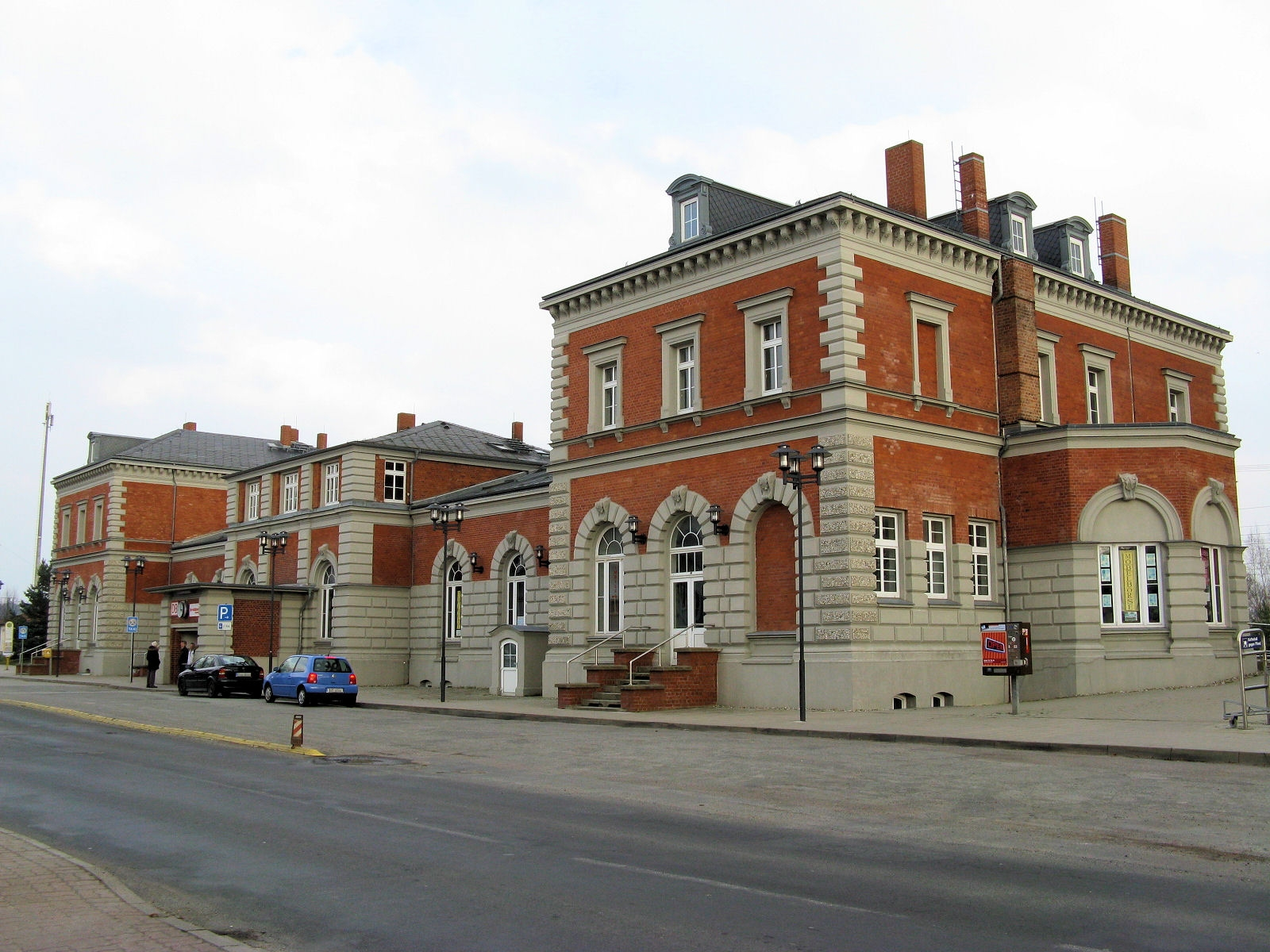

General information
- Location: Bahnhofstr. 40, Bützow, Mecklenburg-Vorpommern; Germany
- Coordinates: 53°50′13″N 11°59′51″E
- Lines: Bad Kleinen–Rostock (KBS 100,KBS 175); Bützow–Szczecin (KBS 175)
- Platforms: 3

Construction
- Accessible: Yes
- Architectural style: Renaissance Revival

Other information
- Station code: 1014
- DS100 code: WB
- IBNR: 8010066
- Category: 4
- Website: www.bahnhof.de

History
- Opened: 13 May 1850; 176 years ago
- Electrified: 12 April 1986; 40 years ago

Services
Preceding station	DB Fernverkehr	Following station
Schwerin Hbf towards Hamburg-Altona	ICE 33	Rostock Hbf towards Ostseebad Binz or Greifswald
Bad Kleinen towards Leipzig Hbf	IC 57	Rostock Hbf towards Warnemünde
Preceding station	DB Regio Nordost	Following station
Blankenberg (Meckl) towards Hamburg Hbf	RE 1	Schwaan towards Rostock Hbf
Blankenberg (Meckl) towards Lübeck Hbf	RE 4	Güstrow towards Szczecin Główny or Ueckermünde Stadthafen
Blankenberg (Meckl) towards Ludwigslust	RB 28	Schwaan towards Rostock Hbf
Location
- Location within Mecklenburg-Vorpommern Location within Germany Location within Europe

Bützow station is in the city of Bützow in the district of Rostock in the German state of Mecklenburg-Vorpommern and is served in local and long-distance services. It is on the Bad Kleinen–Rostock railway and is the starting point of the line to Szczecin.

== Location and facilities ==
The station is located 1.7 km southeast of the city centre near the Warnow valley on state highway 11. To its north-east the railway crosses the Bützow–Güstrow canal in its last metres before its confluence with the Warnow river.

The impressive entrance building was built in the style of the Renaissance Revival style in 1879. It has two two-storey towers and a one-story central section with a central projection. It lies west of the line. Track 1 is located directly next to the building and tracks 2 and 3 are on an island platform, which can be reached by a pedestrian tunnel. Both platforms are covered. The station is not fully accessible for the disabled. Located east of the platforms themselves are more rail tracks that are not used for passenger services.

The station with its individual components is listed on the heritage list of Mecklenburg-Vorpommern: the station building, platforms, freight yard office, community centre, water tower, engine shed with turntable, water pump, former gas works, a ground-floor annex building at the southeast boundary of the railway station premises, signal box and a building containing storage and a small workshop.

== History ==
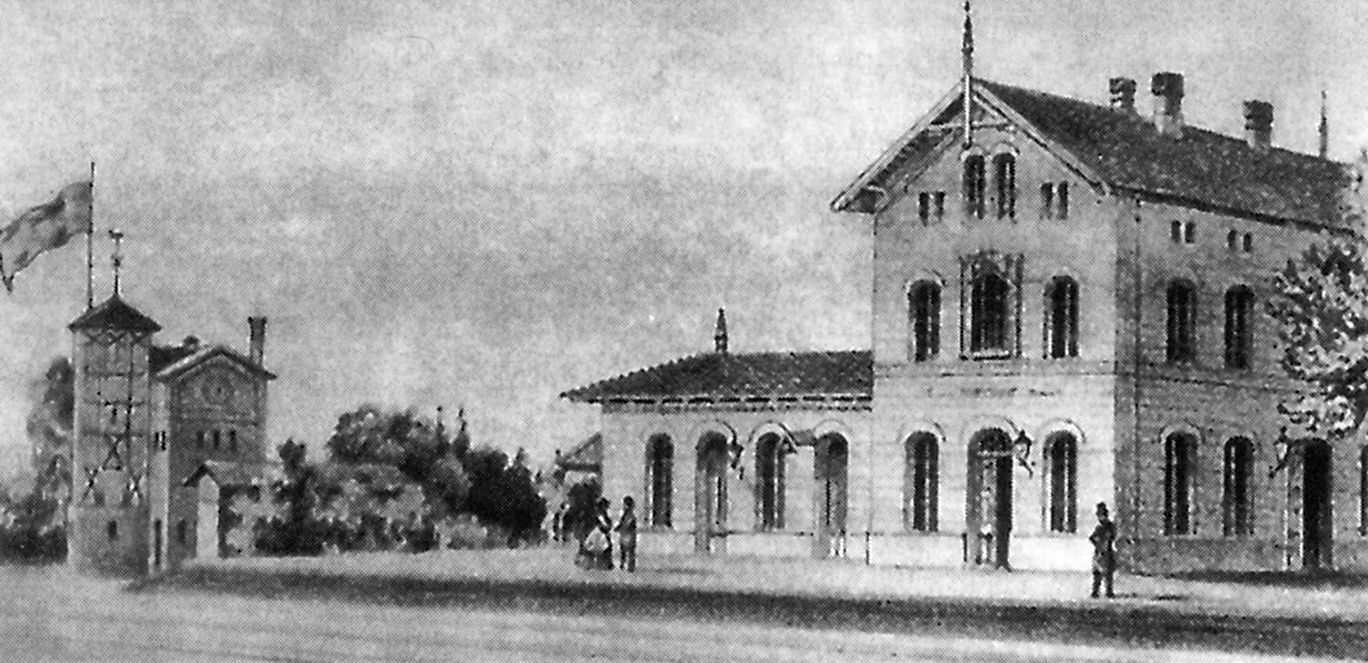
Original station building of 1850

Bützow station was opened with the (Bad) Kleinen–Rostock line and the branch line to Güstrow on 13 May 1850. Construction of the first entrance building, a roundhouse, a carriage shed, a water tower and two signal boxes started in 1849. The diversion of the Nebel river was necessary in Wolken, a district of Bützow. The first train, which was loaded with sleepers and rails, arrived at the station on 26 November 1849, creating great public interest. A day before the opening of passenger services the station was formally inaugurated. Initially two trains ran on the Rostock–Hagenow route and three on the Bützow–Güstrow route each day.

The line towards Güstrow was extended to Neubrandenburg in 1864 and to Strasburg in 1867, which increased the importance of the station as a transport hub. The construction of the Bützow–Güstrow canal made necessary the reconstruction of the railway facilities in Bützow. The station was originally a “wedge” station (Keilbahnhof) with the line to Güstrow branching off to the south-east distance from the line to Kleinen. The line to Güstrow was realigned after the reconstruction, creation a new approximately three kilometre-long section that now branches off to the east from the line to Rostock. On the route of the old line there is now a road.

The station building was remodelled in 1879 and it was replaced in 1892/93 by an enlarged building in the Renaissance Revival style. The corner buildings were occupied by the homes of rail officials and in the central section there were rail premises, a ticket office and separate waiting rooms for different classes.

With the rerouting of the line direct services from Hamburg and Lubeck to Güstrow and Stettin (now Szczecin) were possible. This route developed over the years to 1945 as the main long-distance route through Bützow station.

Once there were two mechanical interlockings but since 1992 signal box B has served only to control the level crossing barriers. Other functions were transferred up to 1972 to the Bützow signalling control centre, which started operations in 1970. In 1986/87, the Bad Kleinen–Schwaan and Bützow–Güstrow sections were electrified.

After the Peaceful Revolution, the facade of the station building was restored and the building made for sale. With the installation of modern platform displays, the remaining staff were withdrawn from the station in May 2009. The visual and audible passenger information systems have since been operated from Rostock.

== Passenger services ==
In the 2026 timetable the following lines stop at the station:

=== Long distance ===
Line	Route	Frequency
ICE 33	Ostseebad Binz/Greifswald – Stralsund – Rostock – Bützow – Schwerin – Hamburg – Hamburg-Altona	Every 2 hours
IC 57	(Warnemünde –) Rostock – Bützow – Schwerin – Stendal – Halle – Leipzig	2 train pairs

=== Regional services ===
Line	Route	Frequency
RE 1	Rostock – Bützow – Bad Kleinen – Schwerin – Büchen – Hamburg	Every 2 hours
RE 4	Lübeck – Bad Kleinen – Bützow – Güstrow – Neubrandenburg – Pasewalk – (Szczecin) or (Ueckermünde)	120 min (Lübeck–Bützow); 60 min (Bützow–Pasewalk); 120 min (Pasewalk–Szczecin)
RB 17	Rostock – Bützow – Bad Kleinen – Schwerin – Ludwigslust	2 pairs of trains (Mon–Fri)
RB 28	Ludwigslust – Schwerin – Bad Kleinen – Blankenberg – Bützow – Rostock	Some trains
