= Bundesstraße 106 =

Federal highway in Germany

B 106
- Bundesstraße 106

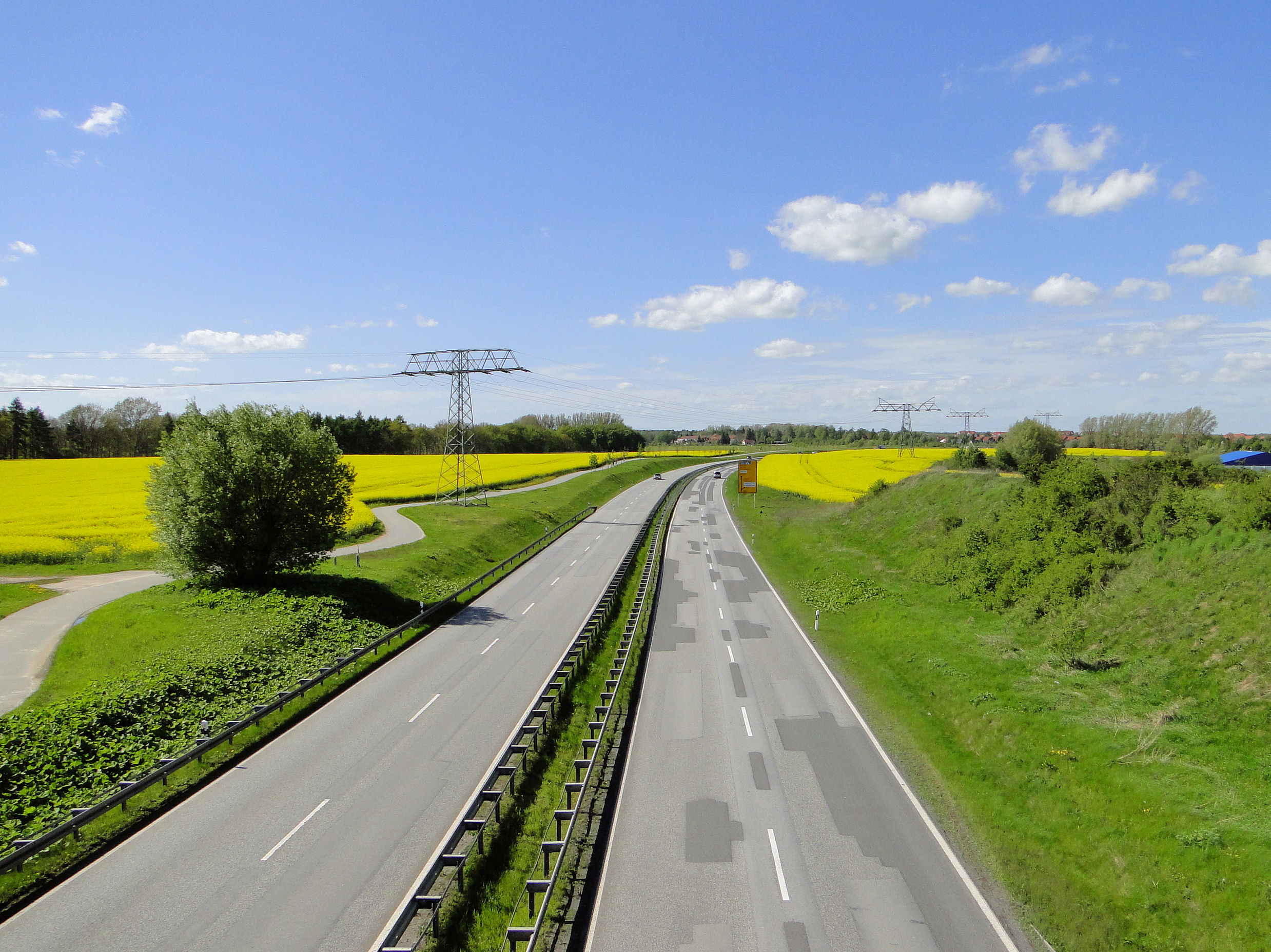

Route information
- Length: 40.7 km (25.3 mi)

Major junctions
- North end: Wismar
- B 105
- South end: Schwerin

Location
- Country: Germany
- States: Mecklenburg-Vorpommern

Highway system
- Roads in Germany; Autobahns; List; Federal; List; State; E-roads

Bundesstraße 106 (abbreviated B 106) is a German federal highway in Mecklenburg-Vorpommern, begins at the B 105 in Wismar and ends at the B 321 in Schwerin.

== History ==
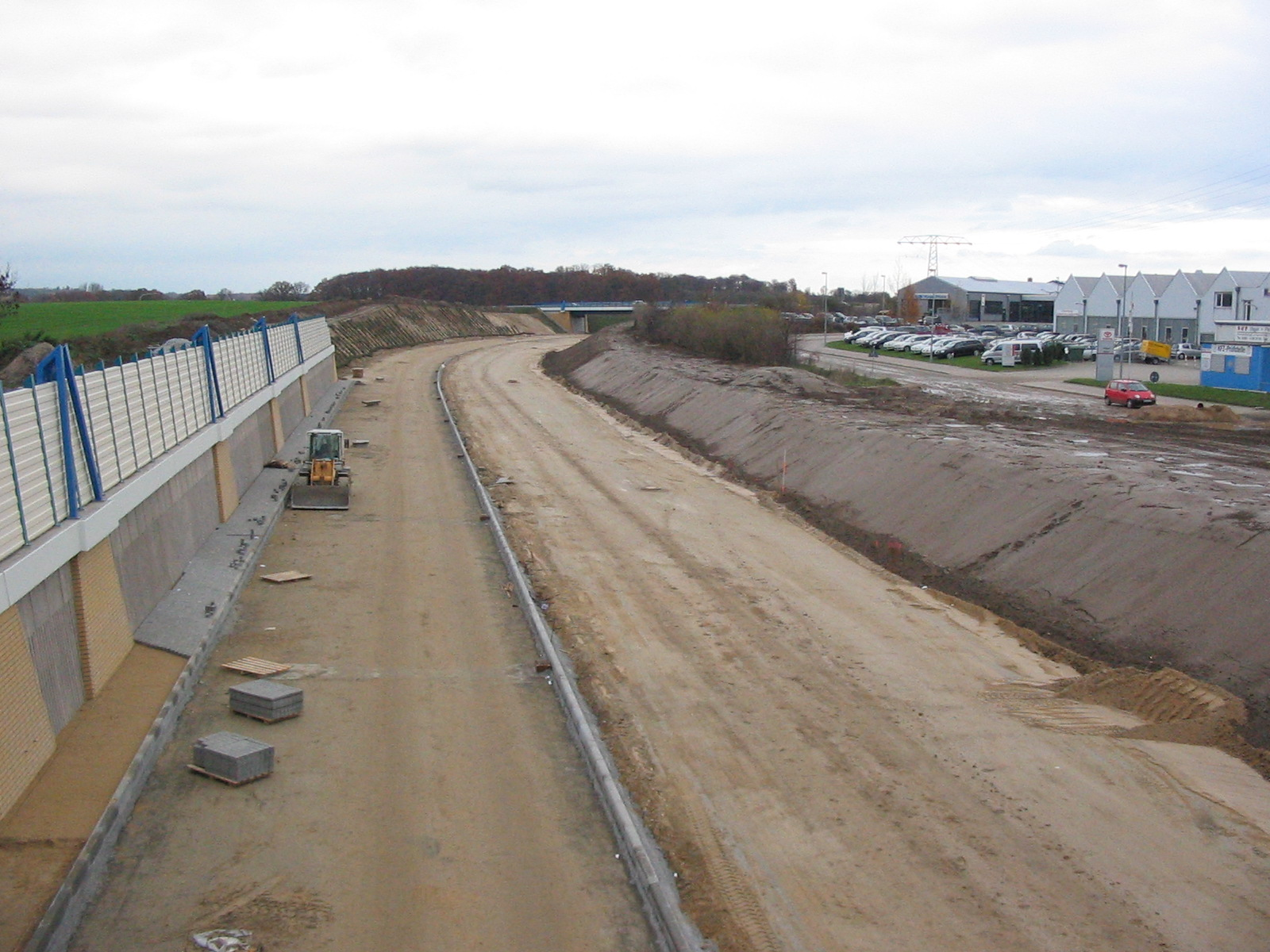
Building of the new Bundesstraße 106 in Schwerin

The road (Chaussee) between Wismar and Ludwigslust was built between 1830 and 1836. During the German Democratic Republic years the road was known as the Fernverkehrsstraße 106 (long distance route 106) (abbreviation F106).

Due to the Bundesautobahn 14 running directly parallel, the southern part of the road between Schwerin and Ludwigslust was downgraded to a Landesstraße (L72) starting in 2016.

== Junctions lists ==
Legend:

- I/C - Interchange, I/S - Intersection, RSA - Rest and service area, OBR - Overhead bridge restaurant, R/R - Restaurant and rest plaza, L/B - Layby, V/P - Vista point, TN - tunnel, T/P - Toll plaza, BR - Bridge
- C - Cloverleaf, S - Stack, T-A - Trumpet-A, T-B - Trumpet-B, DT - Directional-T/Y, SDT - Semi-Directional-T/Y, P-Y - Partial-Y, D - Diamond, P-C - Partial cloverleaf, D-D - Diverging diamond, D-R - Direct ramp

	Wismar
	B 105
	B 208
BR	Wallensteingraben
BR	A 20
	Dorf Mecklenburg
BR	Wallensteingraben
	Groß Stieten
	Niendorf
	Lübeck–Bad Kleinen railway
	Zickhusen
	Lübstorf
	Kirch Stück
	Schwerin-Nord B 104
BR	Aubach
	Schwerin
	Schwerin-Friedrichsthal/Lankow B 104
	Schwerin-Krebsförden/Wüstmark B 321
