= Lübstorf =

- Municipality
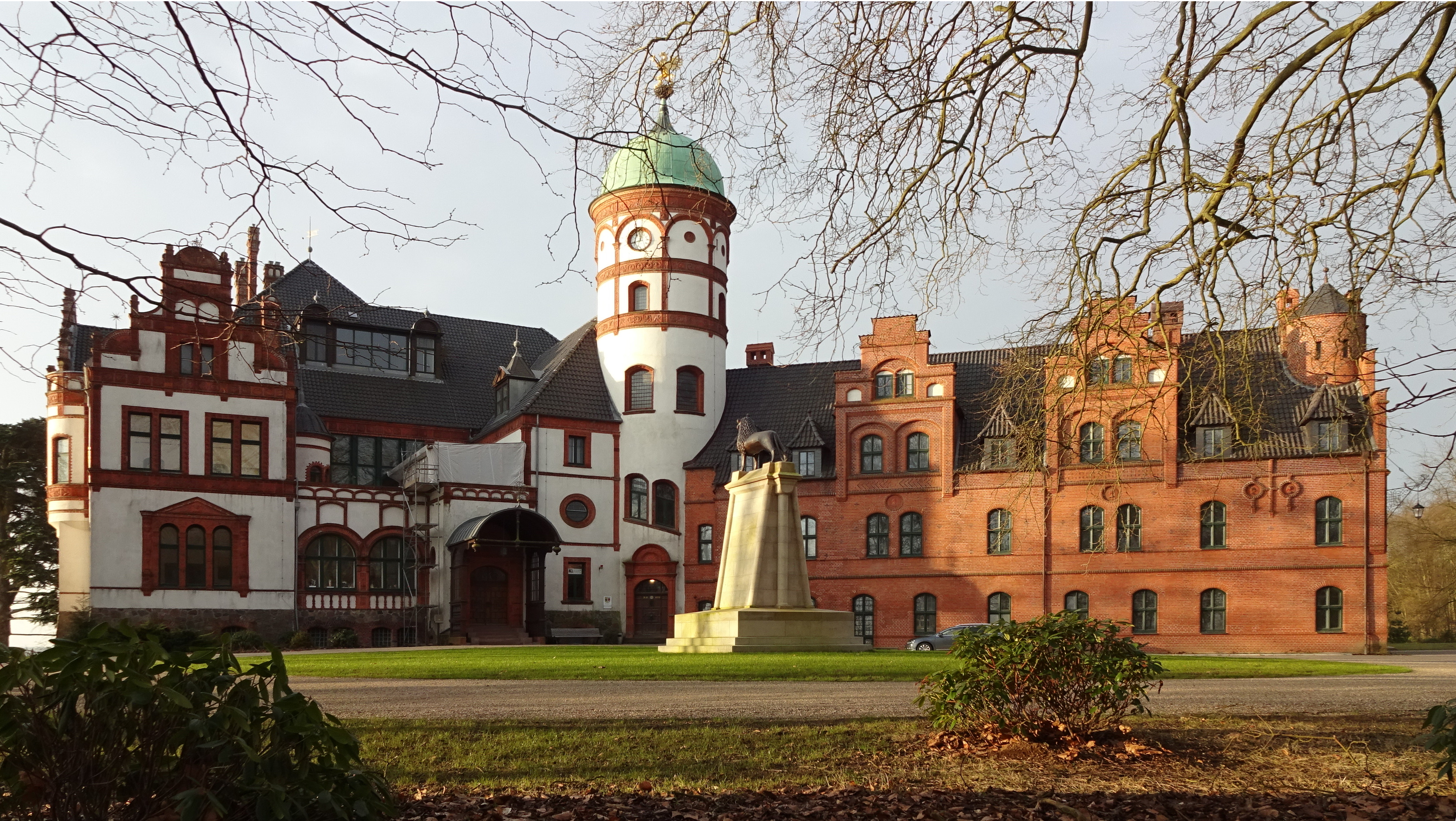
- Schloss Wiligrad in Lübstorf

- Location of Lübstorf within Nordwestmecklenburg district
- Interactive map of Lübstorf
- Location within Germany Location within Mecklenburg-Vorpommern
- Coordinates: 53°43′N 11°25′E
- Country: Germany
- State: Mecklenburg-Vorpommern
- District: Nordwestmecklenburg
- Municipal assoc.: Lützow-Lübstorf

Government
  - Mayor: Heinz Schmidt

Area
  - Total: 43.66 km^{2} (16.86 sq mi)
- Elevation: 40 m (130 ft)

Population (2025-12-31)
  - Total: 1,485
  - Density: 34.01/km^{2} (88.09/sq mi)
- Time zone: UTC+01:00 (CET)
  - Summer (DST): UTC+02:00 (CEST)
- Postal codes: 19069
- Dialling codes: 03867
- Vehicle registration: NWM

Lübstorf is a municipality in the Nordwestmecklenburg district, in Mecklenburg-Vorpommern, Germany.

It is close to the cities of Schwerin, Wismar, Lübeck and Rostock and is part of the Hamburg Metropolitan Region.

== Geography ==
Situated on the western shore of Lake Schwerin (Außensee), the municipality is only about 10 km from the city centre of Schwerin. The lake reaches its largest width of 5000 m at Lübstorf, the islands of Horst and Rethberg belong to the municipality. The terminal moraine, which extends along the western shore of Lake Schwerin, is bordered to the west by the Aubach valley. The municipality has a share in the Trebbow-Rugensee nature reserve.

== Districts ==
The districts of Neu Lübstorf, Rugensee and Wiligrad belong to Lübstorf.

== Economy and infrastructure ==
Lübstorf offers infrastructure for the municipality and the surrounding area in the form of a school, day nursery, pharmacy, medical practice and hotel as well as various shopping facilities. In 1994 a specialist clinic for psychosomatic illnesses and addictions was established in Lübstorf.

== Transport accessibility ==
The municipality is located on the B 106 from Schwerin to Wismar and has a railway station on the Ludwigslust-Wismar railway line. The junctions to the motorways A 20 and A 14 are 16 and 11 kilometres away respectively.
