= Bad Kleinen station =

Railway station in Germany

Bad Kleinen
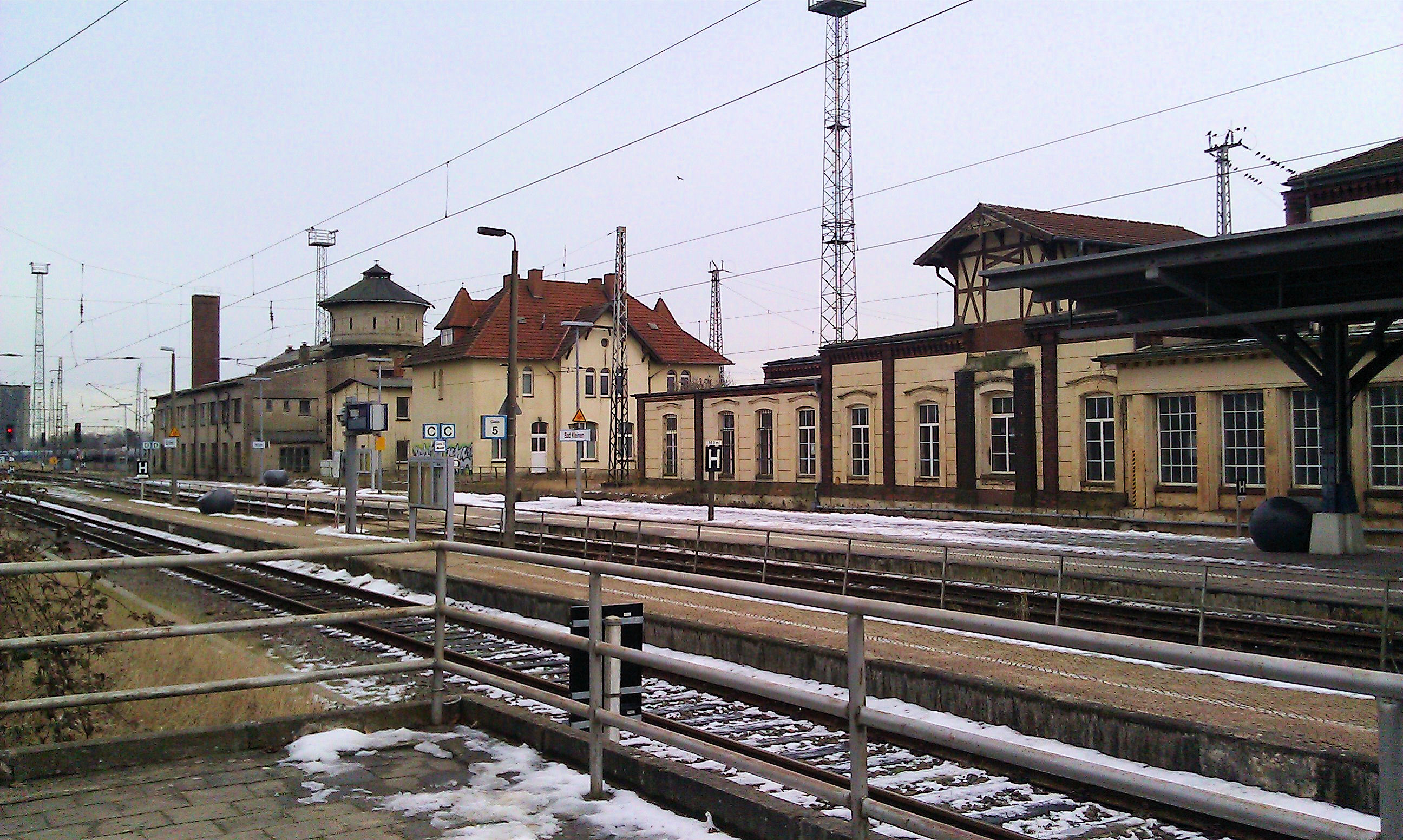
- Entrance and service buildings, rear engine shed, water tower (in 2012; demolished in 2017)

General information
- Location: Rosensteig 7, Bad Kleinen, MV; Germany
- Coordinates: 53°46′0″N 11°28′0″E
- Lines: Schwerin–Bad Kleinen–Wismar (KBS 204, KBS 100); Bad Kleinen–Rostock (KBS 100,KBS 175); Bad Kleinen–Lübeck (KBS 175)
- Platforms: 5

Construction
- Accessible: Yes

Other information
- Station code: 289
- DS100 code: WK
- IBNR: 8010018
- Category: 3
- Website: www.bahnhof.de

History
- Opened: 12 July 1848; 178 years ago
- Electrified: 12 April 1986; 40 years ago

Services
Preceding station	DB Fernverkehr	Following station
Schwerin Hbf towards Leipzig Hbf	IC 57	Bützow towards Warnemünde
Preceding station	DB Regio Nordost	Following station
Schwerin Hbf towards Hamburg Hbf	RE 1	Ventschow towards Rostock Hbf
Bobitz towards Bützow	RE 4	Ventschow towards Szczecin Główny or Ueckermünde Stadthafen
Moidentin towards Wismar	RB 17	Lübstorf towards Ludwigslust
Terminus	RB 18	Lübstorf towards Schwerin Hbf
Schwerin Hbf towards Ludwigslust	RB 28	Blankenberg (Meckl) towards Rostock Hbf
Preceding station	Ostdeutsche Eisenbahn	Following station
Dorf Mecklenburg towards Wismar	RE 8	Lübstorf towards Elsterwerda
Location

Bad Kleinen station is in the community of Bad Kleinen and is one of the oldest and most important railway stations in the Mecklenburg-Vorpommern, Germany. It primarily operates as a transfer station for traffic to and from Wismar, Grevesmühlen / Lübeck, Schwerin and Bützow / Güstrow / Rostock.

== History ==
The town of Kleinen (the prefix "Bad", meaning "Spa town", was awarded in 1915) was connected to the rail network in 1848, one year after the opening of the Hagenow Land–Schwerin railway, with the extension to Wismar. In planning the extension of the line from Schwerin to Rostock it was subsequently decided not to build the line directly from Schwerin, which would have required a crossing of Lake Schwerin. As a result, Kleinen became, after Hagenow Land, the second railway hub of Mecklenburg. In 1870, a line to Lübeck was opened via Grevesmühlen.

The station was rebuilt around 1920. Before that the “home” platforms were located next to the entrance building and other platforms were reached by crossing the tracks. During the rebuilding, island platforms were built on either side of the station building, which are reached by a tunnel.

In the first half of the 20th century, the most important routes through the station were the east–west route, Hamburg–Lübeck–Bad Kleinen–Bützow and continuing to Stettin (now Szczecin) and the route to the ferries in Warnemünde and Sassnitz. After the Second World War and the division of Germany passenger and freight traffic from the south of East Germany via Magdeburg–Wittenberg to Rostock and Wismar became particularly important for the station.

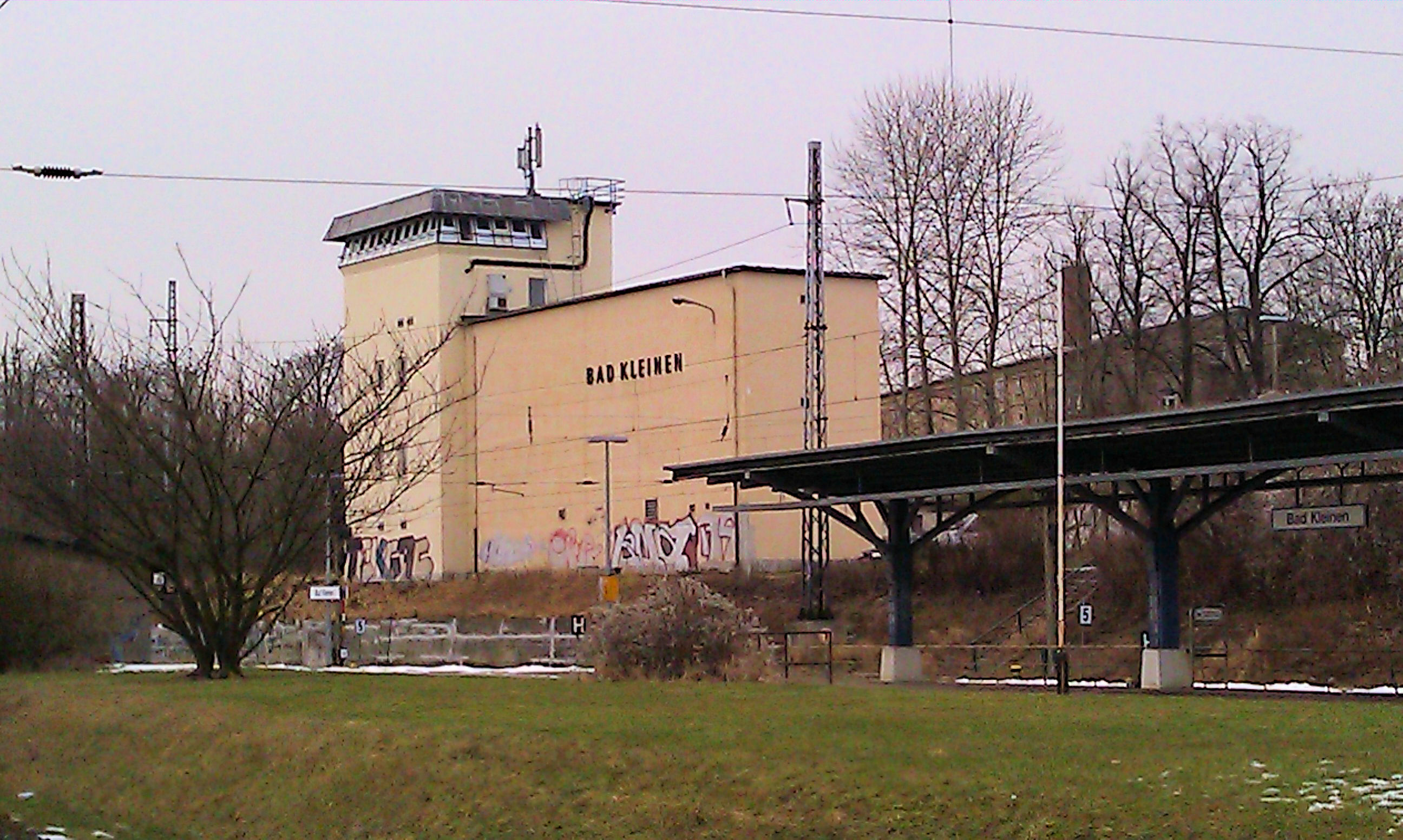
Signalling control centre

On 3 April 1975, the 300th relay interlocking in East Germany was put into operation in the station. It replaced several mechanical interlockings. In 1985, the railway station and the lines to Bützow–Rostock, Wismar and Schwerin–Magdeburg were electrified. On 12 April 1986, a celebration was held at the station for the 1000th km of line electrified since 1981 as part of the Free German Youth's “Youth Project" (Jugendobjekt). The memorial plaque was a victim of the changes that occurred in the early 1990s. The electrification of the Magdeburg region mainly served the export of potash through the port of Wismar.

The station is famous for the occasion in 1993 when the police tried to arrest Red Army Faction members Birgit Hogefeld and Wolfgang Grams. Grams and GSG-9 officer Michael Newrzella were shot and killed in a shootout on one of the platforms.

Since the timetable change in December 2008, nearly all intercity trains no longer stop at Bad Kleinen. Until that time, most long-distance trains running on the line through the station had stopped at it.

The track infrastructure (ballast bed and sleepers) at the station was renovated between 2011 and 2013. Since then, the station can be passed at 100 km/h. Work on the reconstruction of the station facilities began in autumn 2016. Barrier-free access and the construction of new platforms were planned. The station building, the engine shed and the other isolated buildings were completely demolished from January to March 2017. The demolition of the historic station ensemble disturbed the public. The renovations were completed in December 2018.

== Infrastructure ==
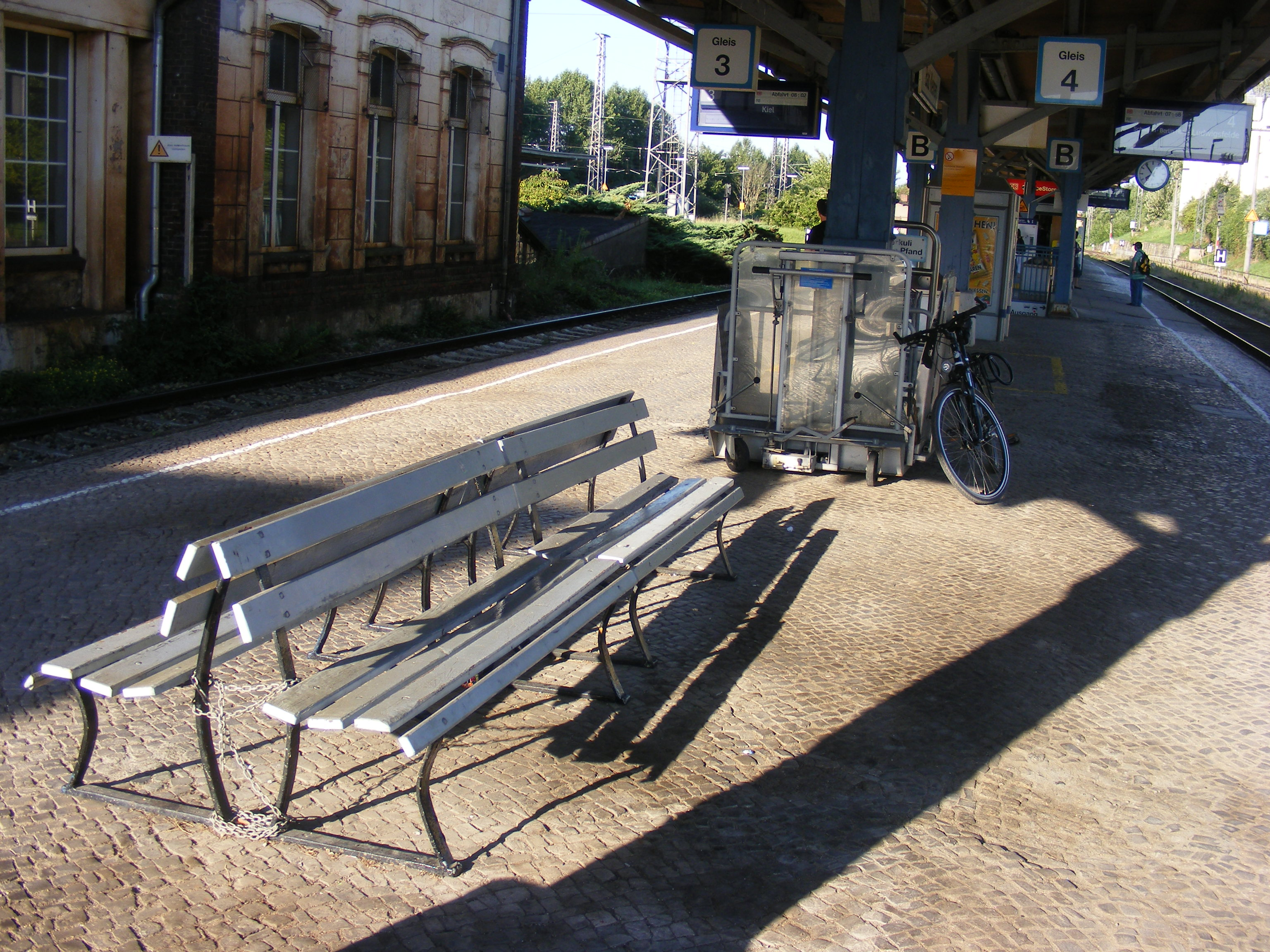
Bad Kleinen station, platform 3/4. (summer 2008)

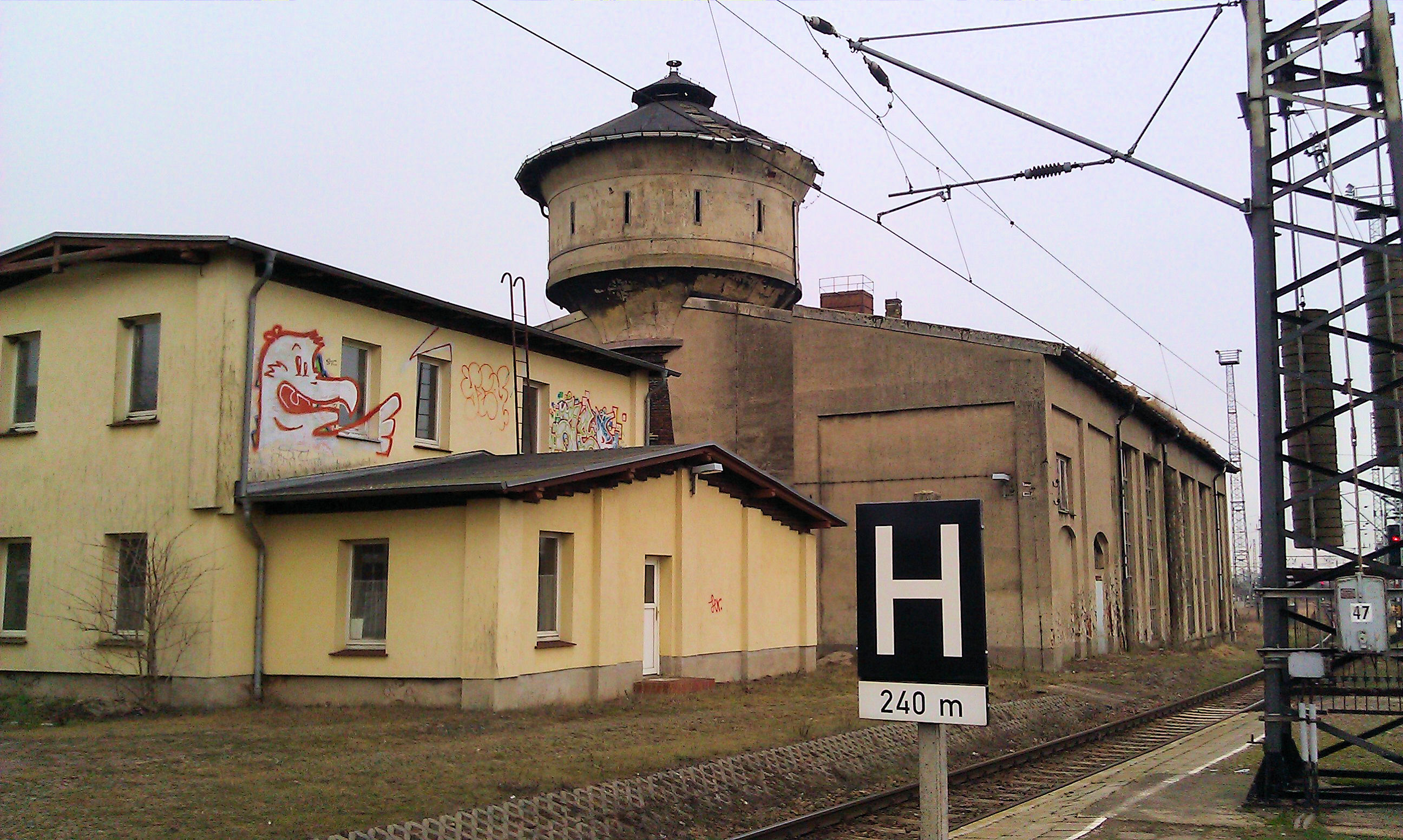
Railway building of 1880 with water tower and roundhouse

The station is an “island” station, situated between tracks. The station building is located between the two island platforms served by tracks 1/2 (especially serving traffic towards Wismar and Rostock) and 3/4. Platform track 5 is reached from platform 4. Tracks 3, 4 and 5 are used primarily for services towards Schwerin and Lübeck.

The station is located on a hillside between the town and Lake Schwerin. This has resulted in a structural feature: in the mid-1980s a footbridge was built to the station over the tracks from the forecourt to reach the first floor of the entrance building and there is a staircase inside the building to the ground floor.

There are no platforms next to the entrance building, all platforms are only accessible through a platform tunnel. There is no direct exit towards Lake Schwerin. The Eiertunnel (“egg tunnel”), which is located to the west of the station, gives pedestrian access to the lake.

The ticket office and the restaurant in the station building were closed in the 1990s and it is now only used for administration.

The entrance building and most buildings and structures at the station date back to the 19th century. This includes a building built in 1880, which contains a water tower and a roundhouse. The external platforms are virtually unchanged since the reconstruction in 1920.

=== Since the reconstruction in 2017 ===
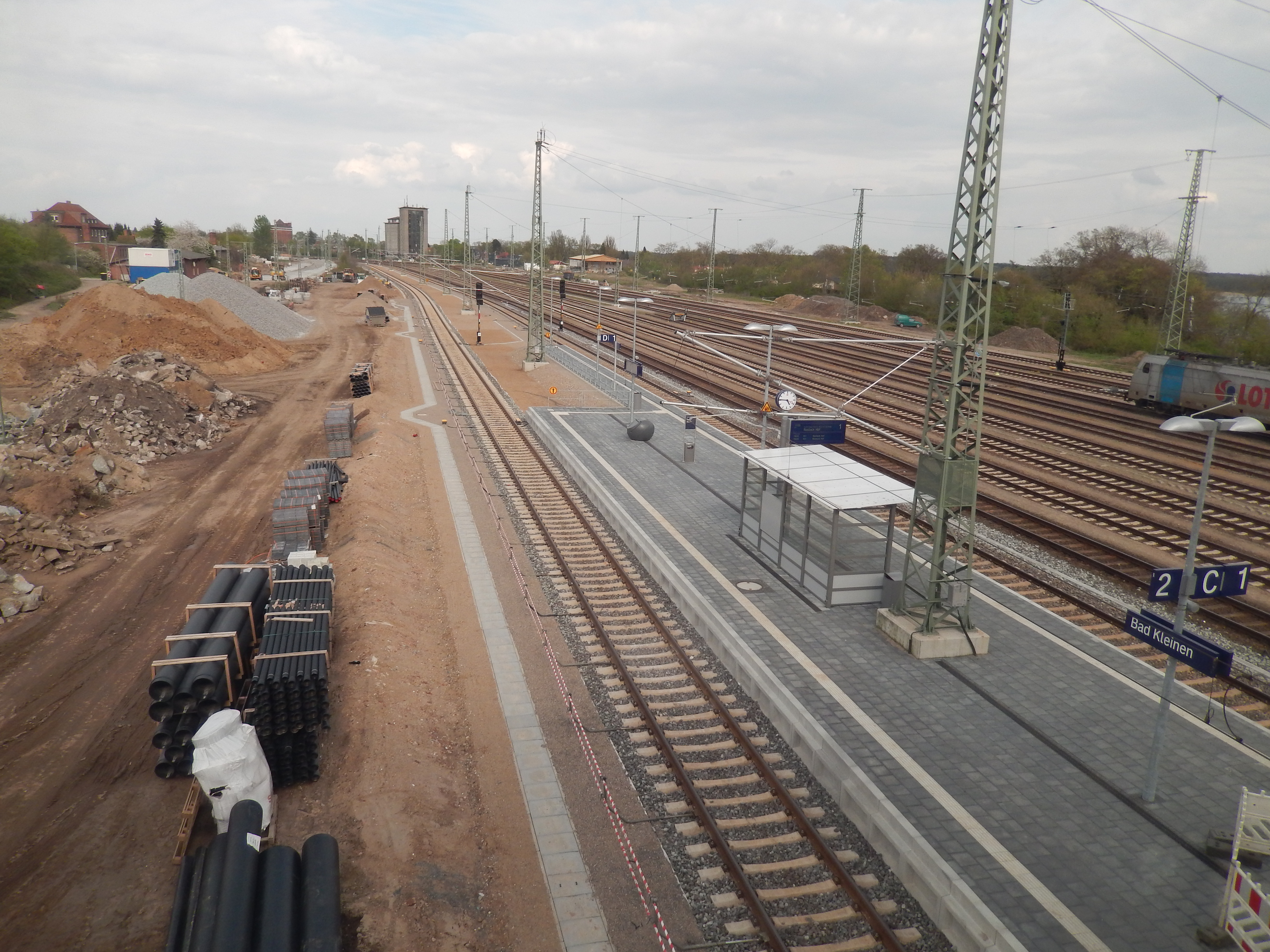
Platform in April 2018

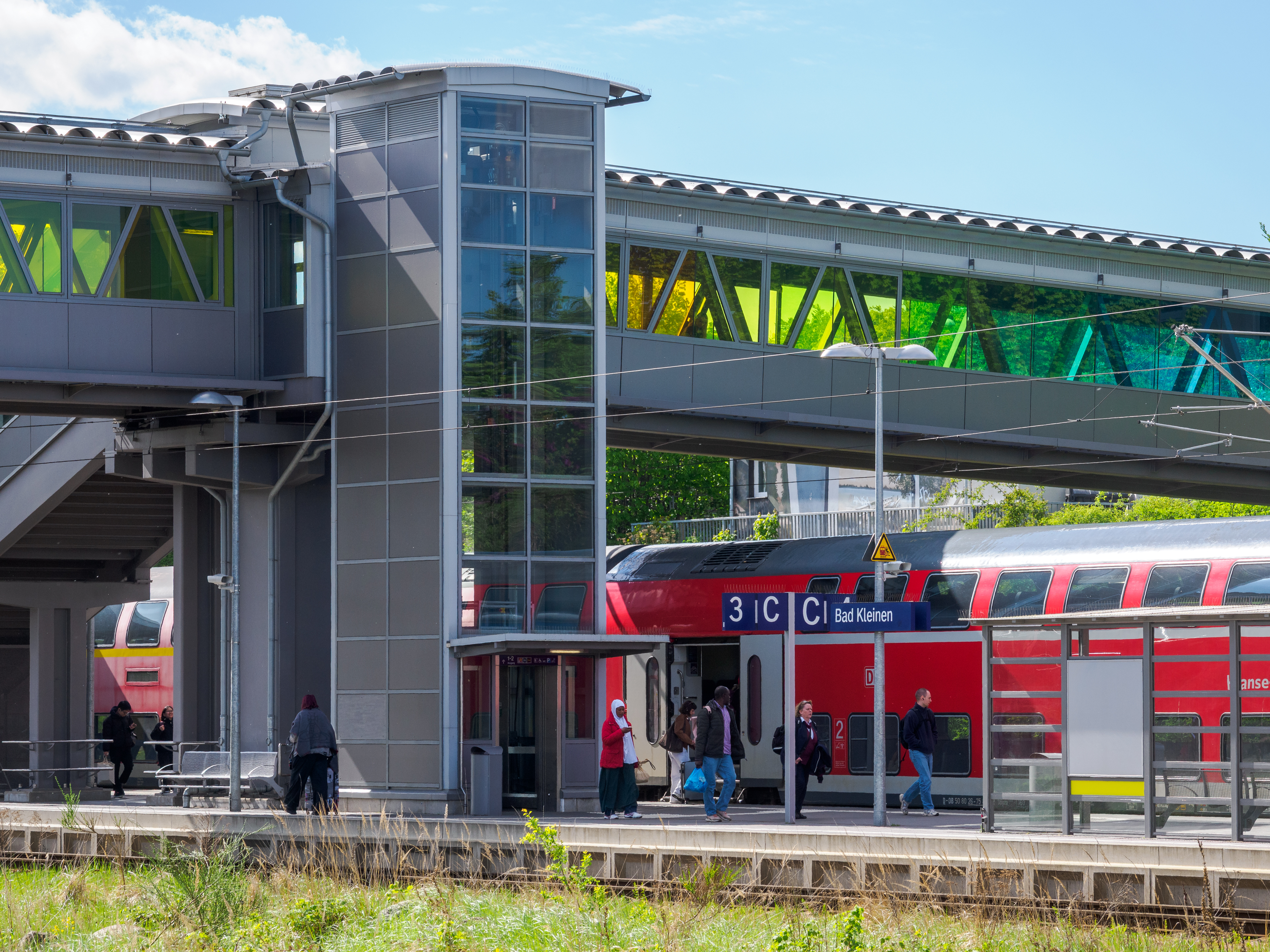
Platform bridge in 2026

Two island platforms remain after the renovation, which can be reached via a pedestrian bridge. Lifts connect the bridge to the platforms, which has allowed Deutsche Bahn to rate the station as barrier-free since 9 December 2018. Short sections of the island platforms are covered. There are no longer any catering facilities or toilets. Instead of the earlier buildings, there is an open space between the two platforms. A direct exit towards Lake Schwerin is still not planned.

== Train services ==
The station was served by the following services in 2026:

Line	Route	Frequency
IC 57	(Warnemünde –) Rostock – Bad Kleinen – Schwerin – Stendal – Halle – Leipzig	2 train pairs
RE 1	Rostock – Bützow – Blankenberg – Bad Kleinen – Schwerin – Hagenow Land – Hamburg	Every two hours with some additional trains between Rostock and Schwerin
RE 4	Lübeck – Bad Kleinen – Blankenberg – Bützow – Pasewalk – Szczecin / Ueckermünde	Hourly between Lübeck and Bad Kleinen, every two hours between Bad Kleinen and Bützow
RE 8	Wismar – Bad Kleinen – Schwerin – Ludwigslust – Wittenberge – Berlin – Potsdamer Platz – Südkreuz – Wünsdorf-Waldstadt – Elsterwerda	Every two hours
RB 17	Ludwigslust – Schwerin – Bad Kleinen – Wismar	Every two hours, one connection per hour in combination with RE 8
RB 18	Bad Kleinen – Schwerin	Every two hours
RB 28	Ludwigslust – Schwerin – Bad Kleinen – Bützow – Rostock	Some trains

Every two hours Regional-Express services on the Wismar–Berlin, Rostock–Hamburg, and Bad Kleinen–Lübeck routes in both directions stop in the station simultaneously and connections can be made in all directions.
