= Lübstorf station =

Railway station in Lübstorf, Germany

Lübstorf
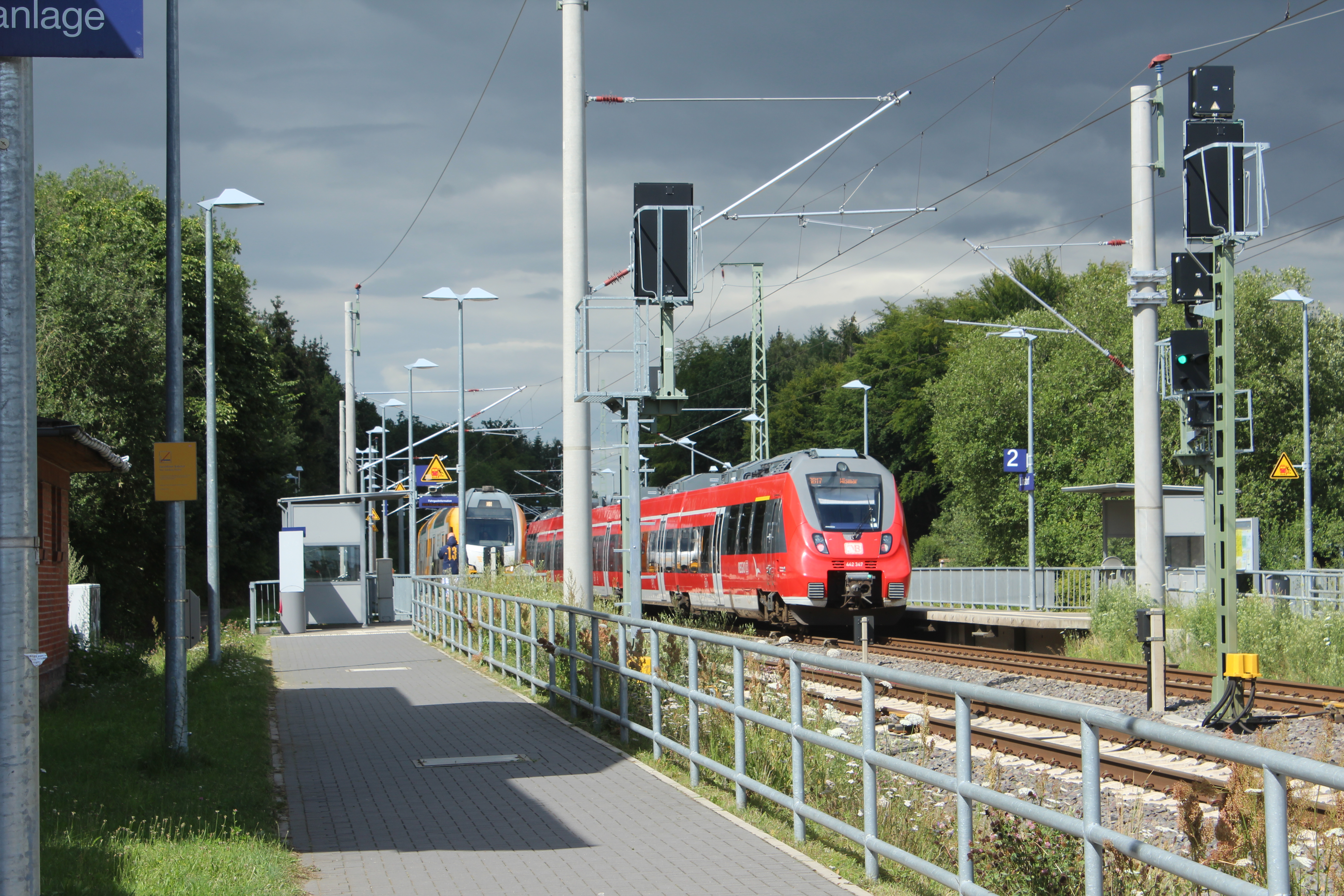
- 2020

General information
- Location: Bahnhofstraße 20; 19069 Lübstorf; Mecklenburg-Vorpommern; Germany
- Coordinates: 53°43′45″N 11°24′41″E
- Owner: Deutsche Bahn
- Operator: DB Station&Service
- Lines: Ludwigslust–Wismar railway (KBS 202)
- Platforms: 2 side platforms
- Tracks: 2
- Train operators: DB Regio Nordost; ODEG

Construction
- Parking: yes
- Cycle facilities: yes
- Accessible: yes

Other information
- Station code: 3819
- DS100 code: WLST
- IBNR: 8012264
- Category: 6
- Website: www.bahnhof.de

History
- Electrified: 30 May 1987; 39 years ago

Services
Preceding station	DB Regio Nordost	Following station
Bad Kleinen towards Wismar	RB 17	Schwerin Hbf towards Ludwigslust
Bad Kleinen Terminus	RB 18	Schwerin Hbf Terminus
Preceding station	Ostdeutsche Eisenbahn	Following station
Bad Kleinen towards Wismar	RE 8	Schwerin Hbf towards Elsterwerda
Location
- Location within Mecklenburg-Vorpommern Location within Germany Location within Europe

Lübstorf station is a railway station in the municipality of Lübstorf, located in the Nordwestmecklenburg district in Mecklenburg-Vorpommern, Germany.

== Notable places nearby ==
- Lake Schwerin
