= Lübeck–Bad Kleinen railway =

Railway line in Germany

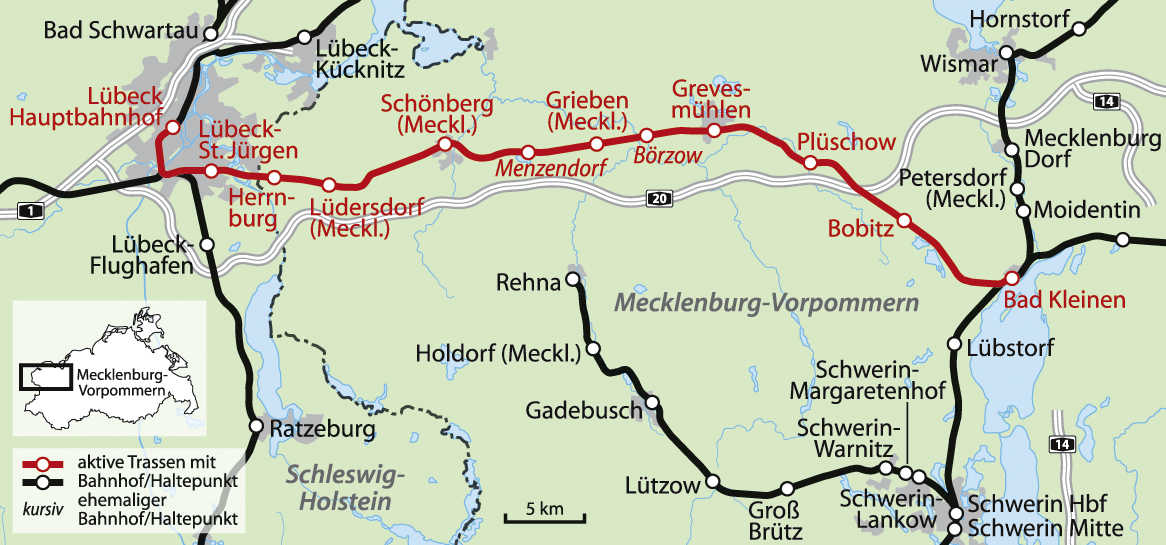

Overview
- Line number: 1122
- Locale: Mecklenburg-Vorpommern and Schleswig-Holstein, Germany

Service
- Route number: 175 (DR: 782)

Technical
- Line length: 61.9 km (38.5 mi)
- Track gauge: 1,435 mm (4 ft 8 1/2 in) standard gauge

The Lübeck–Bad Kleinen railway is a single-track, non-electrified main line between the German states of Schleswig-Holstein and Mecklenburg-Vorpommern. Its construction was started by the Lübeck-Kleinen Railway Company (German: Lübeck-Kleinener Eisenbahn-Gesellschaft) and, after that company's bankruptcy, it was completed and opened by the Friedrich-Franz Railway (Friedrich-Franz-Eisenbahn).

== Operation and history ==
In the 1850s, the two grand duchies of Mecklenburg-Schwerin and Mecklenburg-Strelitz were planning an east–west route through their territory. This would connect in Lübeck to the Lübeck–Büchen line with Kleinen on the Hagenow–Wismar line and run over the existing Bad Kleinen–Rostock railway to Bützow and continue to Güstrow and Neubrandenburg. From there it would run via Strasburg over the modern Polish border to Szczecin (then called Stettin). While the middle section was intended to be a state railway, the western section from Bad Kleinen to Lübeck would be built and operated by a private company.

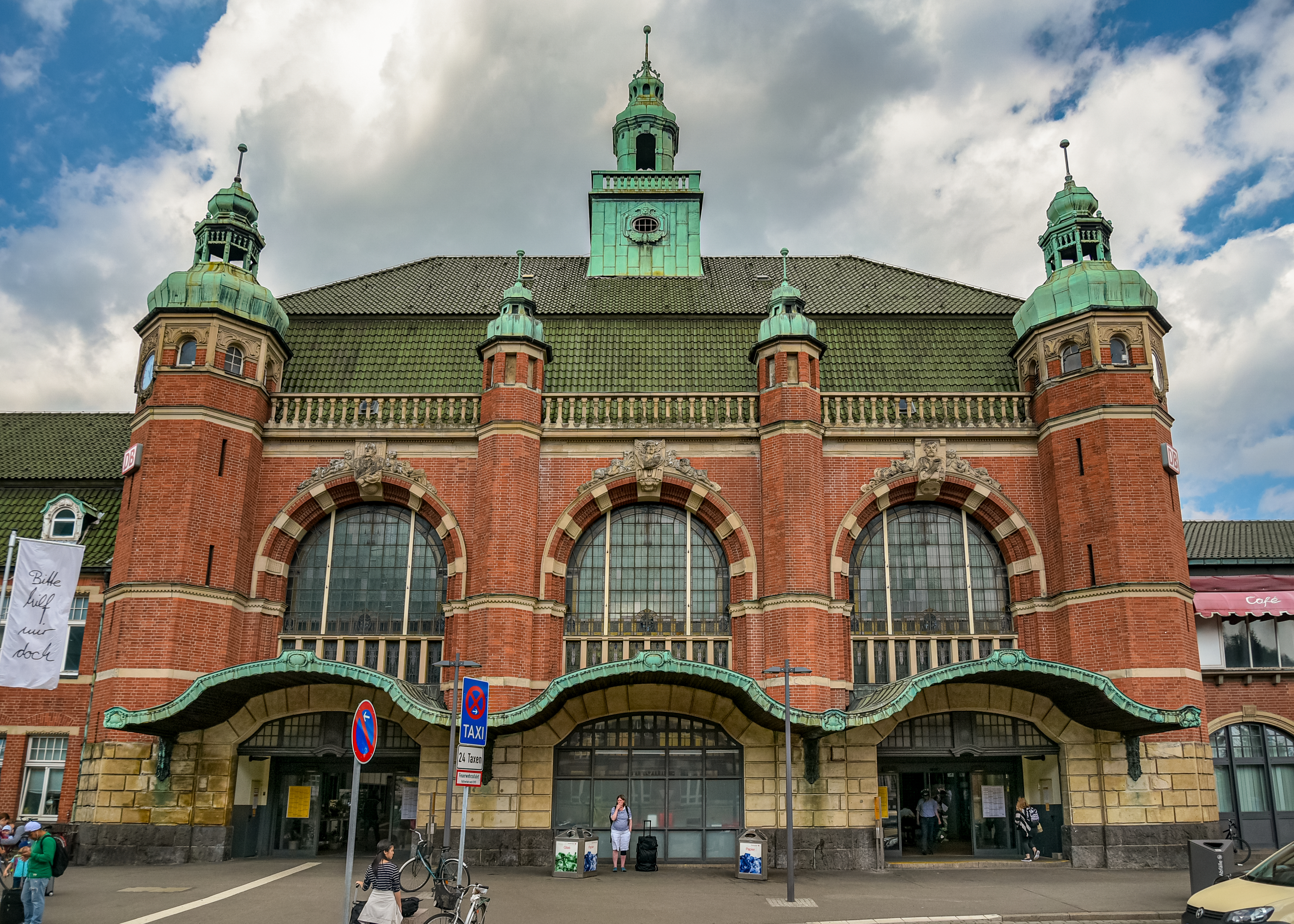
Lübeck Central Station

The newly established Lübeck-Kleinen Railway Company was commissioned in 1865 to construct the line. This was planned to be completed by 1867. However, there was a delay in construction, as the route was changed several times by the company, and it was ultimately not financially able to complete the line. Following its liquidation, the Friedrich-Franz Railway took over and finished construction of the line in 1870. On 1 July 1870, the first train ran over the nearly 60 kilometre-long route.

=== 1870–1945 ===
The line was initially not of great importance. In 1885, only a few passenger trains per day in ran in either direction. Its best days were in the early 20th century. The railways in Lübeck were reorganised in 1907/08 and Lübeck Central Station (Hauptbahnhof) was opened as the city's main station. The concentration of all the lines through the central station allowed through trains to run from Hamburg via Lübeck, Bad Kleinen and Neubrandenburg to Stettin. The line was listed until the Second World War as line 118 in the German railway timetable. It was of great significance for the ferries to Scandinavia through Warnemünde and Sassnitz.

=== 1945–1989 ===
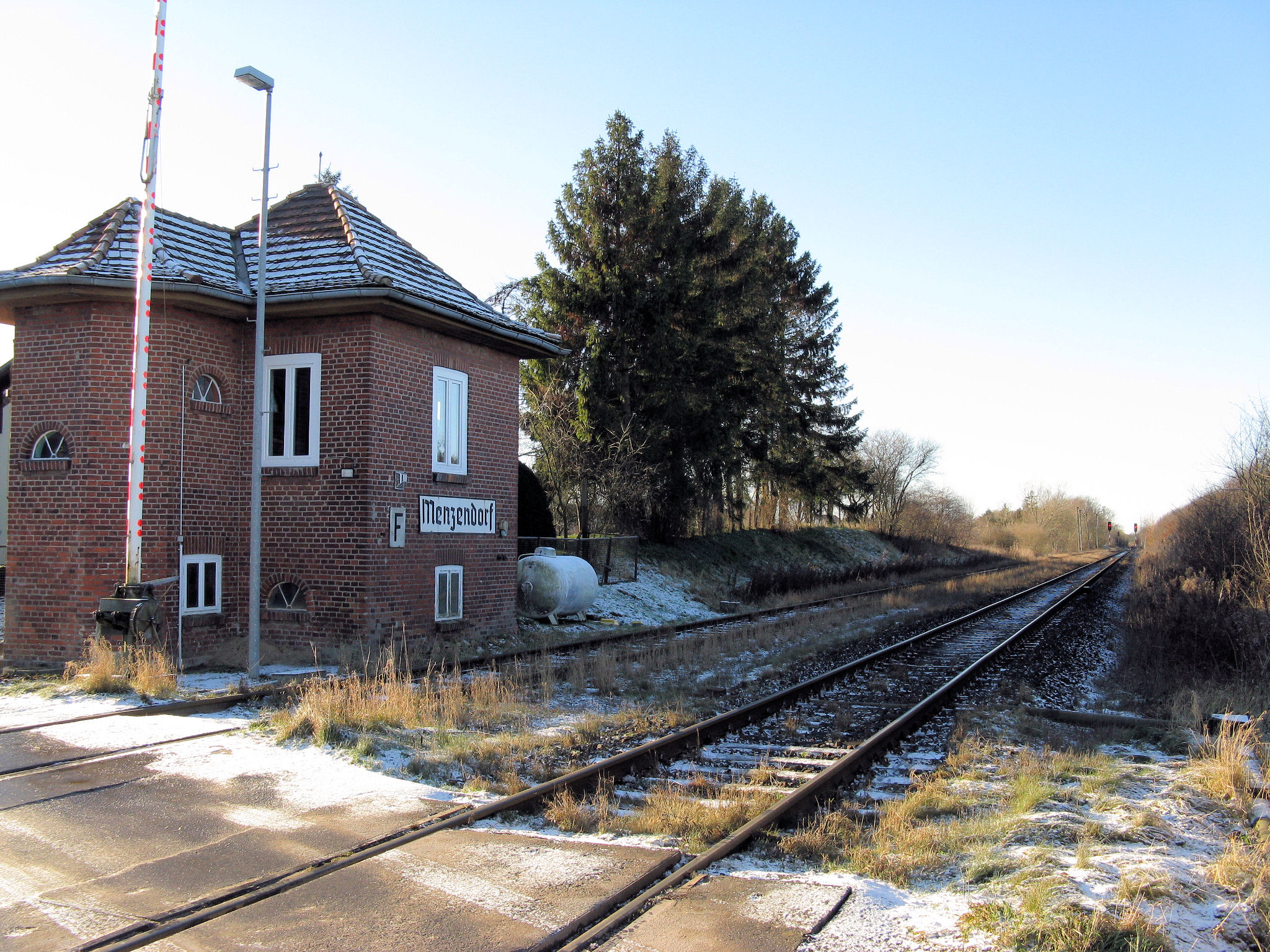
Level crossing and signalbox in Menzendorf

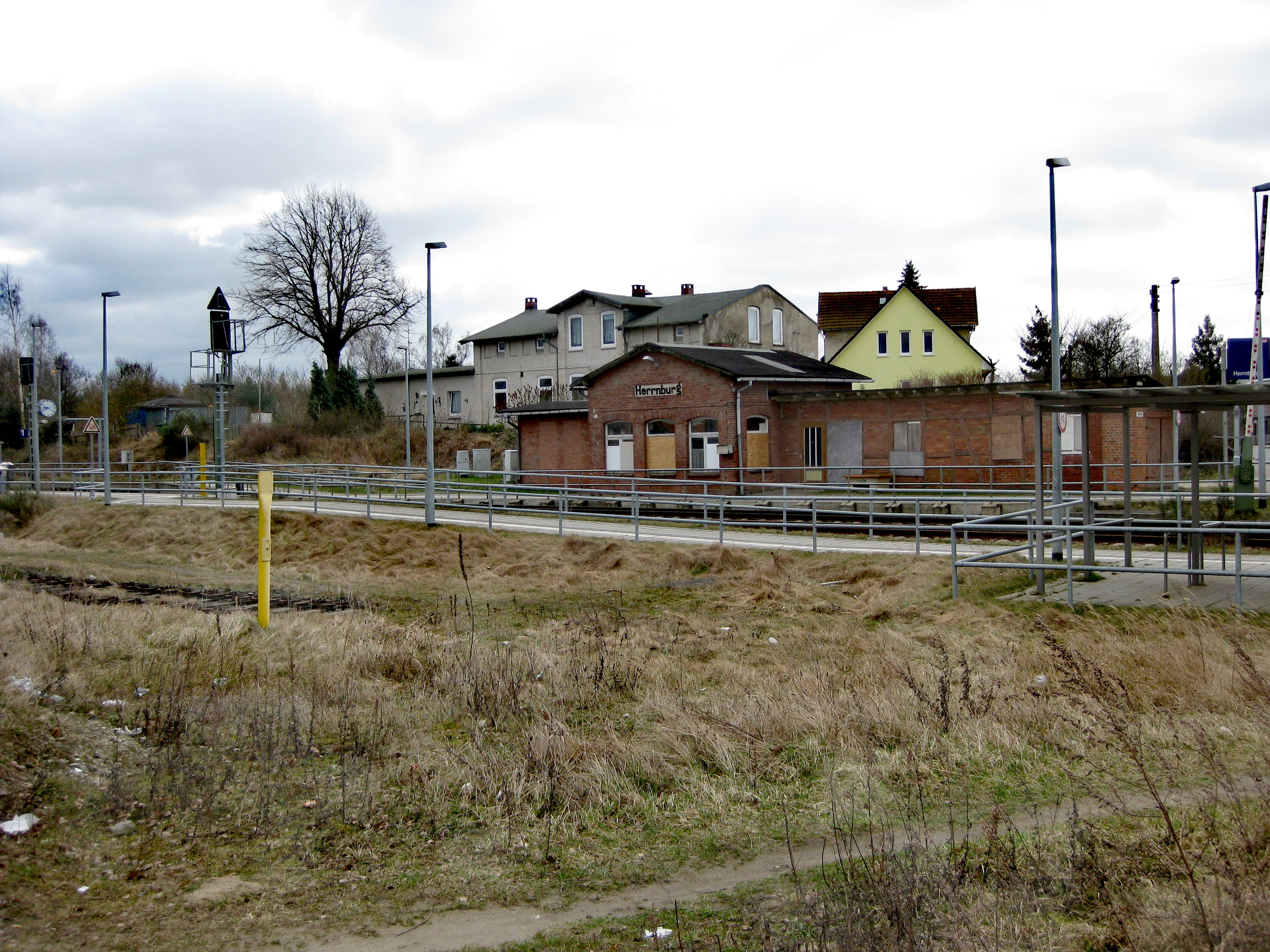
Herrnburg station

After 1945, through-traffic on the line ended because the border between the British and the Soviet occupation zone was just east of Lübeck. The second track was dismantled for reparations to the Soviet Union. After a brief resurgence of rail traffic from 1952 to 1960, traffic across the border between the Federal Republic (West Germany) and the GDR (East Germany) was discontinued. After 20 March 1960, some freight trains and interzonal trains (Interzonenzug) ran between Hamburg and Rostock via Lübeck. The exact route of the trains changed several times over the years. In the early years, trains continued to Sassnitz, connecting to the ferry to Sweden. Even then, the train often went via Stralsund. At times through coaches ran to Neubrandenburg. In the last years before the fall of the Wall, trains ran from Cologne via Hamburg to Rostock. During holidays there were additional relief trains.

The control of passengers travelling across the interzonal boundary, which was carried out by the border organisation of the GDR, took place at Herrnburg station and on trains running between Herrnburg and Bad Kleinen. While passengers passed through the controls at Herrnburg, the trains stayed at the platform. Passengers who left the train here to continue their journey on a train towards Grevesmühlen were handled in a separate control area. This continued until the 1970s, using old two-axle passenger carriages that were parked on the opposite track.

While on the West German side to the border there were no stations and therefore no rail services, on the eastern side regional services operated on the Herrnburg–Bad Kleinen section (in 1989 there were five pairs of trains from Herrnburg and eight from Grevesmühlen).

In the second half of the 1980s, trains operated on the line for local border traffic (Kleiner Grenzverkehr, a system under which West Germans from nearby areas were allowed to cross the border for up to 30 days a year and 9 days a quarter, one day at a time) and a pair of express trains was added between Lübeck and Schwerin at weekends. After the East German government eased some of travel restrictions and more GDR citizens were able to travel to the West in May 1989, an additional pair of trains ran on the Güstrow–Hamburg route. For a few years a corridor express (D-Zug) train ran from Cologne to Rostock (only in this direction), stopping in Grevesmühlen.

=== Since 1989 ===
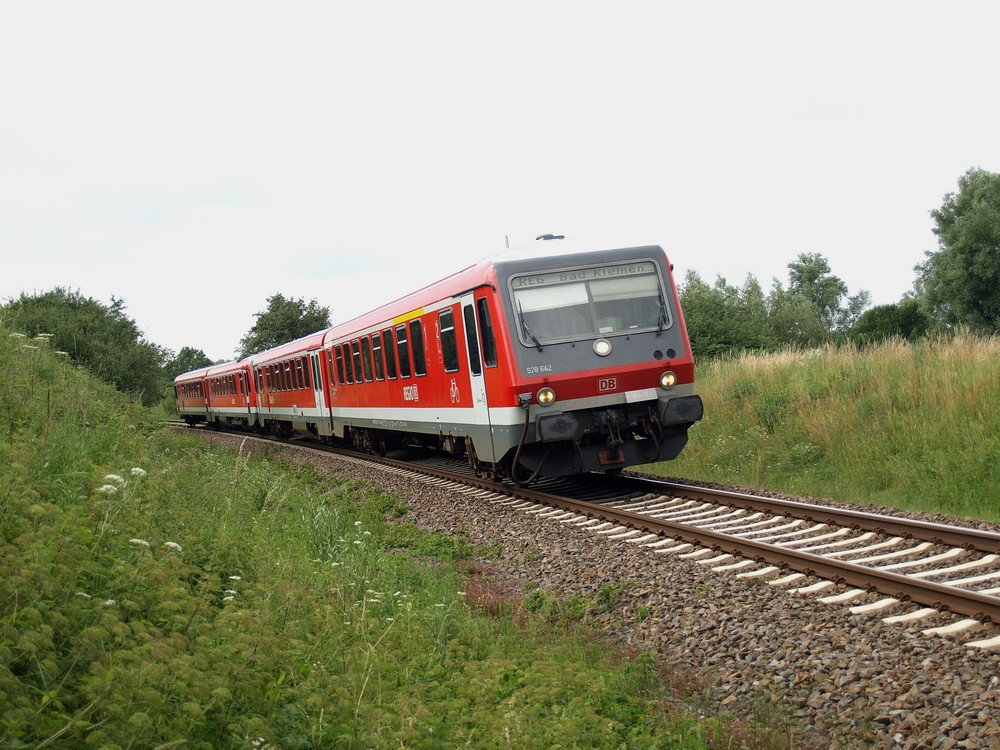
BR628 coupled set near Bobitz

After the fall of the Berlin Wall, there was more traffic on this line than it could handle. After German reunification, the line therefore became part of the German Unity Transport Project (Verkehrsprojekte Deutsche Einheit) No. 1. This provided for the upgrade of the Lübeck–Rostock–Stralsund line for a speed of 160 km/h, but there would still be only one track to Bad Kleinen. The upgrade has been slow and is not yet finished.

The importance of the line since the mid-1990s, when two long-distance services (Stralsund–Rostock–Hamburg and Berlin/Leipzig–Lübeck–Kiel) operated every two hours, has decreased markedly. First, the trains between Rostock and Hamburg now run on the route via Schwerin and Büchen and, on the other hand, the Lübeck–Leipzig InterRegio line was abandoned in 2001. Since then the line has only been served by regional services.

Lübeck-St. Jürgen station was opened on 15 December 2002. It opens up a part of southern Lübeck in the district of St. Jürgen.

Currently the following services operate on the line:

Line	Category	Route
RE 4	Regional-Express	Lübeck – Bad Kleinen – Güstrow – Neubrandenburg – Szczecin
RE 4	Regional-Express	Lübeck – Schönberg – Grevesmühlen – Bad Kleinen

Both Regional-Express lines run every two hours, so on the Lübeck–Bad Kleinen section there are services every hour. The RE4 running on the Lübeck–Bad Kleinen route stops at Lübeck-St. Jürgen, Herrnburg, Schönberg and Grevesmühlen, while the RE4 running on the Lübeck–Bad Kleinen–Stettin route stops at all stations on the Lübeck–Bad Kleinen section. Since October 2015, class 623 diesel railcars (LINT 41) have been used on the line. Previously, the trains were operated with locomotives of class 218, hauling Silberling carriages and diesel multiple units of class 628.

A future upgrade and electrification of the line is under discussion.
