= Marianne Grunthal =

German teacher (1896–1945)

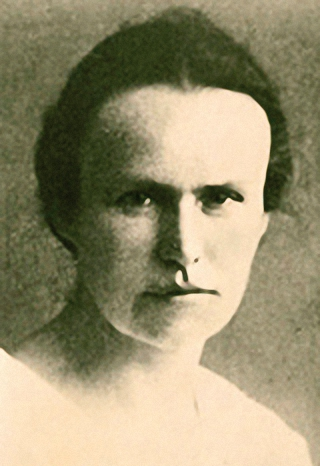
Marianne Grunthal

Marianne Grunthal (31 January 1896 – 2 May 1945, Schwerin) was a German teacher who was executed under the Nazi regime for expressing her wish for peace.

Grunthal was born in Zehdenick, Province of Brandenburg. In 1945, after having heard the news of Hitler's death, she had called out aloud with relief, "Gott sei Dank, dann ist der furchtbare Krieg endlich zu Ende". (English: "Thank god, then this terrible war will be over at last", different version: "Thank God, then there will be peace".) She was heard by SS guards who were on their way to bring prisoners from Ravensbrück and Sachsenhausen concentration camps on so-called death marches towards the west. For having spoken this single sentence, Grunthal was hanged by SS men on 2 May 1945 on the Schwerin Central Station square – only hours before American troops entered the city.

Today, the station square is named after Marianne Grunthal, as is a street in Zehdenick. The lamp post on which she was hanged is still standing, bearing a memorial plaque.

Her grave is situated on the Nordfriedhof (Northern cemetery) in the City of Zehdenick (State of Brandenburg).

== Sources ==
- Hauff, Irmgard: "Der Wunsch nach Frieden brachte den Tod : Marianne Grunthal – gemordet am 2. Mai ´45." – In: Mecklenburg-Magazin / Regionalbeilage der Schweriner Volkszeitung. – Schwerin (29 April 2005), Nr. 17, S. 23.
- City of Schwerin: Landeshauptstadt picture of the Grunthalplatz
- University of Erlangen, Germany Johnsons JAHRESTAGE – Der Kommentar – 02.04.1968
