= Pfaffenteich =

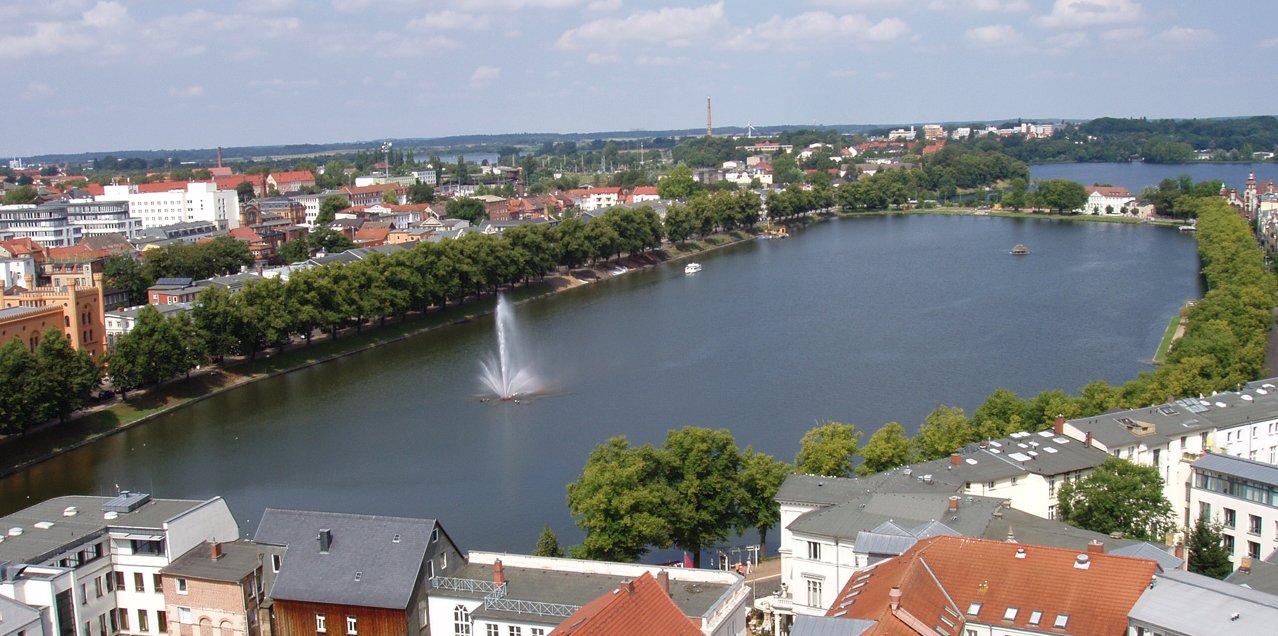

- Location within Mecklenburg-Vorpommern
- Location: Schwerin, Mecklenburg-Vorpommern
- Coordinates: 53°38′1″N 11°24′45″E
- Type: artificial lake
- Primary inflows: Aubach
- Basin countries: Germany
- Surface area: 0.123 km^{2} (0.047 sq mi)
- Average depth: 2.8 m (9 ft 2 in)
- Max. depth: 4.4 m (14 ft)
- Shore length^{1}: 1.639 km (1.018 mi)
- Surface elevation: 39.2 m (129 ft)
- Settlements: Schwerin
- ^{1} Shore length is not a well-defined measure.

Pfaffenteich is a pond in Schwerin, Mecklenburg-Vorpommern, Germany. At an elevation of 39.2 m, its surface area is 12.3 hectares (30 acres).
