= Aubach (at Schwerin) =

River in Germany

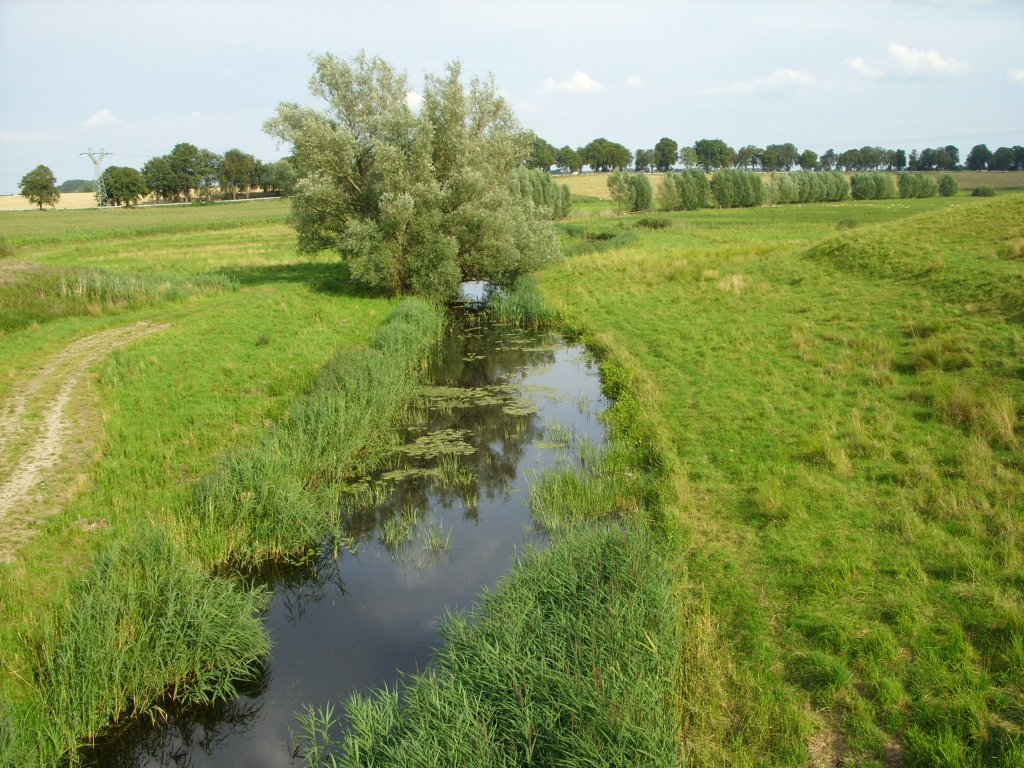

Location
- Country: Germany
- State: Mecklenburg-Vorpommern

Physical characteristics
- Mouth
  - location: Pfaffenteich
  - coordinates: 53.7881°N 11.3895°E

Basin features
- Progression: Stör→ Elde→ Elbe→ North Sea

The Aubach is a river of Mecklenburg-Vorpommern, Germany. It flows into the Pfaffenteich, which is drained by the Stör, in Schwerin.

== See also ==
- List of rivers of Mecklenburg-Vorpommern
