= Stör (Elde) =

River in Germany

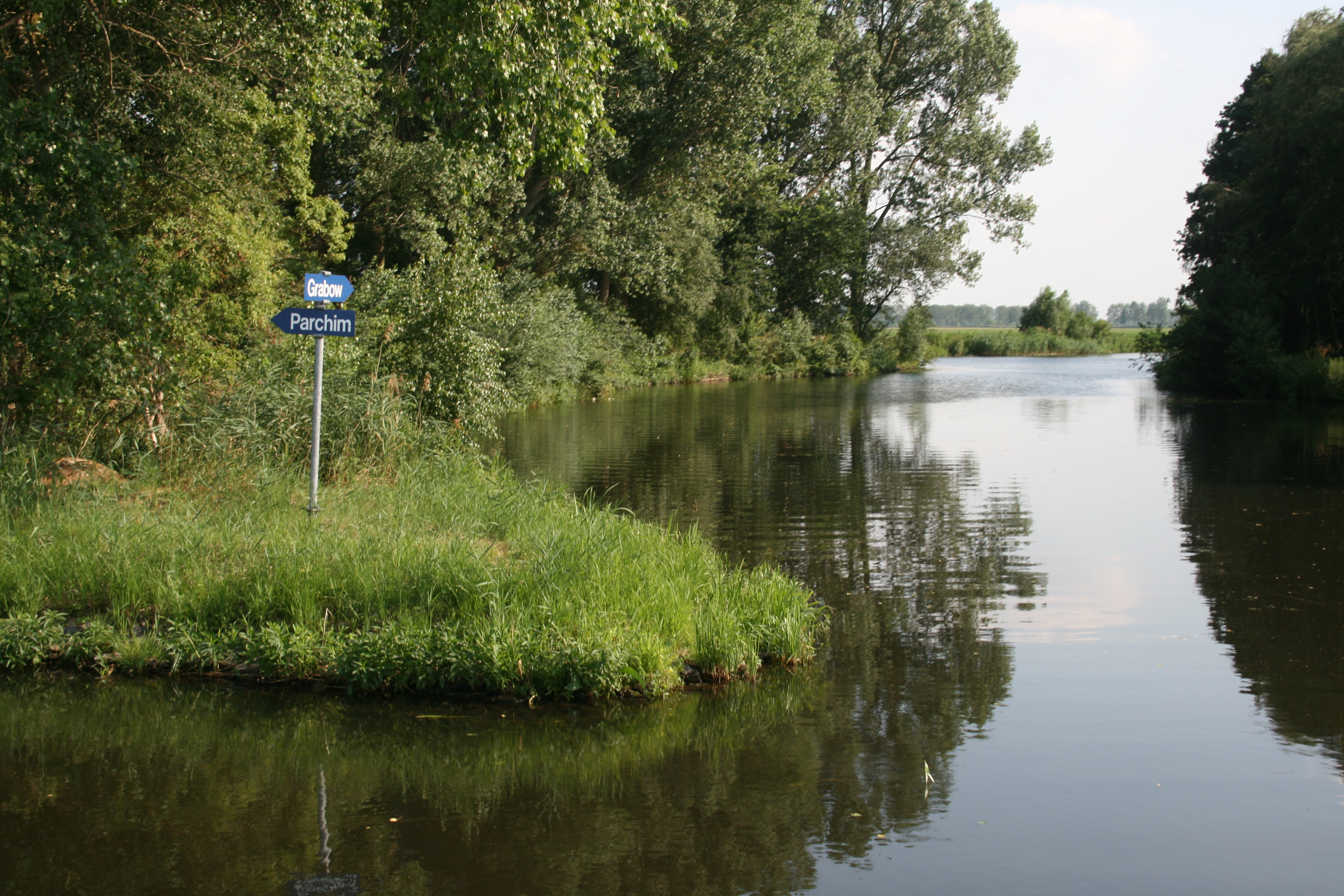

Location
- Country: Germany
- State: Mecklenburg-Vorpommern

Physical characteristics
- Mouth
  - location: Elde
  - coordinates: 53.4623°N 11.6401°E

Basin features
- Progression: Elde→ Elbe→ North Sea

The Stör is a river of Mecklenburg-Vorpommern, Germany. It is the natural outflow of Lake Schwerin, towards the south. The canalized part south of Banzkow is called Störkanal. It flows into the Elde near Neustadt-Glewe.

== See also ==
- List of rivers of Mecklenburg-Vorpommern
