= Schwerin Hauptbahnhof =

Railway station in Germany

Schwerin Hbf
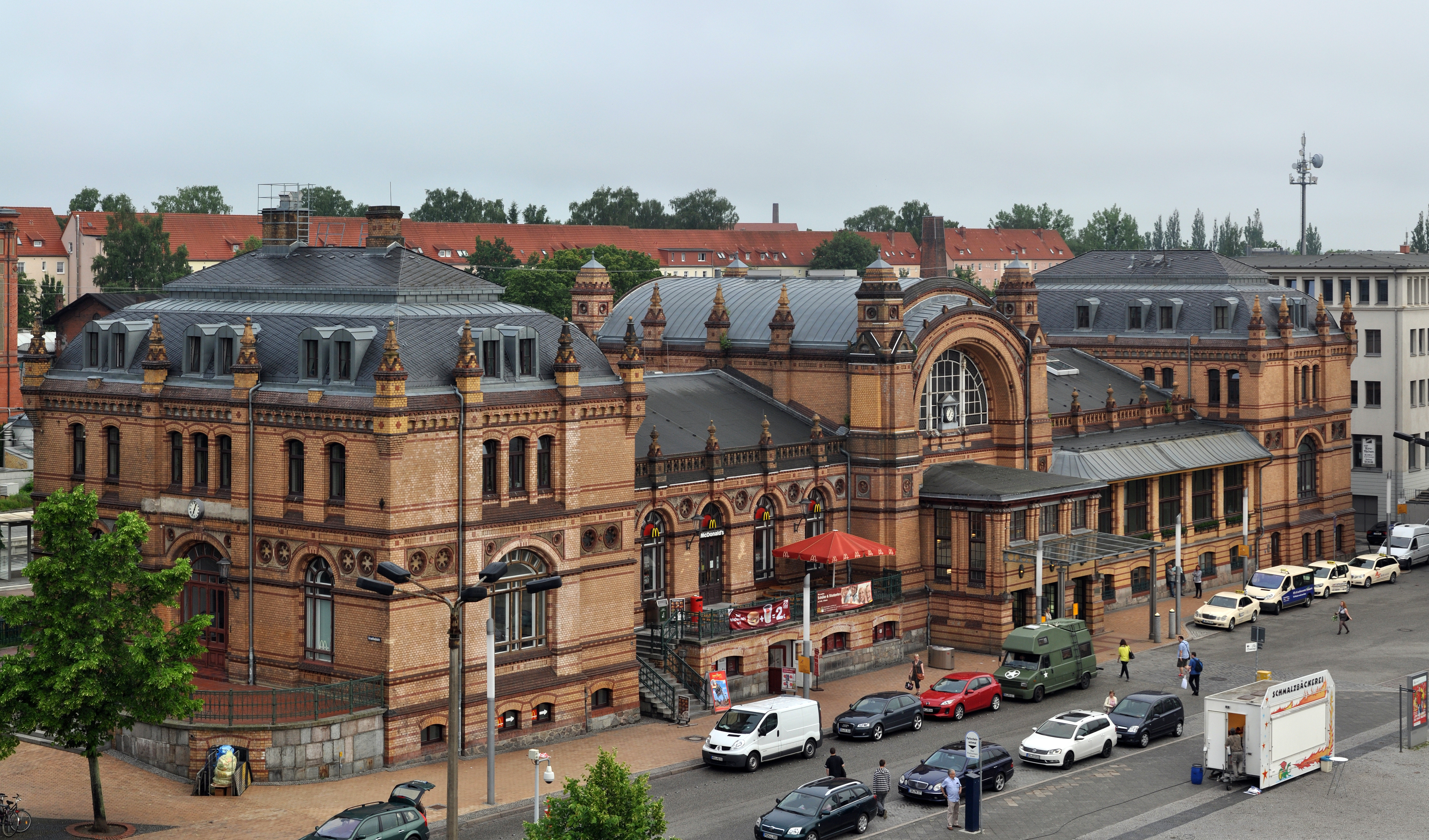
- Station building and station forecourt

General information
- Location: Grunthalplatz 4, Schwerin, MV; Germany
- Coordinates: 53°38′04″N 11°24′29″E
- Owner: Deutsche Bahn
- Operator: DB Station&Service
- Lines: Hagenow–Bad Kleinen (–Rostock) (KBS 100); Ludwigslust–Wismar (KBS 204); Schwerin–Parchim (KBS 152); Schwerin–Rehna (KBS 152)
- Platforms: 4

Construction
- Accessible: Yes

Other information
- Station code: 5755
- DS100 code: WS
- IBNR: 8010324
- Category: 3
- Website: www.bahnhof.de

History
- Opened: 1 May 1847; 179 years ago
- Electrified: 30 May 1987; 39 years ago
Services
Preceding station	DB Fernverkehr	Following station
Rostock Hbf Terminus	ICE 25	Büchen towards München Hbf
Hamburg Hbf towards Hamburg-Altona	ICE 33	Bützow towards Ostseebad Binz
Ludwigslust towards Leipzig Hbf	IC 57	Bad Kleinen towards Warnemünde
Preceding station	DB Regio Nordost	Following station
Schwerin Mitte towards Hamburg Hbf	RE 1	Bad Kleinen towards Rostock Hbf
Lübstorf towards Wismar	RB 17	Schwerin Mitte towards Ludwigslust
Lübstorf towards Bad Kleinen	RB 18	Terminus
Schwerin Mitte towards Ludwigslust	RB 28	Bad Kleinen towards Rostock Hbf
Preceding station	Ostdeutsche Eisenbahn	Following station
Lübstorf towards Wismar	RE 8	Schwerin Mitte towards Elsterwerda
Schwerin-Lankow towards Rehna	RB 13	Schwerin Mitte towards Parchim
Location

Schwerin Hauptbahnhof is the main railway station of the capital of the German state of Mecklenburg-Vorpommern and is located in the northwest of the central city. It includes four tracks on two platforms and a siding west of the fourth track. Currently the station is used by about 12,000 passengers a day.

== Building ==
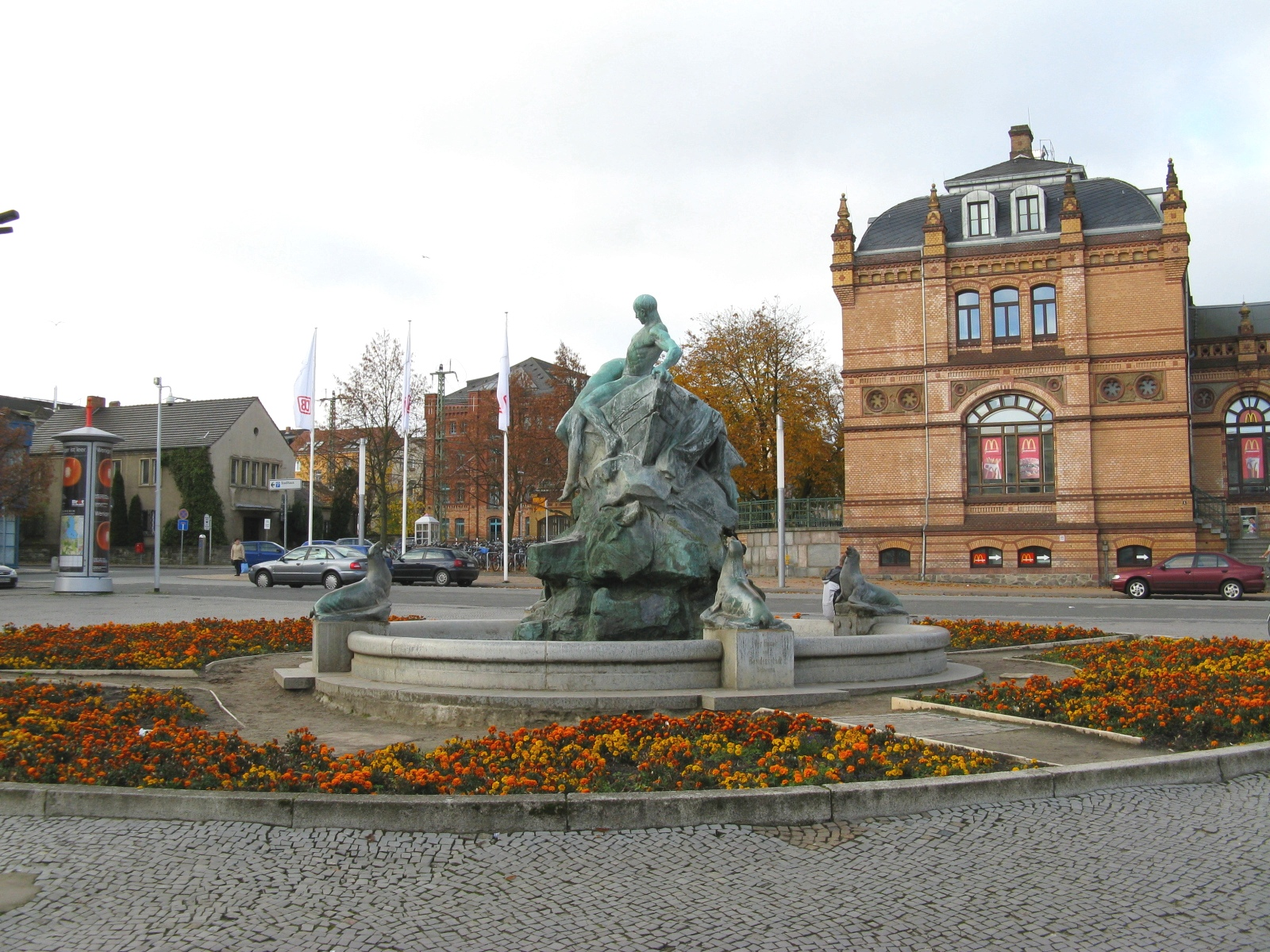
Fountain in front of the station

The station building was built in 1889 and 1890 to a design by E. Müller in the style of the Gründerzeit. The main hall has two lower links connecting to corner pavilions. The entrance hall was lowered in 1927. A few shops are located in the lobby next to the service facilities of Deutsche Bahn. A pedestrian tunnel leads from the hall to two island platforms with four platform tracks. On the opposite side of the station the tunnel is connected to two staircases and an elevator. These lead to Straße Zum Bahnhof (street), which connects to the Platz der Freiheit.

At the station forecourt is a fountain called Rettung in Seenot ("rescue at sea") built in 1910 with bronze sculptures by Hugo Berwald. The fountain was located in the Markt (market) square until 1927. The station forecourt is surrounded by other public transport facilities, the InterCity Hotel (built in 1972 as the Hotel Stadt Schwerin) and residential buildings, four of which were designed by Georg Adolph Demmler in 1847 and built with a uniform facade.

== History ==
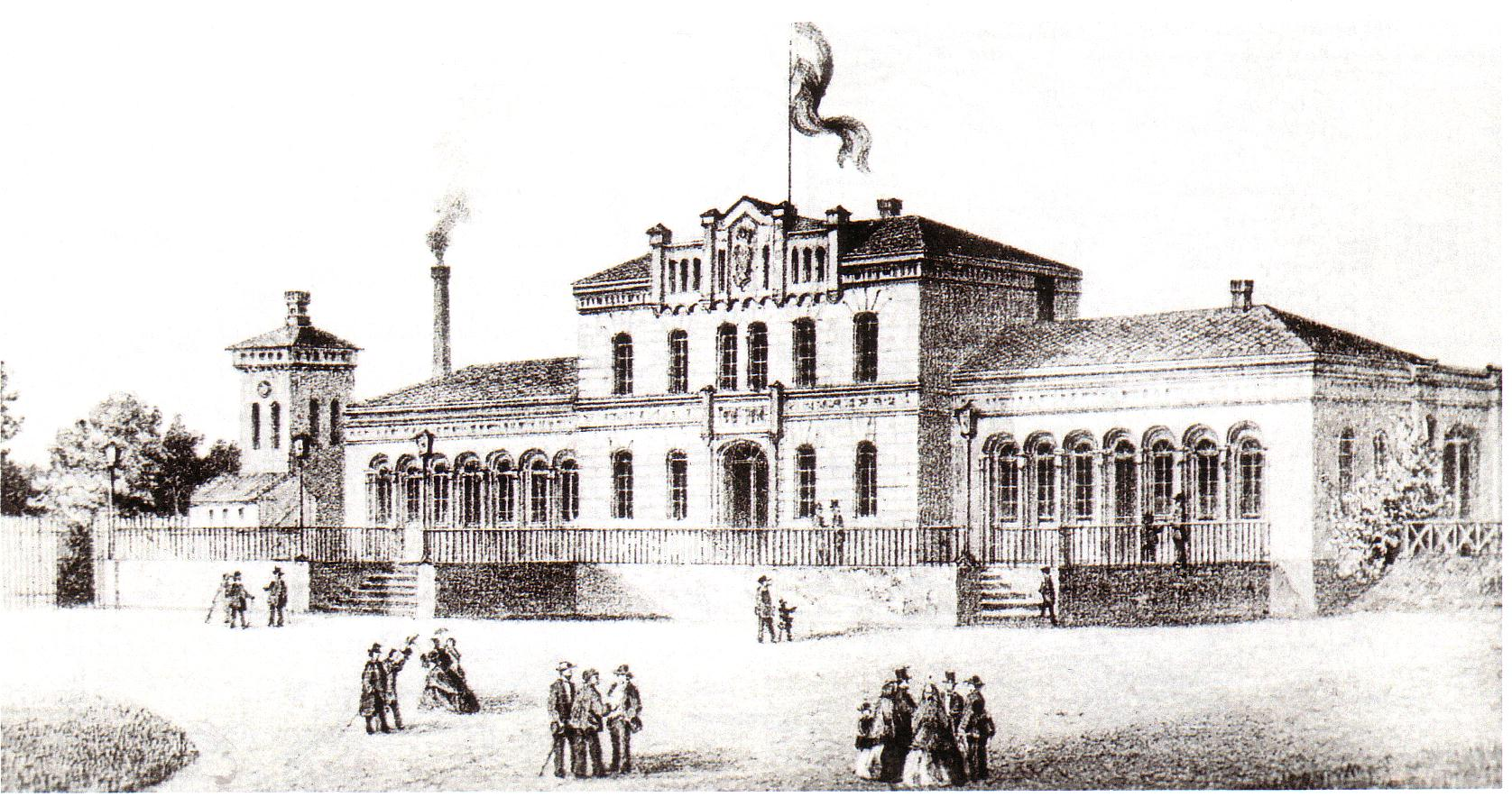
The original 1847 station building

Schwerin had its first rail connection in 1847 with the opening of the railway to Hagenow. This was the first railway in Mecklenburg, opened by the Mecklenburg Railway Company, connecting to the Mecklenburg Railway line. Lines were opened to Wismar in 1848, from Bad Kleinen to Rostock in 1850. A line to Crivitz (extended to Parchim in 1899) and to Ludwiglust opened in 1888 and a line to Rehna opened in 1898.

Between 1889 and 1890 the current station building was built in place of the original station building of 1847. This building has been preserved with its exterior largely unchanged. In the 1920s the station tunnel was built to allow safe access to the platforms.

The square in front of the station is named Grunthalplatz in memory of Marianne Grunthal, who was hanged from a lamppost by SS guards shortly before the end of World War II for welcoming the news of Hitler's death.

The station was officially re-opened in December 2005, after three and a half years of modernisation.

== Rail services ==
The station was served by the following services in 2026:

=== Long distance ===
Line	Route	Interval
ICE 25	Rostock – Schwerin – Hamburg – Hanover – Würzburg – Nuremberg – Munich	Once a day
ICE 33	Hamburg-Altona – Hamburg – Schwerin – Rostock – Stralsund – Ostseebad Binz/Greifswald	Every 2 hours
IC 57	(Warnemünde –) Rostock – Schwerin – Stendal – Magdeburg – Halle (Saale) – Leipzig	1 train pair

=== Regional ===
Line	Route	Interval	Operator
RE 1	Rostock – Bützow – Bad Kleinen – Schwerin – Hagenow Land – Büchen – Hamburg	Every 2 hours	DB Regio Nordost
RE 4	Schwerin – Bad Kleinen – Grevesmühlen – Lübeck	1 train pair	DB Regio Nordost
RE 8	Wismar – Bad Kleinen – Schwerin – Ludwigslust – Wittenberge – Berlin – Potsdamer Platz – Südkreuz – Wünsdorf-Waldstadt – Elsterwerda	Every 2 hours	Ostdeutsche Eisenbahn
RB 13	Rehna – Gadebusch – Schwerin – Crivitz – Parchim	Hourly	Ostdeutsche Eisenbahn
RB 17	Wismar – Bad Kleinen – Schwerin – Ludwigslust	Every 2 hours	DB Regio Nordost
RB 18	Bad Kleinen – Schwerin	Every 2 hours	DB Regio Nordost
RB 28	Ludwigslust – Schwerin – Bad Kleinen – Bützow – Rostock	Some trains	DB Regio Nordost

== See also ==
- Rail transport in Germany
- Railway stations in Germany
