= Bad Kleinen =

- Municipality
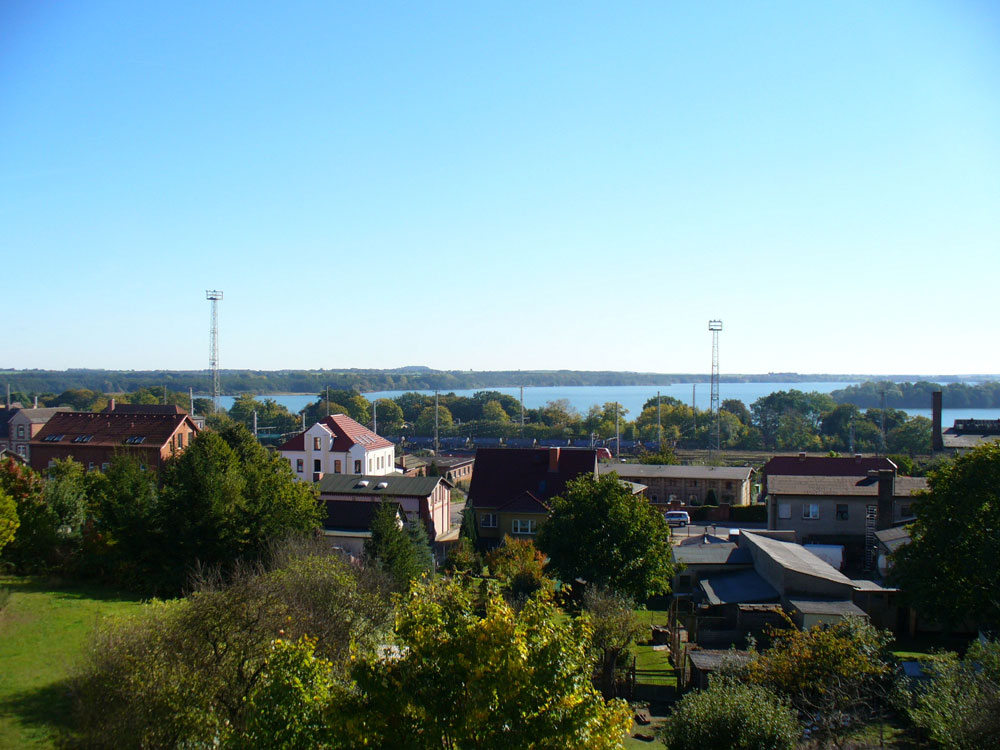
- Bad Kleinen, Overlooking a train station with the Schweriner See in the distance.

- Coat of arms

- Location of Bad Kleinen within Nordwestmecklenburg district
- Interactive map of Bad Kleinen
- Location within Germany Location within Mecklenburg-Vorpommern
- Coordinates: 53°46′N 11°28′E
- Country: Germany
- State: Mecklenburg-Vorpommern
- District: Nordwestmecklenburg
- Municipal assoc.: Dorf Mecklenburg-Bad Kleinen
- Subdivisions: 8 Ortsteile

Government
  - Mayor: Joachim Wölm (Left)

Area
  - Total: 23.43 km^{2} (9.05 sq mi)
- Elevation: 35 m (115 ft)

Population (2025-12-31)
  - Total: 3,742
  - Density: 159.7/km^{2} (413.6/sq mi)
- Time zone: UTC+01:00 (CET)
  - Summer (DST): UTC+02:00 (CEST)
- Postal codes: 23996
- Dialling codes: 038423
- Vehicle registration: NWM
- Website: www.bad-kleinen-info.de

Bad Kleinen (until 1915 Kleinen) is a municipality in the Nordwestmecklenburg district, in Mecklenburg-Vorpommern, Germany. It is located on the north bank of the Schweriner See. Bad Kleinen is part of the Hamburg Metropolitan Region.

== Geography ==
The municipality is located on the north bank of the Schweriner See, the fourth largest lake in Germany, and about half-way between the state capital Schwerin and Hanseatic city of Wismar, and close to Lübeck. The famous German Philosopher and Mathematician Gottlob Frege (*8 November 1848 Wismar – †26 July 1925 Bad Kleinen) lived in Bad Kleinen. In his honor every year during Spring, the people of Nordwestmecklenburg make a walking tour between Wismar (Frege's Birthplace) and Bad Kleinen. The current mayor of Bad Kleinen is Joachim Wölm.

== History ==
During the police arrest operation on 27 June 1993 at Bad Kleinen station, led by the Federal Criminal Police Office (BKA) and the GSG 9 counter‑terrorism unit and targeting Red Army Faction (RAF) members Wolfgang Grams and Birgit Hogefeld, GSG 9 officer Michael Newrzella was shot and killed, and Grams also died during the incident. The operation became one of the most controversial security operations in the history of the Federal Republic, leading to multiple investigations and significant political fallout.
