= Lake Schwerin =

Lake in Mecklenburg-Vorpommern, Germany

- Schweriner See (German)
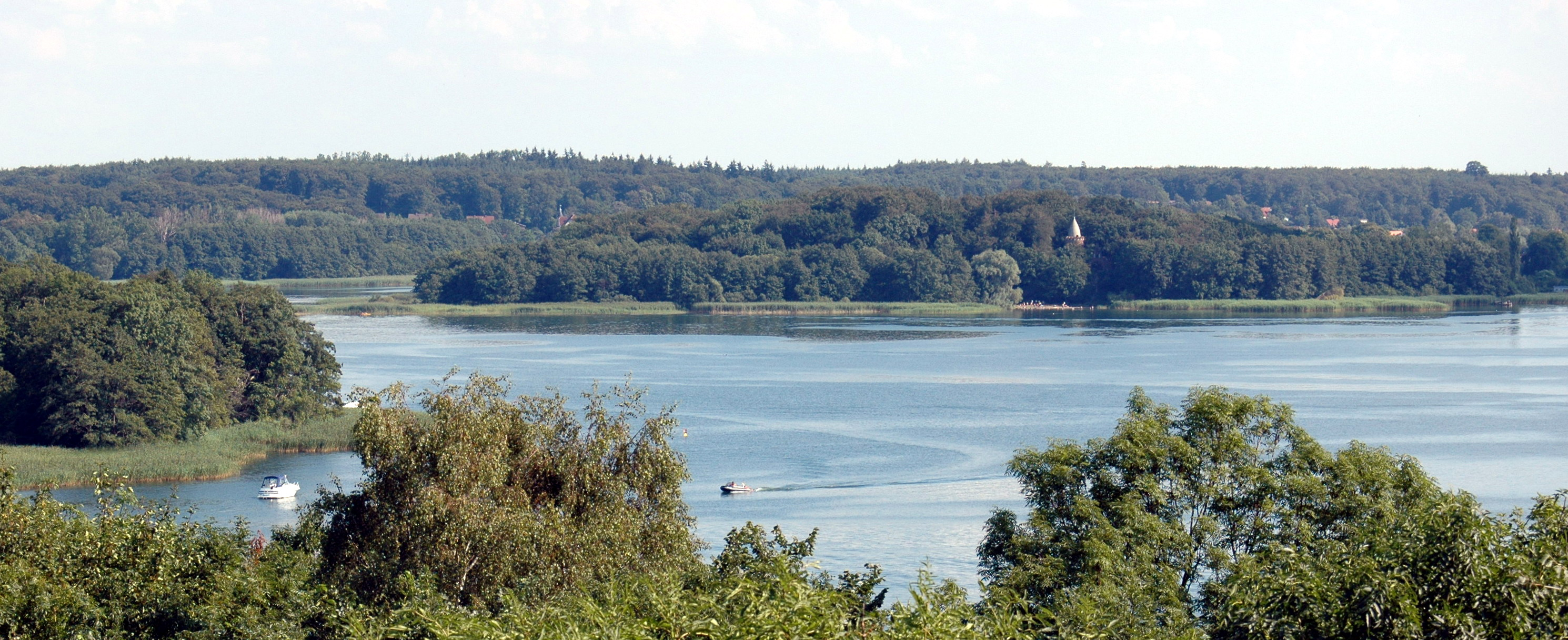

- Location within Germany Location within Mecklenburg-Vorpommern
- Location: Mecklenburg-Western Pomerania
- Coordinates: 53°38′N 11°28′E
- Type: eutrophic
- Primary outflows: Wallensteingraben, Stör
- Basin countries: Germany
- Max. length: 21 km (13 mi)
- Max. width: 6 km (3.7 mi)
- Surface area: 61.54 km^{2} (23.76 mi^{2})
- Average depth: 12.8 m (42 ft)
- Max. depth: 52.4 m (172 ft)
- Residence time: 10.1 years
- Surface elevation: 37.6 m (123 ft)
- Settlements: Schwerin, Bad Kleinen

Lake Schwerin (German: Schweriner See [ʃveˈʁiːnɐ ˌzeː]) is a lake in Mecklenburg-Vorpommern, northern Germany. It was named after the city Schwerin, on its southwestern shore. The smaller town Bad Kleinen is on the north shore of the lake. Its surface is approximately 61.54 square kilometres (23.76 mi^{2}), and its maximum depth is 52.4 metres (172 ft). The natural outflow of the lake is the (channelized) river Stör, a tributary of the Elde, and part of the Elbe watershed. The Wallensteingraben, a 16th-century canal, connects the lake with the Baltic Sea at Wismar.

== Gallery ==
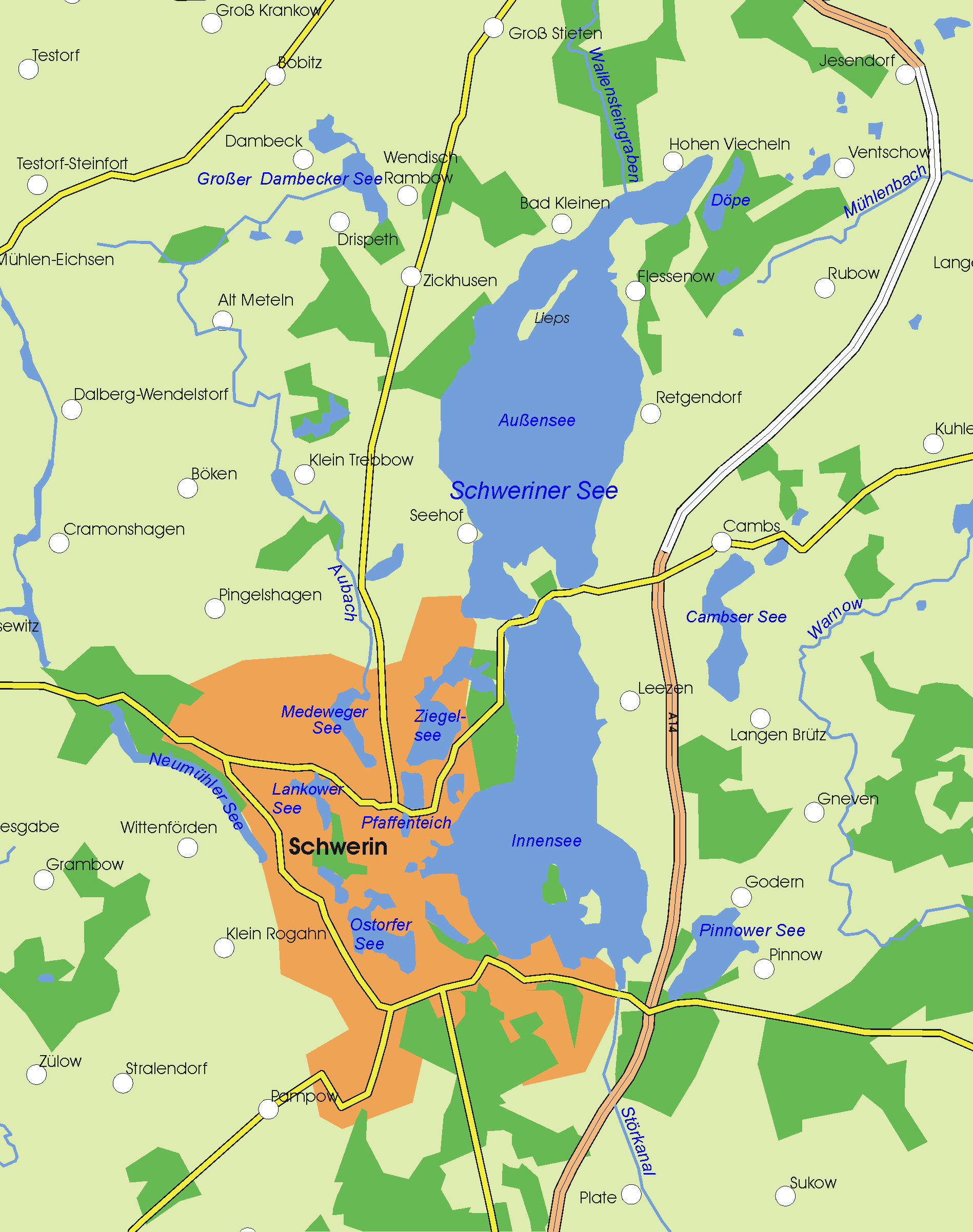
Map of Schwerin and its lakes, most dominantly the Lake Schwerin with its inner and outer lake area

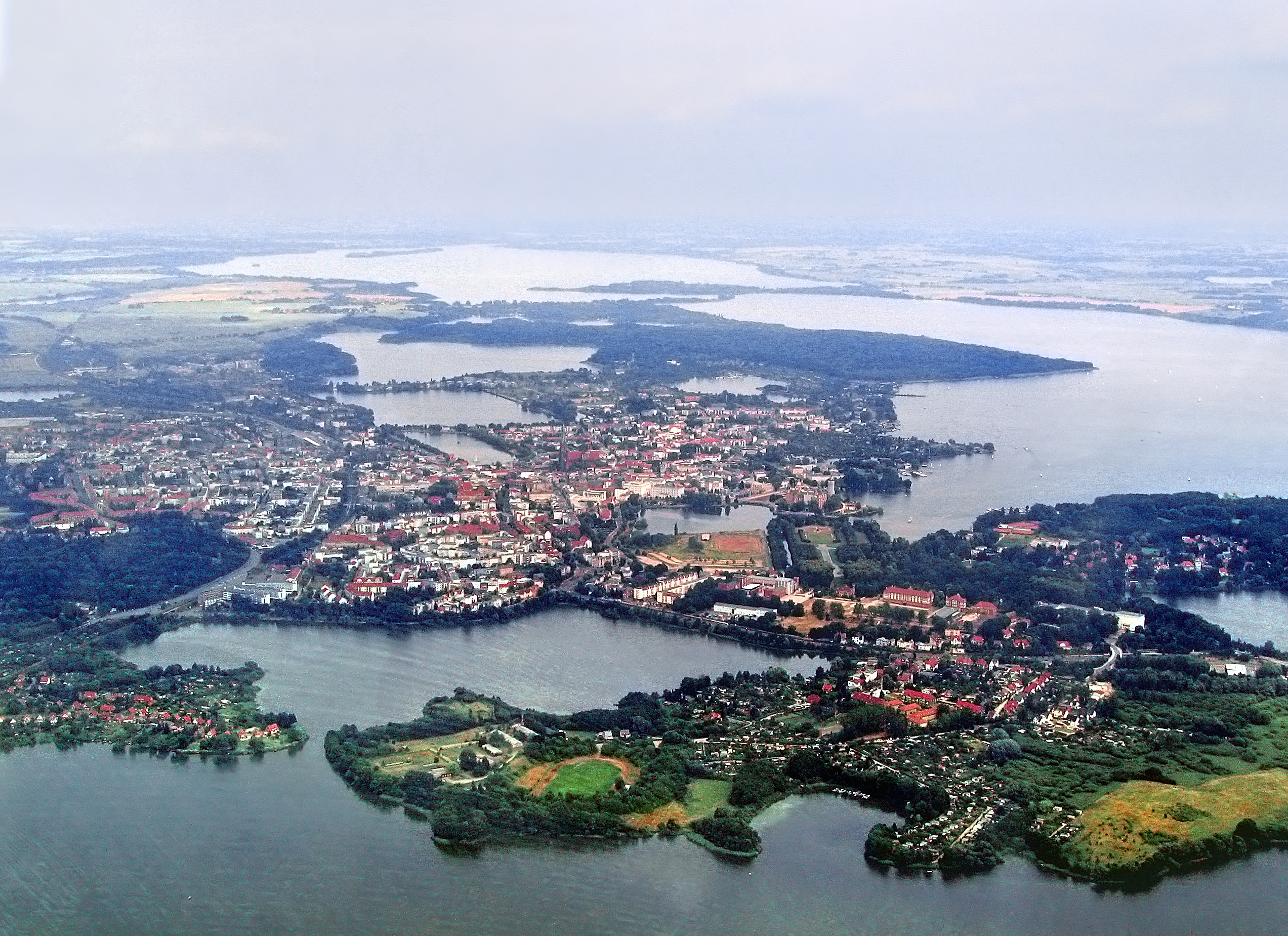
Aerial view of Schwerin on the lakes

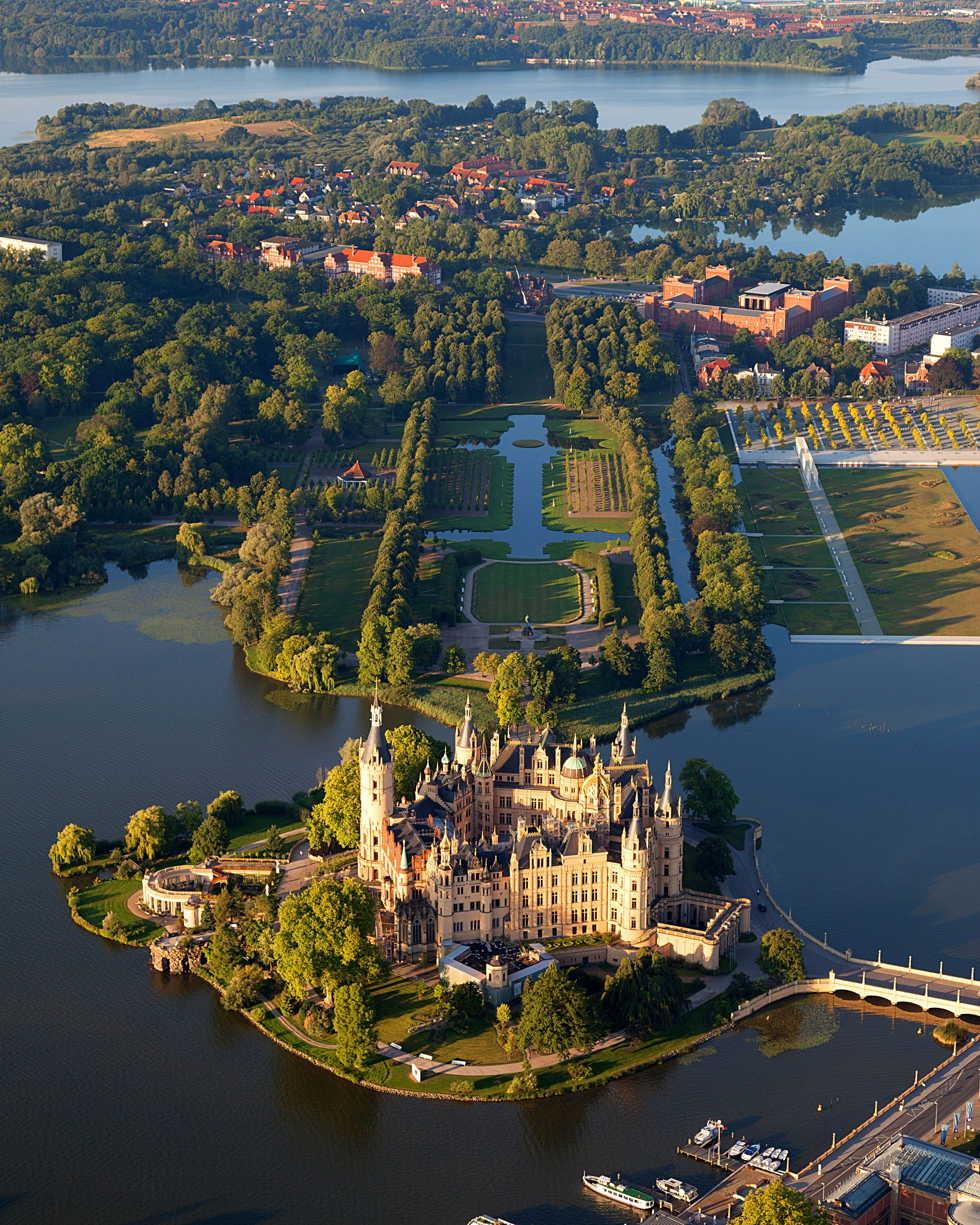
Schwerin Castle on its own island in the Lake Schwerin

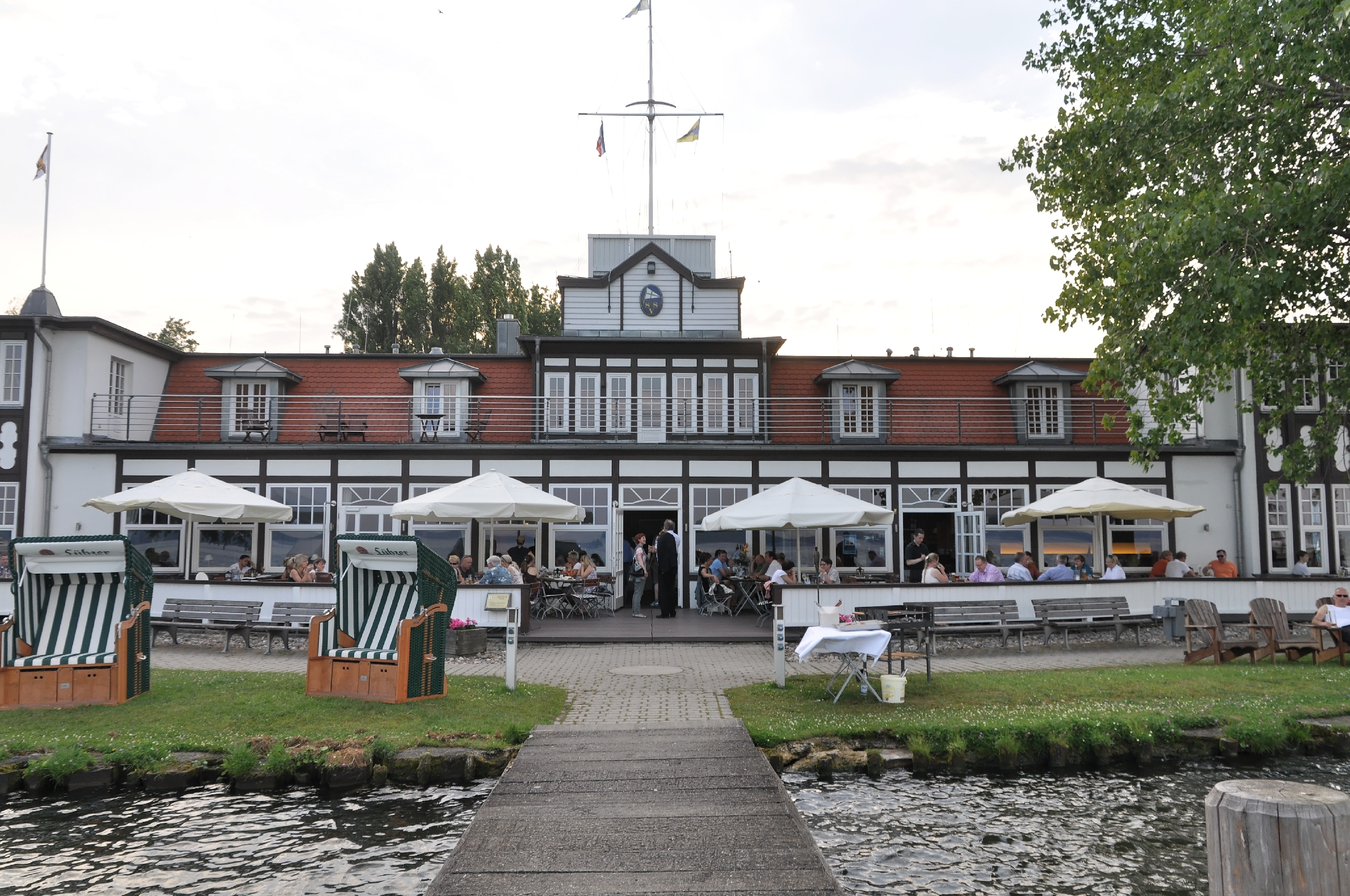
Yachting Club at Lake Schwerin

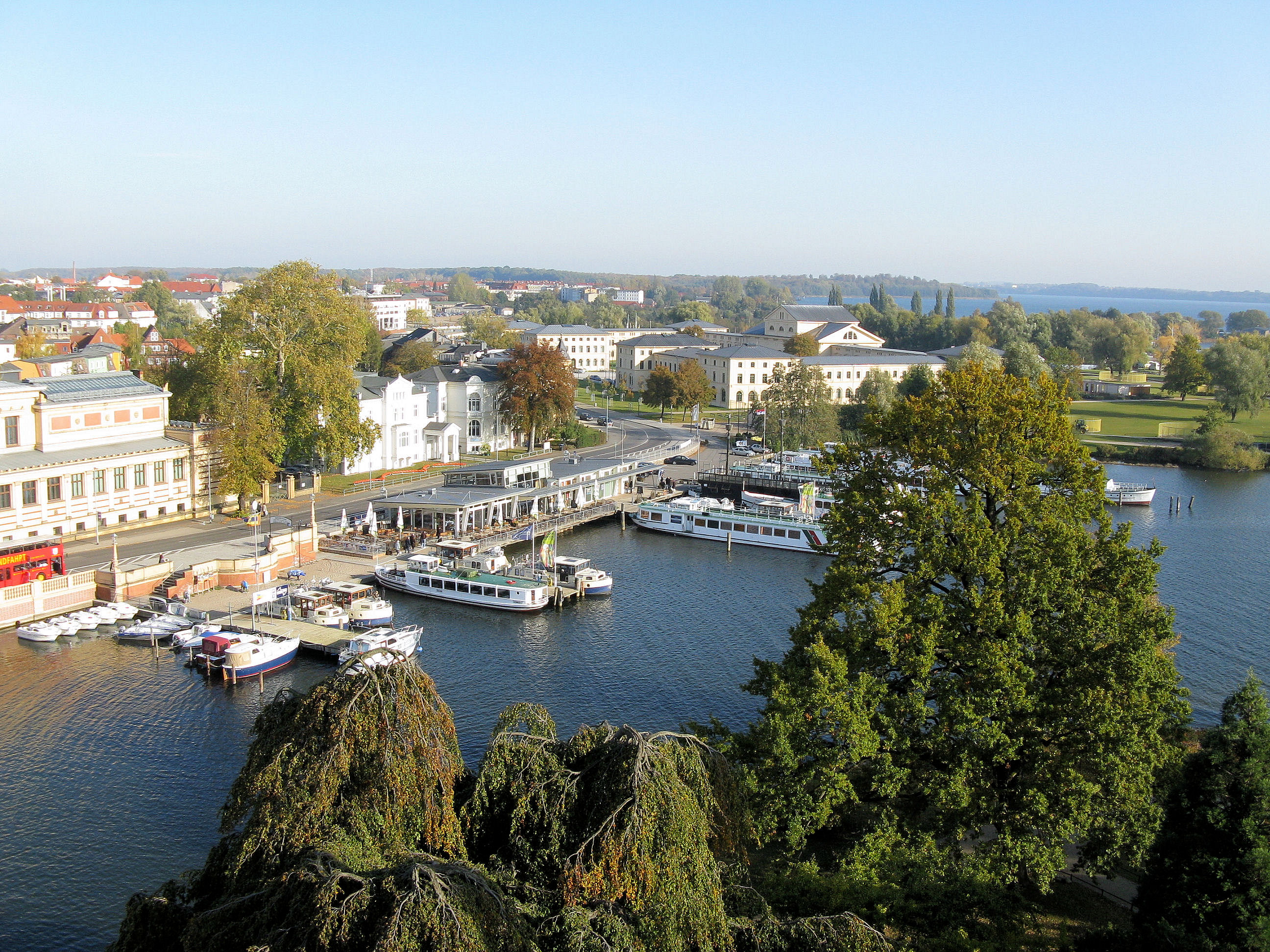
White Fleet, cruiseships at the city's lakeshore

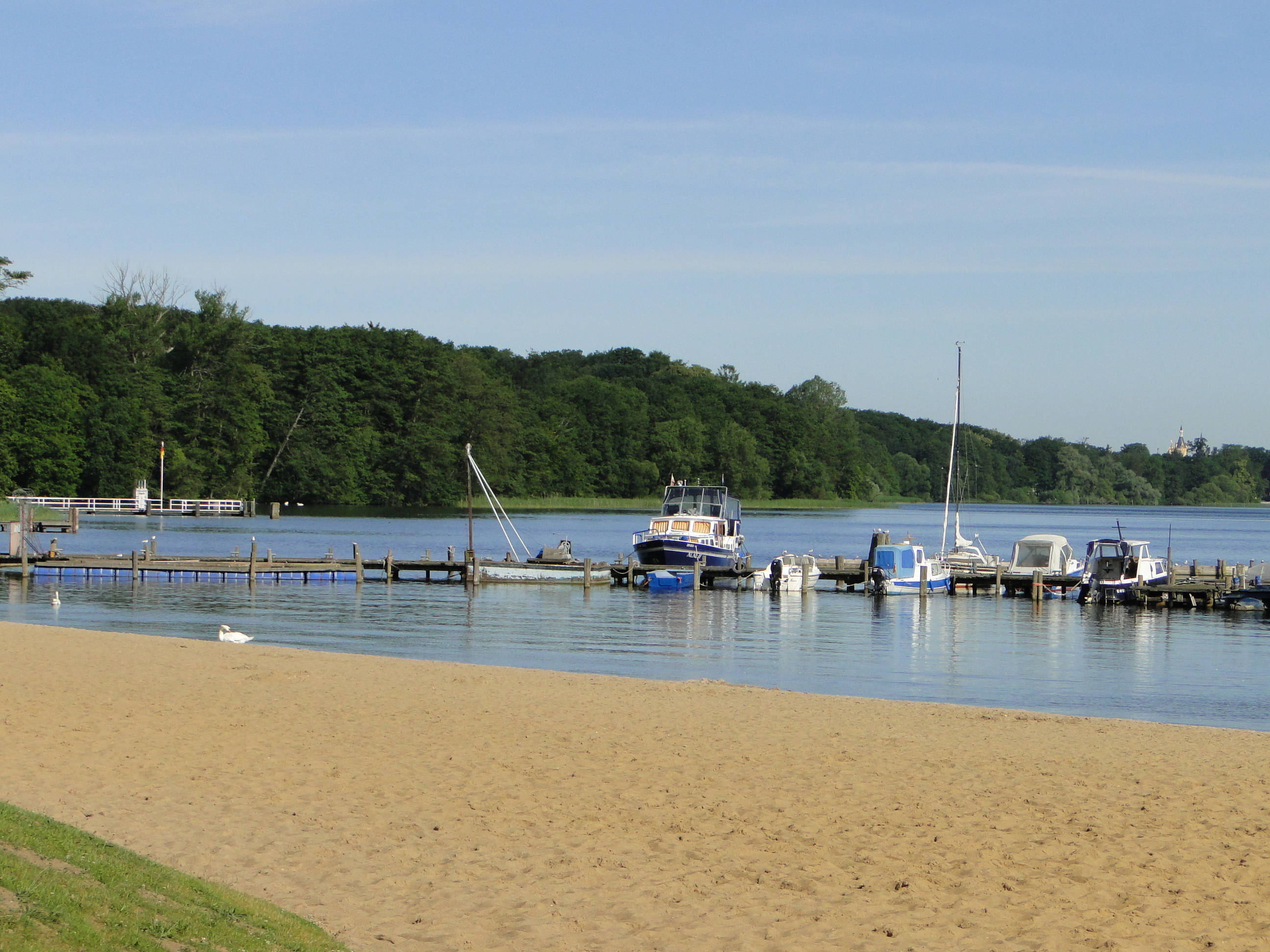
Beach in Zippendorf, a district of Schwerin

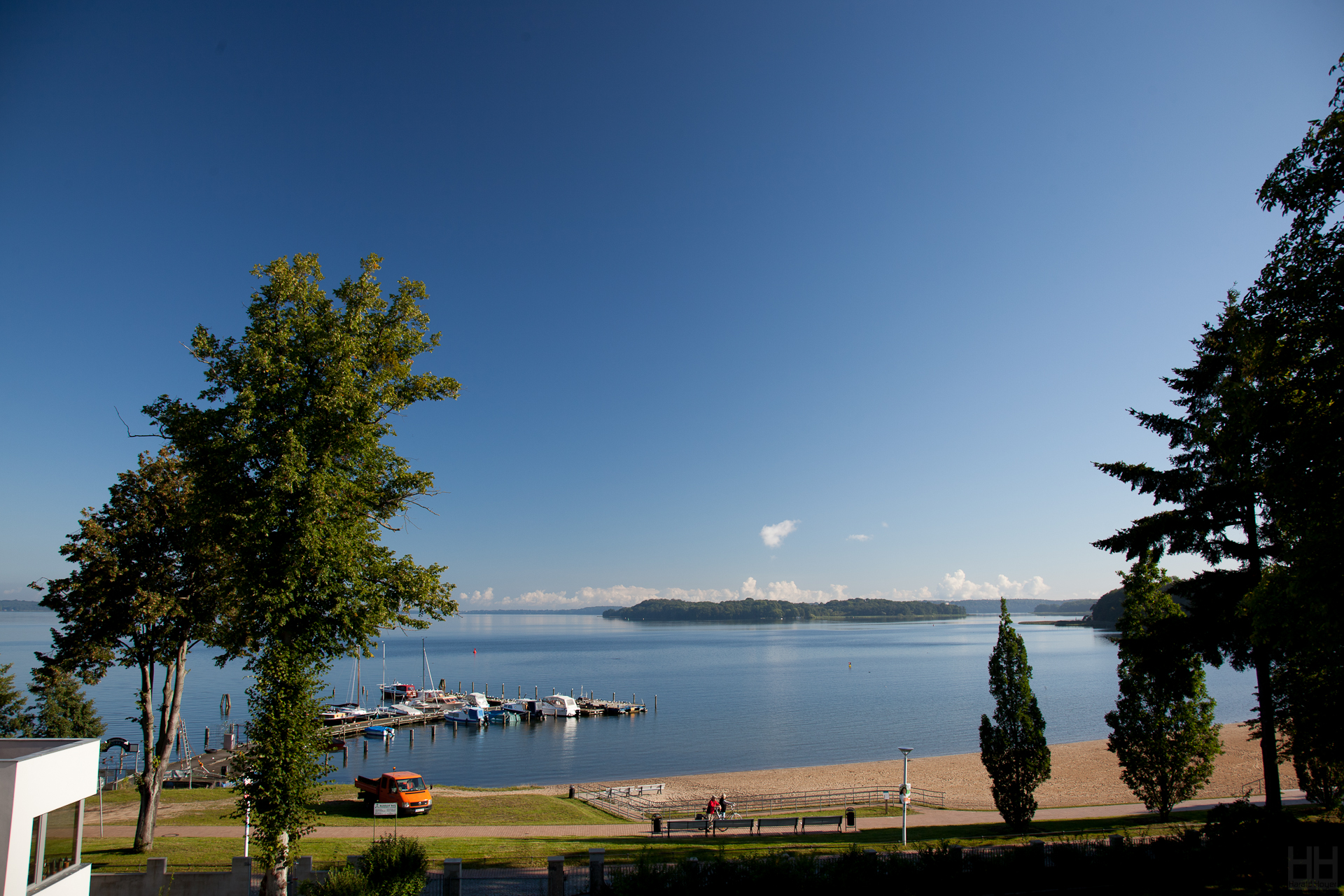
View of Kaninchenwerder from Zippendorf

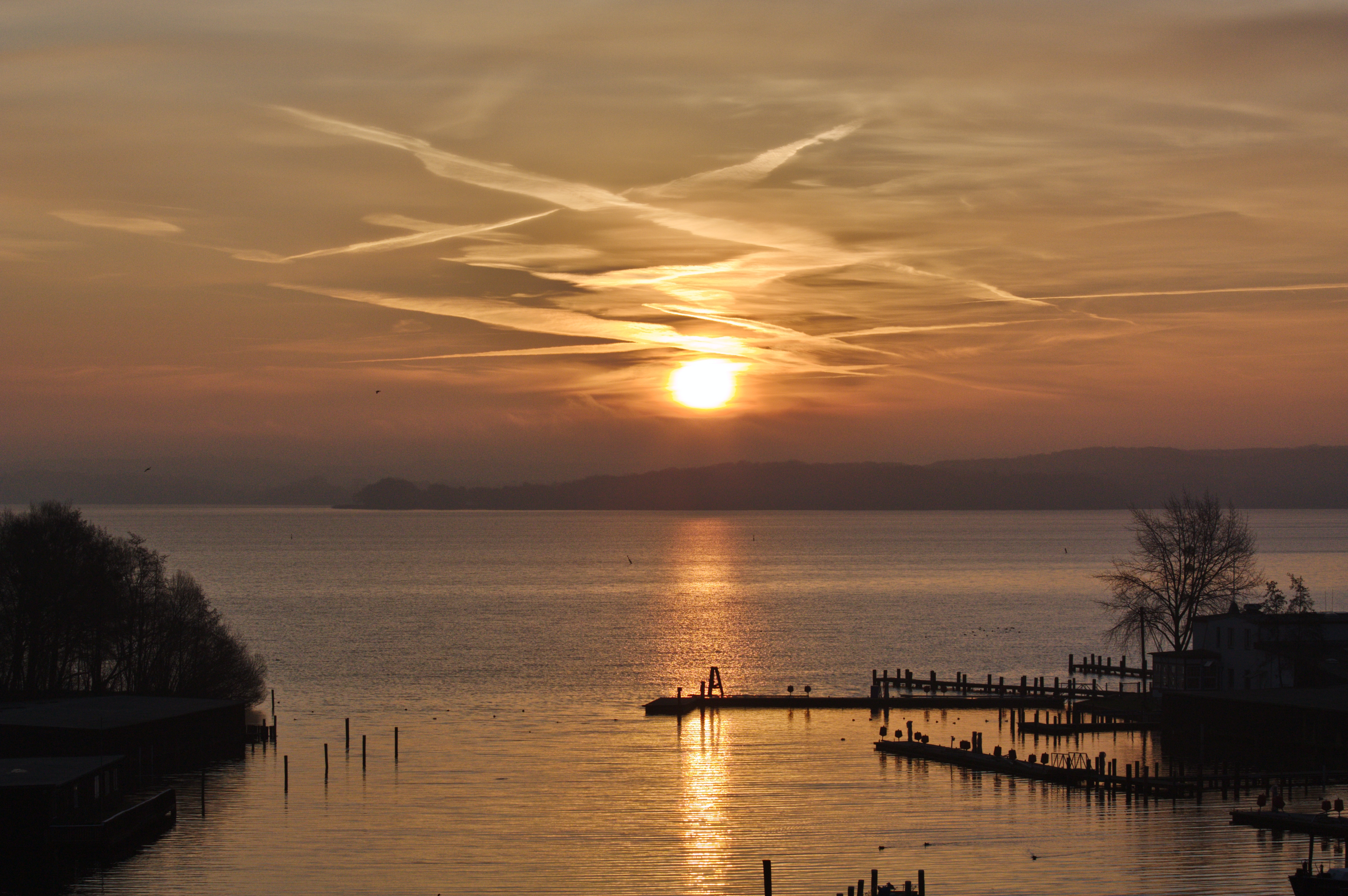
Sunrise at the Marstall peninsula

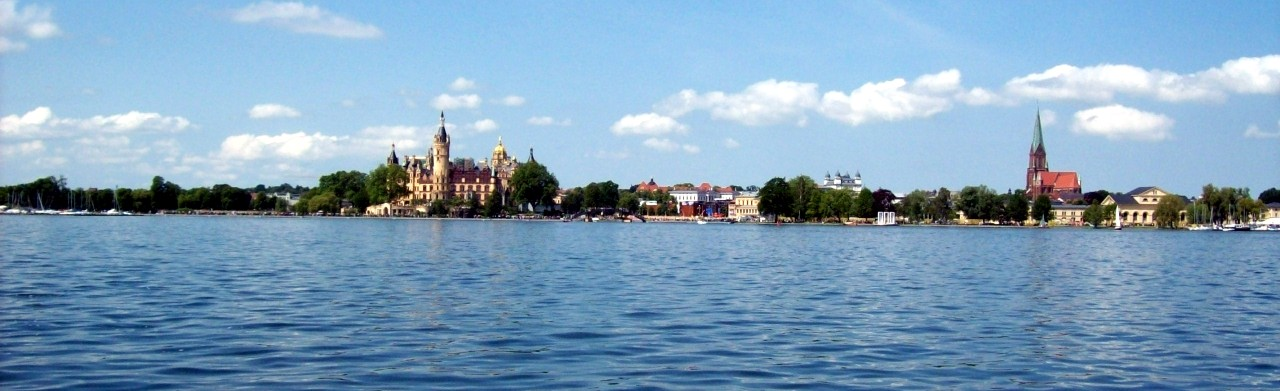
Schwerin seen from the Lake

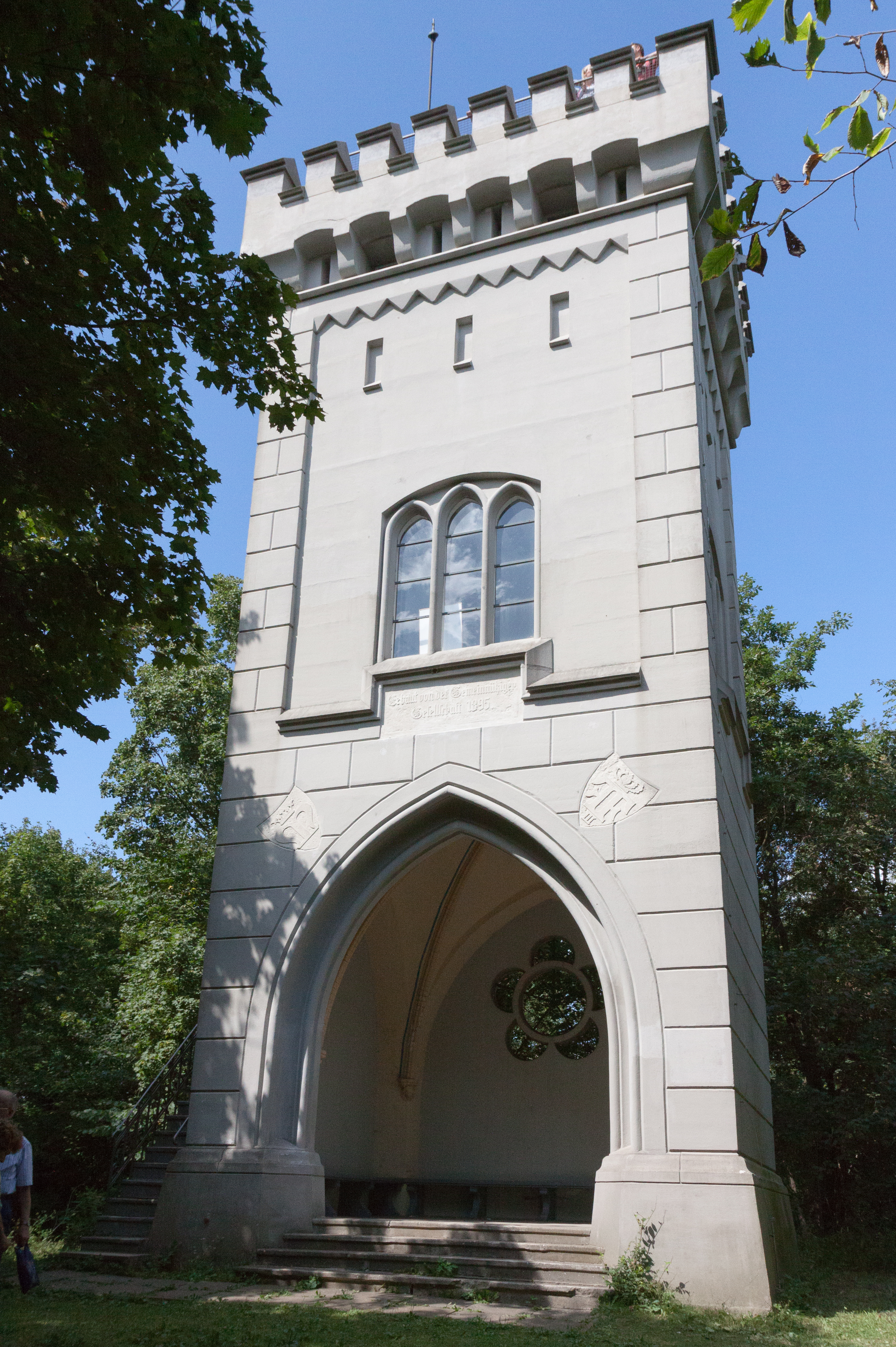
Observation tower on Kaninchenwerder, an island of Lake Schwerin

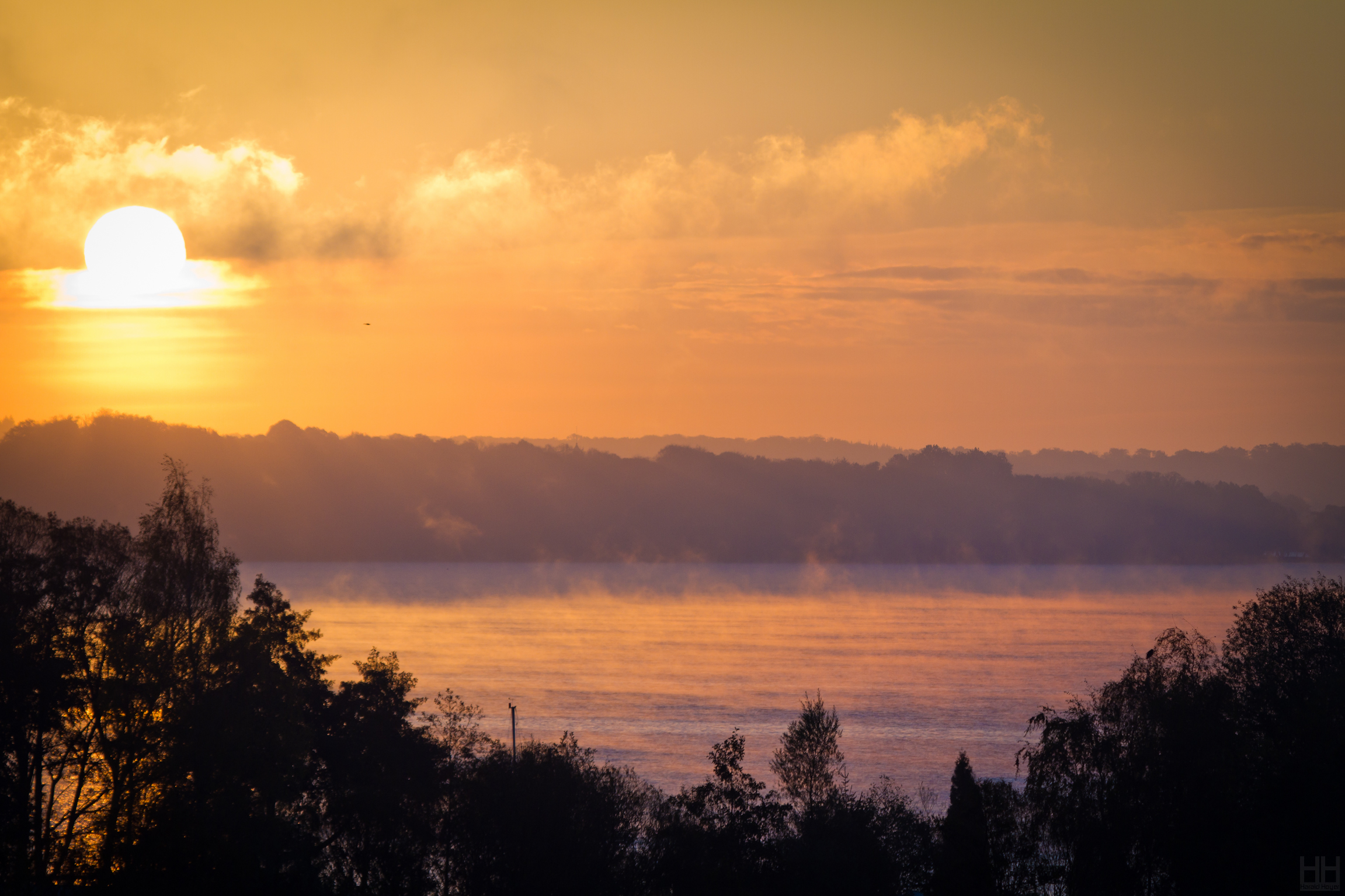
Sunrise at Ziegelwerder island
