= Rostock railway station =

Rostock railway station may refer to:

- Rostock Hauptbahnhof railway station, the main railway station in the German city of Rostock
- Rostock-Kassebohm railway station, a railway station in the German city of Rostock
- Rostock Thierfelder Straße railway station, a railway station in the German city of Rostock
- Rostock railway station (Jungfraubahn), a former railway station on the Jungfraubahn in Switzerland
