= Glöwen station =

Railway station in Plattenburg, Germany

Glöwen
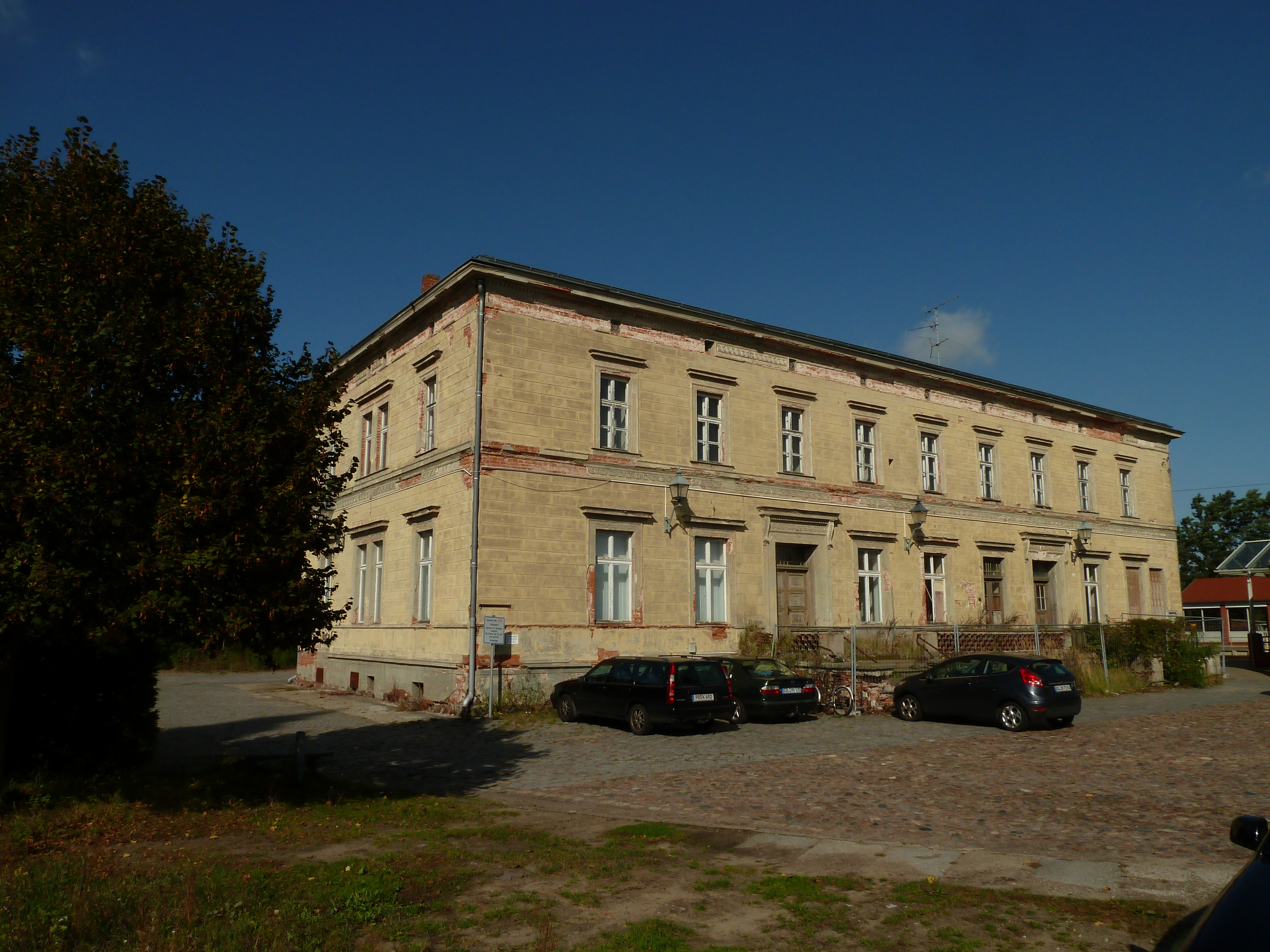
- Entrance building, street side. The tracks are to the right of the building.

General information
- Location: Am Bahnhof 1, Glöwen, Plattenburg, Brandenburg; Germany
- Coordinates: 52°54′12″N 12°05′02″E
- Owner: Deutsche Bahn
- Operator: DB Station&Service
- Lines: Berlin–Hamburg (KBS 204); Glöwen–Havelberg (dismantled); Light Railway of the District of West and East Prignitz (Viesecke–Glöwen) (dismantled)
- Platforms: 2

Construction
- Accessible: Yes
- Architect: Friedrich Neuhaus; Ferdinand Wilhelm Holz
- Architectural style: Neoclassical

Other information
- Station code: 2148
- DS100 code: WGF
- IBNR: 8011641
- Category: 6
- Fare zone: VBB: 4635
- Website: www.bahnhof.de

History
- Opened: 15 October 1846

Services
Preceding station	Ostdeutsche Eisenbahn	Following station
Bad Wilsnack towards Wismar	RE 8	Breddin towards Elsterwerda
Location
- Location within Brandenburg Location within Germany Location within Europe

Glöwen station is a station on the Berlin–Hamburg Railway in the town of Glöwen, which is in the municipality of Plattenburg and the German state of Brandenburg.

== Location ==
The station is located at kilometre 101.8 of the Berlin–Hamburg railway on the southern outskirts of Glöwen, about one km south of the town centre. The railway line in this area runs approximately east–west and crosses federal highway 107 in the station area. The town of Havelberg lies about ten km to the south.

== History ==
The Berlin–Hamburg railway was opened between Berlin and Boizenburg on 15 October 1846 and Glöwen station was opened on the same day. The station was intended from the beginning to serve not only the comparatively small town of Glöwen, but also as a hub for Havelberg and a number of other places. In the years following the opening of the station, two passenger fares were offered on the day to Havelberg, plus a fare on the day to Genthin and even a fare to Rostock. Patronage at Glöwen station in 1847 was in sixth place of the stations of the Berlin-Hamburg Railway after Berlin, Hamburg, Hagenow, Wittenberge and Ludwigslust.

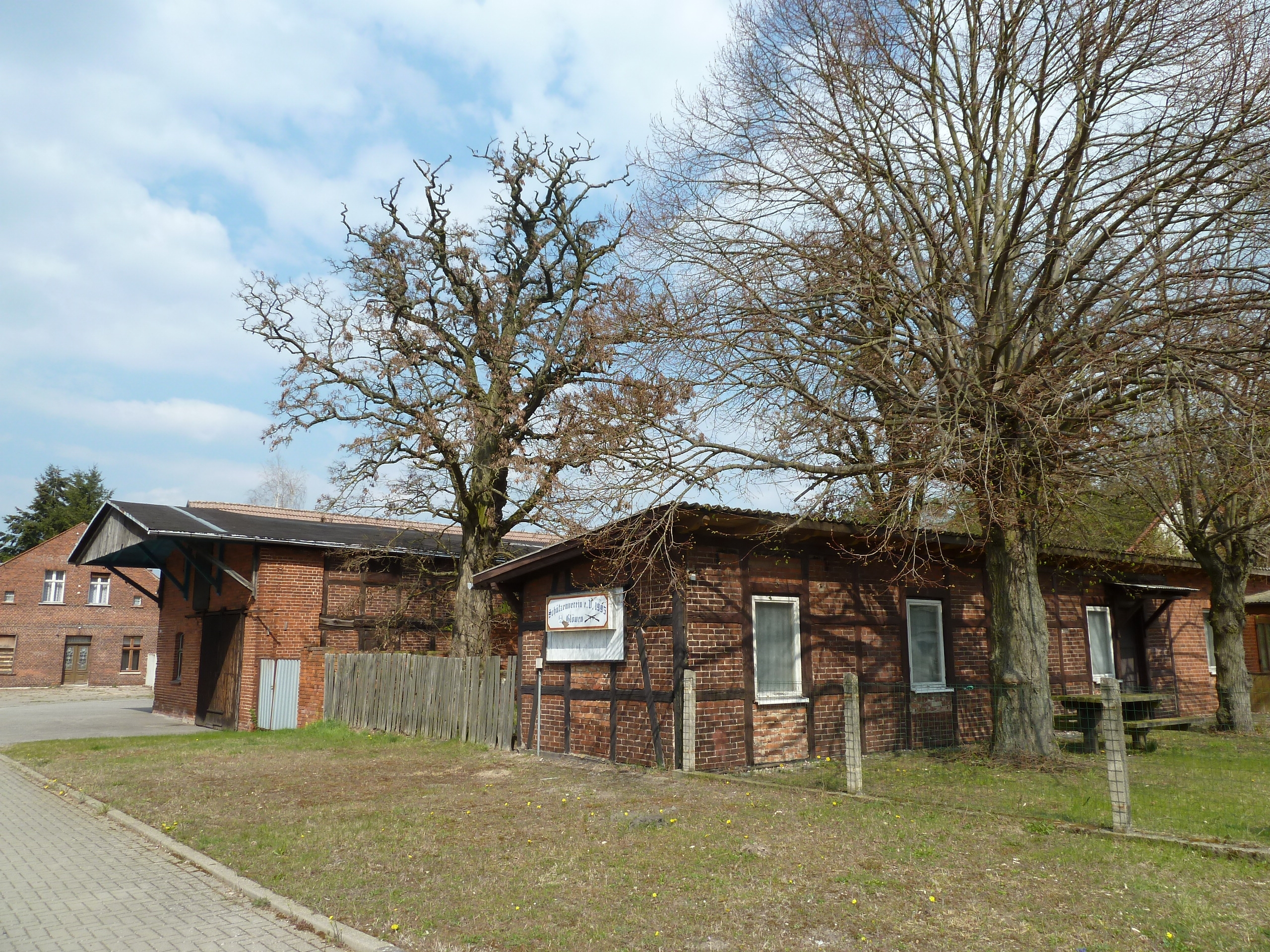
Former station building of the narrow gauge railway

In the following years there were various plans to connect more railway lines in Glöwen. In 1872, the Berlin-Anhalt Railway Company (Berlin-Anhaltische Eisenbahn-Gesellschaft), carried out preparatory work for a railway from Glöwen towards Jüterbog or Wittenberg via Brandenburg and extending to Saxony. These plans were abandoned during the Panic of 1873 (Gründerkrach).

The railway to Havelberg went into operation on 15 February 1890. The original plans for a more extensive north–south connection were not pursued. On the one hand, the topographic situation in the Havelberg area, where a crossing of the Havel would have been necessary, was difficult and, on the other hand, a network of narrow gauge railways was built around 1900 in the Prignitz north of the Hamburg railway. This meant that a continuous connections from Havelberg to the north was no longer useful. A section of this narrow gauge network linked Glöwen with Viesecke and over longer distances with Pritzwalk, Kyritz and Perleberg from 1900.

Extensive military installations were built south of Glöwen in about 1940. South of the station there was a plant, partly for refurbishing ammunition, in which prisoners from the Glöwen camp, a satellite camp of the Sachsenhausen concentration camp, had to work in the last years of the war. The plant was connected by a siding branching off the line to Havelberg.

After the war the railway to Havelberg was dismantled as reparations to the Soviet Union. After strong protests from the region, it was then rebuilt, but with a 750 mm gauge. Even after the Second World War, Glöwen remained an important military location, which was accessed from the station. This was reflected in the fact that some Durchgangszug (express trains) running between Schwerin and Berlin also stopped in Glöwen until the early 1990s. In 1967, the narrow-gauge railway was closed to Viesecke and dismantled a little later; in 1971, the same happened with the line to Havelberg.

A regular-interval integrated timetable was introduced in the mid-1990s. Every two hours local services connected Glöwen with Wittenberge and Nauen, where there was a connection to Berlin; from 1996 services ran directly to Berlin Westkreuz. The service ran hourly between Wittenberge and Berlin from 1997. The line between Berlin and Hamburg was upgraded in two stages in the 1990s and 2000s. In the first stage of the line was electrified and Glöwen station was rebuilt and provided with platforms on the outsides of the tracks. In the second stage, the line was upgraded to a maximum speed of 230 km/h. As part of this work, the level crossing on the federal highway at Glöwen station was replaced by an underpass.

Today (as of 2014) Glöwen Station is served by the RE 2 Regional-Express service, operated by Ostdeutsche Eisenbahn, connecting to Wismar and Cottbus via Berlin and Wittenberge. Buses stop at the station on bus route 900 operated by Stendalbus to Havelberg with a connection to Stendal.

== Infrastructure ==
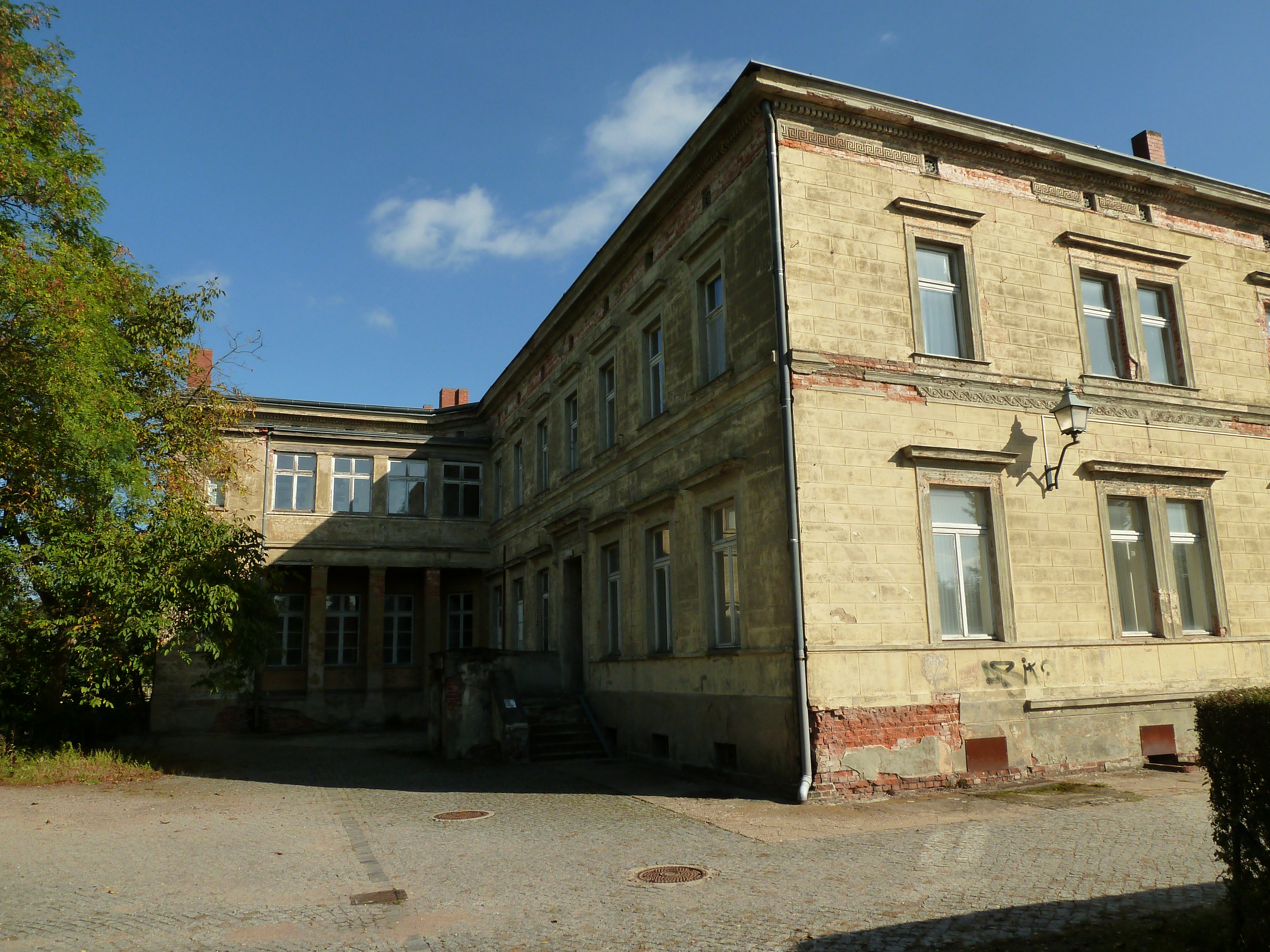
Forecourt side of the station building

The station building, which dates from the building of the line, is to the west of the road to Havelberg and south of the tracks, on the side facing away from the town. It was probably designed by the planning director of the Berlin–Hamburg Railway, Friedrich Neuhaus together with Ferdinand Wilhelm Holz. The basic design of the building is similar to Ludwigslust station and the original Boizenburg station building, which no longer exists. The two-story building with a flat hip roof has an L-shaped ground plan. The outer side facing north on the side of the tracks has six portals and the side facing east towards the federal highway has nine portals. This asymmetric plan differs significantly from most other station buildings on the Berlin–Hamburg railway. The shape of the building, unlike some other stations of the Berlin–Hamburg railway, has not been altered by later additions with the exception of a loggia attached to the inside of the courtyard after 1859. Living quarters were established in the longer wing of the building and the waiting rooms among other things were located in the shorter wing.

The facade is decorated with different decorative elements. These include a meandering band on the eaves of the cornices and a number of decorative elements on windows and doors, such as ventilation holes in the cornices over the windows. The window elements facing the tracks are richly decorated. Manfred Berger stated in 1980 that the building was a functional, yet beautiful building that was amazing for this small town in Brandenburg.

In 1982, the building was declared a national monument. Since the station staff was withdrawn in the 1990s, the building has been unused and is empty. Damage caused by decay are clearly visible. In many places the plaster has crumbled and the decorative elements are partially destroyed. It is now also listed in the heritage list of station buildings. In the autumn of 2012, the station building was bought by an investor for renovation and use to house shops, refreshments and services, particularly for the Federal horticulture show (Bundesgartenschau) that is taking place in the region in 2015.

=== Other infrastructure ===
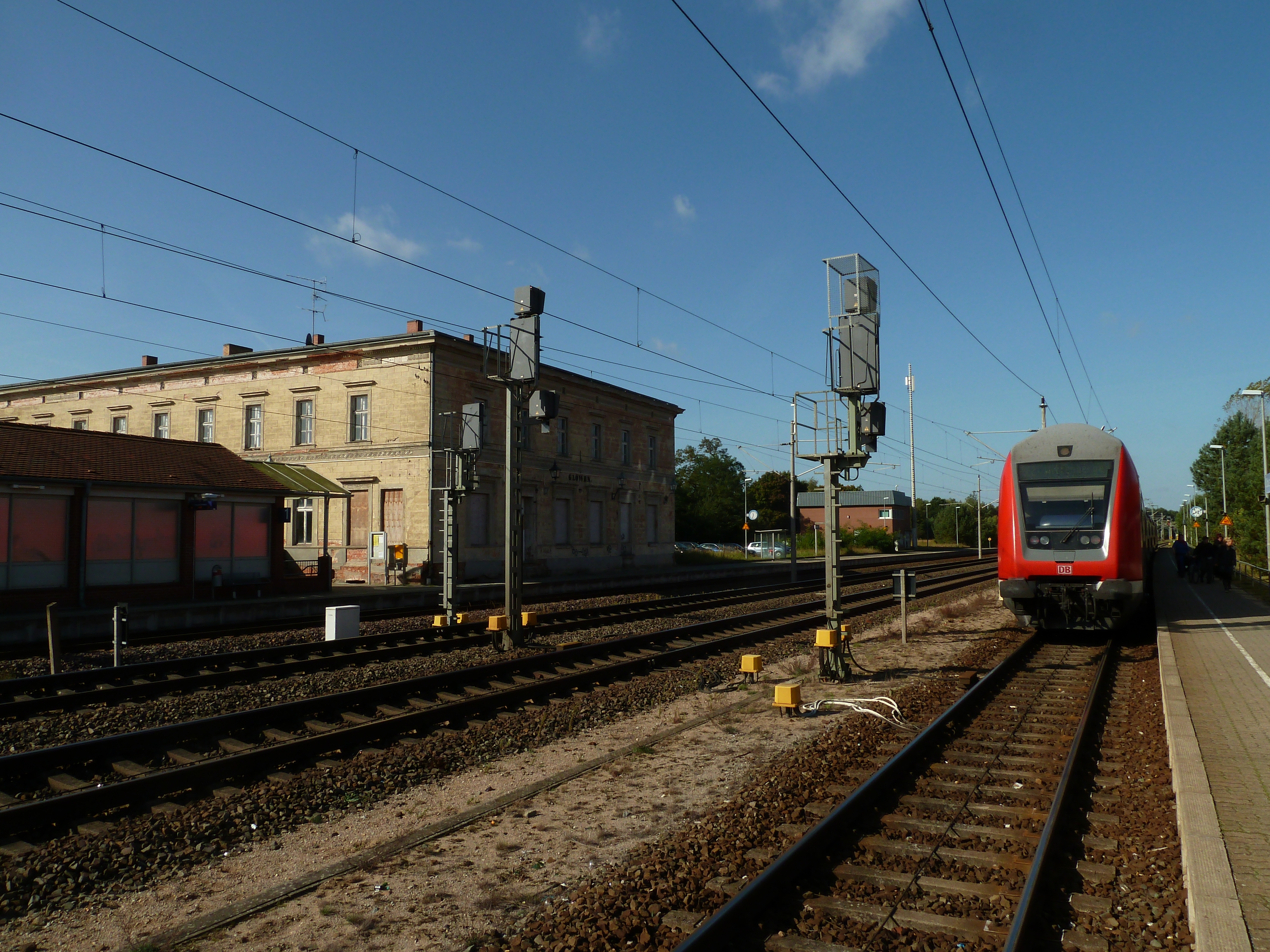
View from the platform for trains to Wittenberge towards the station building

Originally both platforms were accessible from the station building. Since the renovation in the 1990s, the station has two outside platforms that are connected by a pedestrian tunnel. The two main through tracks run between the two platform tracks. As part of the further upgrade of the line after 2000 an underpass was built for the highway, which had previously crossed the railway tracks over a level crossing.

The tracks for the handling of freight lie on the north side of the tracks. The freight dispatch building, which also dated from the early days of the station and was built in a style then typical for the region with brick and a half-timbered element with a wide overhanging roof above the loading platform, making a contrast to the entrance building, no longer exists. Three tracks still exist in the area north of the platforms and are available and connected from the west. East of the highway there is a track for loading and unloading.

Formerly there was a platform on the tracks of the now closed line to Havelberg to the west of the station building.

The dismantled tracks of the narrow-gauge railway towards Pritzwalk and Lindenberg were located north of the tracks of the main line. To the east of the present federal highway on the main line towards Lindenberg was the platform with a small entrance building, which is now (as of 2012) used as a local club. The facilities for freight and for changing locomotives were west of the highway next to the freight facilities of the main line. There was no track connection to the narrow-gauge tracks or to the line to Havelberg, which was also rebuilt to narrow gauge after the Second World War. Vehicles were transported by standard-gauge transfer wagons between the two parts of the station.

== Train services ==
The station was served hourly by the following service in 2026:

RE 8: Wismar – Schwerin – Ludwigslust – Wittenberge – Glöwen – Berlin – – Potsdamer Platz – Südkreuz –Wünsdorf-Waldstadt – Elsterwerda
