= Rostock Thierfelder Straße station =

Railway station in Rostock, Germany

Rostock Thierfelder Straße
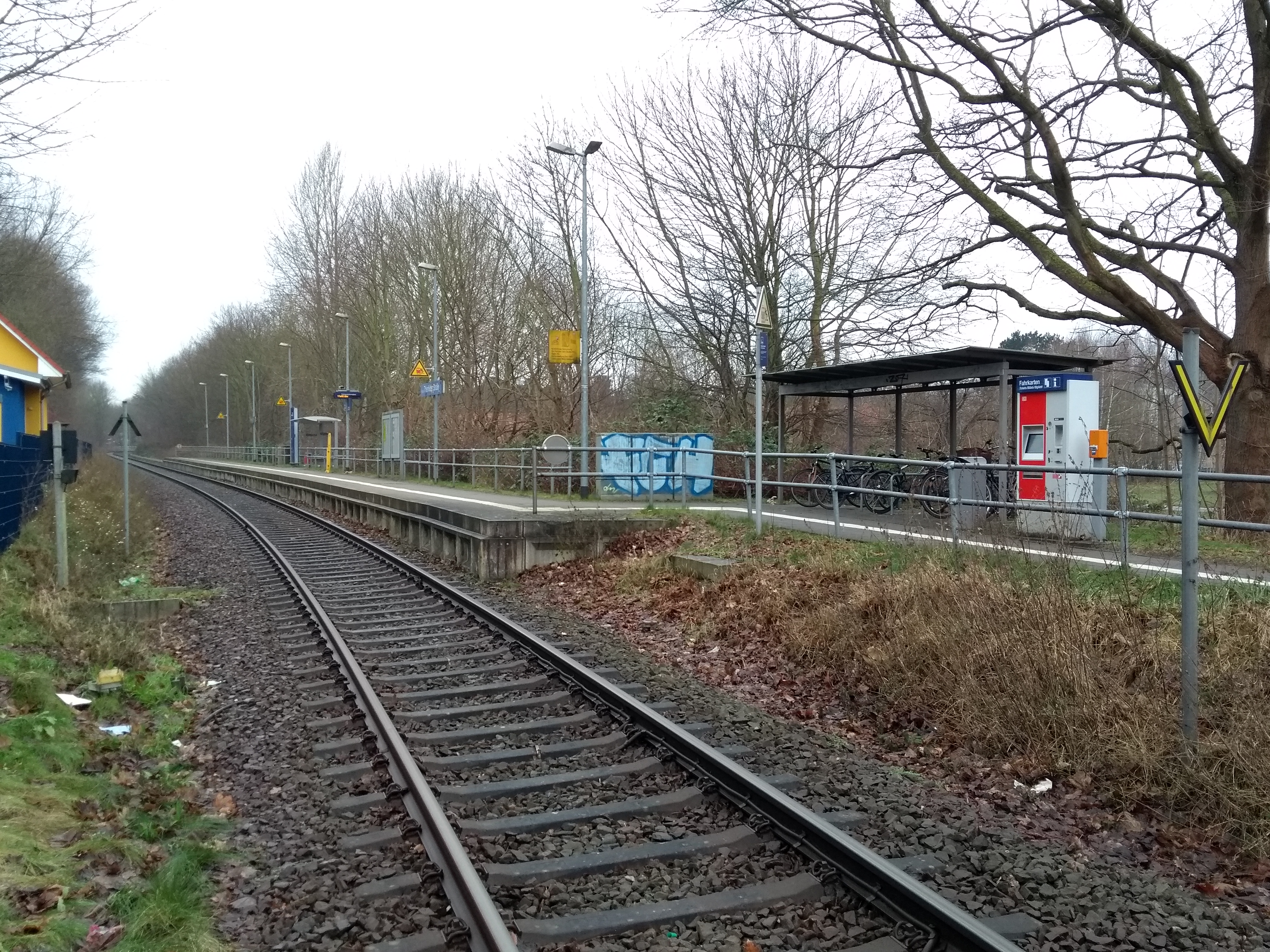
- 2018

General information
- Location: Thierfelder Straße 1; 18059 Rostock; Mecklenburg-Vorpommern
- Coordinates: 54°04′40″N 12°06′00″E
- Owner: DB Netz
- Operator: DB Station&Service
- Line: Wismar–Rostock railway
- Platforms: 1
- Tracks: 1
- Train operators: DB Regio Nordost

Other information
- Station code: 7984
- DS100 code: WRTF
- IBNR: 8079629
- Category: 7
- Website: www.bahnhof.de

History
- Opened: 2000; 26 years ago

Services
Preceding station	DB Regio Nordost	Following station
Groß Schwaß towards Wismar	RB 11	Rostock Hbf towards Tessin
Groß Schwaß towards Bad Doberan	RB 12	Rostock Hbf towards Graal-Müritz
Location
- Location within Mecklenburg-Vorpommern

Rostock Thierfelder Straße station is a railway station in the town of Rostock, Mecklenburg-Vorpommern, Germany.

== Trivia ==
Rostock Thierfelder Straße station is written in all documents by Deutsche Bahn in this form, although the corresponding street was named after a person (Theodor Thierfelder) whose street is called therefore Thierfelderstraße.
