= Moidentin station =

Railway stop in Dorf Mecklenburg, Germany

Moidentin
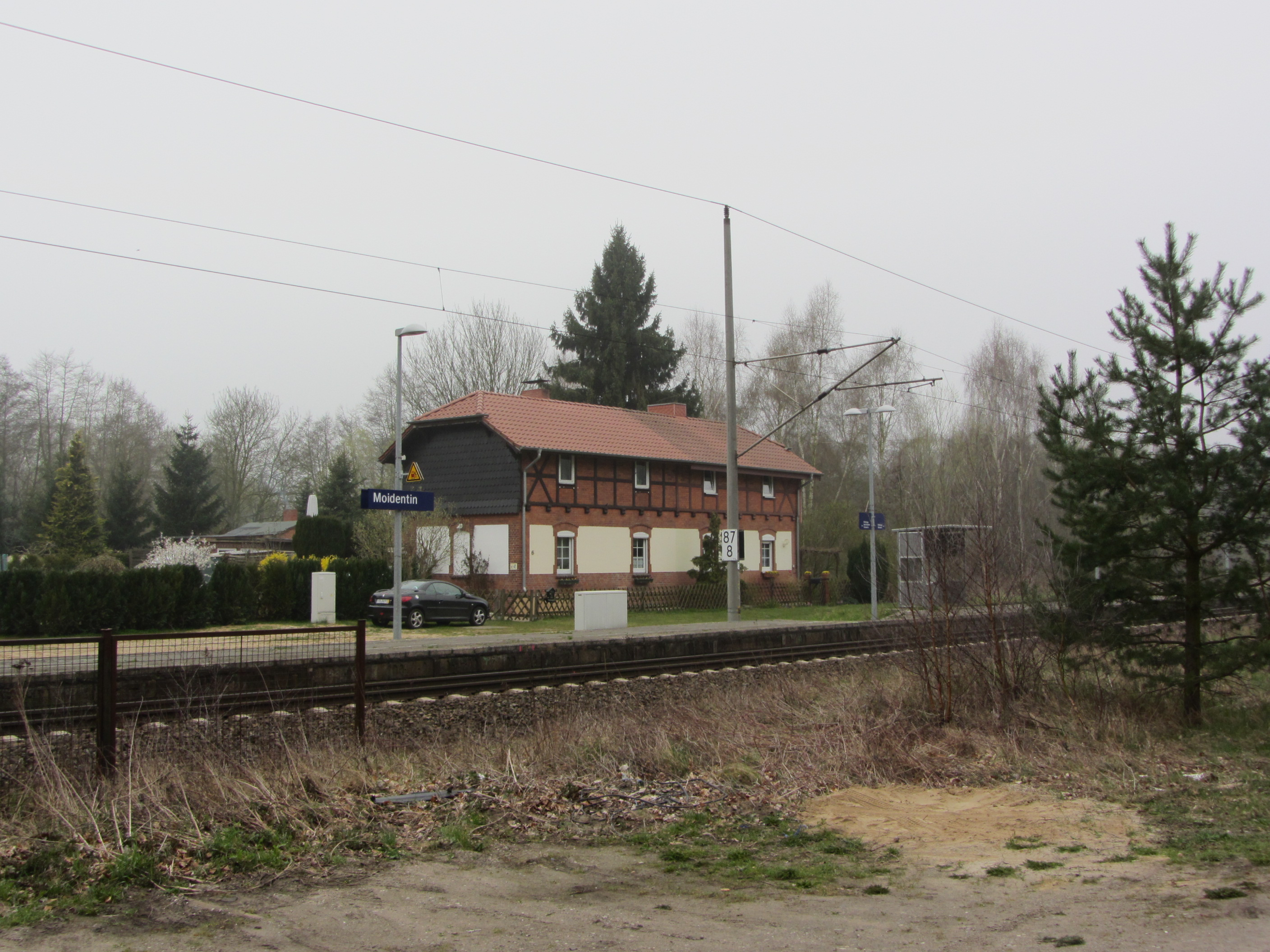
- 2014

General information
- Location: Am Bahnhof 21; 23966 Dorf Mecklenburg; Mecklenburg-Vorpommern; Germany
- Coordinates: 53°48′23″N 11°28′55″E
- Owner: Deutsche Bahn
- Operator: DB Station&Service
- Lines: Ludwigslust–Wismar railway (KBS 202)
- Platforms: 1 side platform
- Tracks: 1
- Train operators: DB Regio Nordost; ODEG

Construction
- Parking: yes
- Cycle facilities: no
- Accessible: yes

Other information
- Station code: 4155
- DS100 code: WMOI
- IBNR: 8012384
- Category: 6
- Website: www.bahnhof.de

History
- Electrified: 30 May 1987; 39 years ago

Services
Preceding station	DB Regio Nordost	Following station
Dorf Mecklenburg towards Wismar	RB 17	Bad Kleinen towards Ludwigslust
Location
- Location within Mecklenburg-Vorpommern Location within Germany Location within Europe

Moidentin station is a railway station in the Moidentin part of the municipality of Dorf Mecklenburg, located in the Nordwestmecklenburg district in Mecklenburg-Vorpommern, Germany.
