= Bad Wilsnack station =

Railway station in Brandenburg, Germany

Bad Wilsnack
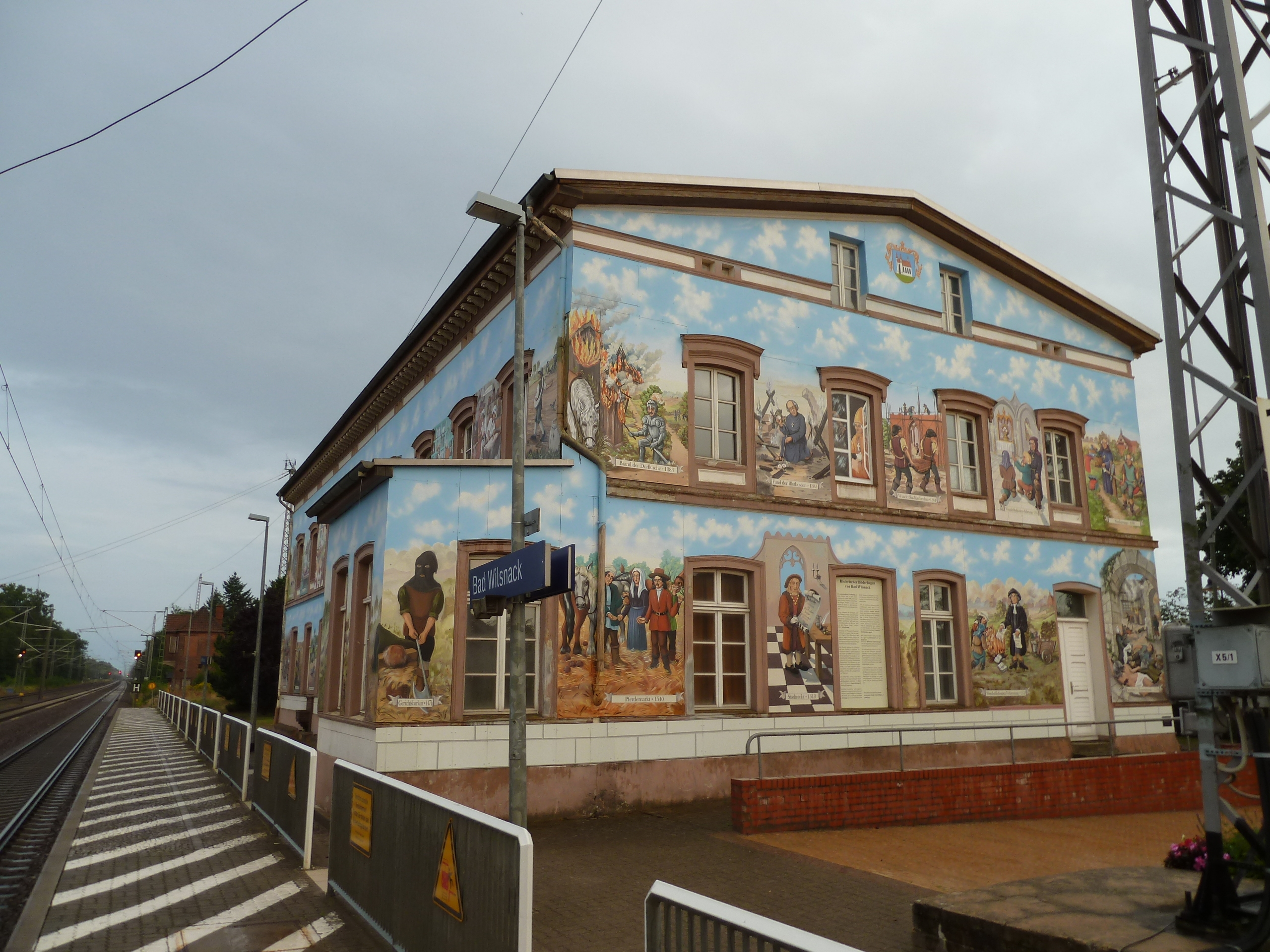
- 2012

General information
- Location: Am Bahnhof 1; 19336 Bad Wilsnack; Brandenburg; Germany
- Coordinates: 52.96°N 11.95°E
- Owner: Deutsche Bahn
- Operator: DB Station&Service
- Lines: Berlin–Hamburg Railway (KBS 204)
- Platforms: 2 side platforms
- Tracks: 3
- Train operators: ODEG
- Connections: 950 955 958 960 972 976

Construction
- Parking: yes
- Cycle facilities: yes
- Accessible: yes

Other information
- Station code: 363
- DS100 code: WWIL
- IBNR: 8011088
- Category: 6
- Fare zone: : 4533
- Website: www.bahnhof.de

Services
Preceding station	Ostdeutsche Eisenbahn	Following station
Wittenberge towards Wismar	RE 8	Glöwen towards Elsterwerda
Location
- Location within Brandenburg Location within Germany Location within Europe

Bad Wilsnack station (German: Bahnhof Bad Wilsnack) is a railway station in the municipality of Bad Wilsnack, located in the Prignitz district in Brandenburg, Germany.

== Notable places nearby ==
- Holy Blood of Wilsnack
