= Rostock Hauptbahnhof =

Railway station in Rostock, Germany

Rostock Hbf
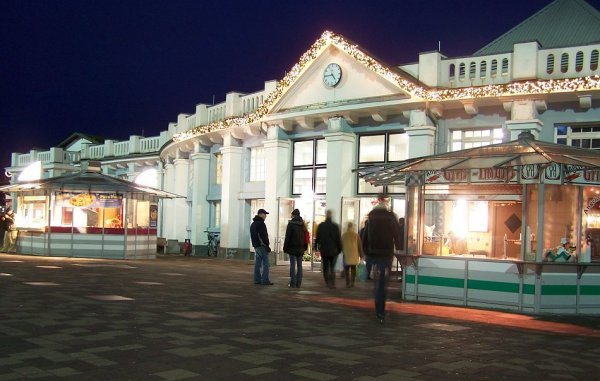

General information
- Location: Konrad-Adenauer-Platz 1, Steintor-Vorstadt, Rostock, Mecklenburg-Vorpommern; Germany
- Coordinates: 54°04′41″N 12°07′51″E
- Owner: Deutsche Bahn
- Operator: DB Netz; DB Station&Service
- Lines: Bad Kleinen–Rostock (KBS 100); Warnemünde–Neustrelitz (KBS 181); Rostock Hbf–Rostock Seehafen Nord (KBS 183); Rostock–Stralsund (KBS 184); Wismar–Rostock (KBS 185); Rostock–Tessin (KBS 185)
- Platforms: 11
- Train operators: DB Fernverkehr, DB Regio Nordost, Ostdeutsche Eisenbahn GmbH, RSAG
- Connections: S1 S2 S2X S3; Tramway: 2, 3, 5, 6; Bus: 22, 27, 39 (Hbf South); 22, 23, 27 (Hbf North); 102, 106, 112, 113, 120, 121, 123, 284 (ZOB)

Construction
- Accessible: Yes

Other information
- Station code: 5365
- DS100 code: WR
- IBNR: 8010304
- Category: 2
- Website: www.bahnhof.de

History
- Opened: 1 June 1886; 140 years ago
- Electrified: 18 May 1985; 41 years ago
- Former names: 1886–1896: Lloyd-Bahnhof; 1896–1910 Central-Bahnhof / Zentralbahnhof
Services
| Preceding station | DB Fernverkehr | Following station |
|---|---|---|
| Terminus | IC 17 | Waren (Müritz) towards Dresden Hbf or Chemnitz Hbf |
| Terminus | ICE 25 | Schwerin Hbf towards München Hbf |
| Reverses direction | ICE 33 | Ribnitz-Damgarten West towards Ostseebad Binz or Greifswald |
| Reverses direction | ICE 33 | Bützow towards Hamburg-Altona |
| Warnemünde Terminus | IC 57 | Bützow towards Magdeburg Hbf or Leipzig Hbf |
| Preceding station | DB Regio Nordost | Following station |
| Terminus | RE 1 | Schwaan towards Hamburg Hbf |
| Terminus | RE 5 | Güstrow towards Berlin Südkreuz |
| Terminus | RE 50 | Güstrow towards Neustrelitz Hbf |
| Rostock Thierfelder Straße towards Wismar | RB 11 | Roggentin towards Tessin |
| Rostock Thierfelder Straße towards Bad Doberan | RB 12 | Rostock-Kassebohm towards Graal-Müritz |
| Terminus | RB 17 | Schwaan towards Schwerin Hbf or Ludwigslust |
| Preceding station | Ostdeutsche Eisenbahn | Following station |
| Terminus | RE 9 | Rövershagen towards Sassnitz or Ostseebad Binz |
| Terminus | RE 10 | Rövershagen towards Pasewalk |
| Preceding station | Rostock S-Bahn | Following station |
| Parkstraße towards Warnemünde | S1 | Terminus |
| Parkstraße towards Warnemünde | S2 | Papendorf towards Güstrow |
| Terminus | S2X | Güstrow Terminus |
| Parkstraße towards Warnemünde | S3 | Kavelstorf towards Güstrow |
| Preceding station | Rostock Tramway | Following station |
| Rosa-Luxemburg-Straße towards Reutershagen | 2 | Stadthalle towards Kurt-Schuhmacher-Ring |
| Rosa-Luxemburg-Straße towards Neuer Friedhof | 3 | Stadthalle towards Dierkower Allee |
| Rosa-Luxemburg-Straße towards Mecklenburger Allee | 5 | Stadthalle towards Südblick |
| Rosa-Luxemburg-Straße towards Neuer Friedhof | 6 | Stadthalle towards Campus Südstadt |
Location

Rostock Hauptbahnhof, also Rostock Central Station (from 1896 until the turn of the 20th century called Rostock Central-Bahnhof), is the main railway station in the German city of Rostock. It is situated well to the south of the city centre, to which it is linked by tram. The station was opened in 1886 by the Deutsch-Nordischer Lloyd, operating a combined railway/ferry line to Nykøbing Falster in Denmark. The station was expanded in 1913 and 1922, but was heavily damaged in World War II. The importance of the traditional route to Hamburg and Copenhagen diminished after the post-World War II division of Germany, with long-distance services instead focusing on cities within the German Democratic Republic. Electrification reached the station in 1985. After German reunification, the station was extensively modernised.

== History ==
Today's station was opened in 1886 by the Deutsch-Nordische-Lloyd (German-Nordic-Lloyd) Railway Company as the Lloyd-Bahnhof (“station of the Lloyd Railway”). The company operated the Lloyd Railway on the Neustrelitz–Rostock–Warnemünde route and the subsequent mail steamer connection to Nykøbing Falster. In 1894, the Lloyd Railway was acquired by the Grand Duchy of Mecklenburg-Schwerin and incorporated in the Grand Duchy of Mecklenburg Friedrich-Franz Railway (Großherzoglich Mecklenburgische Friedrich-Franz-Eisenbahn, MFFE), which already owned a large station in Rostock. The parallel operation of passenger and freight traffic proved to be inefficient.

In 1896, the station of the Lloyd Railway was assigned to handle most of the movement of passengers and was converted into the Central-Bahnhof (central station) and after the turn of the 20th century it was renamed Rostock Hauptbahnhof (main station).

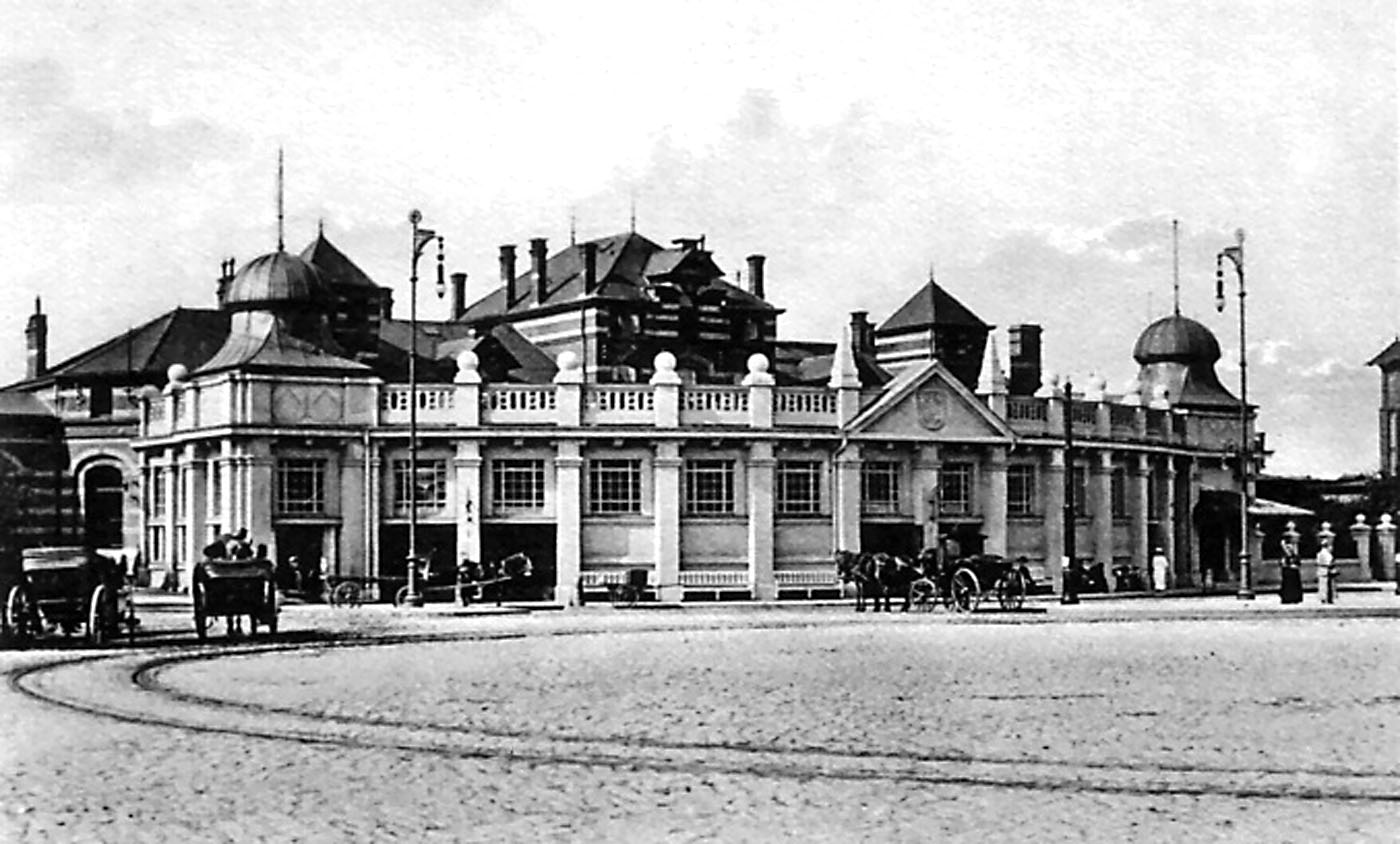
Northern entrance in 1920

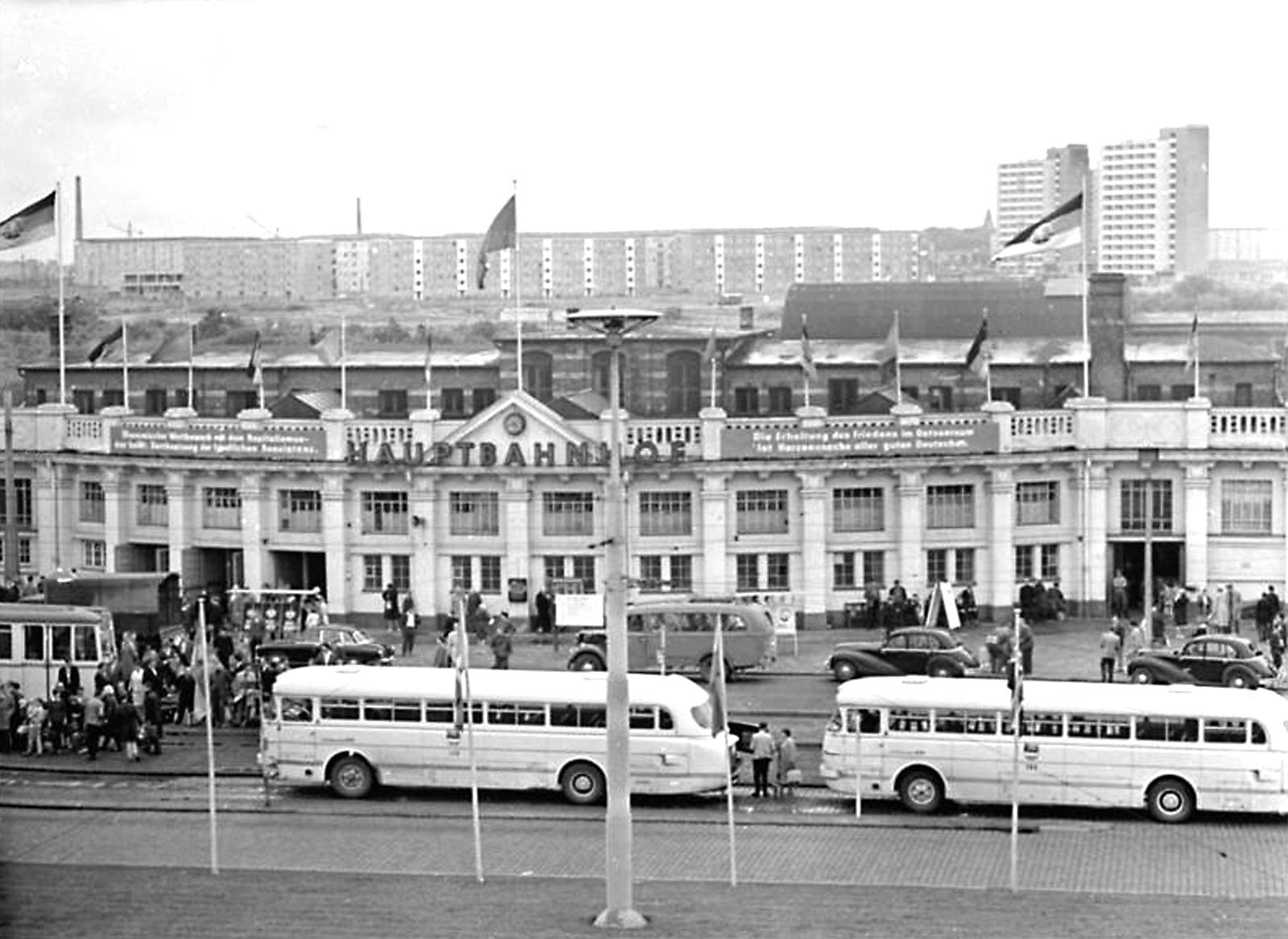
Entrance building and station forecourt on the north side, 1964

With the establishment of the train ferry between Warnemünde and Gedser in 1903, long-distance express trains between Berlin and Copenhagen stopped at the station. After the reconstruction of the approach of the line towards Stralsund, trains to and from Stralsund no longer stopped at the station of the Friedrich-Franz Railway, which subsequently became the Rostock freight yard.

In 1913, the station entrance hall was redeveloped with Art Nouveau elements and small balustrades to a design by Paul Korff. The platform facilities were extended in 1922 to include two platform tracks and the station subway was extended accordingly.

The station was damaged by bombing in the Second World War. There was a temporary reconstruction.

The importance of Rostock and the station increased as a result of the division of Germany. Passenger numbers rose sharply, especially after the establishment of new industrial enterprises and residential areas in the north-west of the city. The importance of north–south long-distance connections to Dresden, Leipzig and Berlin also grew. Direct trains were established to Prague and Budapest. Rostock's "traditional" long-distance connections to Hamburg and Copenhagen were very limited after the division of Germany in 1949. Improvisation was required for the expansion of the station, while avoiding another move in its location. More platforms were built to cope with the increasing ridership. An exit was built on the station subway towards the south of the city. The station was connected to the electrified network of Deutsche Reichsbahn in 1985.

There was a shift of traffic flows with the reunification of Germany. On the one hand, traffic moved from the railways to the road and, on the other hand, the importance of connections to Hamburg and Kiel (via Lübeck) grew strongly. The direct long-distance connections to Dresden, Magdeburg and Leipzig were abandoned up to the mid-1990s and the connection to Copenhagen was also abandoned with the closing of the rail ferry away to Gedser. The Rostock–Berlin connection became a regional service.

=== Rebuilding the station ===
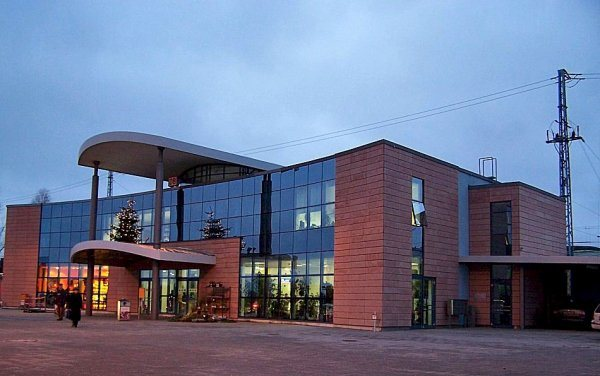
New southern station building, built 1999-2003

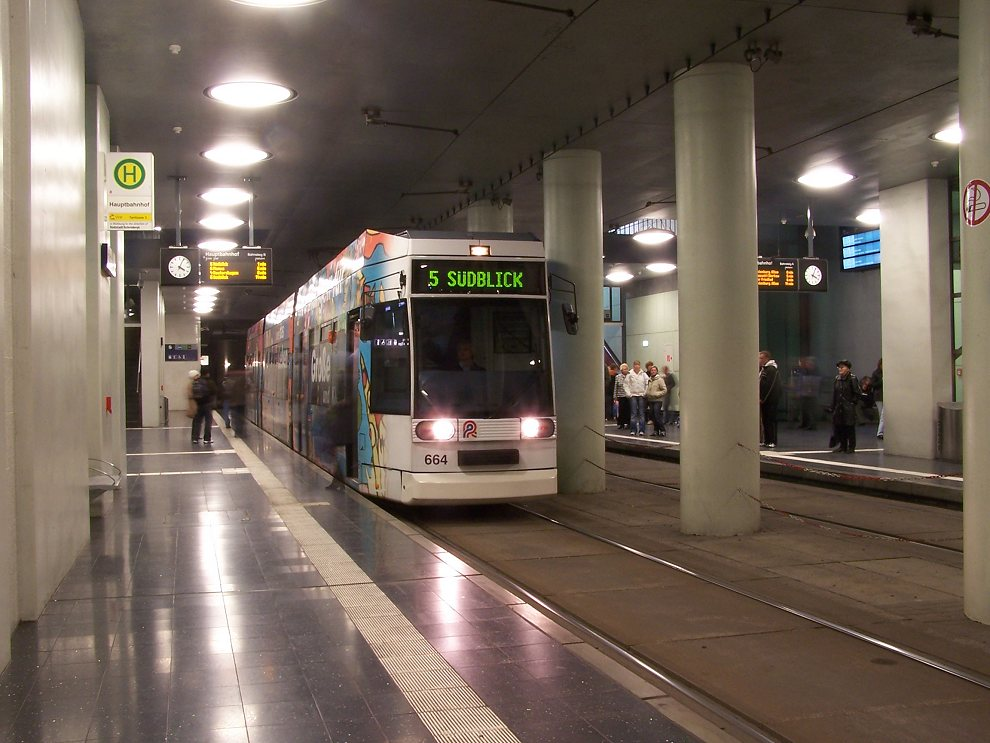
Tram station on the underground level

Due to the limited capacity of the station there were already plans in the East German period for a renovation of the station or even the building of a new central station.

In the general transport plan of the 1960s for the city, a new through station was provided near the suburb of Brinckmansdorf where trains from Stralsund could continue towards the south without reversing. Freight traffic would have been completely separated from passenger traffic. The project was not realized.

Planning around 1980 provided for the demolition of the station building that was built between the tracks to make room for island platforms. A new platform would also have been built on the north side of the station. The entrance would have stayed there, but the main entrance would have moved to the south side of the station, where a new station building was planned.

During the renovation of the station from 1999 to 2003, somewhat similar ideas were realized. The station building on the north side was rebuilt incorporating the old entrance hall. A new subterranean level was added with a tram tunnel and a small southern entrance building. The station building at the centre of the tracks was demolished except for a small part. A direct connection from long-distance and regional service to the tramway is now possible on two levels under the tracks. A new island platform was built for the S-Bahn and new platform numbering was introduced. The station has been served by a pair of Intercity-Express services since 11 June 2007.

== Infrastructure ==
Since the renovation in the early 21st century, the station has a main entrance building on the north side of the railway tracks and a smaller entrance building on the south side. The platforms with eleven platform tracks are reached via a subterranean level between the two entrance buildings. The Rostock tram station with two platforms is on a second subterranean level.

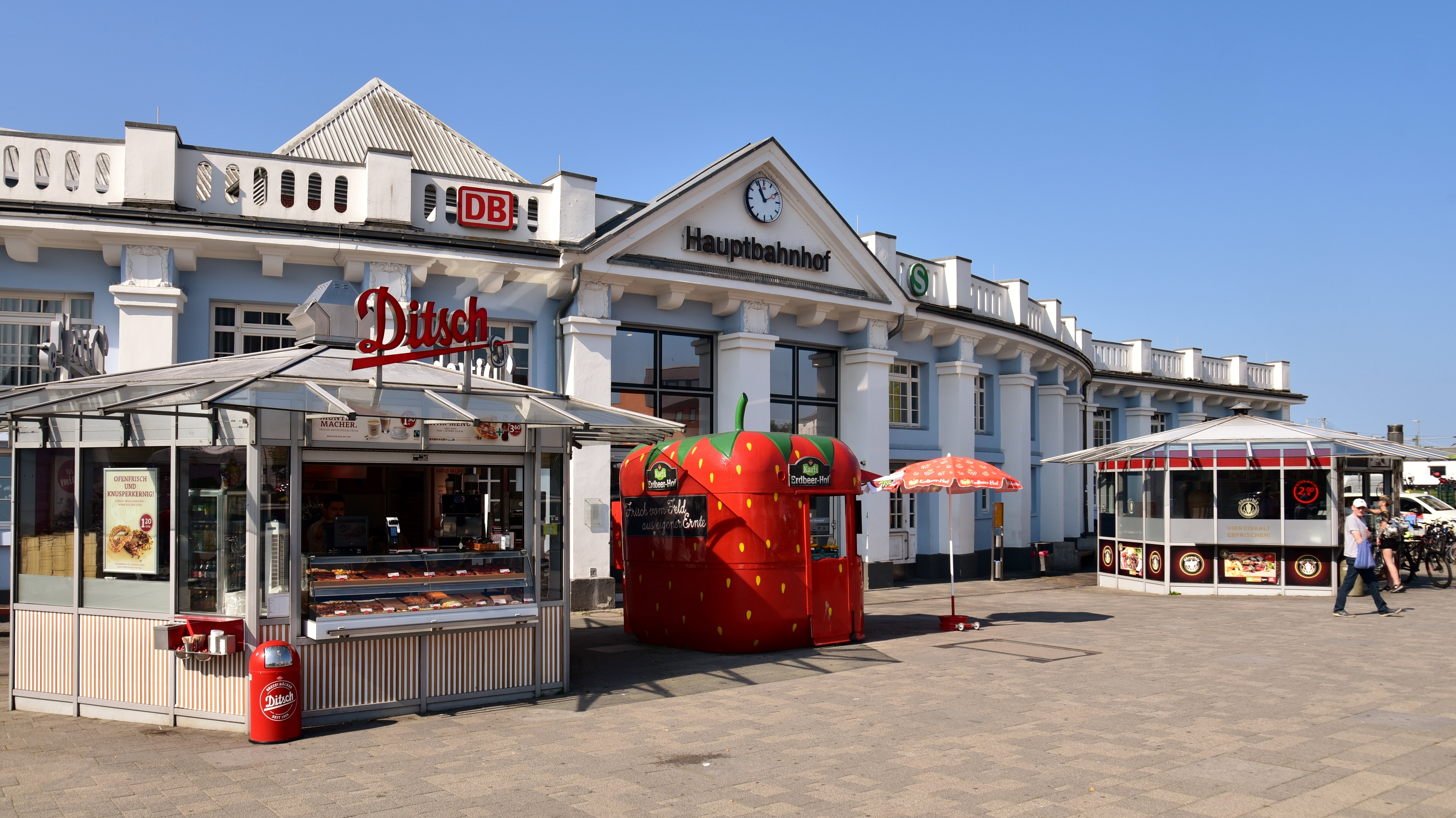
The main entrance building in 2019

The platforms are arranged as follows: south-west of the main station building is an island platform with tracks 1 and 2, which are mainly used by the trains of the Rostock S-Bahn. This is followed by a wide island platform served by trains on through tracks 3 on the northeast side and track 7 on the southwest side. Previously this platform was the location of the original entrance building, which was demolished to a large extent during the reconstruction up to 2000. At the eastern end of this platform, are the bay platforms of tracks 4 and 5 and at the western end is the bay platform track 6, which was taken into operation in December 2012 and is occasionally used by S-Bahn trains to Warnemünde. To the southwest these are followed by another two island platforms with tracks 8 and 9 and tracks 10 and 11 respectively.

The entrance building that stood until the late 20th century was a heritage-listed building. Since the reconstruction of the station, it is no longer included in the lists of monuments.

== Rail services ==
In the 2026 timetable the following lines stop at the station:

=== Long distance ===
| Line | Route | Frequency |
|---|---|---|
| IC 17 | Warnemünde – Rostock – Neustrelitz – Berlin – Elsterwerda – Dresden (– Freiberg – Chemnitz) | Every two hours |
| ICE 25 | Rostock – Schwerin – Hamburg – Hanover – Würzburg – Nuremberg – Munich | Once a day |
| ICE 33 | (Greifswald/Binz – Stralsund –) Rostock – Schwerin – Hamburg – Hamburg-Altona | Every 2 hours |
| IC 57 | Warnemünde – Rostock – Magdeburg – Halle – Leipzig | Two train pairs |

=== Regional services ===
| Line | Route | Frequency |
|---|---|---|
| RE 1 | Rostock – Bützow – Bad Kleinen – Schwerin – Büchen – Hamburg | Every 2 hours with additional trains in the peak |
| RE 5 | Rostock – Güstrow – Neustrelitz – Berlin – BER Airport – Wünsdorf-Waldstadt – Finsterwalde – Elsterwerda | Every 2 hours |
| RE 9 | Rostock – Ribnitz-Damgarten – Stralsund – Bergen auf Rügen – Sassnitz | Every 2 hours |
| RE 10 | Rostock – Ribnitz-Damgarten – Stralsund – Greifswald – Züssow | Individual services |
| RE 50 | Rostock – Güstrow – Neustrelitz | Every 2 hours |
| RB 11 | Wismar – Neubukow – Kröpelin – Bad Doberan – Parkentin – Groß Schwaß – Rostock – Tessin | Hourly (request halt in Sandhagen, Teschow u. Kalsow) |
| RB 12 | (Bad Doberan –) Rostock – Graal-Müritz (/ – Ribnitz-Damgarten West) | Hourly on weekends in the winter every 2 hours, Bad Doberan/Ribnitz-Damgarten West – Rostock only in the peak |
| RB 17 | Rostock – Bützow – Bad Kleinen – Schwerin – Ludwigslust | Individual services |
| S1 | Warnemünde – Rostock | Every 15 minutes together with S2, S3, every 7.5 minutes in the peak |
| S2 | Warnemünde – Rostock – Schwaan – Güstrow | Hourly every 2 hours on the weekend |
| S3 | Warnemünde – Rostock – Laage (Meckl) – Güstrow | Hourly every 2 hours on the weekend |

=== Tramway services ===
| Line | Route |
|---|---|
| 2 | Reutershagen – Holbeinplatz – Doberaner Platz – Goetheplatz – Hauptbahnhof – Steintor – Dierkower Kreuz – Kurt-Schumacher-Ring |
| 3 | (Neuer Friedhof – Zoo –) Platz der Jugend – Parkstraße – Doberaner Platz – Goetheplatz – Hauptbahnhof – Steintor – Dierkower Kreuz – Dierkower Allee |
| 5 | Lichtenhagen, Mecklenburger Allee – Lütten Klein Zentrum – Thomas-Morus-Straße – Marienehe – Reutershagen – Holbeinplatz – Doberaner Platz – Lange Str. – Steintor – Hauptbahnhof – Südstadt-Center – Südblickl |
| 6 | Neuer Friedhof – Zoo – Platz der Jugend – Parkstraße – Doberaner Platz – Lange Str. – Steintor – Hauptbahnhof – Südstadt-Center – Campus Südstadt |

== See also ==
- Rail transport in Germany
- Railway stations in Germany
