= WMK =

WMK may refer to:

- Weis Markets, the NYSE code WMK
- Dorf Mecklenburg station, the DS100 code WMK
- Watt per metre-kelvin or W/(m K), a unit of thermal conductivity
