= Petersdorf station =

German railway station

Petersdorf
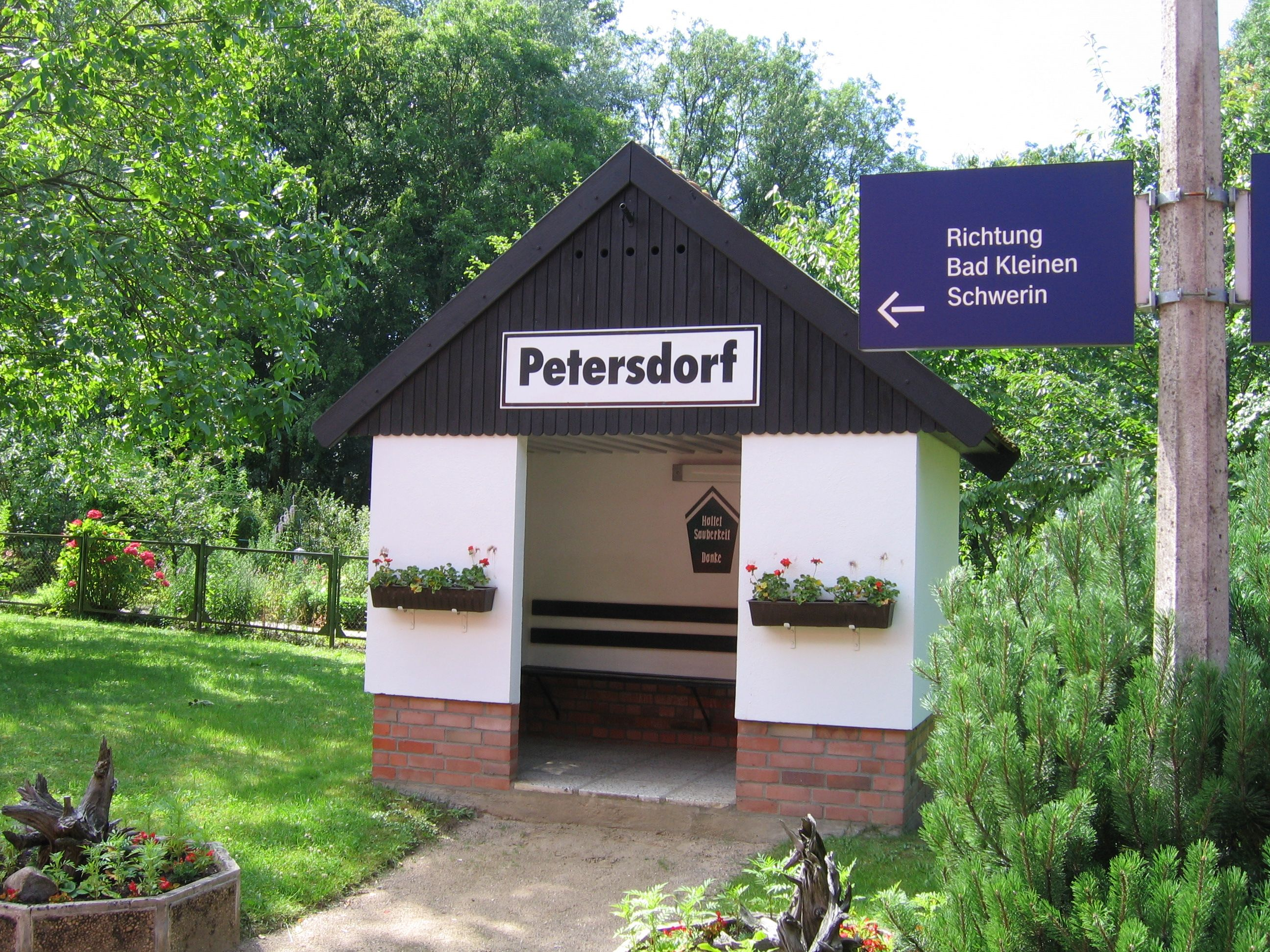
- 2009

General information
- Location: Petersdorf; 23966 Dorf Mecklenburg; Mecklenburg-Vorpommern; Germany
- Coordinates: 53°49′19″N 11°28′37″E
- Owner: Deutsche Bahn
- Operator: DB Station&Service
- Lines: Ludwigslust–Wismar railway (KBS 202)
- Platforms: 1 side platform
- Tracks: 1

Construction
- Parking: yes
- Cycle facilities: no
- Accessible: yes

Other information
- Station code: -
- DS100 code: WPDF
- IBNR: -
- Category: -
- Website: www.bahnhof.de

History
- Closed: 9 December 2012; 13 years ago
- Electrified: 30 May 1987; 39 years ago
Location
- Location within Mecklenburg-Vorpommern Location within Germany Location within Europe

Petersdorf station was a railway station in the Petersdorf part of the municipality of Dorf Mecklenburg, located in the Nordwestmecklenburg district in Mecklenburg-Vorpommern, Germany.

== History ==
The Petersdorf stop was abandoned for the timetable change in December 2012, as extensive expansion measures would have been necessary for continued operation.
