= Perleberg station =

Railway station in Perleberg, Germany

Perleberg
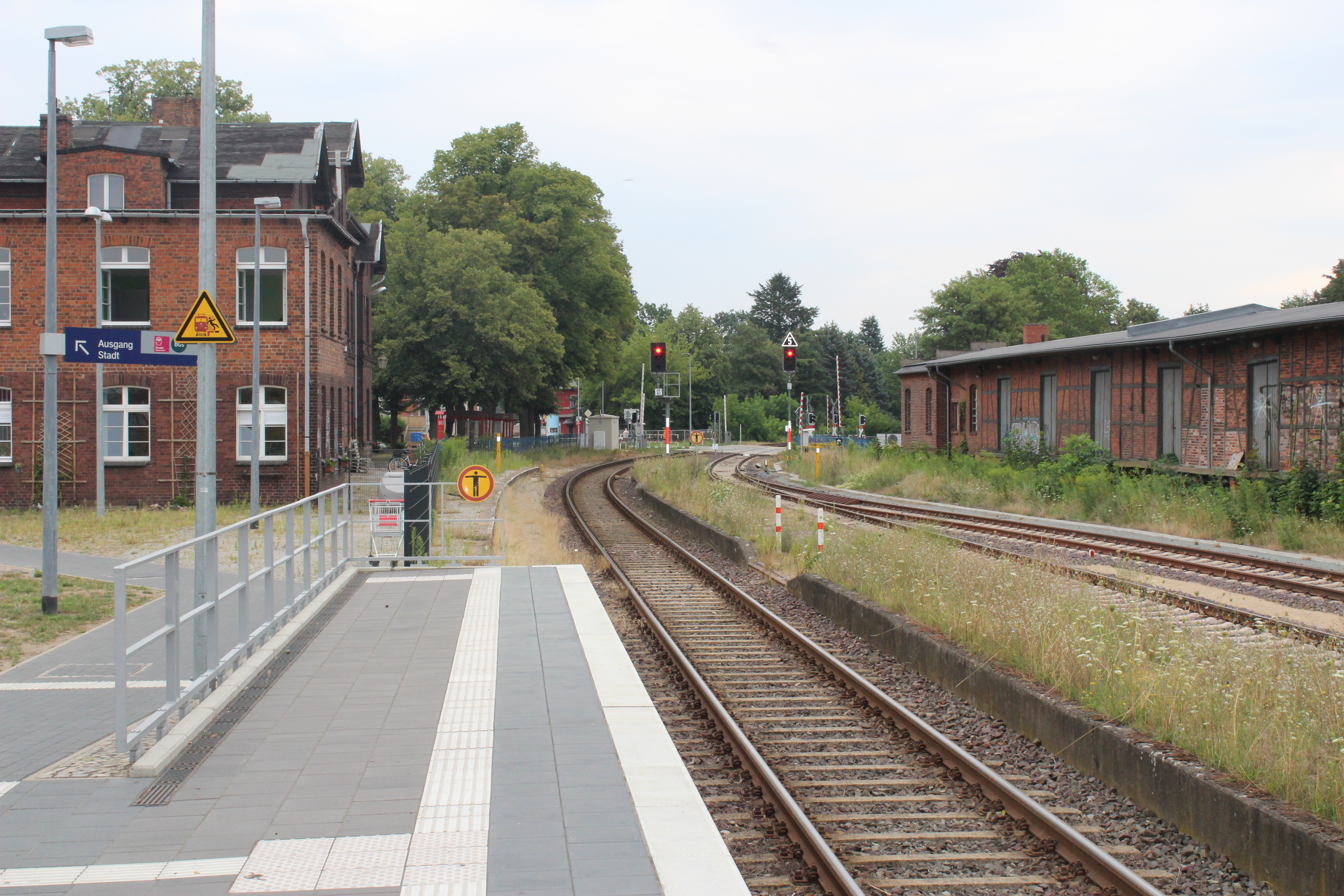
- 2019

General information
- Location: Lenzener Straße; Wittenberger Straße; 19348 Perleberg; Brandenburg; Germany
- Coordinates: 53.0714°N 11.8522°E
- Owner: Deutsche Bahn
- Operator: DB Station&Service
- Lines: Wittenberge–Strasburg railway (KBS 206)
- Platforms: 1 side platform
- Tracks: 3
- Train operators: DB Regio Nordost
- Connections: RE 6; 935 941 945 946 947 949 950 955 974 975 977 978

Construction
- Parking: yes
- Cycle facilities: yes
- Accessible: yes

Other information
- Station code: 4899
- DS100 code: WPB
- IBNR: 8012622
- Category: 6
- Fare zone: VBB: 4232
- Website: www.bahnhof.de

Services
Preceding station	DB Regio Nordost	Following station
Weisen towards Wittenberge	RE 6	Groß Pankow towards Berlin-Charlottenburg
Location
- Location within Brandenburg Location within Germany Location within Europe

Perleberg station (German: Bahnhof Perleberg) is a railway station in the municipality of Perleberg, located in the Prignitz district in Brandenburg, Germany.
