= Rostock-Kassebohm station =

Railway station in Rostock, Germany

Rostock-Kassebohm
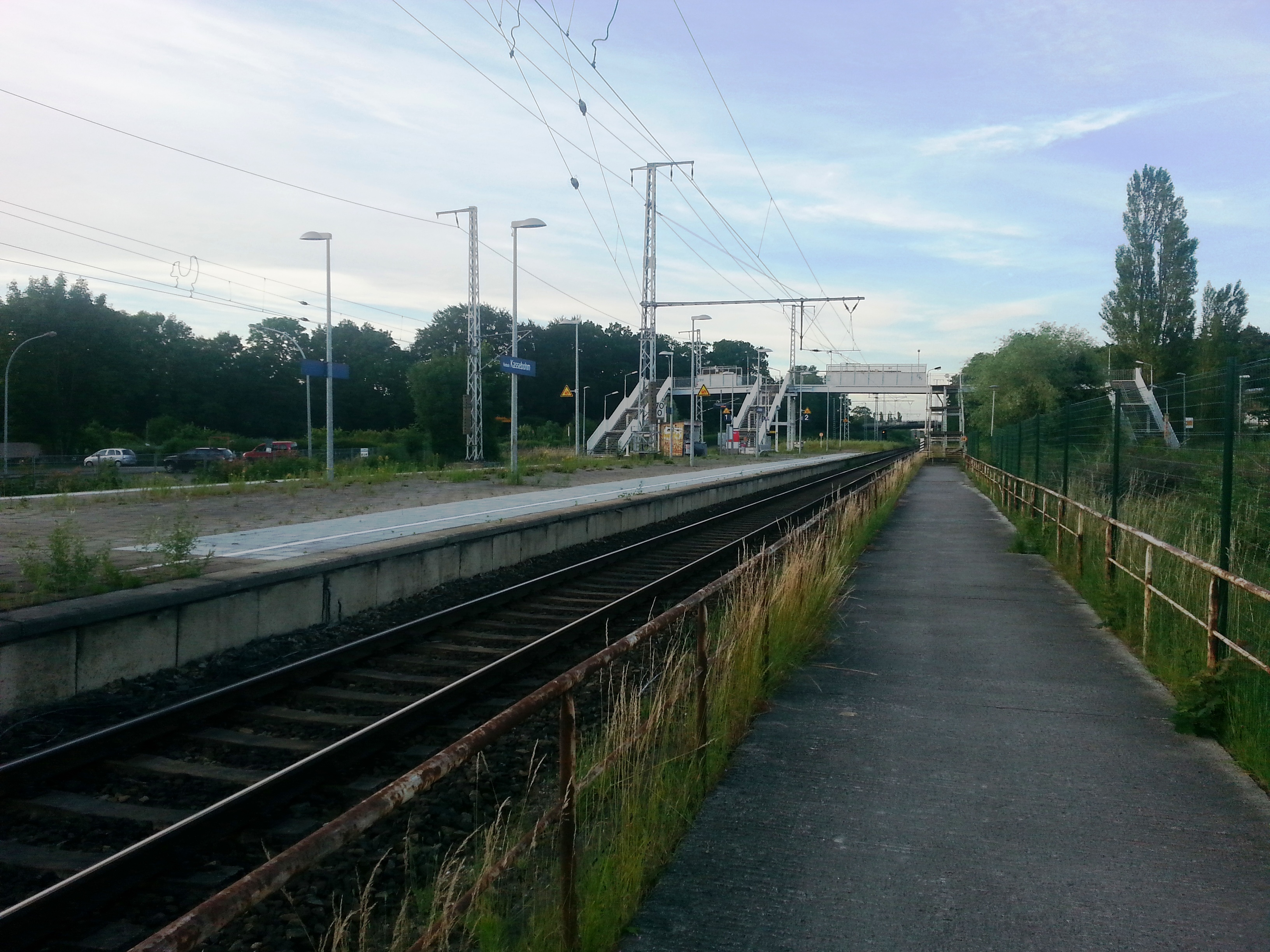
- 2017

General information
- Location: Robert-Beltz-Weg; 18055 Rostock; Mecklenburg-Vorpommern; Germany
- Coordinates: 54°04′46″N 12°09′48″E
- Owner: DB Netz
- Operator: DB Station&Service
- Lines: Stralsund–Rostock railway (KBS 190)
- Platforms: 1 island platform
- Tracks: 2
- Train operators: DB Regio Nordost

Other information
- Station code: 5368
- DS100 code: WRK
- IBNR: 8012806
- Category: 6
- Website: www.bahnhof.de

History
- Opened: 1988
- Electrified: from the start

Services
Preceding station	DB Regio Nordost	Following station
Rostock Hbf towards Bad Doberan	RB 12	Bentwisch towards Graal-Müritz
Location
- Location within Mecklenburg-Vorpommern Location within Germany Location within Europe

Rostock-Kassebohm station is a railway station in the town of Rostock, Mecklenburg-Vorpommern, Germany.
