= Wittenberge station =

Railway station in Wittenberge, Germany

Wittenberge
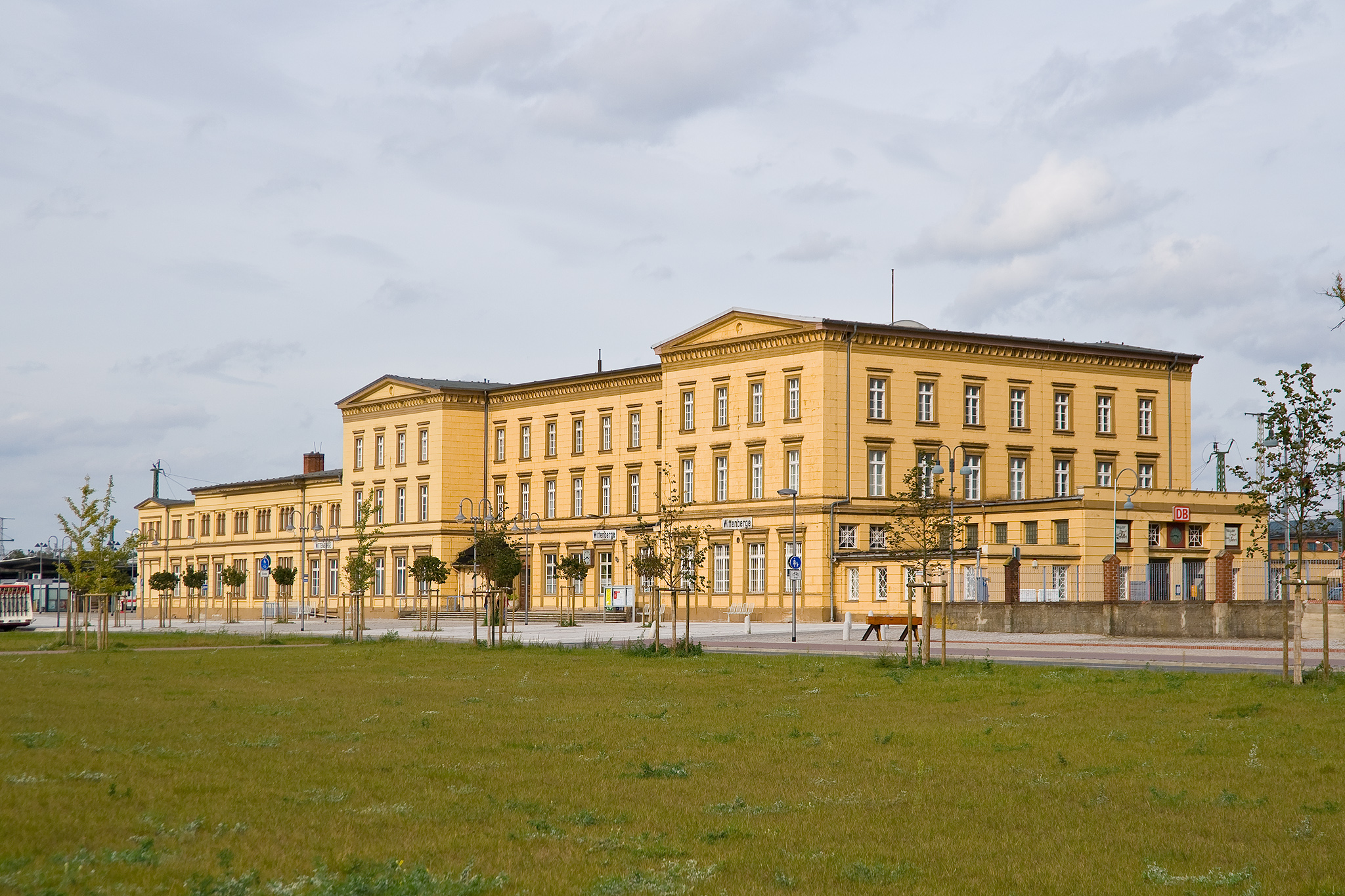

General information
- Location: Am Bahnhof 1, Wittenberge, Brandenburg; Germany
- Coordinates: 53°00′07″N 11°45′46″E
- Owner: Deutsche Bahn
- Operator: DB Station&Service
- Lines: Berlin–Hamburg (KBS 204); Wittenberge–Wittstock (KBS 206); Magdeburg–Wittenberge (KBS 305); Wittenberge–Lüneburg (closed)
- Platforms: 5

Construction
- Accessible: Yes
- Architectural style: Neoclassical

Other information
- Station code: 6825
- DS100 code: WW
- IBNR: 8010382
- Category: 3
- Fare zone: VBB: 4430
- Website: www.bahnhof.de

History
- Opened: 15 October 1846; 179 years ago
- Electrified: 30 May 1987; 39 years ago, 15 kV 16 2/3 Hz AC system (overhead)

Passengers
- < 5,000
Services
Preceding station	DB Fernverkehr	Following station
Ludwigslust towards Hamburg-Altona	ICE 18	Berlin-Spandau towards München Hbf
Ludwigslust towards Hamburg-Altona	ICE 28	Berlin-Spandau One-way operation
Ludwigslust towards Warnemünde	IC 57	Stendal Hbf towards Leipzig Hbf
Preceding station	Ostdeutsche Eisenbahn	Following station
Karstädt towards Wismar	RE 8	Bad Wilsnack towards Elsterwerda
Preceding station	DB Regio Nordost	Following station
Terminus	RE 6	Weisen towards Berlin-Charlottenburg
Preceding station	Mittelelbe S-Bahn	Following station
Geestgottberg towards Schönebeck-Bad Salzelmen	S 1	Terminus
Location
- Location within Brandenburg Location within Germany Location within Europe

Wittenberge station is the railway station for the Brandenburg town of Wittenberge in Germany. About 5,000 passengers use the station daily and it is served by around 100 trains per day.

== Infrastructure ==
The station is located about 1.3 kilometres from the city centre on the eastern edge of the town of Wittenberge. The entrance building and the main platform are accessible from the west over several directly abutting streets. Following an extensive rebuild in 2004, the station now has a 55-centimetre-high (22 in) and 375-metre-long (1,230 ft 4 in) home platform as well as two island platforms 405 metres (1,329 ft) in length and 76 centimetres (30 in) in height. Another part of the platform, which is approximately 60 metres (200 ft) long, lies to the south, but it is not directly connected to the through tracks.

Two island platforms, each with a length of 405 m (1,329 ft) and a height of 76 cm (30 in), extend towards the north from the centre of the entrance building. They are connected to the main platform by a 65 m-long (213 ft) underpass.

Barrier-free accessibility is provided by a wheelchair ramp next to the three sets of steps down to the road-side at the entrance building and to the island platforms are reached by lifts beside the access steps.

== History ==
The station was built in 1846 at kilometre post 126 on the Berlin–Hamburg railway. In 1851 the Wittenberge–Stendal line was opened. That made Wittenberge station into the most important railway hub between Berlin and Hamburg. The station building of this Keilbahnhof ("wedge station", i.e. situated between the two converging lines of a junction) was located between the western approach tracks of the Magdeburg route and the eastern approach tracks on the Berlin–Hamburg railway.

From 1870 trains also ran from here on a branch of the Berlin–Hamburg railway, that led over the river Elbe near Dömitz and via Dannenberg to Buchholz.

=== Upgrade ===
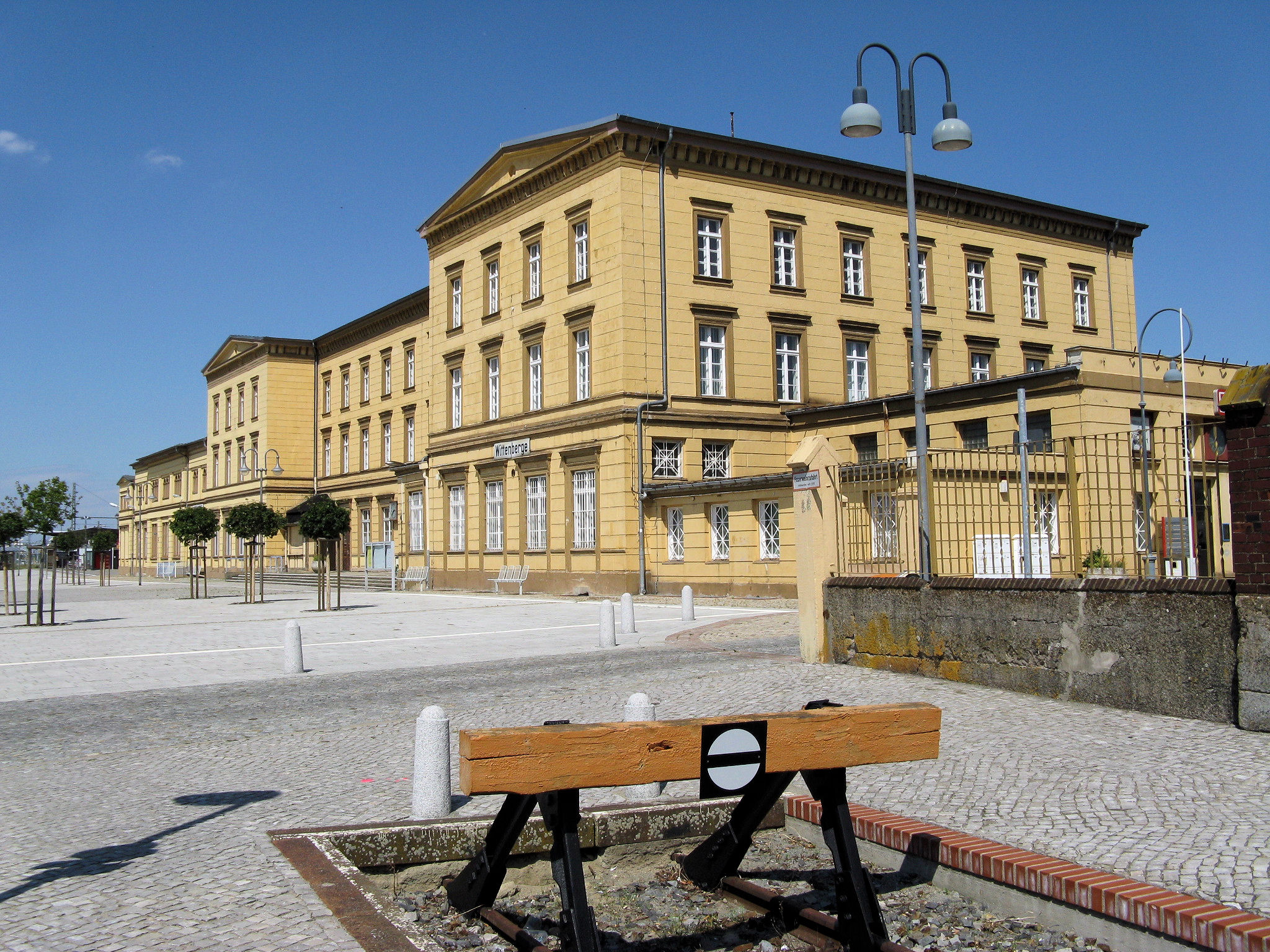
End of the tracks at a buffer stop on the western side of the station

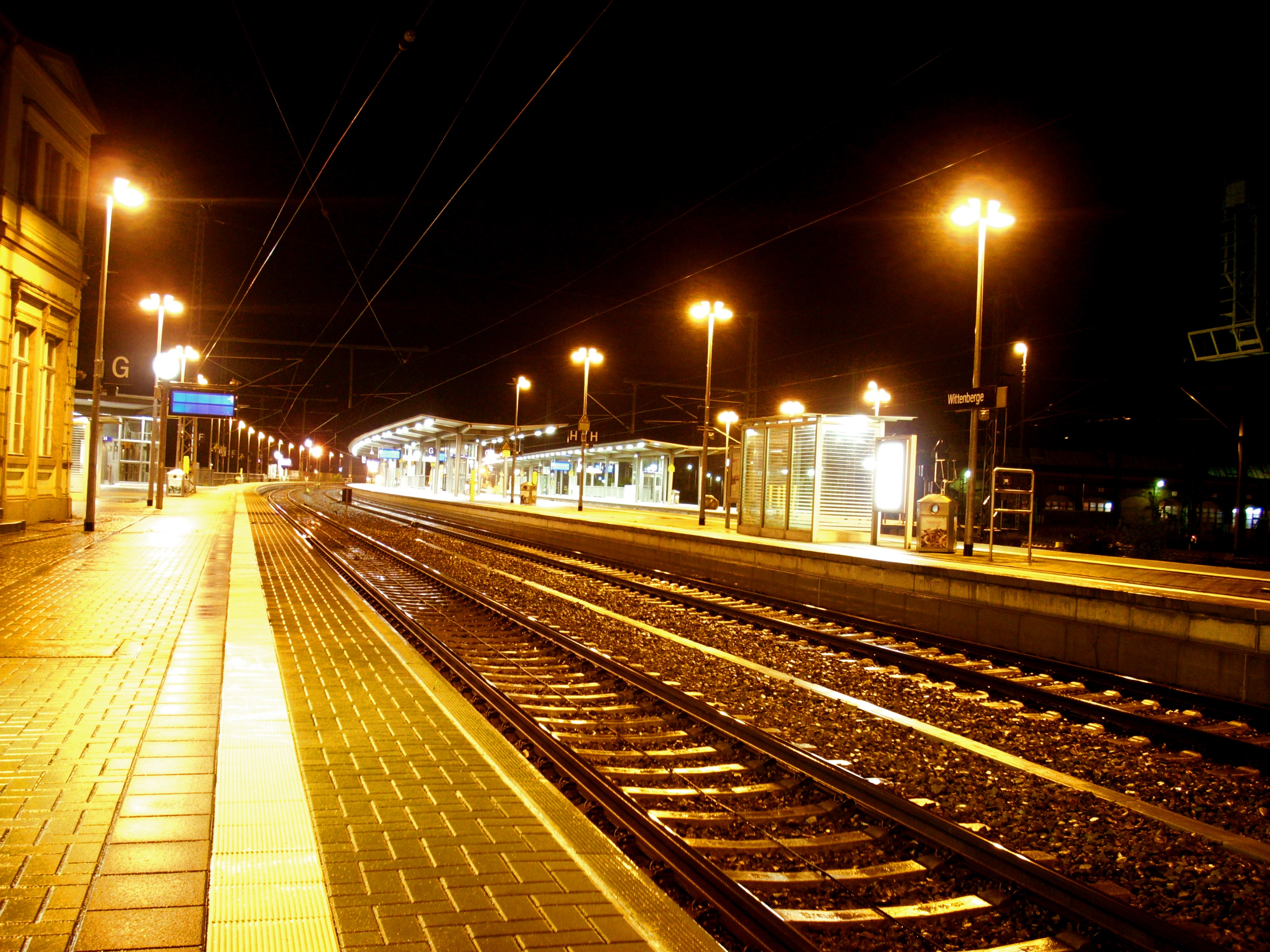
Berlin side after the rebuilding of the station

Wittenberge station was comprehensively refurbished as part of the upgrade of the Berlin–Hamburg railway in 2000. It lost its status as an island station, as all the tracks are now on the eastern side of the station building. The so-called Magdeburg Side lost its tracks, the line from Stendal being re-routed south of the building on the Berlin Side. The number of tracks was also significantly reduced.

The refurbishment required 280,000 tonnes of earth to be moved, around 22 kilometres track to be replaced, 120 points to be removed, 42 points to be installed and 32 kilometres of catenary to be replaced. The running speed through the station was raised from 30 to 160 km/h; an increase to 197 km/h, which was also considered, would have required the control of active tilting technology by the train safety system, LZB, but this was not put into practice. A total of seven million euros was invested.

The opening of the rebuilt station took place on 24 August 2004 in the presence of the German chancellor, Gerhard Schröder.

== Transport links ==
Long-distance services are provided by five InterCity/EuroCity pairs of trains between Berlin/Dresden or Hamburg on workdays and an IC train pair between Rostock and Leipzig. One or two ICE trains stop at the station during the daily rush hours, but most pass through without stopping.

In the 2026 timetable the following lines stop at the station:

=== Long distance trains ===
Line	Route	Frequency (min)
ICE 18	Hamburg-Altona – Hamburg – Wittenberge – Berlin → Halle → Erfurt → Nuremberg → Augsburg → Munich	Two train pairs
ICE 28	Hamburg-Altona ← Hamburg ← Wittenberge ← Berlin ← Leipzig ← Erfurt ← Halle ← Nuremberg ← Munich	Two trains
IC 57	Warnemünde – Rostock – Wittenberge – Magdeburg – Halle – Leipzig	Three trains

=== Regional trains ===
Line	Route	Frequency (min)	Operator
RE 6	Wittenberge – Perleberg – Pritzwalk – Wittstock – Neuruppin – Hennigsdorf – Berlin-Charlottenburg	60	DB Regio Nordost
RE 8	Wismar – Schwerin – Ludwigslust – Wittenberge – Berlin – Potsdamer Platz – Südkreuz – Baruth – Doberlug-Kirchhain – Elsterwerda	120; 60 (Wittenberge–Baruth)	Ostdeutsche Eisenbahn
S 1	Wittenberge – Osterburg – Stendal – Tangerhütte – Magdeburg – Schönebeck-Bad Salzelmen	60 (Mon–Fri); 120 (Sat–Sun)	DB Regio Südost
