= Weisen station =

Railway station in Weisen, Germany

Weisen
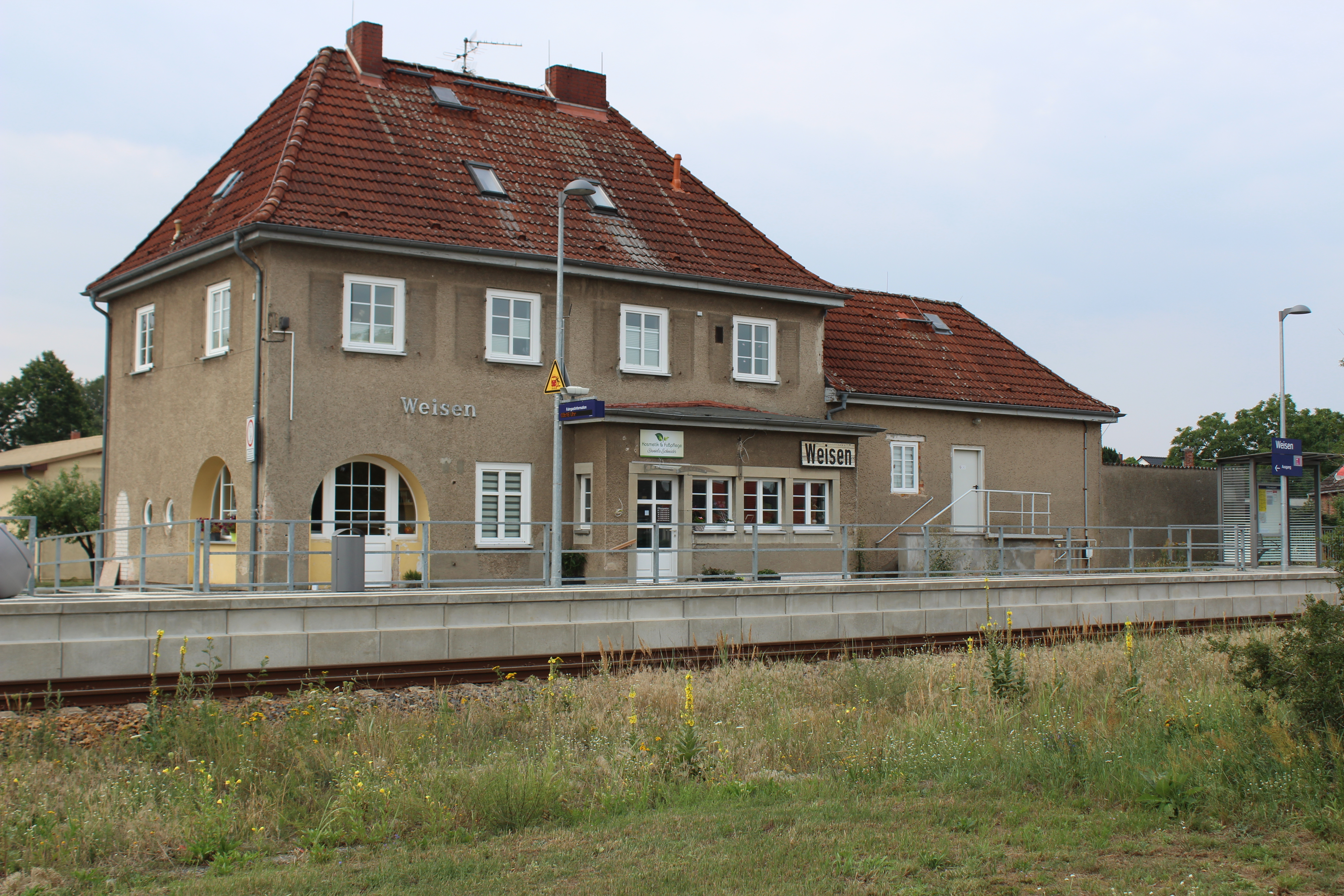
- 2019

General information
- Location: Am Bahnhof 4; 19322 Weisen; Brandenburg; Germany
- Coordinates: 53.0254°N 11.7877°E
- System: Hp
- Owner: Deutsche Bahn
- Operator: DB Station&Service
- Lines: Wittenberge–Strasburg railway (KBS 206)
- Platforms: 1 side platform
- Tracks: 1
- Train operators: DB Regio Nordost
- Connections: RE 6

Construction
- Parking: yes
- Cycle facilities: yes
- Accessible: yes

Other information
- Station code: 6625
- DS100 code: WWSN
- IBNR: 8013258
- Category: 6
- Fare zone: VBB: 4330
- Website: www.bahnhof.de

Services
Preceding station	DB Regio Nordost	Following station
Wittenberge Terminus	RE 6	Perleberg towards Berlin-Charlottenburg
Location
- Location within Brandenburg Location within Germany Location within Europe

Weisen station (German: Haltepunkt Weisen) is a railway station in the municipality of Weisen, located in the Prignitz district in Brandenburg, Germany.
