= Dorf Mecklenburg station =

Railway station in Germany

Dorf Mecklenburg
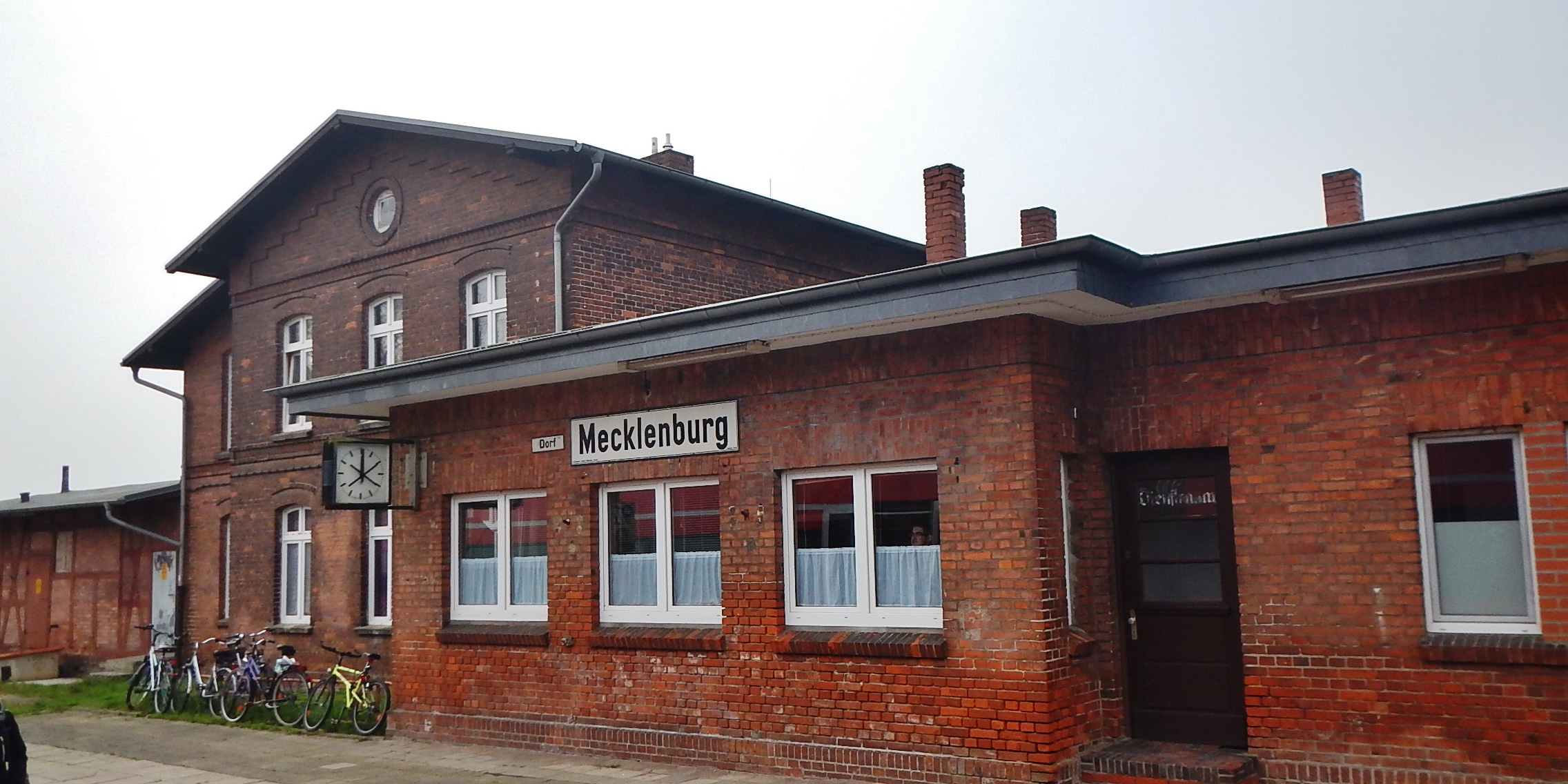
- 2014

General information
- Location: Bahnhofstraße 46A; 23972 Dorf Mecklenburg; Mecklenburg-Vorpommern; Germany
- Coordinates: 53°50′34″N 11°28′18″E
- Owner: Deutsche Bahn
- Operator: DB Station&Service
- Lines: Ludwigslust–Wismar railway (KBS 202)
- Platforms: 2 side platforms
- Tracks: 2
- Train operators: DB Regio Nordost; ODEG

Construction
- Parking: yes
- Cycle facilities: no
- Accessible: yes

Other information
- Station code: 4019
- DS100 code: WMK
- IBNR: 8012321
- Category: 6
- Website: www.bahnhof.de

History
- Electrified: 30 May 1987; 39 years ago

Services
| Preceding station | Ostdeutsche Eisenbahn | Following station |
|---|---|---|
| Wismar Terminus | RE 8 | Bad Kleinen towards Elsterwerda |
| Preceding station | DB Regio Nordost | Following station |
| Wismar Terminus | RB 17 | Moidentin towards Ludwigslust |
Location
- Location within Mecklenburg-Vorpommern Location within Germany Location within Europe

Dorf Mecklenburg station is a railway station in the municipality of Dorf Mecklenburg, located in the Nordwestmecklenburg district in Mecklenburg-Vorpommern, Germany.
