= Bad Doberan station =

Railway station in Bad Doberan, Germany

Bad Doberan
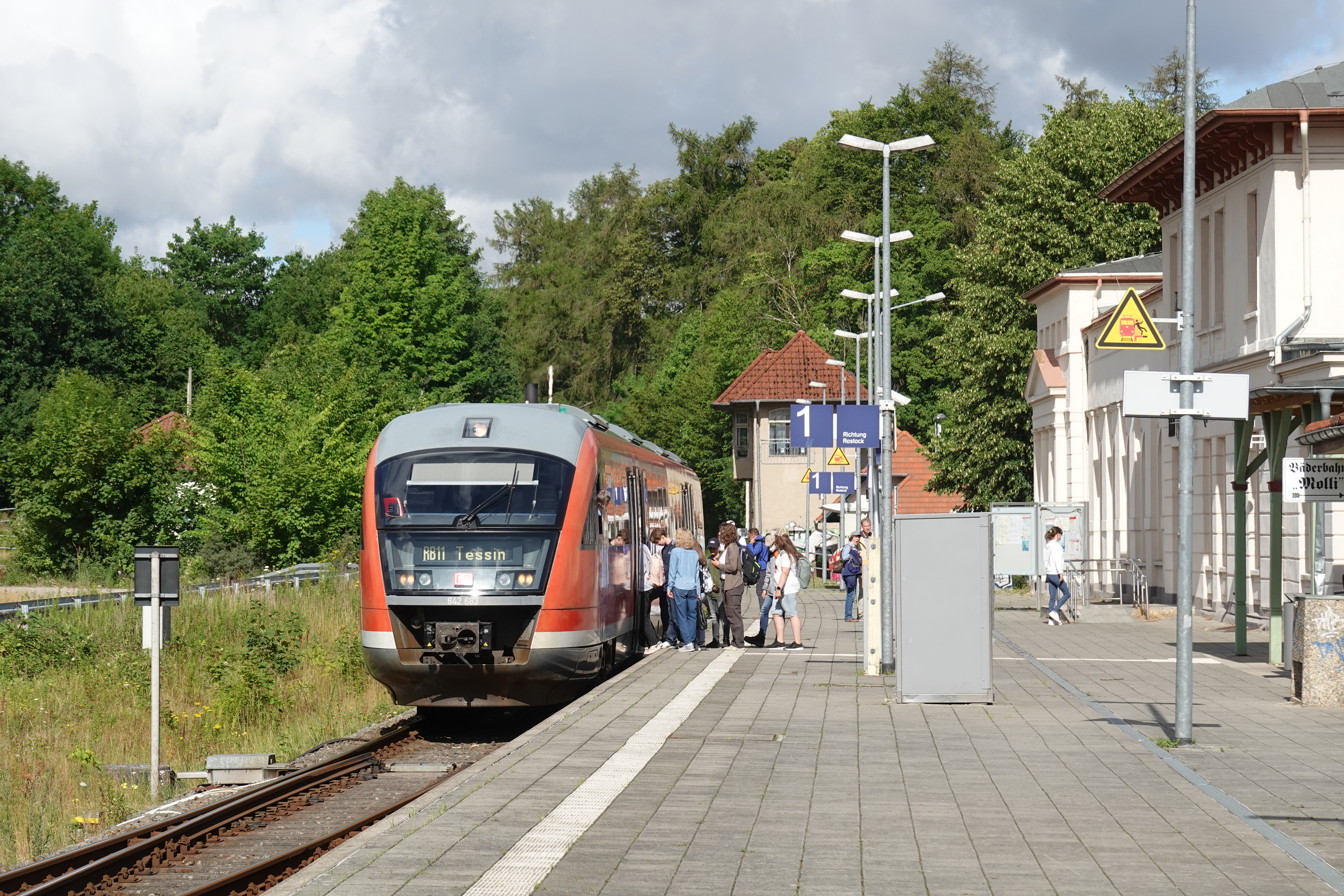
- 2023

General information
- Location: Am Bahnhof 2; 18209 Bad Doberan; Mecklenburg-Vorpommern; Germany
- Coordinates: 54°06′01″N 11°54′14″E
- Owner: DB Netz
- Operator: DB Station&Service
- Lines: Wismar–Rostock railway (KBS 185); Molli railway (KBS 186)
- Train operators: DB Regio Nordost; Mecklenburgische Bäderbahn Molli

Other information
- Station code: 262
- DS100 code: WDO
- IBNR: 8010016
- Category: 5
- Website: www.bahnhof.de

History
- Opened: 27 July 1883; 143 years ago

Services
Preceding station	DB Regio Nordost	Following station
Reddelich towards Wismar	RB 11	Althof towards Tessin
Terminus	RB 12	Althof towards Graal-Müritz
Preceding station	Molli	Following station
Bad Doberan Stadtmitte towards Ostseebad Kühlungsborn West	RB 31	Terminus
Location

Bad Doberan station is a railway station in the town of Bad Doberan, located in the district of Rostock, Mecklenburg-Vorpommern, Germany.

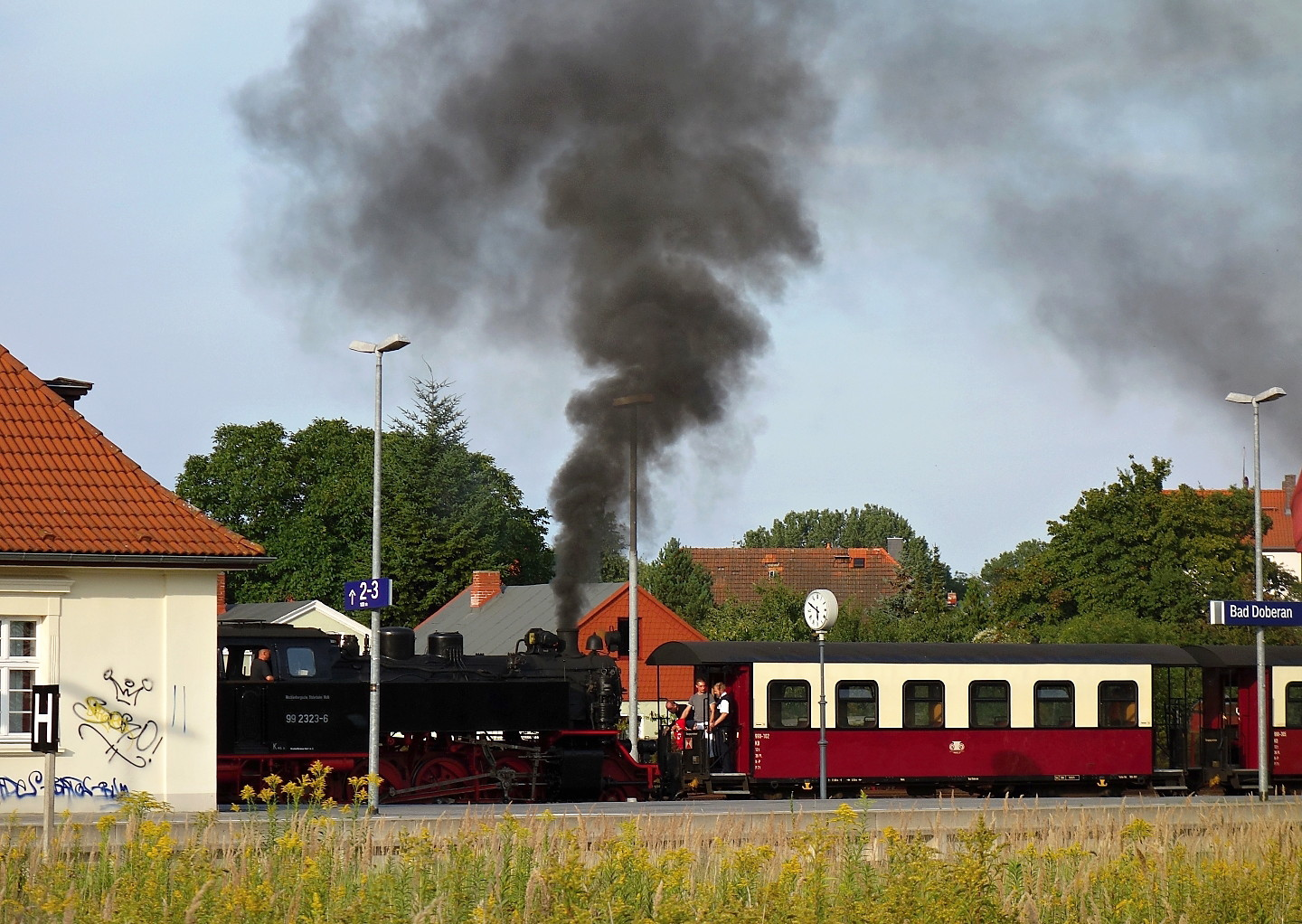
Molli at Bad Doberan station (2012).
