= Trams in Rostock =

Coordinates: 54°5′9″N 12°8′28″E

Rostock tramway network
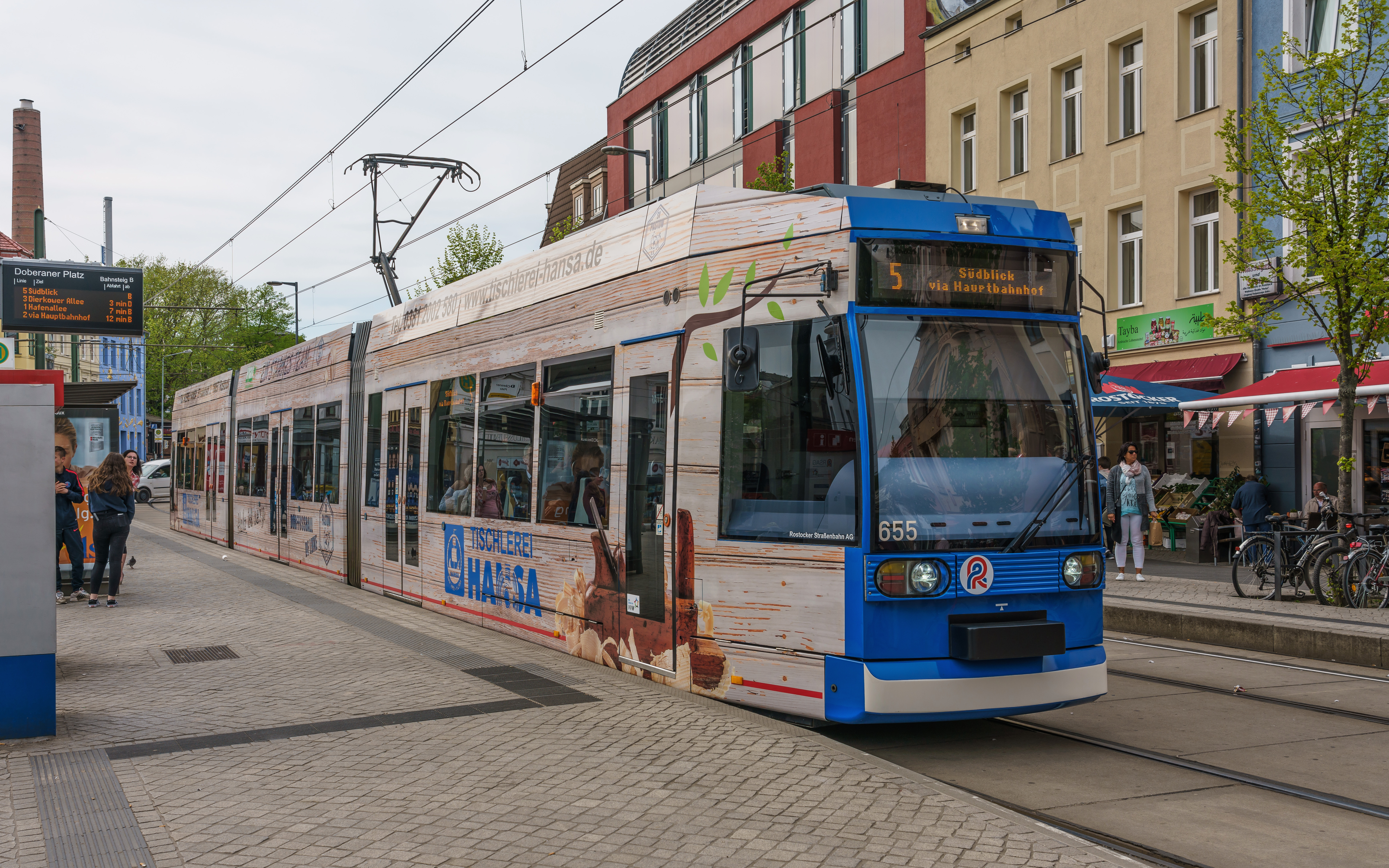
- DÜWAG / Siemens 6NGTWDE in Rostock, 2018

Operation
- Locale: Rostock, Mecklenburg-Vorpommern, Germany

Statistics
Horsecar era: 1881–1904
- Operator: Mecklenburgische Straßen-Eisenbahn Aktien-Gesellschaft (MSEAG)
- Track gauge: 1,435 mm (4 ft 8 1/2 in) standard gauge
- Propulsion system: Horses
Electric tram era: since 1904
- Lines: 6
- Operator: Rostocker Straßenbahn AG (RSAG)
- Track gauge: 1,435 mm (4 ft 8 1/2 in) standard gauge
- Propulsion system: Electricity
- Electrification: 750 V DC overhead line
- Track length (total): 35.6 km (22.1 mi)
- Route length: 65.1 km (40.5 mi)
- Map of the network.
- Website: https://www.rsag-online.com/ Rostocker Straßenbahn AG

The Rostock tramway network (German: Straßenbahnnetz Rostock) is a network of tramways forming the centrepiece of the public transport system in Rostock, the largest city in the federal state of Mecklenburg-Vorpommern, Germany.

Opened in 1881 as a horsecar system, the network was converted to electrical operation in 1904. It is currently operated by Rostocker Straßenbahn AG (RSAG), and integrated in the Verkehrsverbund Warnow (VVW).

== Lines ==
As of 2013, the network had six lines, as follows:

Since 2016
Line	Route	Notes
1	(Lichtenhagen, Mecklenburger Allee –) Lütten Klein, Rügener Straße – Evershagen – Marienehe – Reutershagen – Doberaner Platz – Steintor – Dierkower Kreuz – Hafenallee	extended to Lichtenhagen in the evenings and on weekends
2	Reutershagen – Doberaner Platz – Goetheplatz – Hauptbahnhof – Steintor – Dierkower Kreuz – Kurt-Schumacher-Ring	daily during the day
3	(Neuer Friedhof –) Platz der Jugend – Doberaner Platz – Goetheplatz – Hauptbahnhof – Steintor – Dierkower Kreuz – Dierkower Allee	during the evenings on workdays; all day on weekends
4	Campus Südstadt – Goetheplatz – Lange Straße – Hauptbahnhof – Steintor – Dierkower Kreuz – Dierkower Allee	during the day on workdays
5	Lichtenhagen, Mecklenburger Allee – Lütten Klein, Rügener Straße – Evershagen – Marienehe – Reutershagen – Doberaner Platz – Lange Straße – Steintor – Hauptbahnhof – Südblick	
6	Neuer Friedhof – Doberaner Platz – Lange Straße – Steintor – Hauptbahnhof – Campus Südstadt	daily during the day

== See also ==
- List of town tramway systems in Germany
- Trams in Germany
