= Dorf Mecklenburg =

- Municipality
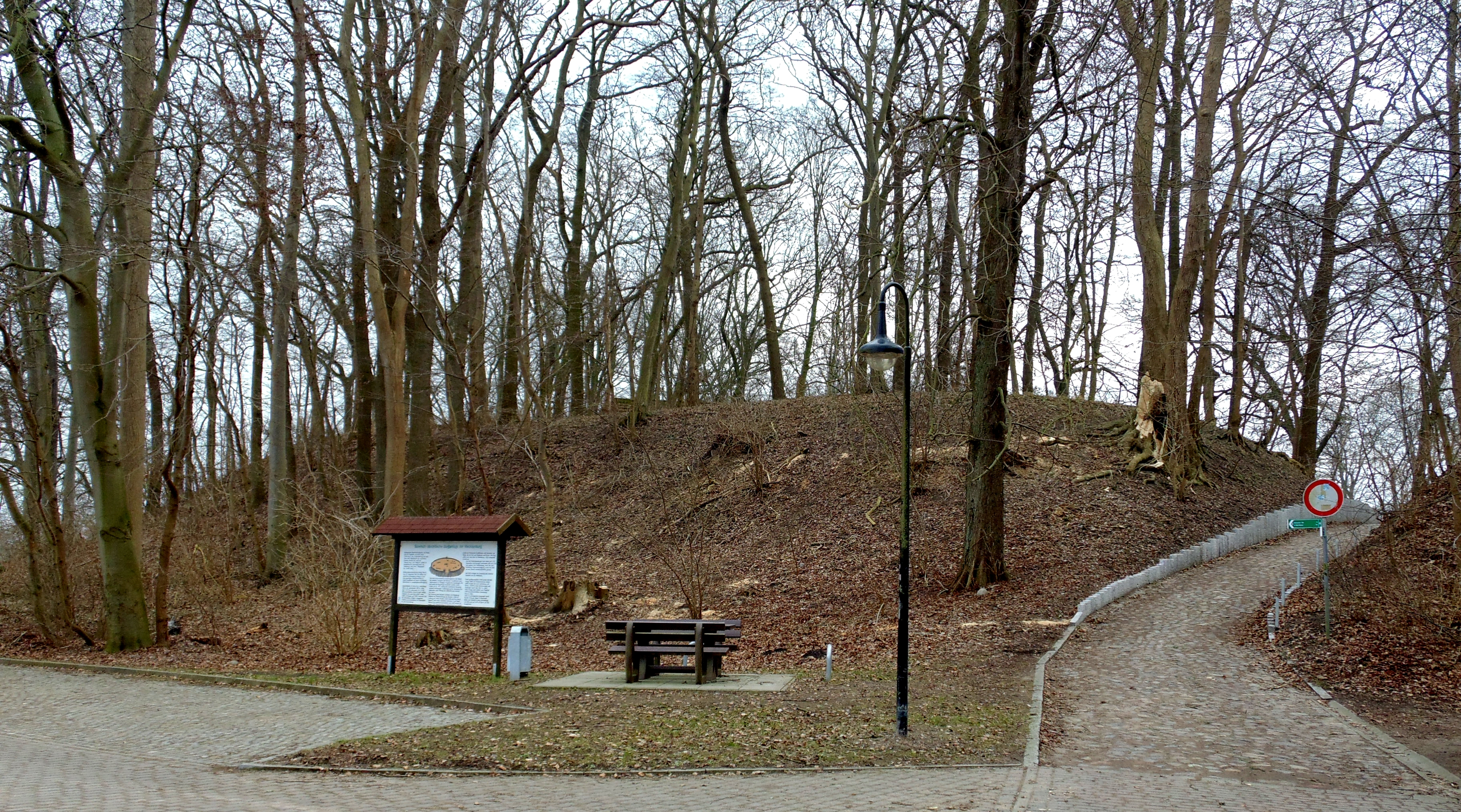
- Mound of Mecklenburg Castle in Dorf Mecklenburg

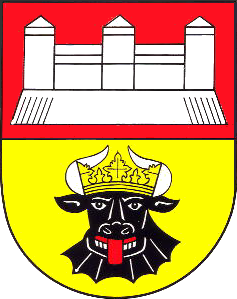
- Coat of arms

- Location of Dorf Mecklenburg within Nordwestmecklenburg district
- Interactive map of Dorf Mecklenburg
- Location within Germany Location within Mecklenburg-Vorpommern
- Coordinates: 53°51′N 11°28′E
- Country: Germany
- State: Mecklenburg-Vorpommern
- District: Nordwestmecklenburg
- Municipal assoc.: Dorf Mecklenburg-Bad Kleinen

Government
  - Mayor: Peter Sawiaczinski

Area
  - Total: 29.97 km^{2} (11.57 sq mi)
- Elevation: 40 m (130 ft)

Population (2025-12-31)
  - Total: 3,115
  - Density: 103.9/km^{2} (269.2/sq mi)
- Time zone: UTC+01:00 (CET)
  - Summer (DST): UTC+02:00 (CEST)
- Postal codes: 23972, 23966
- Dialling codes: 03841
- Vehicle registration: NWM
- Website: www.dorf-mecklenburg.de

Dorf Mecklenburg is a municipality in the Nordwestmecklenburg district, in Mecklenburg-Vorpommern, Germany. It is located 6 km south of Wismar. It is home to the castle "Mikilenburg" (Old German: "big castle"), that gave its name to the whole region known as Mecklenburg.

== Etymology ==
The "Dorf" prefix means "village" in German. The English cognate is thorp, and in the Low German local dialect it is "Dorp". The "Mecklenburg" part derives from Mecklenburg Castle and means "large castle" in Old Saxon, the ancient version of Low German (mikil = large; Burg = castle). The original name of the castle was most likely "Wiligrad", which also means "large castle" in the Slavic Polabian dialect which was previously spoken in the region. This led to another castle, located on the shores of Lake Schwerin and built between 1896-1898, being named Wiligrad Castle (de:Schloss Wiligrad).

== Geography ==
The village of Dorf Mecklenburg lies between the Hanseatic city of Wismar and Lake Schwerin, one of Germany's largest lakes. The North Sea-Baltic Sea watershed is only about ten kilometres away from the Baltic Sea (Wismar Bay) in the slightly hilly area. To the west, the Wallensteingraben, which connects Lake Schwerin to the Baltic Sea as the only outflow, runs past the village and was built between 1577 and 1582 under Duke Ulrich.

=== Districts ===
The following districts belong to the village of Dorf Mecklenburg:

- Karow
- Kletzin
- Moidentin
- Olgashof
- Petersdorf
- Rambow
- Rosenthal
- Rothentor
- Steffin

== Transport accessibility ==
Dorf Mecklenburg, only 6 km away from Wismar, is very well connected to national transport networks. The A 20 Baltic motorway (Lübeck - Stettin) and the northern section of the A 14 (Wismar - Schwerin) pass in the immediate vicinity. The village can be reached from Schwerin and Wismar via the B 106. The local railway station is on the Ludwigslust–Wismar railway line.
