= Tessin station =

Railway station in Tessin, Mecklenburg-Vorpommern, Germany

Tessin
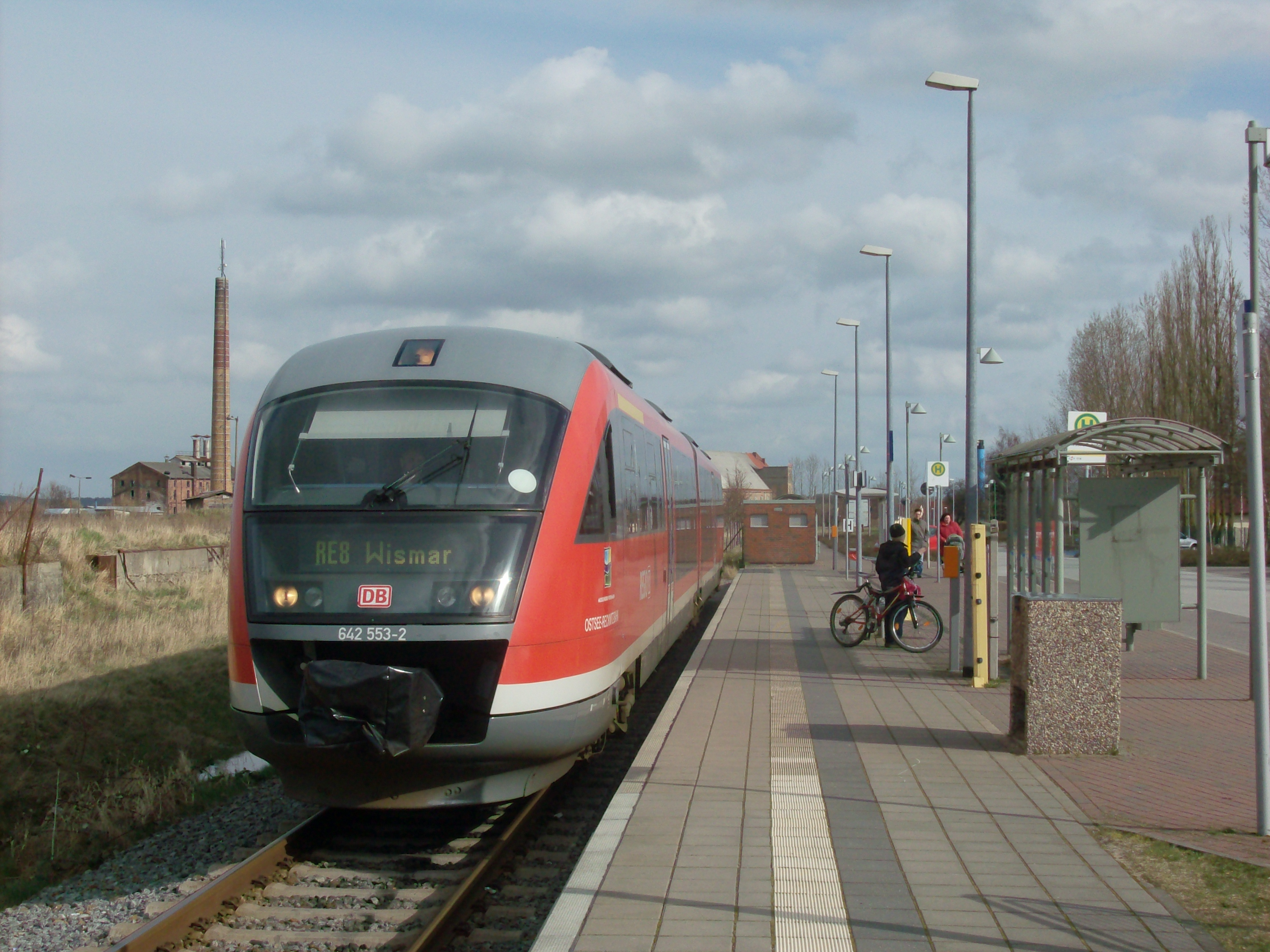

General information
- Location: Am Umsteigebahnhof 1; 18195 Tessin; Mecklenburg-Vorpommern; Germany
- Coordinates: 54°01′54.9″N 12°27′45.5″E
- Owner: DB Netz
- Operator: DB Station&Service
- Lines: Rostock–Tribsees/Tessin railway (KBS 185)
- Platforms: 1 side platform
- Tracks: 1
- Train operators: DB Regio Nordost

Other information
- Station code: 6174
- DS100 code: WTI
- IBNR: 8013106
- Category: 6
- Website: www.bahnhof.de

History
- Opened: 16 November 1895; 130 years ago

Services
Preceding station	DB Regio Nordost	Following station
Tessin West towards Wismar	RB 11	Terminus
Location
- Location within Mecklenburg-Vorpommern Location within Germany Location within Europe

Tessin station is a railway station in the town of Tessin, located in the district of Rostock, Mecklenburg-Vorpommern, Germany.

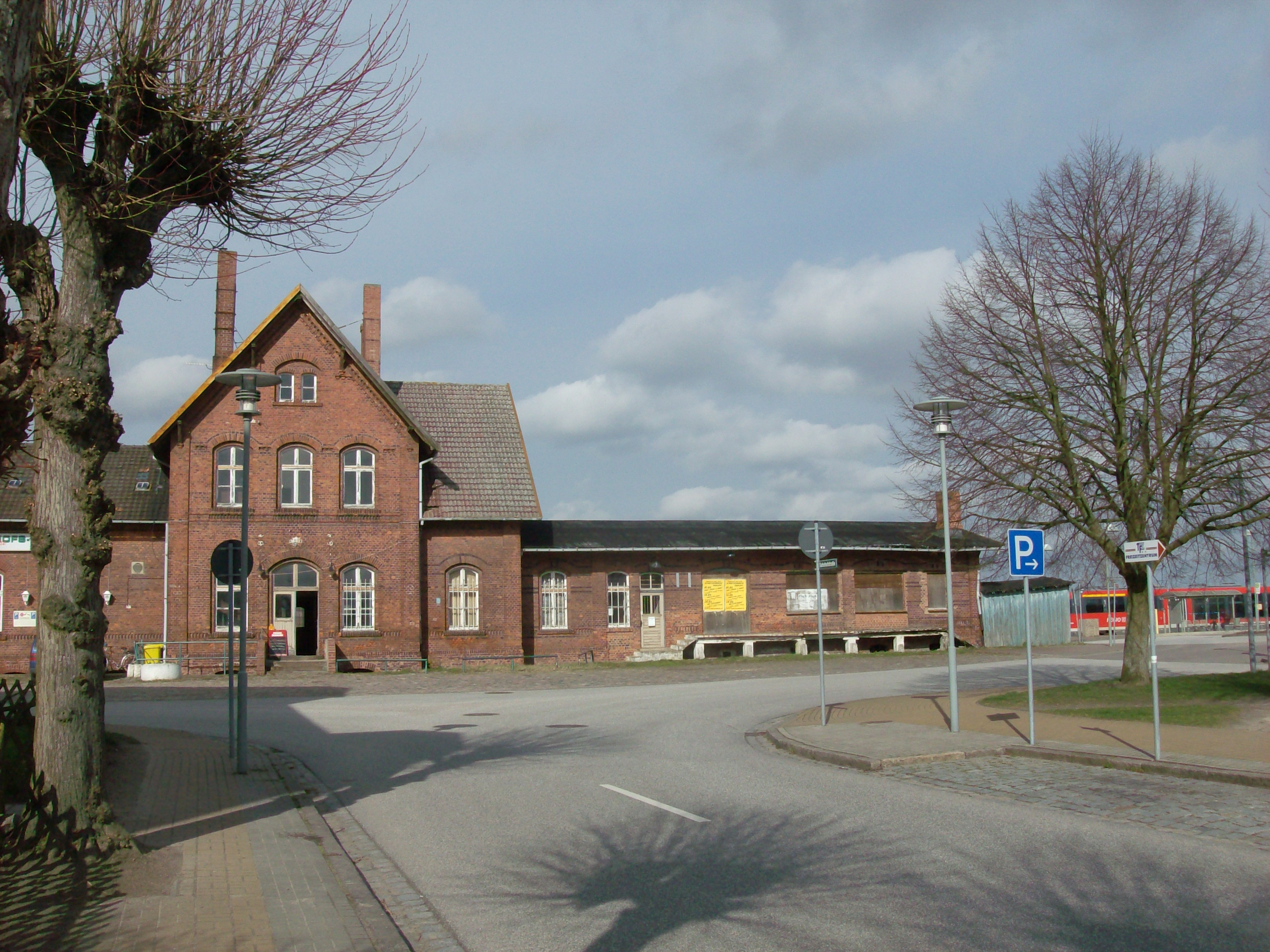
Station building (2008).
