= Wismar station =

Railway station in Wismar, Germany

Wismar
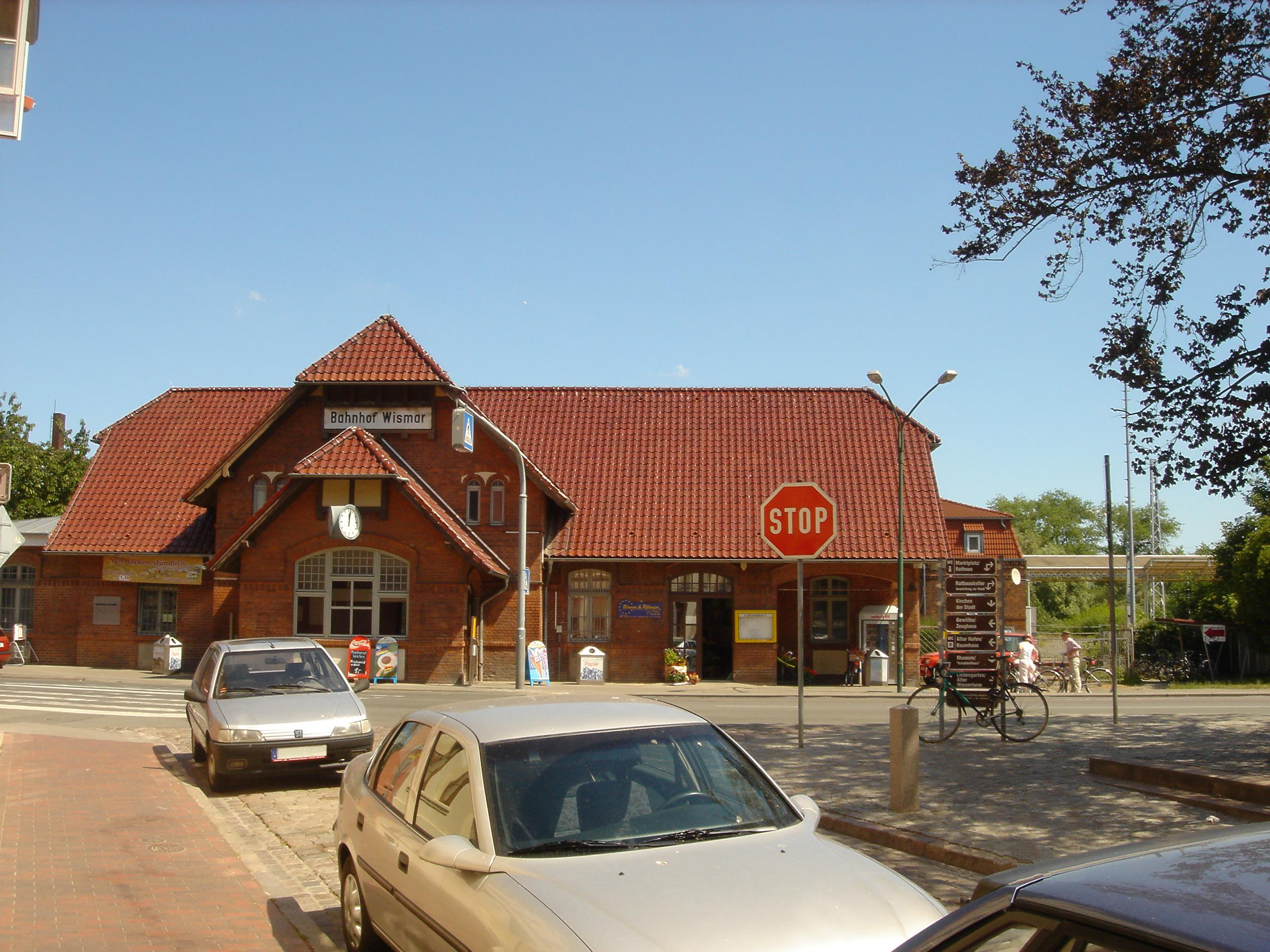

General information
- Location: Bahnhofstraße 12; 23966 Wismar, MV; Germany
- Coordinates: 53°53′48″N 11°28′09″E
- Owner: Deutsche Bahn
- Operator: DB Station&Service
- Lines: Ludwigslust–Wismar KBS 204); Wismar–Rostock (KBS 185)
- Platforms: 3

Construction
- Accessible: Yes

Other information
- Station code: 6818
- DS100 code: WWI
- IBNR: 8010381
- Category: 5
- Website: www.bahnhof.de

History
- Opened: 12 July 1848; 178 years ago
- Electrified: 30 May 1987; 39 years ago

Services
Preceding station	Ostdeutsche Eisenbahn	Following station
Terminus	RE 8	Dorf Mecklenburg towards Elsterwerda
Preceding station	DB Regio Nordost	Following station
Terminus	RB 11	Hornstorf towards Tessin
Terminus	RB 17	Dorf Mecklenburg towards Ludwigslust
Location

Wismar (German: Bahnhof Wismar) is a railway station in the town of Wismar, Mecklenburg-Vorpommern, Germany. The station lies on the Ludwigslust–Wismar railway and Wismar–Rostock railway and the train services are operated by Deutsche Bahn.

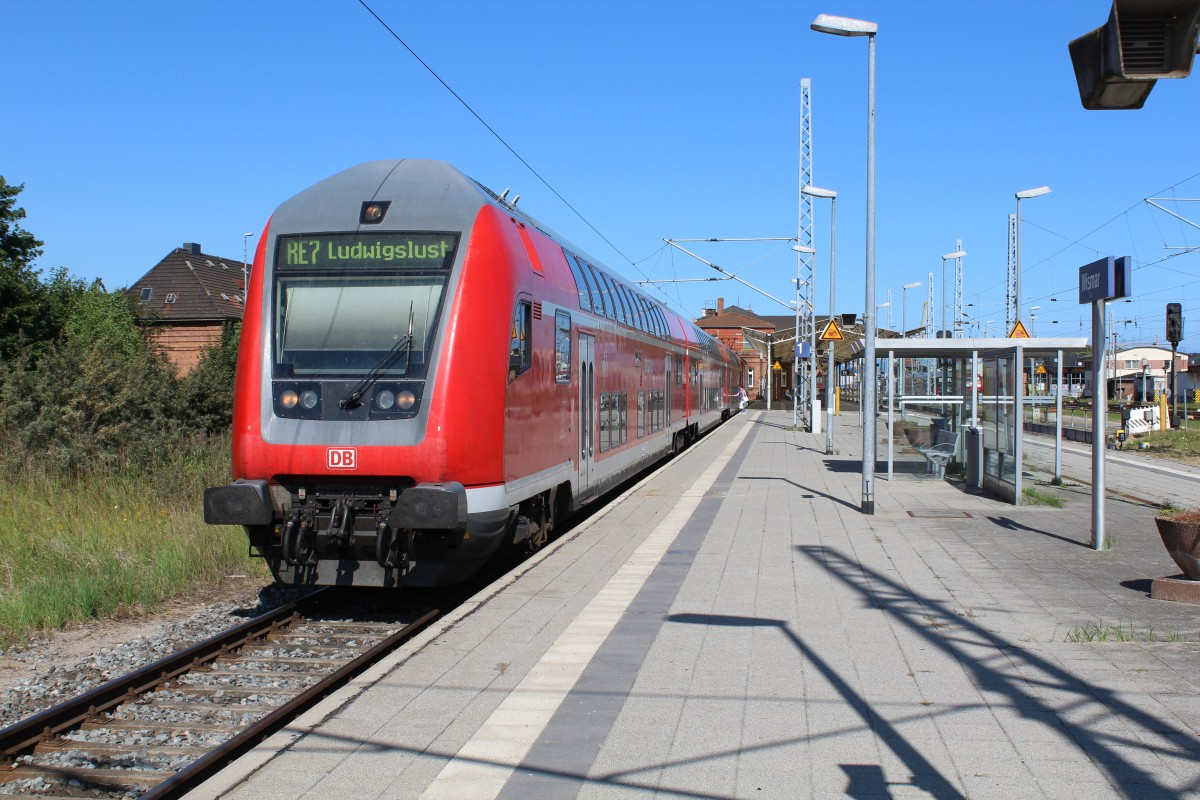
RE 7 ready to leave for Ludwiglust on track 1 (2013).

== History ==
After construction of the Schwerin–Wismar railway, a station was needed at the terminus. The chosen site offered convenient access to the port of Wismar. By the end of 1847, the first buildings were built, two sheds for materials and a kyanizing works. Later a roundhouse, a carriage shed, a tool shed and a coke store and a coke oven were added. It was estimated that the construction of the planned entrance building would cost about 28,500 Thalers.

When the railway line was inaugurated in 1848, the roundhouse had been completed, there was also a cattle ramp and a large turntable. By 1857 the carriage shed was used as an entrance building and goods shed. There was a station forecourt and a promenade that ran from Lindengarten to the harbour. There was a railway hotel next to the station. The station's system of tracks and the station building were extended between 1884 and 1894. Parking spaces for coaches, private carriages and buses were to be built outside the station according to a plan of 1896. An underpass for pedestrians was constructed around the turn of the century. In 2019, following renovations, the platforms and parking area became fully accessible. Passengers can now reach the platforms via an arcade. Previously, Deutsche Bahn had filled in the old pedestrian tunnel.

Rolling stock were produced at the nearby Waggonfabrik Wismar factory in Wismar from 1894 to 1947.

== Train services ==
The station was served by the following services in 2026:

Line	Route	Interval
RE 8	Wismar – Schwerin – Ludwigslust – Wittenberge – Berlin – Potsdamer Platz – Südkreuz – Wünsdorf-Waldstadt – Elsterwerda	Every 2 hours
RB 11	Wismar – Bad Doberan – Rostock Hbf – Tessin	Hourly
RB 17	Wismar – Schwerin Hbf – Ludwigslust	Every 2 hours
