= Altenwillershagen station =

Railway station in Altenwillershagen, Germany

Altenwillershagen

General information
- Location: Bahnhofstr. 2; 18320 Altenwillershagen; Mecklenburg-Vorpommern; Germany
- Coordinates: 54°15′33″N 12°34′26″E
- System: Hp
- Owner: DB Netz
- Operator: DB Station&Service
- Lines: Rostock-Stralsund railway (KBS 190)
- Platforms: 2 side platforms
- Tracks: 2
- Train operators: Ostdeutsche Eisenbahn

Other information
- Website: www.bahnhof.de

Services
Preceding station	Ostdeutsche Eisenbahn	Following station
Ribnitz-Damgarten Ost towards Rostock Hbf	RE 9	Buchenhorst towards Sassnitz
Location
- Location within Mecklenburg-Vorpommern Location within Germany Location within Europe

Altenwillershagen (German: Bahnhof Altenwillershagen) is a railway station in the town of Altenwillershagen, Mecklenburg-Vorpommern, Germany. The station lies on the Rostock-Stralsund railway and the train services are operated by Ostdeutsche Eisenbahn.

== Train services ==
The station is served by the following services:

Line	Route	Frequency	Operator
RE 9	Lietzow (Rügen) – Bergen auf Rügen – Samtens – Stralsund – Altenwillershagen– Velgast – Ribnitz-Damgarten West – Rostock	Every 2 hours	Ostdeutsche Eisenbahn
