= Martensdorf station =

Railway station in Martensdorf, Germany

Martensdorf
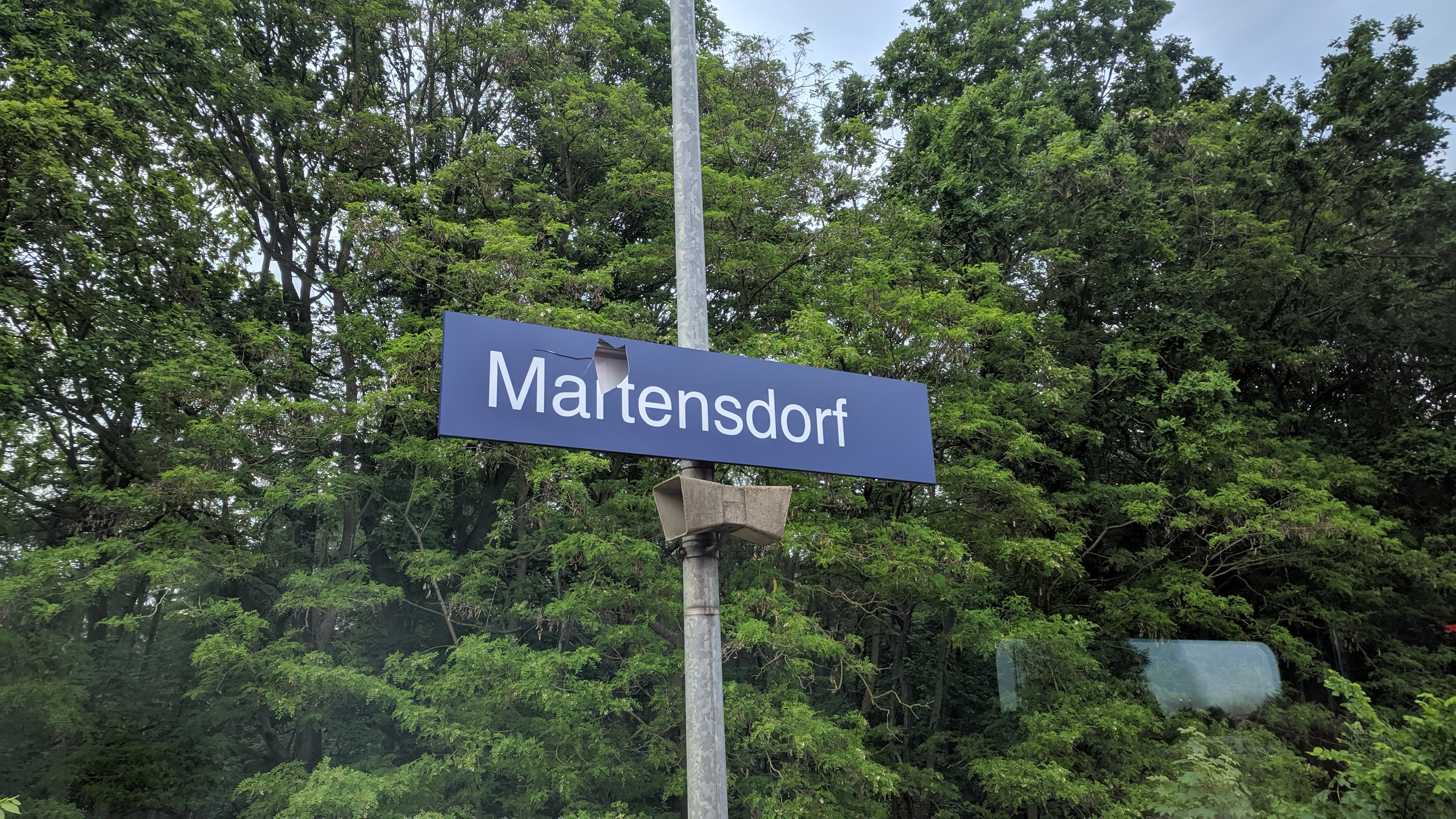
- Martensdorf station

General information
- Location: Martensdorf, MV, Germany
- Coordinates: 54°18′03″N 12°55′51″E
- Line: Rostock-Stralsund railway
- Platforms: 2
- Tracks: 2
- Train operators: ODEG
- Connections: RE 9

History
- Opened: 28 January 1885

Services
Preceding station	Ostdeutsche Eisenbahn	Following station
Velgast towards Rostock Hbf	RE 9	Stralsund-Grünhufe towards Sassnitz
Location
- Location within Mecklenburg-Vorpommern

Martensdorf (German: Bahnhof Martensdorf) is a railway station in the village of Martensdorf, Mecklenburg-Vorpommern, Germany. The station lies on the Rostock-Stralsund railway and the train services are operated by Ostdeutsche Eisenbahn GmbH.

== Train services ==
The station is served by the following services:

Line	Route	Frequency
RE 9	Rostock – Ribnitz-Damgarten – Velgast – Stralsund-Grünhufe – Stralsund – Bergen auf Rügen – Lietzow – Sassnitz	Every 2 hours
