= Stralsund-Grünhufe station =

Railway station in Grünhufe, Germany

Stralsund Grünhufe
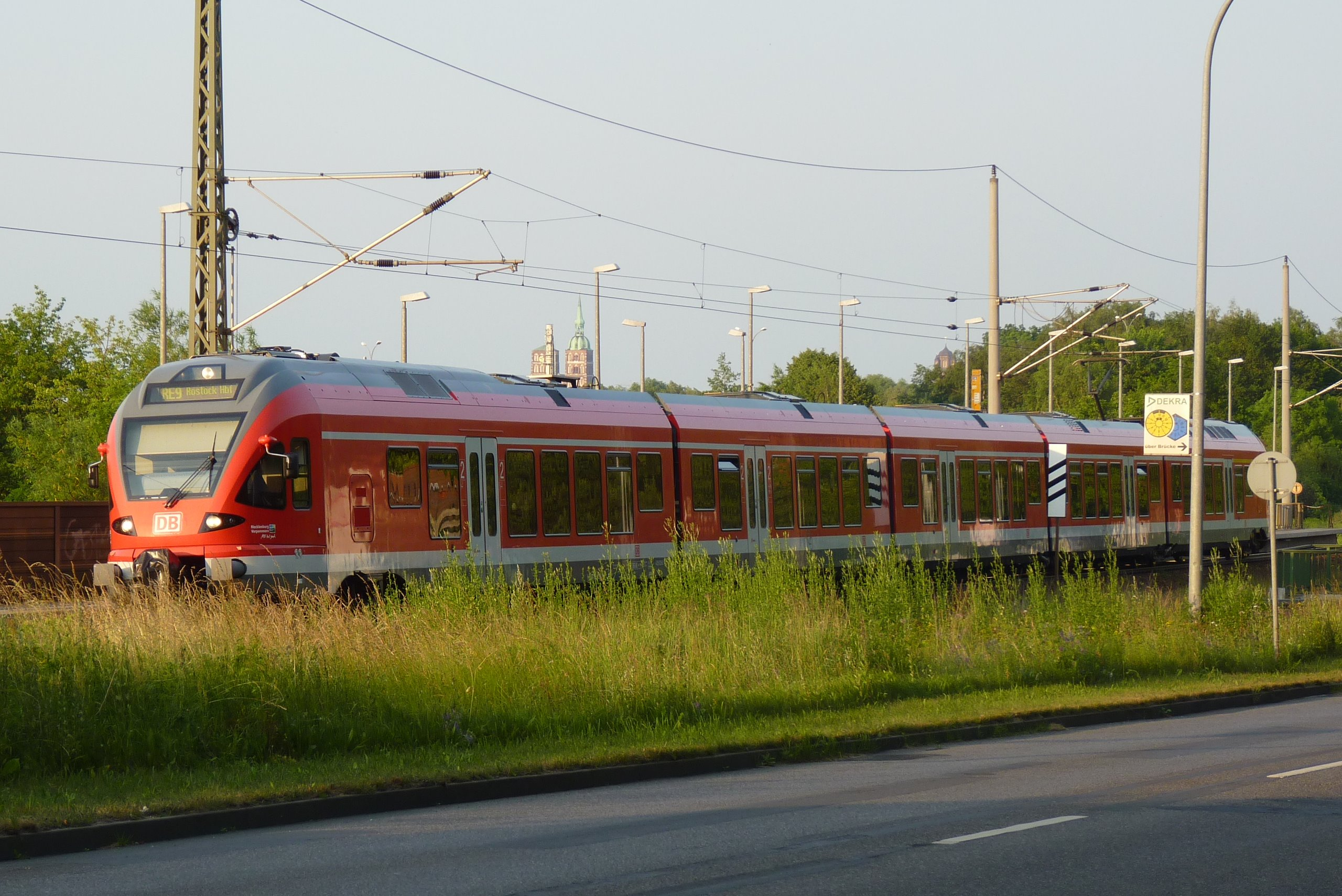
- Stralsund-Grünhufe station

General information
- Location: Grünhufe, MV, Germany
- Coordinates: 54°18′15″N 13°02′41″E
- Line: Rostock-Stralsund railway
- Platforms: 1
- Tracks: 1
- Train operators: ODEG

History
- Electrified: 2 June 1901; 125 years ago

Services
Preceding station	Ostdeutsche Eisenbahn	Following station
Martensdorf towards Rostock Hbf	RE 9	Stralsund Hbf towards Sassnitz
Velgast towards Rostock Hbf	RE 10	Stralsund Hbf towards Pasewalk
Location

Stralsund-Grünhufe (German: Bahnhof Stralsund-Grünhufe) is a railway station in the town of Grünhufe, Mecklenburg-Vorpommern, Germany. The station lies on the Rostock-Stralsund railway and the train services are operated by Ostdeutsche Eisenbahn GmbH.

== Train services ==
The station is served by the following services:

Line	Route	Frequency
RE 9	Rostock – Ribnitz-Damgarten – Velgast – Stralsund-Grünhufe – Stralsund – Bergen auf Rügen – Lietzow – Sassnitz	Every 2 hours
RE 10	Rostock – Ribnitz-Damgarten West – Velgast – Stralsund-Grünhufe – Stralsund – Greifswald – Züssow – Pasewalk	Two train pairs (Mo-Fr)
