= Velgast station =

Railway station in Velgast, Germany

Velgast
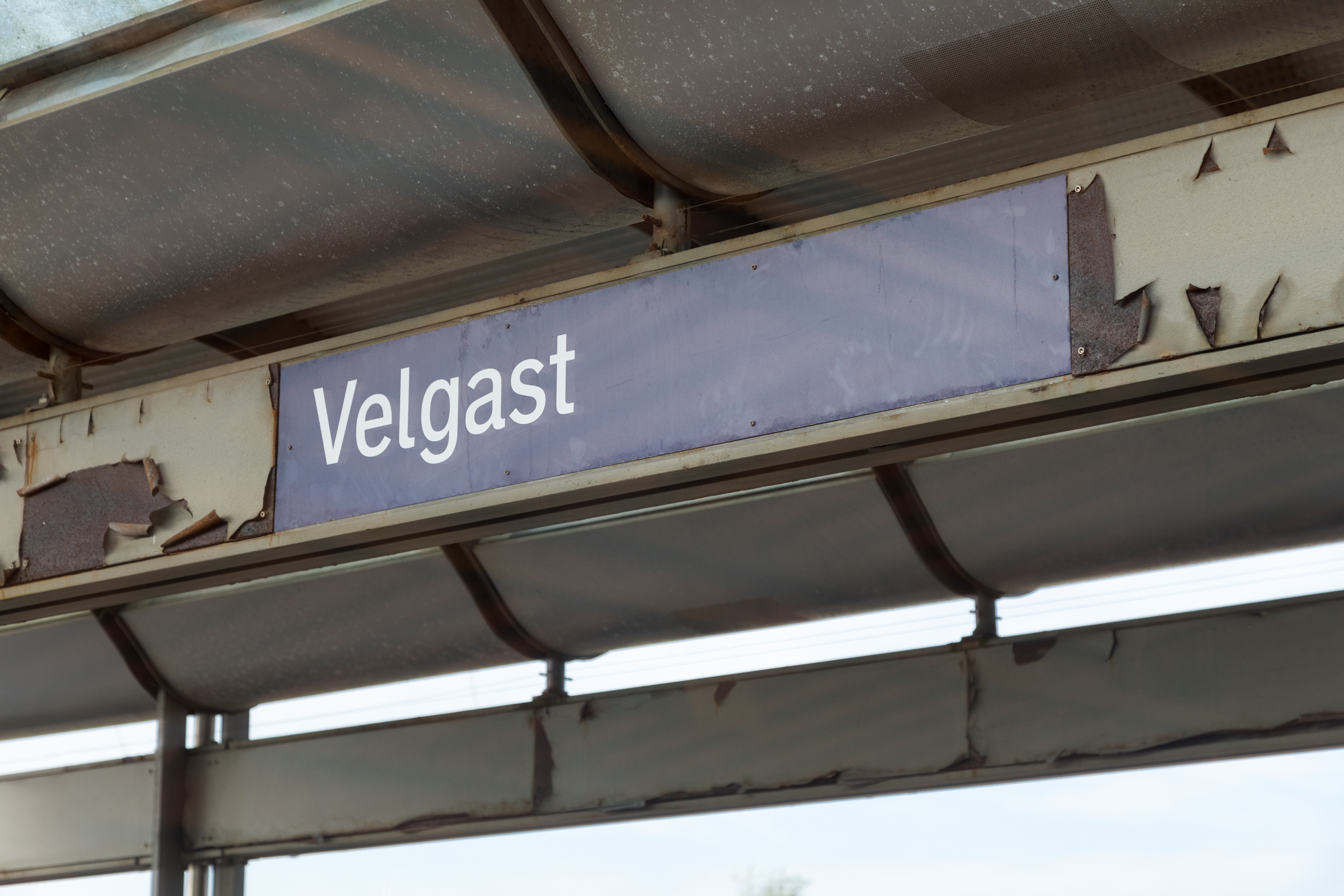
- 2017

General information
- Location: Bahnhofstraße 3; 18469 Velgast, MV; Germany
- Coordinates: 54°16′38″N 12°48′08″E
- Owner: DB Netz
- Operator: DB Station&Service
- Lines: Rostock–Stralsund (KBS 190); Velgast–Barth (KBS 192); Velgast–Tribsees/Franzburg (KBS 168)
- Platforms: 1 island platform 1 side platform
- Tracks: 4
- Train operators: DB Regio Nordost; Usedomer Bäderbahn

Construction
- Accessible: No

Other information
- Station code: 6405
- DS100 code: WV
- IBNR: 8010355
- Category: 5
- Website: www.bahnhof.de

History
- Opened: 1 July 1889; 137 years ago
- Electrified: 2 June 1991; 35 years ago

Services
Preceding station	DB Fernverkehr	Following station
Ribnitz-Damgarten West towards Hamburg-Altona	ICE 33	Stralsund Hbf towards Ostseebad Binz or Greifswald
Preceding station	DB Regio Nordost	Following station
Terminus	RB 25	Saatel towards Barth
Preceding station	Ostdeutsche Eisenbahn	Following station
Buchenhorst towards Rostock Hbf	RE 9	Martensdorf towards Sassnitz or Ostseebad Binz
Ribnitz-Damgarten Ost towards Rostock Hbf	RE 10	Martensdorf towards Pasewalk
Location

Velgast (German: Bahnhof Velgast) is a railway station in the town of Velgast, Mecklenburg-Vorpommern, Germany. The station lies on the Rostock-Stralsund railway and Velgast–Prerow railway line and the train services are operated by Deutsche Bahn and Ostdeutsche Eisenbahn.

== Train services ==
In the 2026 timetable the following lines stop at the station:

=== Long distance ===
Line	Route	Frequency
ICE 33	(Binz/Greifswald –) Stralsund – Velgast – Rostock – Schwerin – Hamburg – Hamburg-Altona	5 train pairs

=== Regional services ===
Line	Route		Frequency	Operator
RE 9	(Ostseebad Binz – Prora)	Lietzow (Rügen) – Bergen auf Rügen – Samtens – Stralsund – Velgast – Ribnitz-Damgarten West – Rostock	Every 2 hours	Ostdeutsche Eisenbahn
RE 9	Sassnitz – Sagard –	Lietzow (Rügen) – Bergen auf Rügen – Samtens – Stralsund – Velgast – Ribnitz-Damgarten West – Rostock	Every 2 hours	Ostdeutsche Eisenbahn
RE 10	Rostock – Ribnitz-Damgarten West – Velgast – Stralsund – Greifswald – Züssow		2 train pairs	Ostdeutsche Eisenbahn
RB 25	Velgast – Barth		80/40 mins (alternating)	DB Regio Nordost
