= Velgast–Prerow railway line =

Railway line in Germany

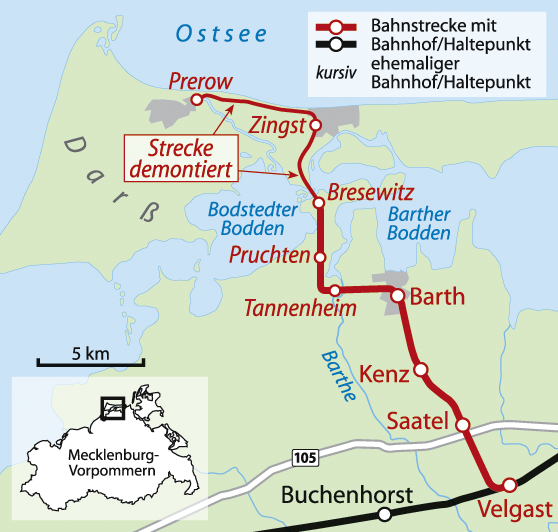

Technical
- Line length: 29.7 km (18.5 mi)
- Track gauge: 1435

The Velgast–Prerow railway line is a single-track, non-electrified branch line in Mecklenburg-Western Pomerania operated by the Usedomer Bäderbahn. It runs from Velgast via Barth and Zingst to Prerow, with the section from Barth to Prerow on the Darß peninsula also known as the Darßbahn.

The section from Velgast to Barth remains in operation, while tracks still exist between Barth and Bresewitz, though railway operations have been suspended since the 2000s. Between Bresewitz and Prerow, only the route remains, partly used as a railway cycle path north of the Meiningen Bridge.

== History ==
=== Velgast–Barth route and planning of the Darß Railway ===
When planning the main line between Stralsund and Rostock, a route through Barth between Stralsund and the Mecklenburg-Pomeranian border at Damgarten was considered. However, planners opted for a direct route, connecting Barth with a branch line from Velgast, opened by the Prussian State Railways on 1 July 1888 alongside the main line.

Around 1900, plans emerged to build a ferry port in Barth for a connection to Sweden. A canal was proposed at Zingst, with lock gates to protect against storms. The Barth–Velgast line was to be upgraded to a main line, with a new railway from Velgast to Grimmen connecting to the Neubrandenburg–Stralsund line. These plans never progressed beyond the initial stage.

Shortly afterwards, proposals were made to extend the line from Barth to Darß. A proposal by the municipality of Prerow failed due to existing shipping routes. On 20 July 1901, District Administrator von Zanthier visited the Darß peninsula. The Hanseatic city of Stralsund proposed a route, prompting renewed requests from Zingst and Prerow.

On 17 December 1904, a conference on the Darß Railway in Stettin decided on a 1000 mm gauge and the route Barth–Pruchten–Timmort–Zingst–Prerow. However, no final decision to build was made.

=== Construction of the Darß Railway ===
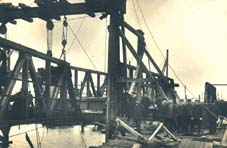
Construction of the Meiningen Bridge in 1908

Construction began simultaneously at multiple locations in spring 1909. An extension to Ahrenshoop was considered but not realised due to insufficient funding. The line was approved in November 1910.

The Meiningen Bridge, a 470-metre-long truss bridge built by an ironworks in Hannover-Herrenhausen, is the line's greatest engineering feat. Construction began in 1908 and continued until 1912, outlasting the line's opening.

=== Opening and operation in the early years ===
On 30 November 1910, the Barth–Prerow section opened. Test runs were conducted, with guests and local representatives welcomed at stations. The Darß Railway opened to public transport on 1 December 1910.

Operated by the Prussian State Railways, the line saw significant passenger growth, particularly among spa guests. Separate baggage trains were sometimes used. A storm surge on 30 December 1913 damaged the Meiningen Bridge and collapsed the Kloer Bridge between Pruchten and Bresewitz.

A temporary wooden bridge was erected in January 1914, replaced by a new 723-metre-long Kloer Bridge in March 1916, with 54 superstructures (five truss and 49 sheet metal girder structures).

Passenger numbers in the early 1920s remained below 1913 levels. Plans to extend the line to Graal-Müritz via the Mecklenburg Seaside Resort Railway were rejected by the Reichsbahn Directorate in Stettin on 5 November 1925, following criticism from conservationists and Ribnitz. Economic crises reduced passenger numbers, which recovered in the early 1930s with increased holidaymakers.

=== In the period from 1933 to April 1945 ===
After the National Socialist seizure of power, railway tracks were laid in Barth to the local air base (later a Barth concentration camp satellite). A connection to the Pommersche Industriewerke, an armaments company (1939–1945), was built in Tannenheim. These developments and KdF holiday programmes increased traffic. The maximum speed rose to 50 km/h, and in summer 1934, five train pairs operated, taking about an hour. Passenger numbers declined sharply after the Second World War began.

In April 1944, a derailment at Prerow station killed seven passengers when a switch was changed during entry. Operations from Zingst to Prerow were suspended.

=== After the Second World War ===
In the war's final days, Zingst residents prevented the Meiningen Bridge's destruction. Soviet soldiers entered Barth and Zingst. The Prerow–Bresewitz section was dismantled as reparations, though tracks on the Meiningen Bridge remained temporarily. Operations between Barth and Bresewitz briefly resumed, but rails were dismantled by 1947.

In the 1950s, locals demanded rebuilding. The National People's Army (NVA) planned to reconstruct the Barth–Bresewitz line for its Zingst training area. In 1967, the NVA railway pioneers began rebuilding, using the line for troop and material transport until reunification. A loading ramp was built in Bresewitz.

The Velgast–Barth section continued passenger and freight services. Tourism growth in Darß and Zingst increased passenger transport in the 1970s and 1980s, with over ten daily train pairs and summer express trains from Berlin. Passengers transferred to buses for seaside resorts, with through tickets available.

=== Decline and new prospects after 1990 ===
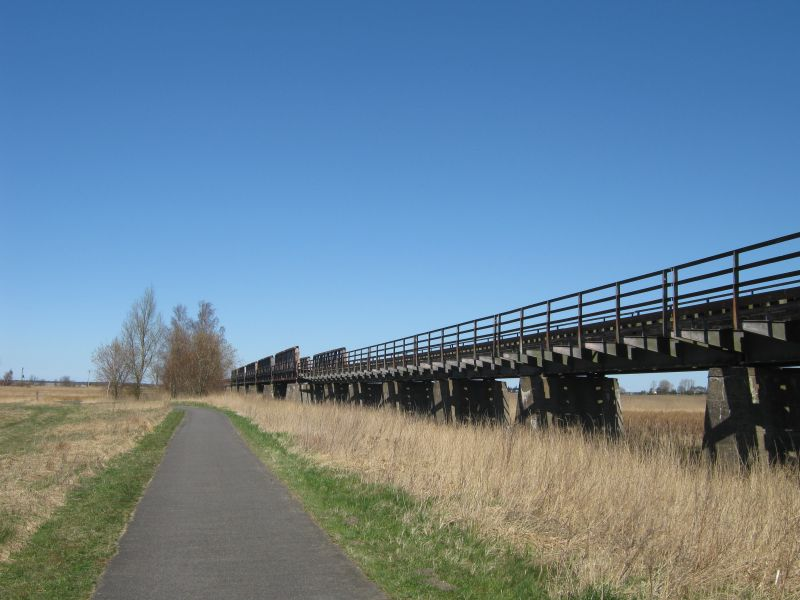
Kloer Bridge over the Gill Meadow

The NVA’s dissolution in 1990 ended operations on the Barth–Bresewitz section. The last journeys occurred in 1996–1997 for an exhibition. The line remains unofficially closed, with Deutsche Bahn rejecting special trip requests. A buffer stop was installed in Barth, and tracks at level crossings were covered.

Station buildings were renovated and sold privately in the 2000s. The railway embankment between Meiningen Bridge and Zingst became a railway cycle path.

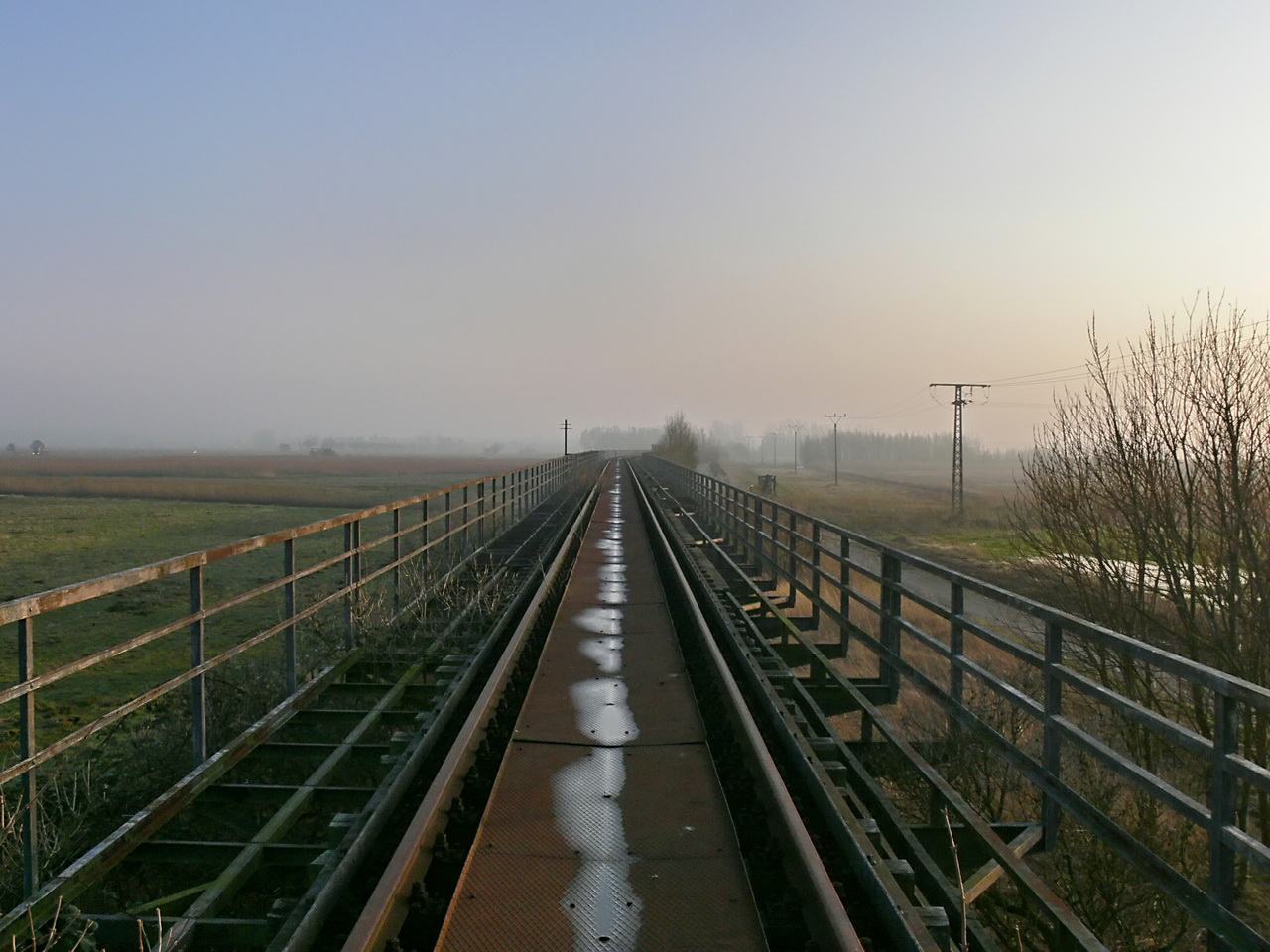
Bridge at Bodstedter Bodden

The Velgast–Barth section was electrified in 1991 with a single catenary, alongside the Rostock–Stralsund line, to support holiday trains. Operations began on 2 June 1991. Direct Interregio connections ran to Frankfurt am Main and Berlin in 1997, reduced to Chemnitz in 1998. Regional transport decreased from 1999, with nine daily train pairs at two-hour intervals.

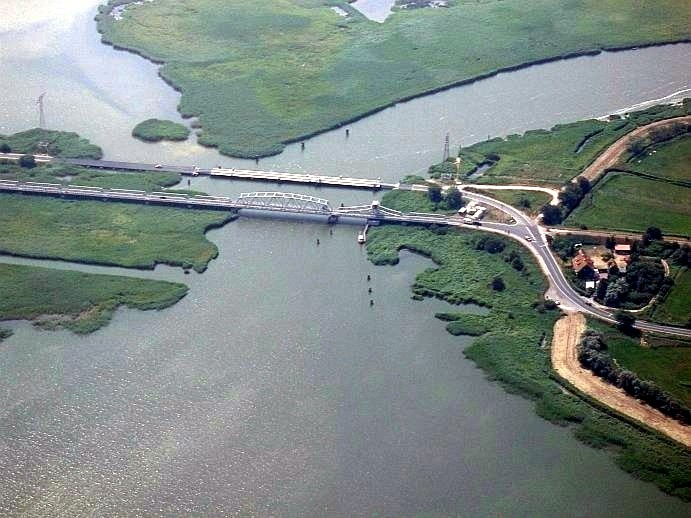
Meiningen Bridge

Since 1997, Velgast station's operations have been remotely controlled by an electronic signal box (ESTW). Initial oversight of the Barth branch caused operational issues, but protests prevented closure.

On 15 December 2002, the Usedomer Bäderbahn (UBB) took over passenger transport and infrastructure from DB Netz. Diesel railcars rendered the 1991 catenary obsolete, which was dismantled in 2005. Barth station's points, sidings, and signals were removed, downgrading it to a halt, eliminating freight and special train capabilities. Level crossings are now automated.

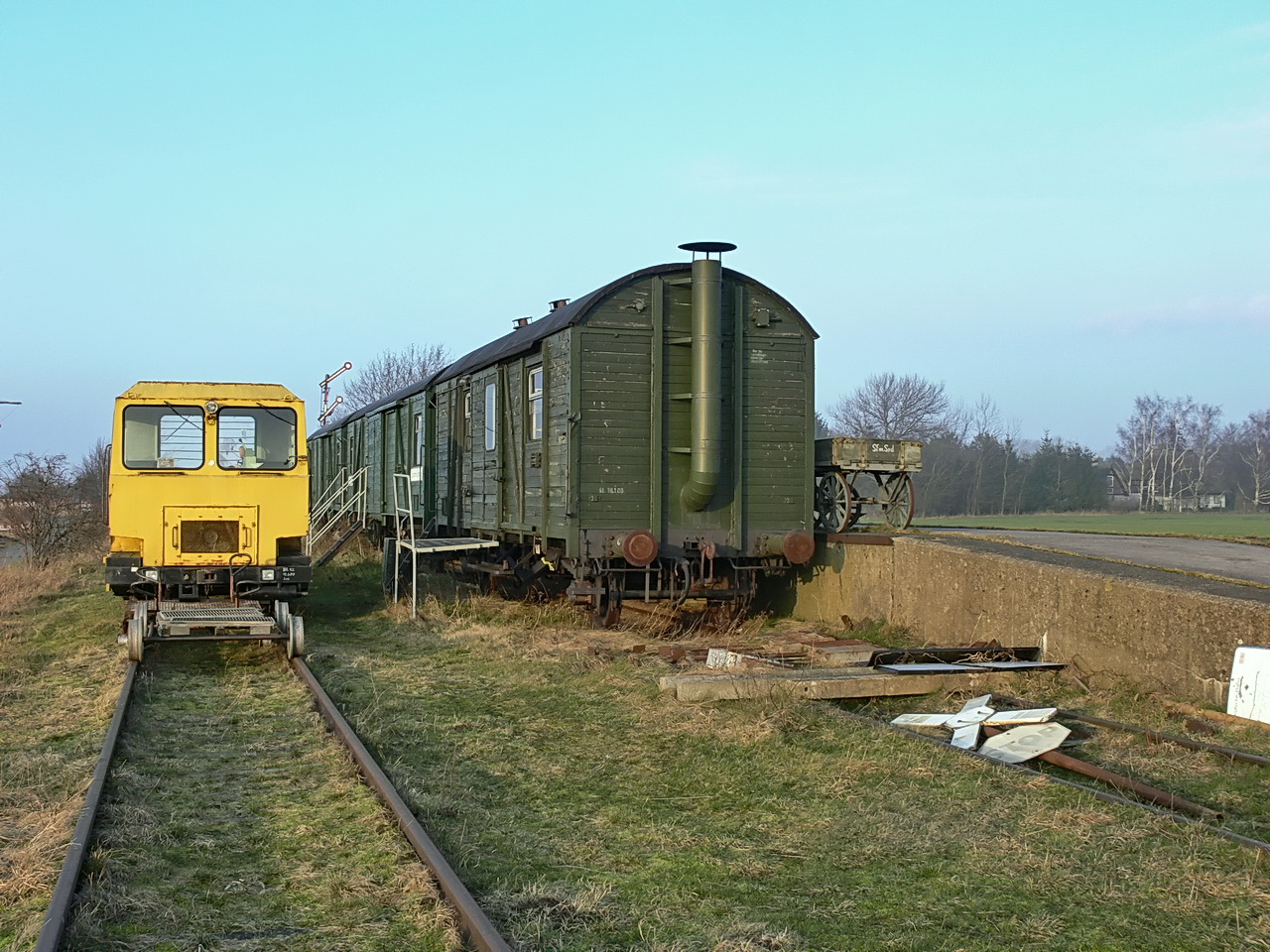
Railway tracks near Bresewitz

Since 10 December 2017, trains have operated at 40/80-minute intervals between Velgast and Barth for better connections to Rostock and Stralsund. Since December 2019, DB Regio Nordost has used a 50-seat railcar, with an option to extend services to Bresewitz every two hours from December 2022.

== Outlook and reconstruction ==
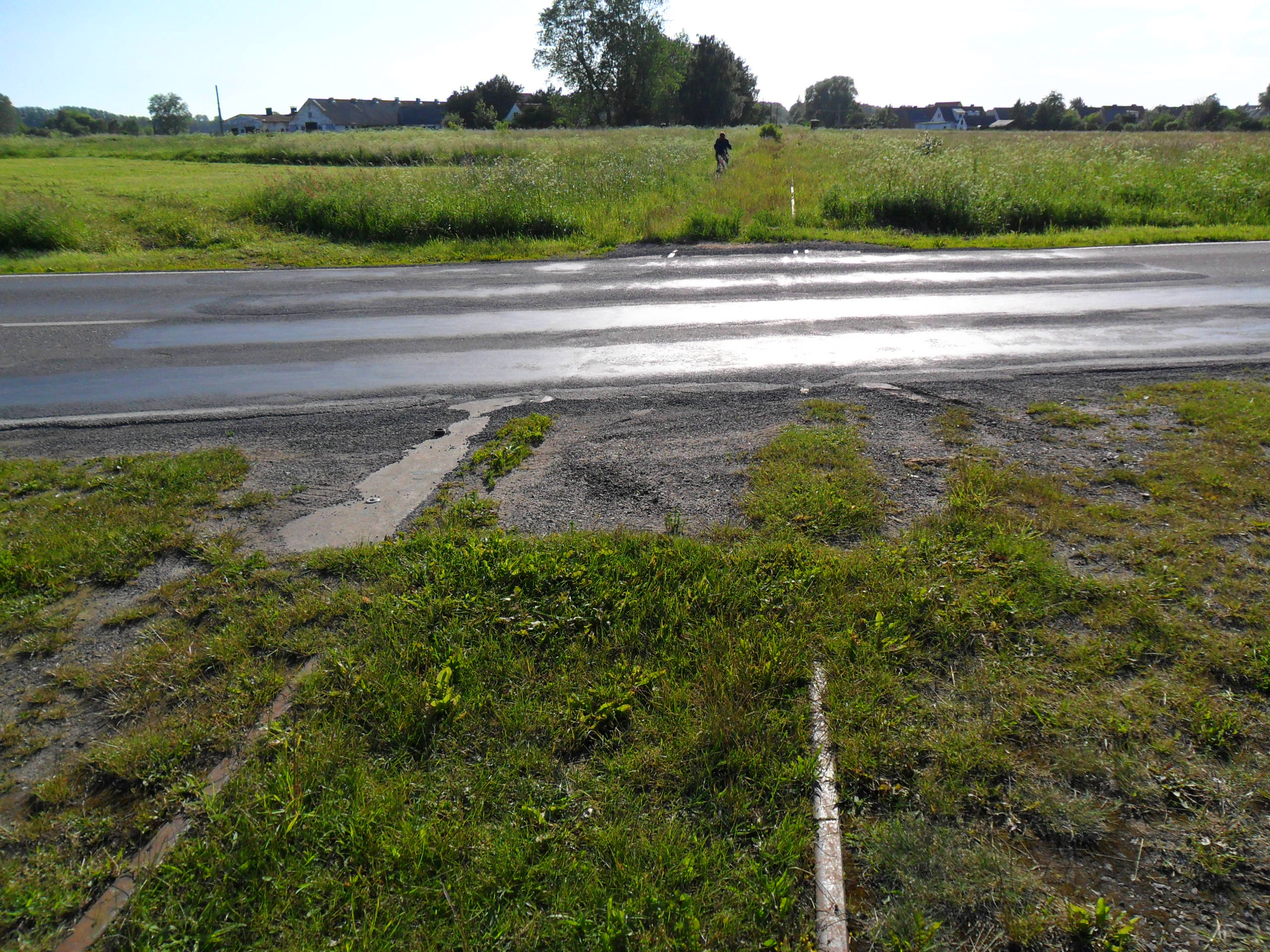
Overpassed level crossing on the Barth–Tannenheim section (June 2010)

After UBB acquired the infrastructure, plans to reopen the Barth–Prerow line emerged, targeting reactivation by 2015. In 2007, UBB planned to restore the Tannenheim section by 2009, with a planning approval process for Zingst underway.

A 2009 economic feasibility study estimated reconstruction costs at €48 million, with a cost-benefit ratio of 0.88, deeming it ineligible for funding.

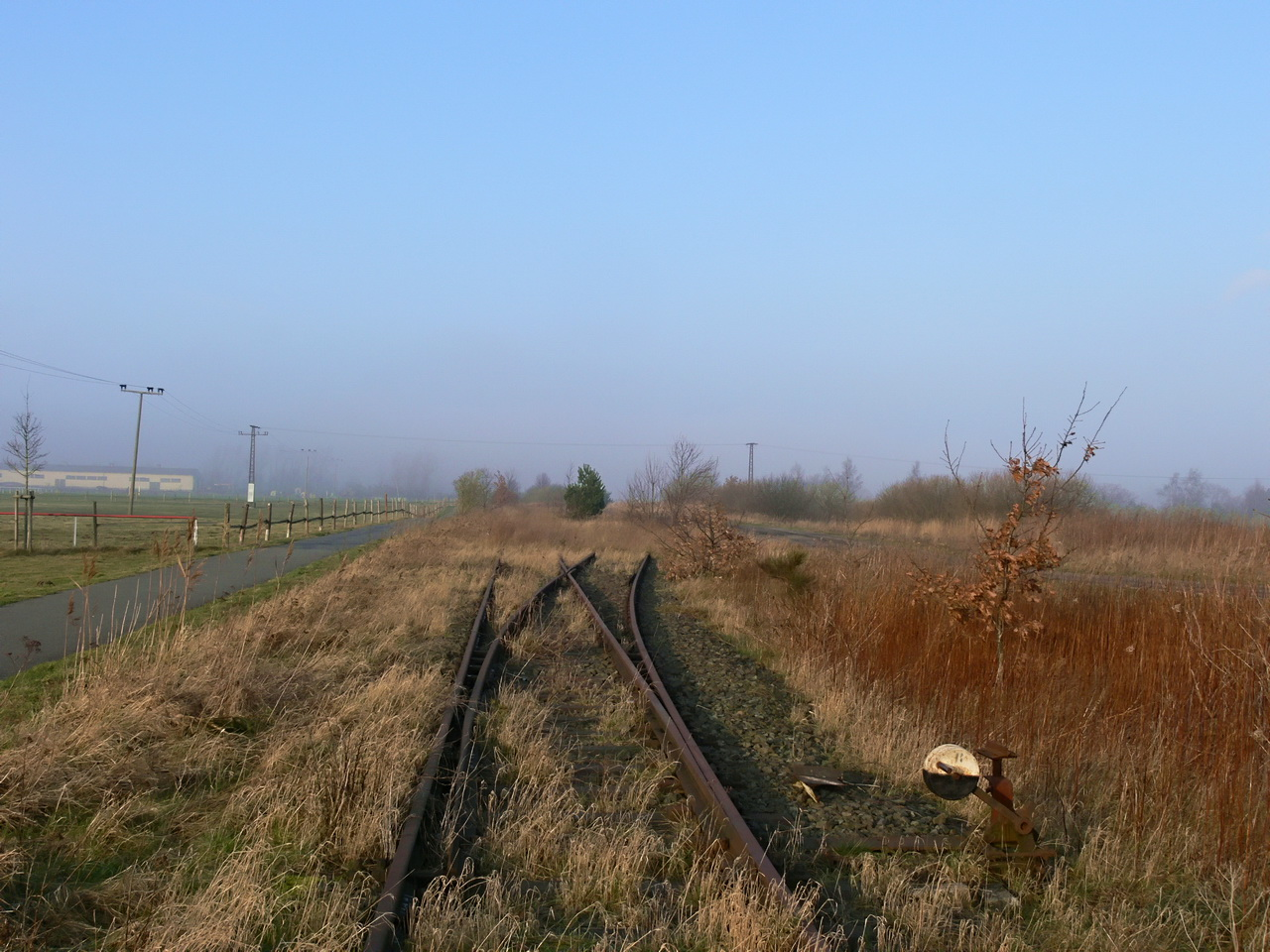
The route in 2007

On 24 April 2016, the Federal Railway Authority approved planning for the Barth–Bresewitz section. On 12 July 2016, the Vorpommern-Rügen district reported that State Transport Minister Christian Pegel appealed the decision, citing costs and Meiningen Bridge ownership disputes. Pruchten municipality also appealed. In October 2016, the CDU and SPD agreed to seek federal infrastructure funding. A plan change for Bresewitz–Zingst was discussed in October 2017.

On 4 February 2020, Minister-President Manuela Schwesig (SPD) and Federal Transport Minister Andreas Scheuer (CSU) resolved financing, with €50 million for a new bascule bridge replacing the Meiningen Bridge, funded equally by the federal government (€25.5 million), the state, and UBB (€89.5 million total). On 18 August 2020, Mecklenburg-Western Pomerania approved rebuilding the Barth–Zingst–Prerow line, with Deutsche Bahn expecting operations by 2028.

== Operating locations ==
=== Saatel railway station ===
Located one kilometre south of the village near the A105 motorway, Saatel station has a three-storey building, privately owned since 2003 and no longer used for railway purposes.

=== Barth railway station ===
Barth station, on the town's southern outskirts, was downgraded to a halt, with overhead lines dismantled in 2005. It retains a platform and station building, once housing a restaurant. The Usedomer Bäderbahn renovated it, reactivating a travel centre. A planning office for the Darßbahn recommissioning operates there. The station was the starting point for narrow-gauge railways to Damgarten and Stralsund, and the Barth harbour railway, operated by the Franzburger Kreisbahnen until nationalisation post-1945. The listed narrow-gauge reception building and locomotive shed, vacant and in disrepair, are slated for demolition.

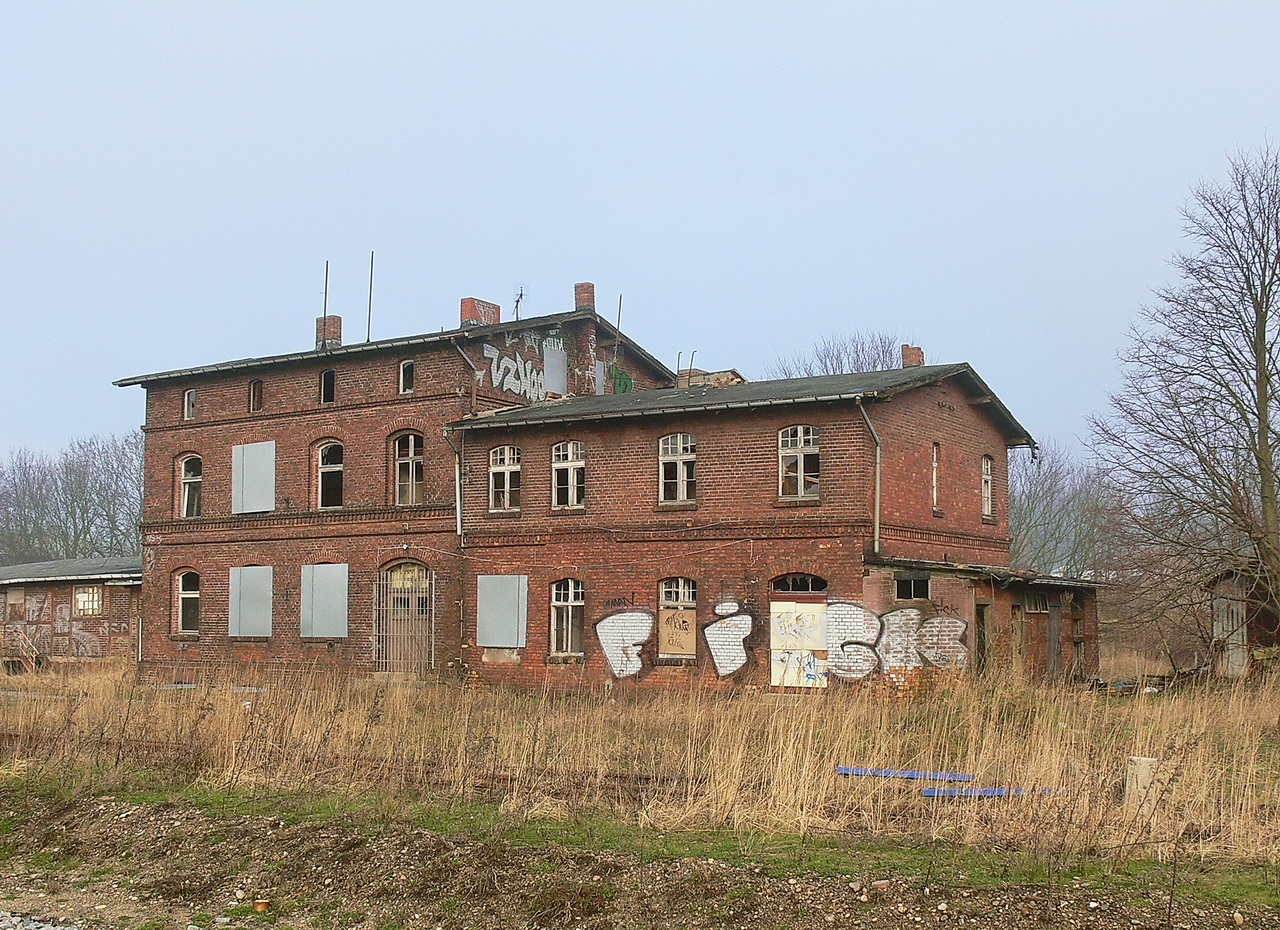
Reception building for the narrow-gauge railways in Barth

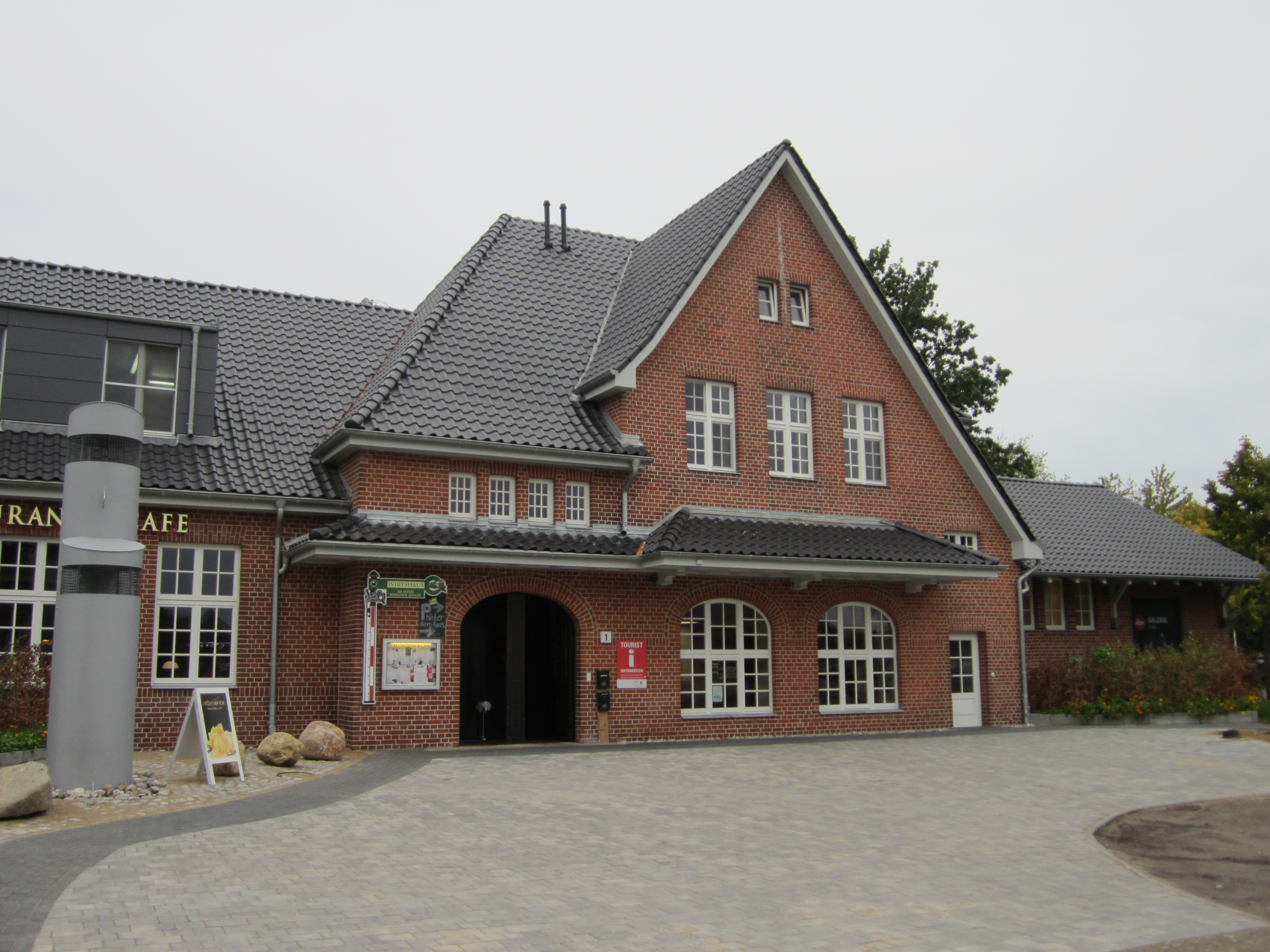
Zingst railway station (2012)

=== Prerow railway station ===
Prerow, the Darßbahn's terminus, features a 1910 North German brick building. After operations ceased in 1944, it stood empty until 1952, when it became a Ministry of Transport training school and summer holiday home. From 1989 to 2000, it was vacant, then converted into a guesthouse with a restaurant.

== Barth harbour railway ==
Barth's inland port on the Bodden waters, significant for timber transhipment during the GDR era, has had a three-track line since 1895, operated by the Franzburger Kreisbahnen until nationalisation. Passenger transport on the Stralsund–Barth–Damgarten line ended in 1968, followed by freight in 1969.

== Vehicle deployment ==
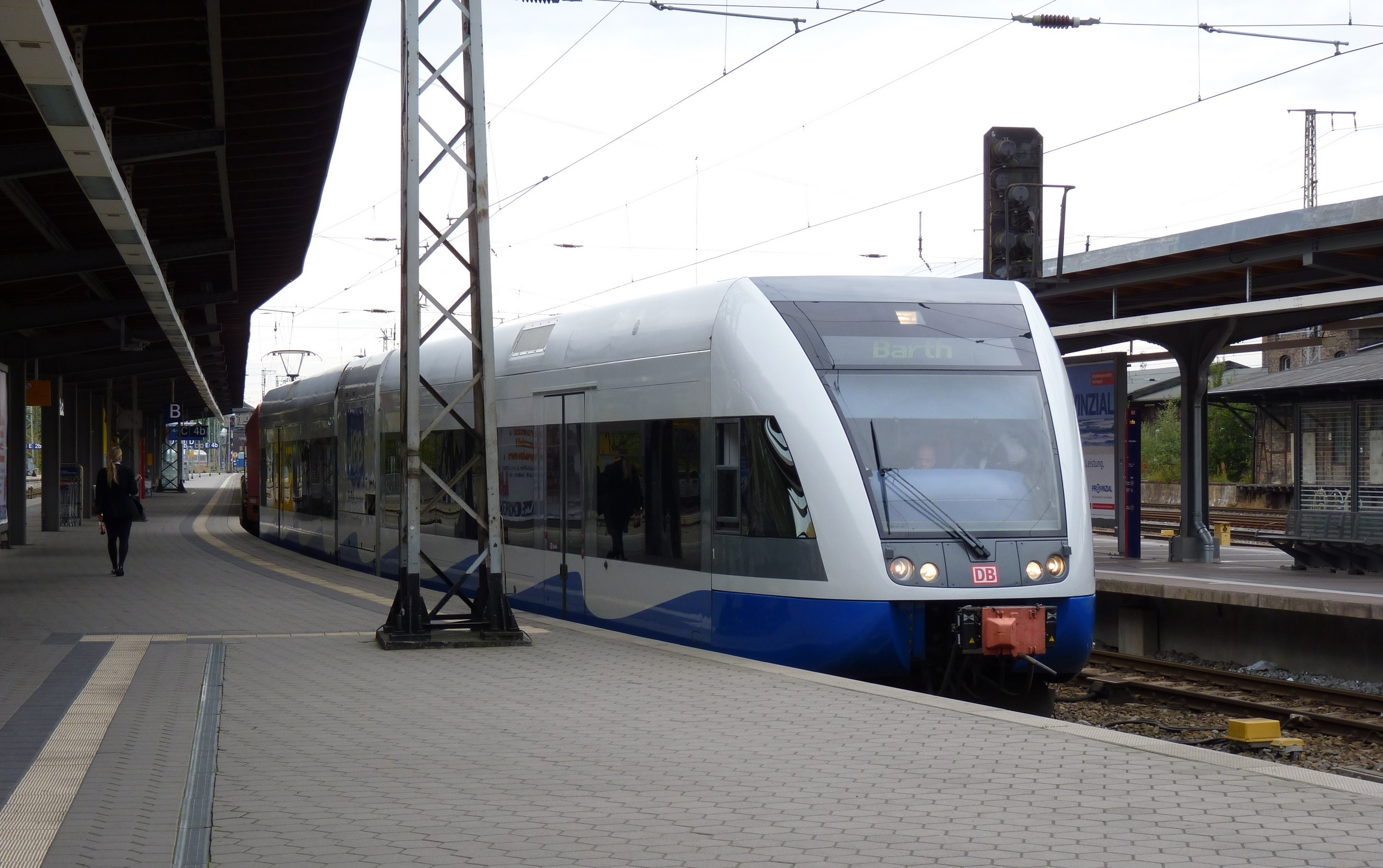
UBB railcar to Barth at Stralsund Central Station

The Prussian State Railway used its existing fleet, likely including the P 3.1 steam locomotive, turned on a 16-metre turntable in Prerow, with a maximum speed of 50 km/h due to the simple Form 8 rails and gravel bedding.

Freight traffic used Prussian class G 10 (series 57.1–3) and, from 1939, series 50 locomotives. Smaller BR 57 locomotives were turned manually in Prerow. A 16-metre turntable from Altefähr was installed in Barth in 1937.

Until the mid-1930s, passenger trains used tender locomotives of classes T 12 (series 74.4–13) and T 18 (series 78.0–5), replaced by series 64. In the 1970s and 1980s, DR V 100/110 diesel locomotives handled freight, with DR V 60, DR V 180, and DR V 200 (summer only) for express trains.
