= Ribnitz-Damgarten West station =

Railway station in Ribnitz-Damgarten, Germany

Ribnitz-Damgarten West
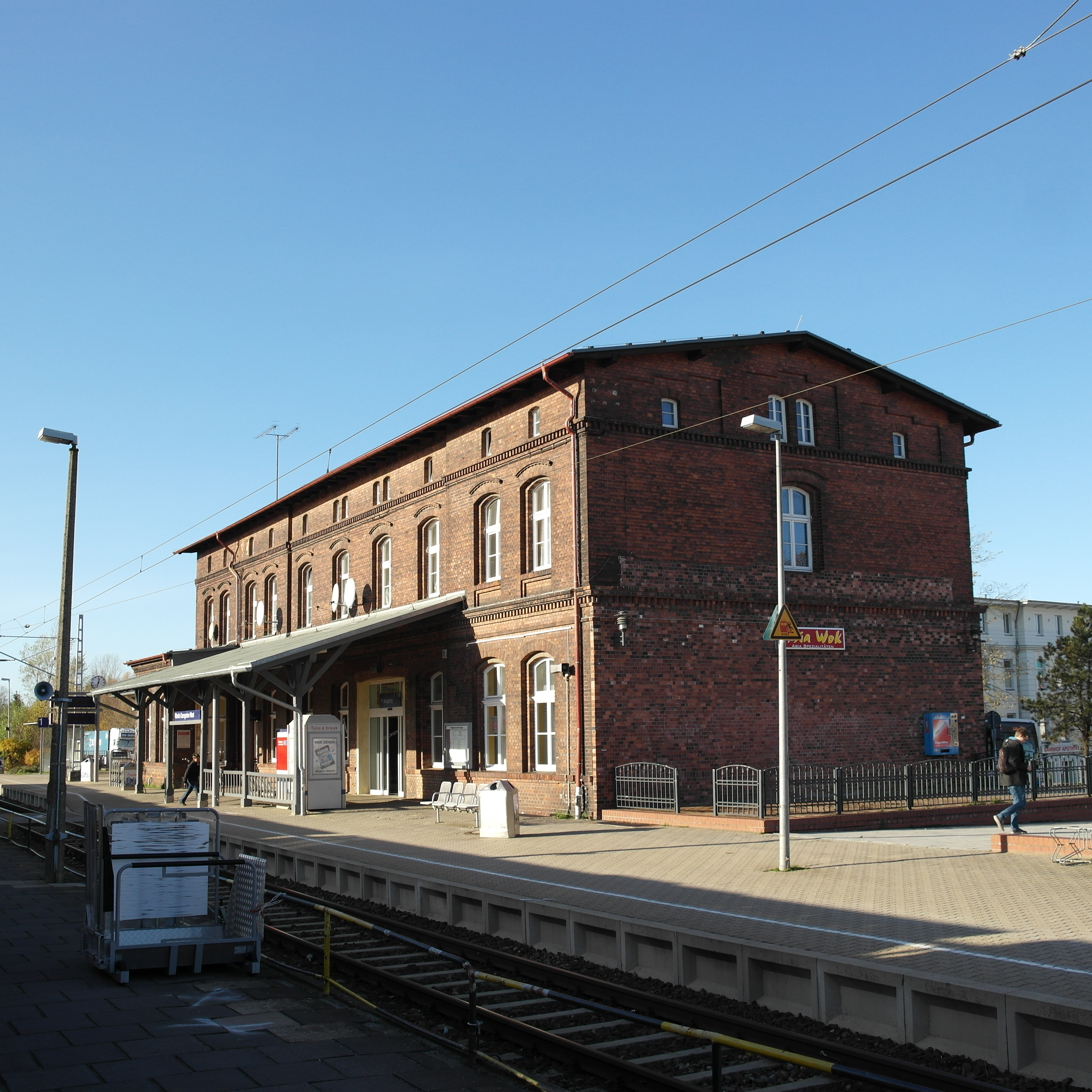

General information
- Location: Ribnitz-Damgarten, MV, Germany
- Coordinates: 54°14′21″N 12°26′13″E
- Line: Stralsund–Rostock railway
- Platforms: 2

Other information
- Website: www.bahnhof.de

History
- Opened: 1 July 1888; 138 years ago
- Electrified: 2 June 1991; 35 years ago
- Former names: 1888–1950: Ribnitz

Services
Preceding station	DB Fernverkehr	Following station
Rostock Hbf towards Hamburg-Altona	ICE 33	Velgast towards Ostseebad Binz
Preceding station	Ostdeutsche Eisenbahn	Following station
Gelbensande towards Rostock Hbf	RE 9	Ribnitz-Damgarten Ost towards Sassnitz or Ostseebad Binz
Location

Ribnitz-Damgarten West (German: Bahnhof Ribnitz-Damgarten West) is a railway station in the town of Ribnitz-Damgarten, Mecklenburg-Vorpommern, Germany. The station lies of the Stralsund–Rostock railway and the train services are operated by Deutsche Bahn.

== Rail services ==
In the 2026 timetable the following lines stop at the station:

Line	Route	Frequency
ICE 33	Binz/Greifswald – Stralsund – Ribnitz-Damgarten West – Rostock – Schwerin – Hamburg	5 train pairs
RE 9	Sassnitz – Sagard – Lietzow (Rügen) – Bergen auf Rügen – Samtens – Stralsund – Ribnitz-Damgarten West – Velgast – Rostock	Every 2 hours
RE 10	Rostock – Ribnitz-Damgarten West – Velgast – Stralsund – Greifswald – Züssow – Pasewalk	2 train pairs, Mon–Fri
RB 12	Rostock – Rövershagen – Ribnitz-Damgarten West	2 train pairs, Mon–Fri
