= Neu Bartelshagen =

- Ortsteil of Niepars
- Interactive map of Neu Bartelshagen
- Location within Germany Location within Mecklenburg-Vorpommern
- Coordinates: 54°21′N 12°52′E
- Country: Germany
- State: Mecklenburg-Vorpommern
- District: Vorpommern-Rügen
- Municipality: Niepars

Area
  - Total: 17.36 km^{2} (6.70 sq mi)
- Elevation: 1 m (3.3 ft)

Population (2017-12-31)
  - Total: 320
  - Density: 18/km^{2} (48/sq mi)
- Time zone: UTC+01:00 (CET)
  - Summer (DST): UTC+02:00 (CEST)
- Postal codes: 18442
- Dialling codes: 038321
- Vehicle registration: NVP
- Website: www.neubartelshagen.de

Neu Bartelshagen is a village and a former municipality in the Vorpommern-Rügen district, in Mecklenburg-Vorpommern, Germany. Since May 2019, it is part of the municipality Niepars.
