= Kummerow, Nordvorpommern =

Kummerow
- Ortsteil of Niepars
- Interactive map of Kummerow
- Location within Germany Location within Mecklenburg-Vorpommern
- Coordinates: 54°18′N 12°53′E
- Country: Germany
- State: Mecklenburg-Vorpommern
- District: Vorpommern-Rügen
- Municipality: Niepars

Area
  - Total: 11.55 km^{2} (4.46 sq mi)
- Elevation: 5 m (16 ft)

Population (2017-12-31)
  - Total: 316
  - Density: 27.4/km^{2} (70.9/sq mi)
- Time zone: UTC+01:00 (CET)
  - Summer (DST): UTC+02:00 (CEST)
- Postal codes: 18442
- Dialling codes: 038321
- Vehicle registration: NVP
- Website: www. niepars.de

Kummerow is a village and a former municipality in the Vorpommern-Rügen district, in Mecklenburg-Vorpommern, Germany. Since May 2019, it is part of the municipality of Niepars.
