= Niepars =

- Municipality
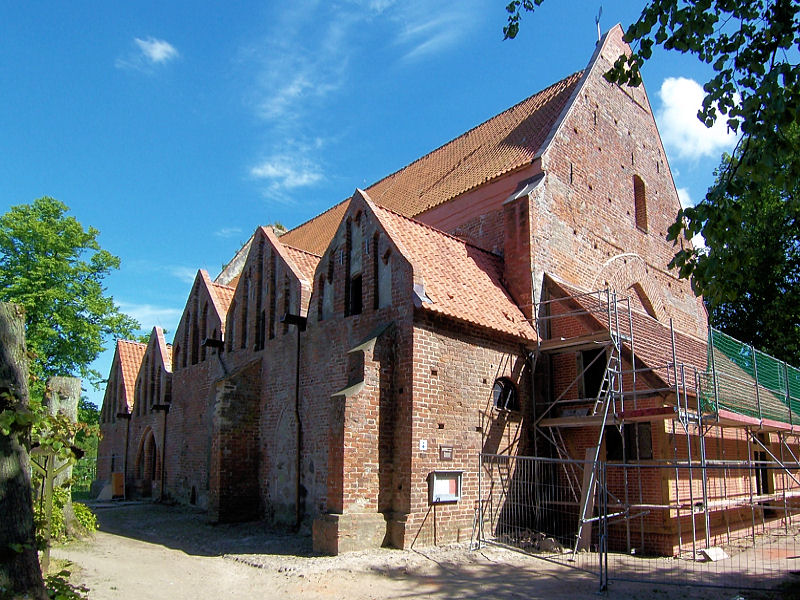
- Medieval church in Niepars

- Coat of arms

- Location of Niepars within Vorpommern-Rügen district
- Interactive map of Niepars
- Location within Germany Location within Mecklenburg-Vorpommern
- Coordinates: 54°19′N 12°55′E
- Country: Germany
- State: Mecklenburg-Vorpommern
- District: Vorpommern-Rügen
- Municipal assoc.: Niepars

Government
  - Mayor: Bärbel Schilling

Area
  - Total: 64.86 km^{2} (25.04 sq mi)
- Elevation: 27 m (89 ft)

Population (2025-12-31)
  - Total: 2,511
  - Density: 38.71/km^{2} (100.3/sq mi)
- Time zone: UTC+01:00 (CET)
  - Summer (DST): UTC+02:00 (CEST)
- Postal codes: 18442
- Dialling codes: 038321
- Vehicle registration: VR
- Website: www.gemeinde-niepars.de

Niepars is a municipality in the Vorpommern-Rügen district, in Mecklenburg-Vorpommern, Germany. The former municipalities Kummerow and Neu Bartelshagen were merged into Niepars in May 2019.
