= Sagard station =

Railway station in Sagard, Germany

Sagard
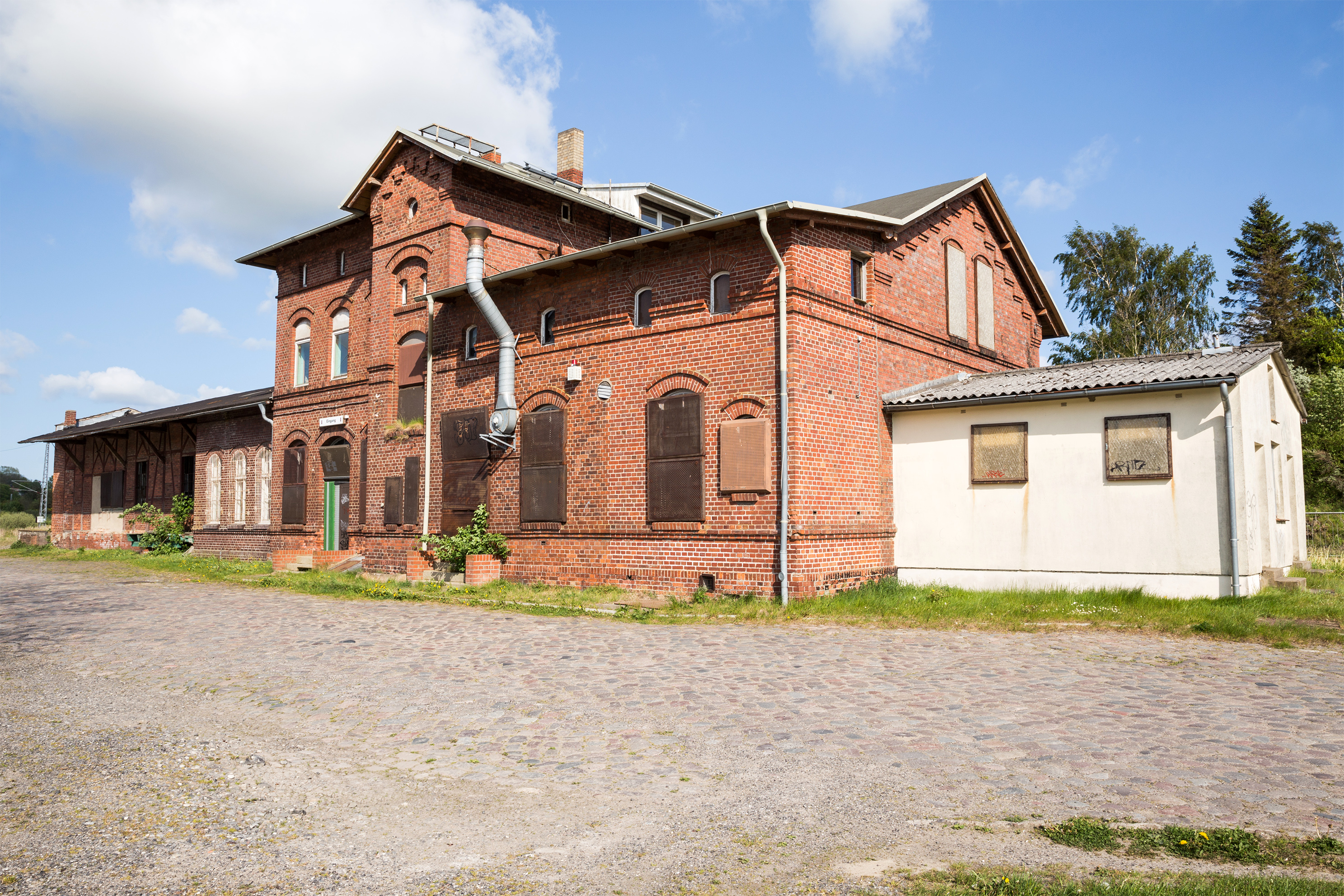
- Sagard railway station

General information
- Location: Sagard, MV, Germany
- Coordinates: 54°31′26″N 13°33′53″E
- Line: Stralsund-Sassnitz railway
- Platforms: 2
- Tracks: 2
- Train operators: ODEG

History
- Opened: 1 July 1891; 135 years ago
- Electrified: 27 May 1989; 37 years ago

Services
Preceding station	Ostdeutsche Eisenbahn	Following station
Lietzow (Rügen) towards Rostock Hbf	RE 9	Lancken towards Sassnitz
Location

Sagard (German: Bahnhof Sagard) is a railway station in the town of Sagard, Mecklenburg-Vorpommern, Germany. The station lies on the Stralsund-Sassnitz railway and the train services are operated by Ostdeutsche Eisenbahn GmbH.

== Train services ==
The station is served by the following service(s):

- Regional services RE 9 Rostock - Velgast - Stralsund - Lietzow - Sassnitz
