= Ahrenshagen-Daskow =

- Municipality
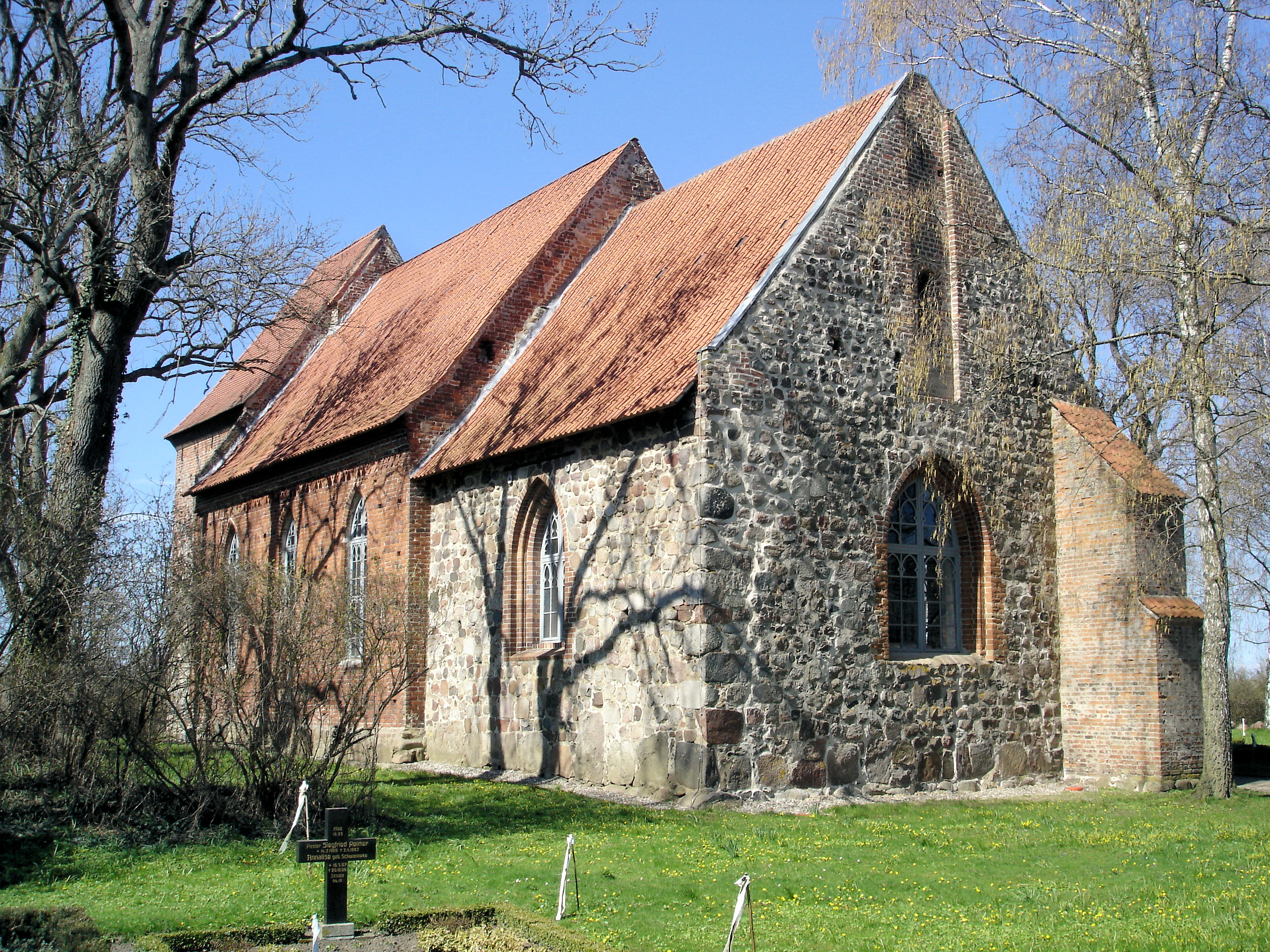
- The church of Ahrenshagen-Daskow

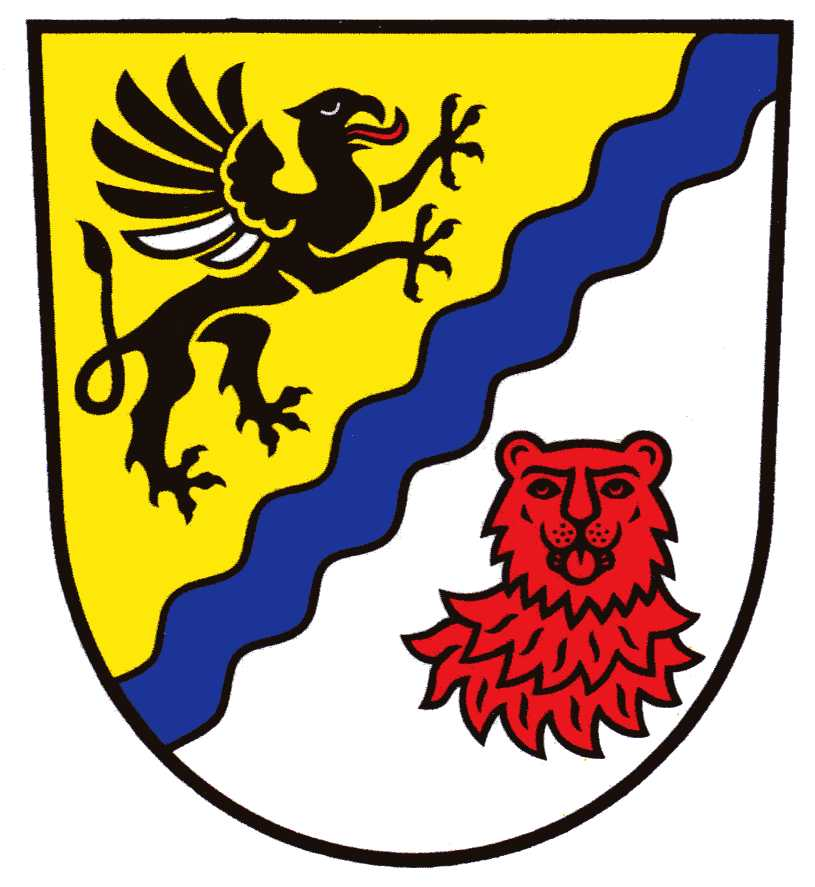
- Coat of arms

- Location of Ahrenshagen-Daskow within Vorpommern-Rügen district
- Interactive map of Ahrenshagen-Daskow
- Location within Germany Location within Mecklenburg-Vorpommern
- Coordinates: 54°13′43″N 12°35′32″E
- Country: Germany
- State: Mecklenburg-Vorpommern
- District: Vorpommern-Rügen
- Municipal assoc.: Ribnitz-Damgarten

Government
  - Mayor: Hagen Oelckers

Area
  - Total: 58.32 km^{2} (22.52 sq mi)
- Elevation: 22 m (72 ft)

Population (2025-12-31)
  - Total: 2,126
  - Density: 36.45/km^{2} (94.42/sq mi)
- Time zone: UTC+01:00 (CET)
  - Summer (DST): UTC+02:00 (CEST)
- Postal codes: 18320
- Dialling codes: 03821, 038222, 038225
- Vehicle registration: NVP
- Website: www.ribnitz-damgarten.de

Ahrenshagen-Daskow is a municipality in the Vorpommern-Rügen district, in Mecklenburg-Vorpommern, Germany.
