= Velgast =

- Municipality
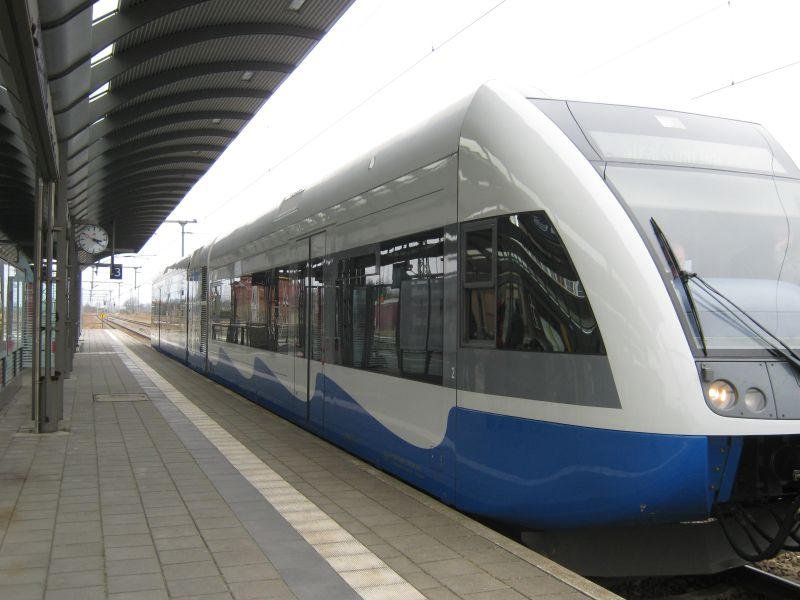
- Velgast railway station

- Coat of arms

- Location of Velgast within Vorpommern-Rügen district
- Interactive map of Velgast
- Location within Germany Location within Mecklenburg-Vorpommern
- Coordinates: 54°16′11″N 12°55′41″E
- Country: Germany
- State: Mecklenburg-Vorpommern
- District: Vorpommern-Rügen
- Municipal assoc.: Franzburg-Richtenberg

Government
  - Mayor: Christian Griwahn

Area
  - Total: 71.42 km^{2} (27.58 sq mi)
- Elevation: 3 m (9.8 ft)

Population (2025-12-31)
  - Total: 1,462
  - Density: 20.47/km^{2} (53.02/sq mi)
- Time zone: UTC+01:00 (CET)
  - Summer (DST): UTC+02:00 (CEST)
- Postal codes: 18469
- Dialling codes: 038324
- Vehicle registration: NVP
- Website: www.amt-franzburg-richtenberg.de

Velgast is a municipality in the Vorpommern-Rügen district, in Mecklenburg-Vorpommern, Germany. Velgast has its own railway station.

== Districts ==
The community Velgast has the following districts:

- Altenhagen
- Bussin
- Hoevet
- Lendershagen
- Neu Seehagen
- Schuenhagen
- Starkow
- Velgast
- Manschenhagen
- Sternhagen
