= Lietzow (Rügen) station =

Railway station in Lietzow, Germany

Lietzow (Rügen)
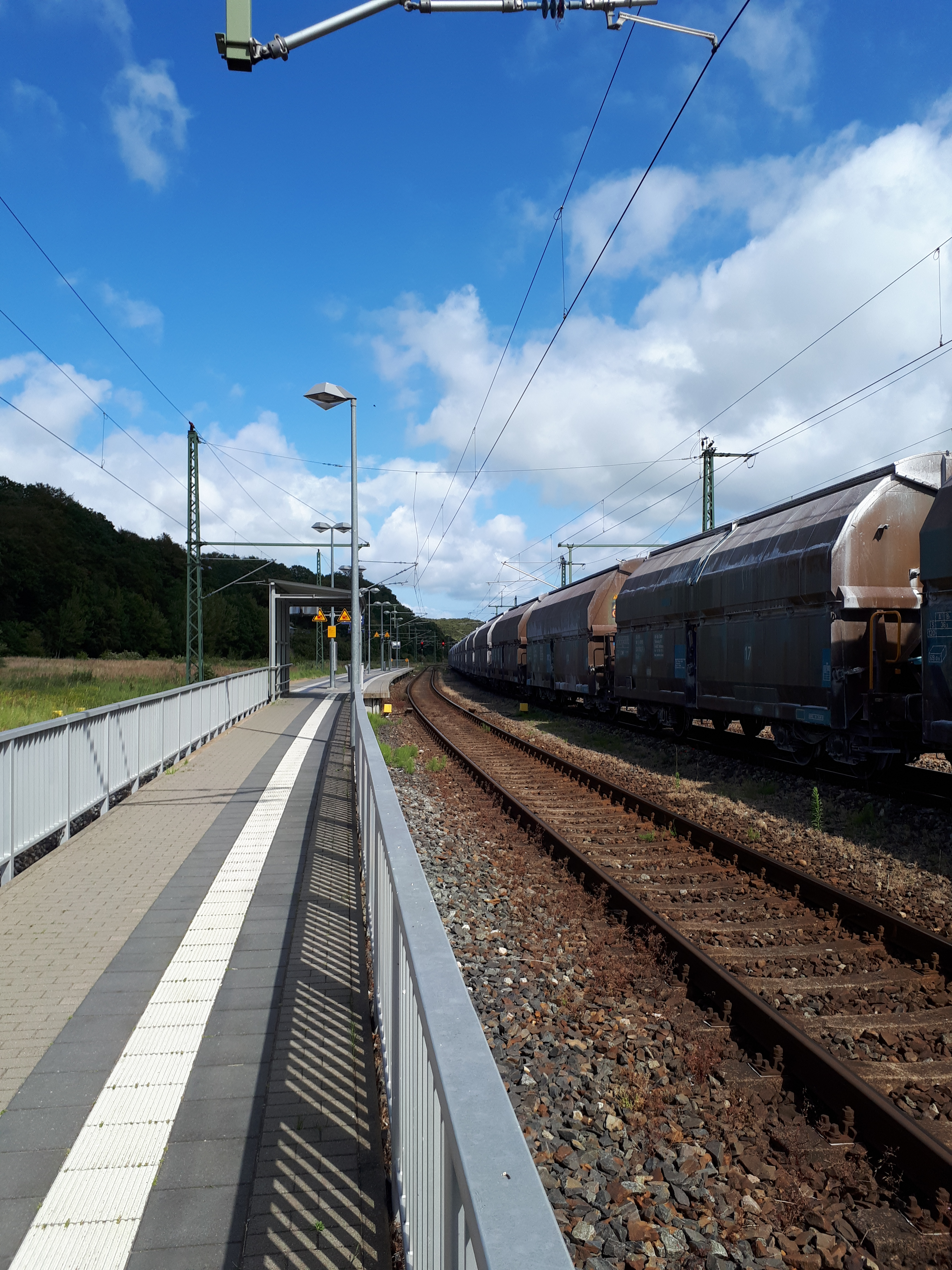
- 2019

General information
- Location: Lietzow, MV, Germany
- Coordinates: 54°28′52″N 13°30′40″E
- Owner: Deutsche Bahn
- Operator: DB Station&Service
- Lines: Stralsund–Sassnitz railway Lietzow–Binz railway
- Platforms: 3
- Tracks: 11
- Train operators: ODEG
- Connections: RE 9

Other information
- Website: www.bahnhof.de

History
- Opened: 1 July 1891; 135 years ago
- Electrified: 27 May 1989; 37 years ago

Services
Preceding station	Ostdeutsche Eisenbahn	Following station
Bergen auf Rügen towards Rostock Hbf	RE 9	Prora towards Ostseebad Binz
Bergen auf Rügen towards Rostock Hbf	RE 9	Sagard towards Sassnitz
Location

Lietzow (Rügen) (German: Bahnhof Lietzow (Rügen)) is a railway station in the town of Lietzow, Mecklenburg-Vorpommern, Germany. The station lies on the Stralsund-Sassnitz railway and Lietzow-Binz railway. The train services are operated by Ostdeutsche Eisenbahn GmbH.

== Train services ==
The station is served by the following service(s):

- Regional services RE 9 Rostock - Velgast - Stralsund - Lietzow - Sassnitz/Binz
