= Stralsund–Rostock railway =

Railway station in Germany

Stralsund–Rostock
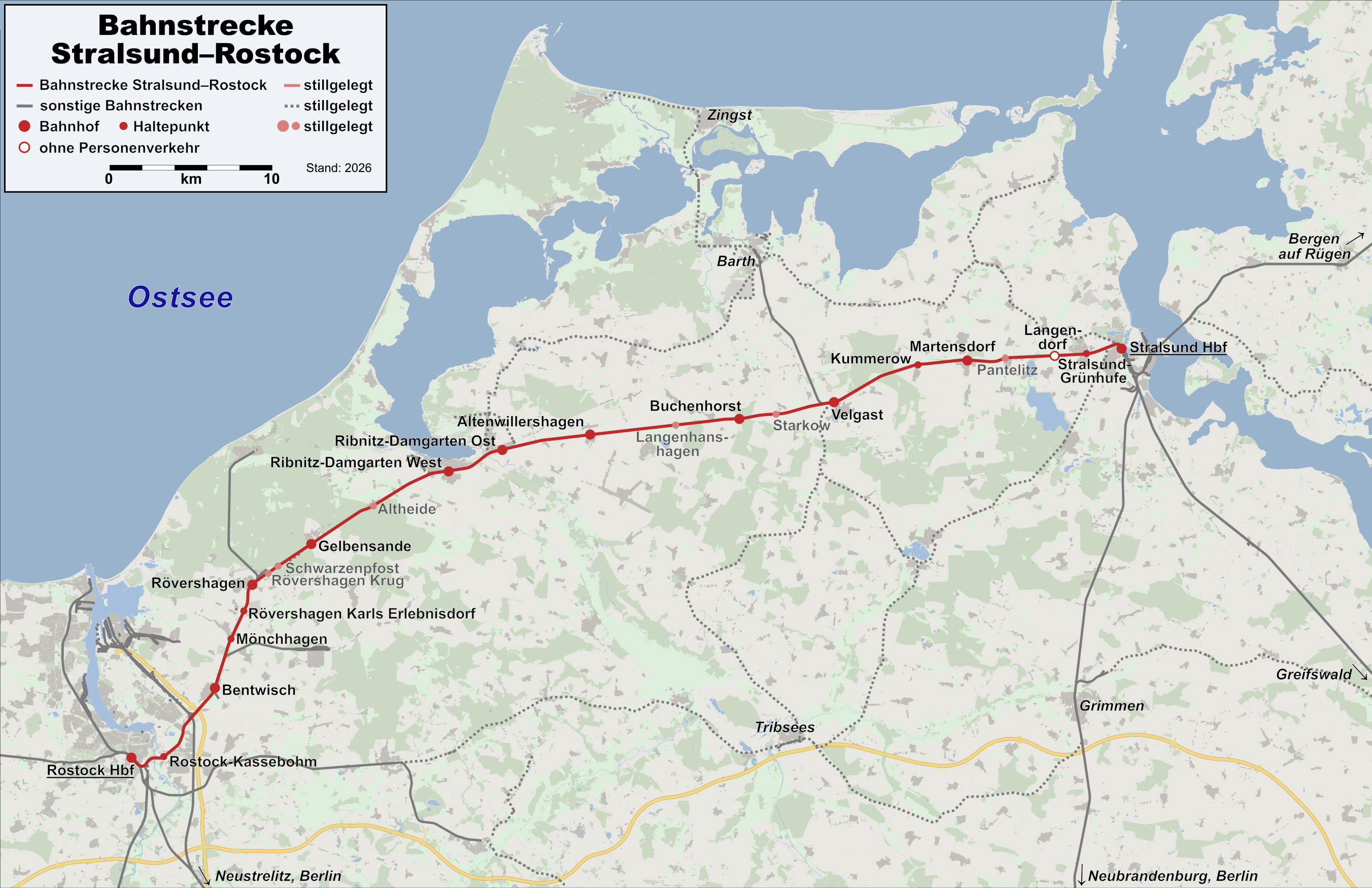

Overview
- Line number: 6322
- Locale: Mecklenburg-Vorpommern, Germany

Service
- Route number: 190

Technical
- Line length: 72.0 km (44.7 mi)
- Track gauge: 1,435 mm (4 ft 8 1/2 in) standard gauge
- Electrification: 15 kV/16.7 Hz AC overhead catenary
- Operating speed: 160 km/h (99.4 mph) (maximum)

The Stralsund–Rostock railway connects the two Hanseatic cities in the north of the German state of Mecklenburg-Vorpommern. The single-track electrified main line is part of the German Unity Transport Project (German: Verkehrsprojektes Deutsche Einheit) No. 1 (Lübeck–Rostock–Stralsund).

== History ==
The railway line was built to provide a direct rail link between the two Hanseatic cities of Rostock and Stralsund and to open up the area in between. Prussia proposed a single-track main line, while Mecklenburg considered that a branch line would be sufficient. The concession was authorised by a treaty of 15 December 1884. The track was built by the Prussian state railways and officially opened on 1 July 1888. The Mecklenburg government participated only financially. The line crossed the boundary between the Grand Duchy of Mecklenburg-Schwerin and the Prussian province of Pomerania between Ribnitz and Damgarten. The original plan was that the Stralsund–Ribnitz section would run via Barth. This section had been surveyed. However, the shorter connection via Velgast was selected to reduce the construction costs.

The management of operations on Prussian territory, that is from Stralsund to Damgarten, was initially carried out by the Prussian state railways, while operations on the section through Mecklenburg were carried out by the Friedrich-Franz Railway. The necessary locomotives exchange took place in Ribnitz station (now Ribnitz-Damgarten West). After the maintenance of the Prussian locomotives in Rostock in Mecklenburg had been agreed under an international treaty, the operations were completely taken over by the Prussian state railways. Passenger services on the line ended at the station of the Friedrich-Franz Railway in the southeast of Rostock’s old town, which was later used as a freight yard. A direct connection to Rostock Hauptbahnhof was opened in 1905.

During the following years more branch lines developed along the line. Thus, connections were gradually built to Prerow via Barth (the Darß Railway of the Prussian state railways), to Tribsees (the Velgast–Tribsees/Franzburg railway) and Graal-Müritz (the Rövershagen–Graal-Müritz railway). As a result of the construction of these branch lines the stations of Rövershagen and Velgast developed into railway junction. Velgast station gained special importance with the building of the branches to Prerow and Tribsees.

The line initially built as a branch line was declared to be a main line in 1926.

=== 1950–1989 ===
During the period of the German Democratic Republic, the line was connected to many military and business sidings. In the late 1950s a branch was built to the north of the line to the north port of Rostock with a link towards Rostock and towards Bentwisch on the line to Stralsund.

The other major connection was the industrial railway to the fertilizer plant at Poppendorf. The military sidings connected from Ribnitz-Damgarten Ost to Pütnitz (airfield) and from Gelbensande to Schwarzenpfost, running for a few metres parallel and adjacent to the main line through the woods. Also the fiberboard plant in Ribnitz was connected with a works railway.

The line was progressively electrificatied in the following stages from 1985:

1. Rostock Hauptbahnhof–Rostock freight yard: 15 December 1985
2. Riekdahl–Bentwisch: 12 April 1986
3. Bentwisch–Poppendorf: 30 May 1986
4. Bentwisch–Stralsund: 2 June 1991.

The last scheduled steam train ran on this line on 29 March 1985.

=== 1990–2010 ===
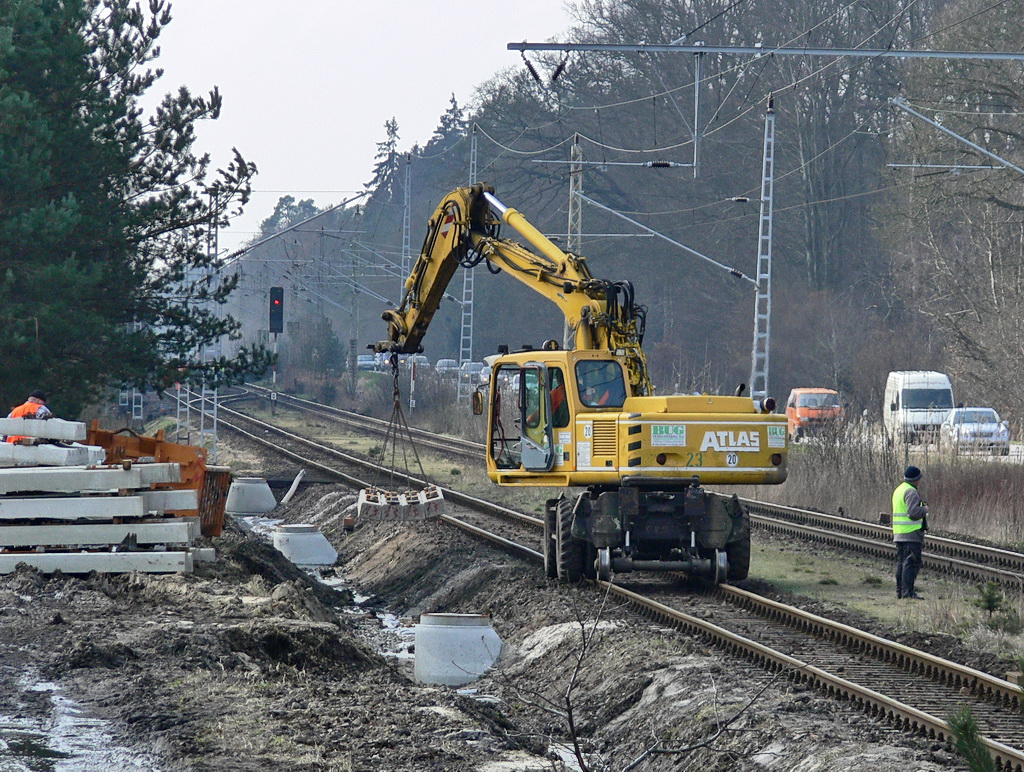
Construction work in Gelbensande station

After Die Wende in 1989, many sidings and stations were closed and later partly dismantled (such as Rostock freight yard). The sidings for the military trains of the National People’s Army were no longer needed and have been completely dismantled, the stations of Schwarzenpfost, Altheide, Langenhanshagen, Starkov and Pantelitz have not been served since 1996. In addition the last local freight train operated in 1996.

In 1999, the section between Ribnitz-Damgarten West and Stralsund was completely renovated. The appearance of the stations on the track changed greatly. The signal boxes were replaced by a new electronic interlocking in Velgast. Consequently, all signal boxes that were no longer needed and freight sidings were demolished and the interlocking equipment that was housed in the old station buildings was removed. The remaining buildings are largely empty, and have been secured against unauthorised entry. The closed stations were completely demolished in the course of the renovation. But, after the renovation of the track, a new station was opened in Stralsund Grünhufe.

The redevelopment of the remainder of the section between Rostock and Ribnitz-Damgarten West was begun, but has been repeatedly deferred. As a result, almost all of the line on this section has not been upgraded. All stations are still staffed and the line is protected by signals controlled by relay interlocking at local signal boxes. During the line upgrade, the track in the section between Rostock and Ribnitz–Damgarten West was to be doubled because of the current high train density. A second track was also planned on the Velgast–Stralsund section. All culverts and bridges were already designed for a second track in 1999. After the outcome of the review of the demand plan for federal railway infrastructure of 11 November 2010, it was decided not to pursue the project because of its unfavourable benefit-cost ratio.

=== Construction ===
In March 2007, the first works were carried out for upgrading the Rostock–Ribnitz-Damgarten West section to be operated at 160 km/h. Substantial work was especially carried out in the stations of Bentwisch, Gelbensande and Ribnitz-Damgarten West. Further work took place in the spring of 2008. Additional platforms were restored along the line and refuge tracks and freight tracks were removed in stations. The western section was not initially connected to the electronic interlocking at Velgast.

== Passenger services ==
=== Regional services ===
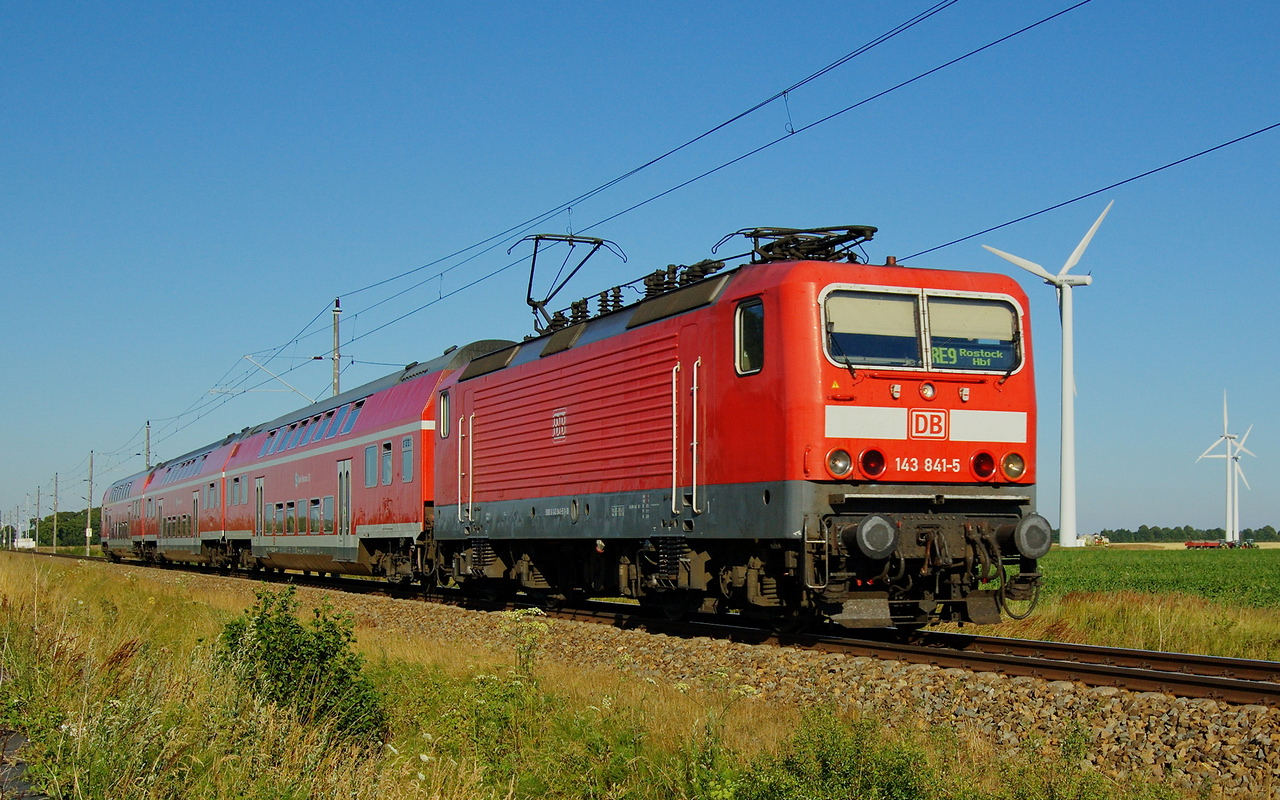
Class 143 with double-deck carriages near Ribnitz-Damgarten Ost

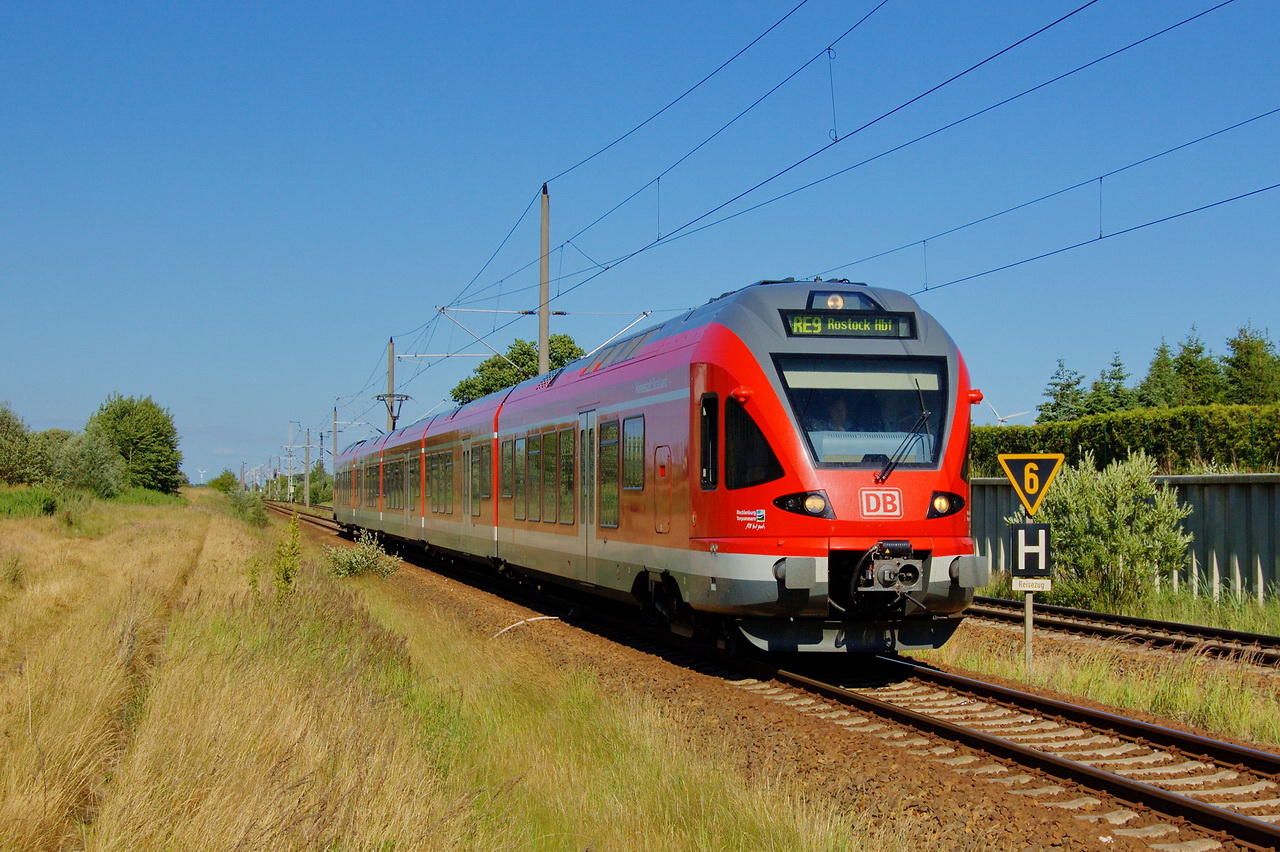
Deutschen Bahn Stadler FLIRT railcars running as the Hanse-Express

Regional services operate on the line at two-hour intervals between the two cities. Since December 2007, these have been operated using Stadler FLIRT railcars, which, because of their greater acceleration and higher speed, have reduced travel time on some sections. Before the introduction of the new railcars, trains often consisted of three double-decker cars hauled by a class 143 locomotive.

On the Rostock–Rövershagen section there is an additional hourly direct train to Graal-Müritz. For this reason, the stations of Rostock-Kassebohm, Bentwisch and Mönchhagen are not generally served by Regional-Express trains towards Stralsund. Railcars of class 642 (Siemens Desiro) or class 628 are used towards Graal-Müritz. Every two hours Usedomer Bäderbahn (UBB) trains operated between Stralsund and Velgast using class 646 railcars until 2017. They continued on the UBB network to Barth. Since they now run only between Velgast and Barth, although approximately hourly, Kummerow (b Stralsund) station is no longer served by any trains.

=== Long-distance services ===
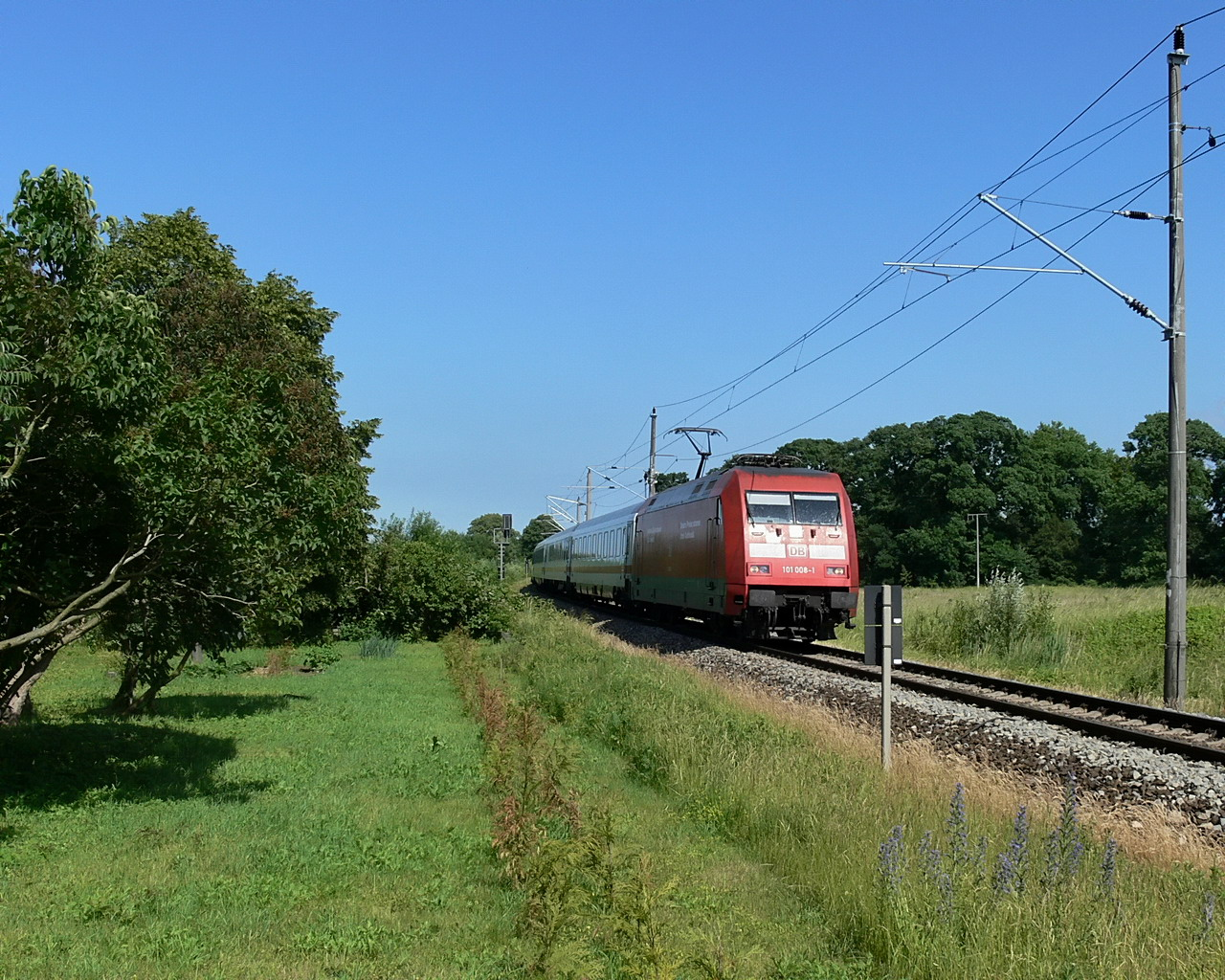
An IC train near Ribnitz-Damgarten

The line is served several times a day by long-distance trains. The Intercity trains stop at the stations of Rostock Hauptbahnhof, Ribnitz-Damgarten West, Velgast and Stralsund Hauptbahnhof. Several trains continue from Stralsund to Ostseebad Binz on Rügen. These continue to Hamburg and the Ruhr. Until October 2007, a night train operated from Stralsund to Munich and to the Ruhr. In the summer a train regularly runs on the route from Dortmund to Sassnitz, carrying vacationers from the Ruhr to the Baltic Sea. Another Intercity train runs as the UrlaubsExpress (Holiday Express) Mecklenburg-Vorpommern from Cologne via Hamburg, Rostock and Stralsund to the seaside resort of Heringsdorf on the island of Usedom.

A special feature of the line is that all long-distance trains between Rostock and Stralsund may be used with local public transport tickets. This excludes the so-called Ländertickets and Schöne-Wochenende-Tickets.

Since the timetable change in 2005, there are no longer any strictly two-hour intervals services on the line. The reason for this was the only way to shorten the times taken by the long-distance trains to Hamburg. In order to speed up regional services and to offer the long-demanded trains from Rostock to Rügen, it was necessary for the long-distance trains to stop at crossing station to wait for regional services.

== Freight traffic ==
The line is used for regional freight traffic, but it is also important for interregional traffic. So the big freight yards of Rostock Seehafen (seaport) and Sassnitz-Mukran on Rügen are served by freight traffic on the line. There are also two works sidings on the line that can be served. The biggest works sidings is the fertilizer plant in Poppendorf. It has its own works station. For some time, sidings and a works station was operated at Yara Rostock. The other siding is located in Rövershagen where a local gas supplier is served.

Line

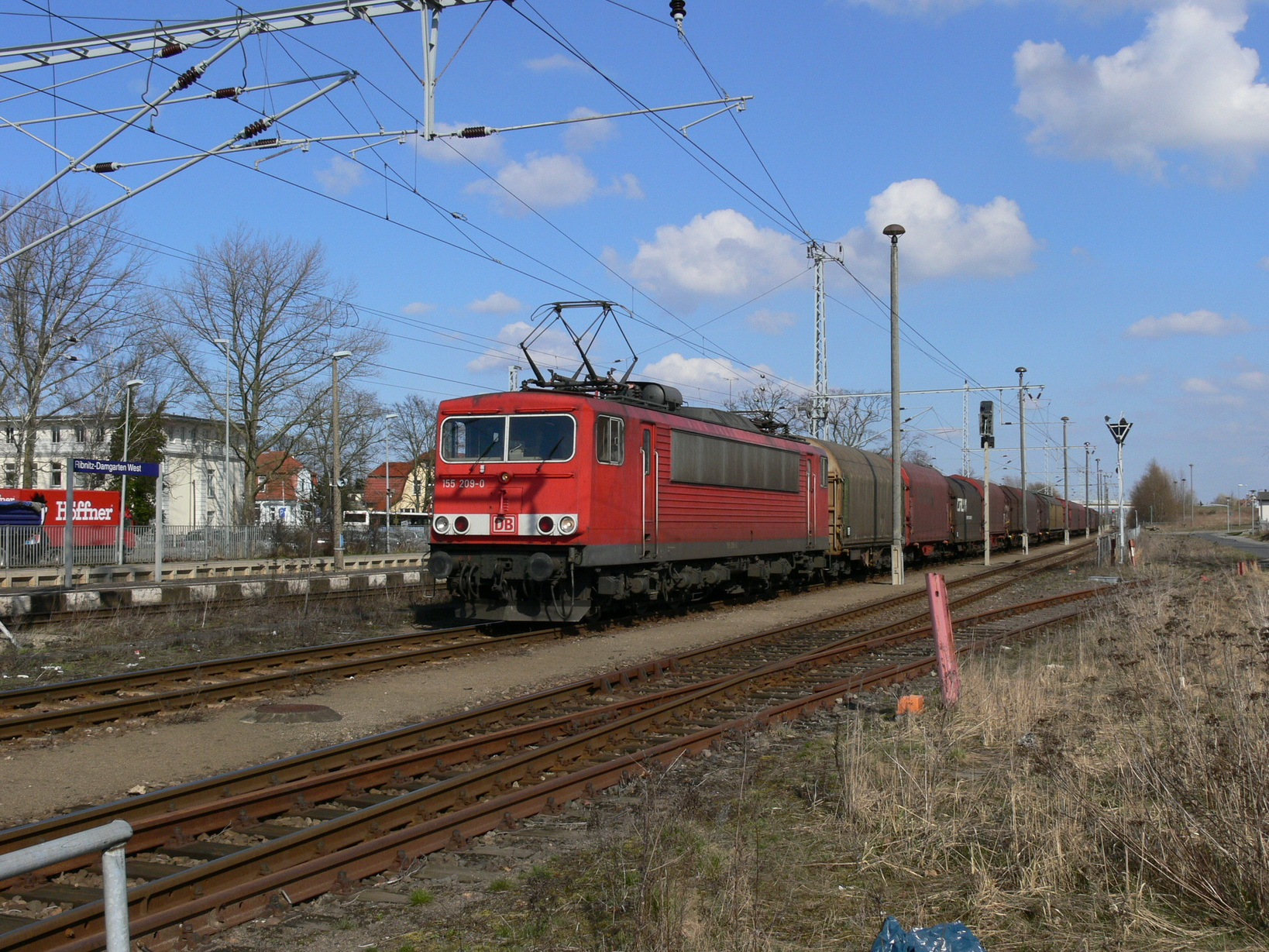
Freight train in Ribnitz-Damgarten West

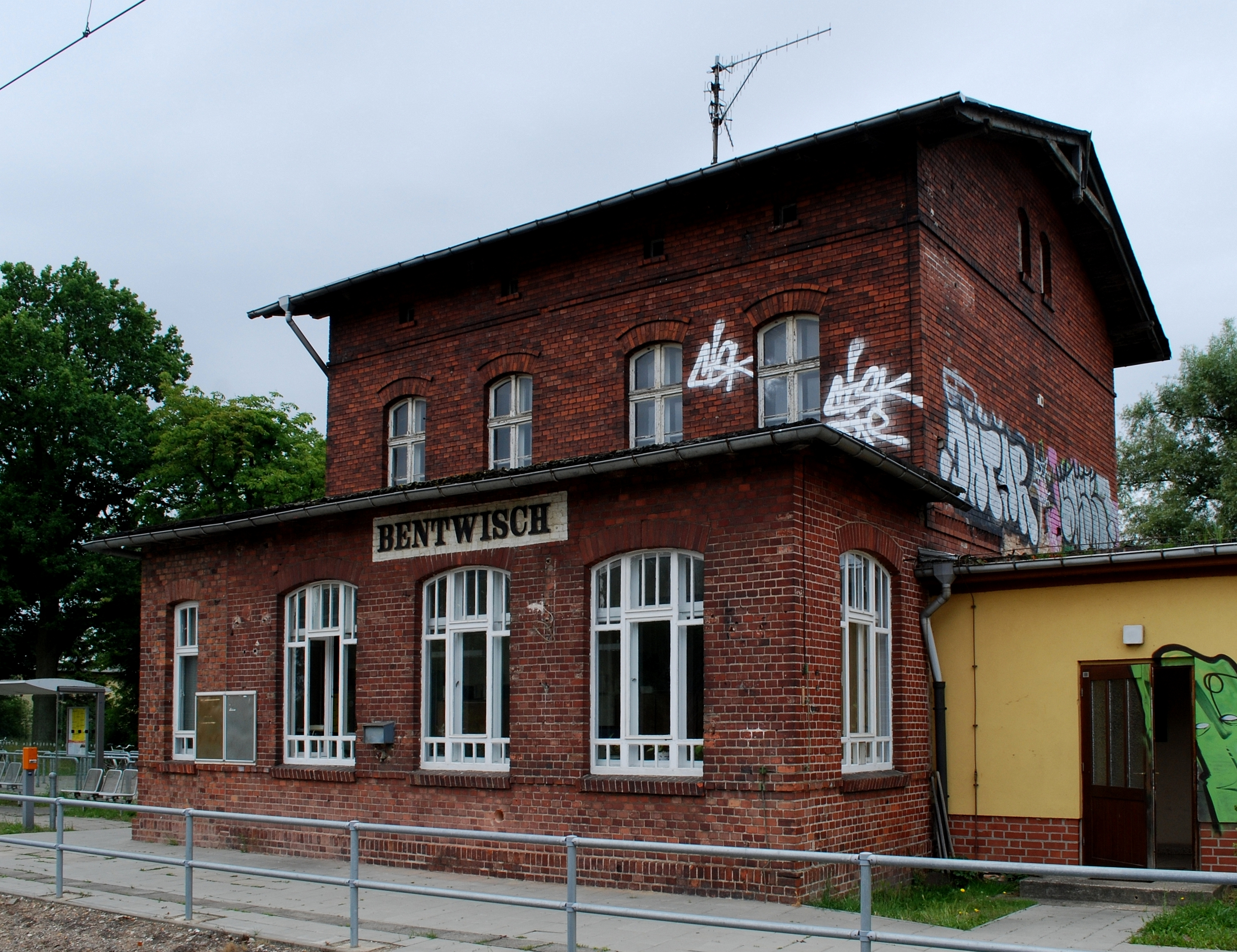
Bentwisch station

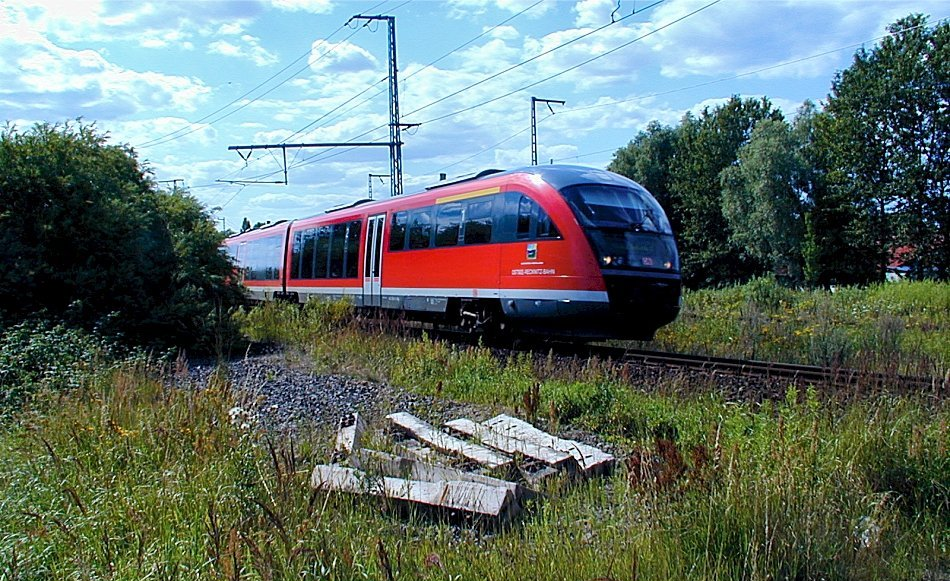
S-Bahn train to Rostock Seehafen Nord shortly before Rostock-Kassebohm S-Bahn station

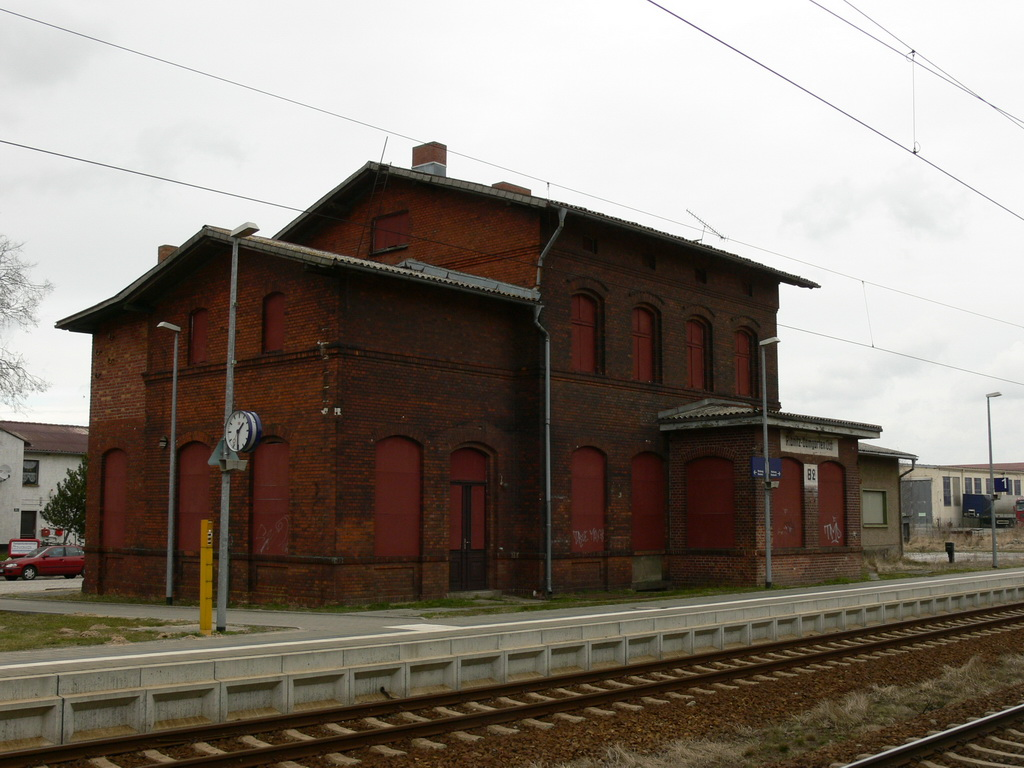
Station building on the upgraded Ribnitz-Damgarten Ost section

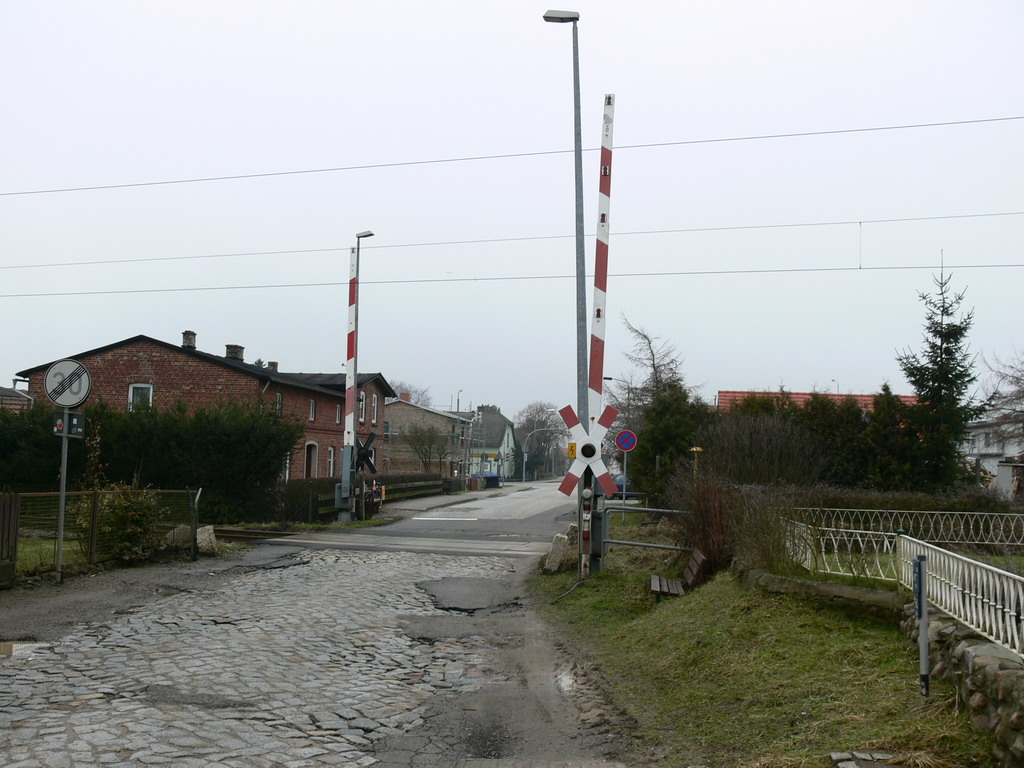
Old level crossing protection technology in Mönchhagen

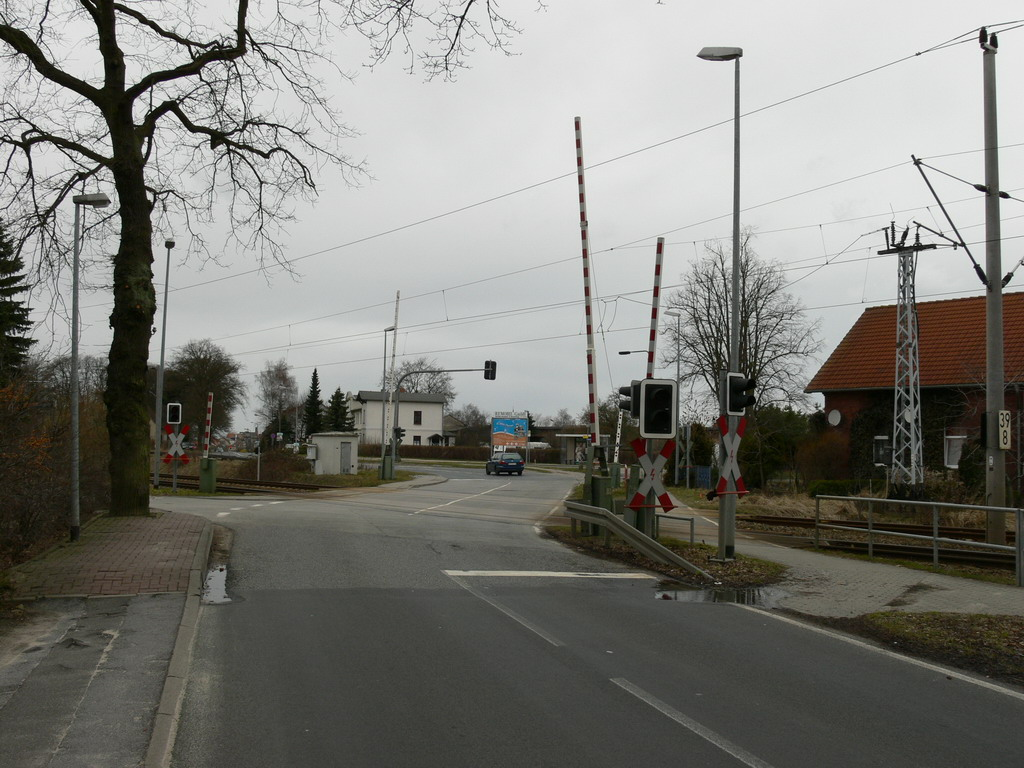
New level crossing protection technology in Damgarten

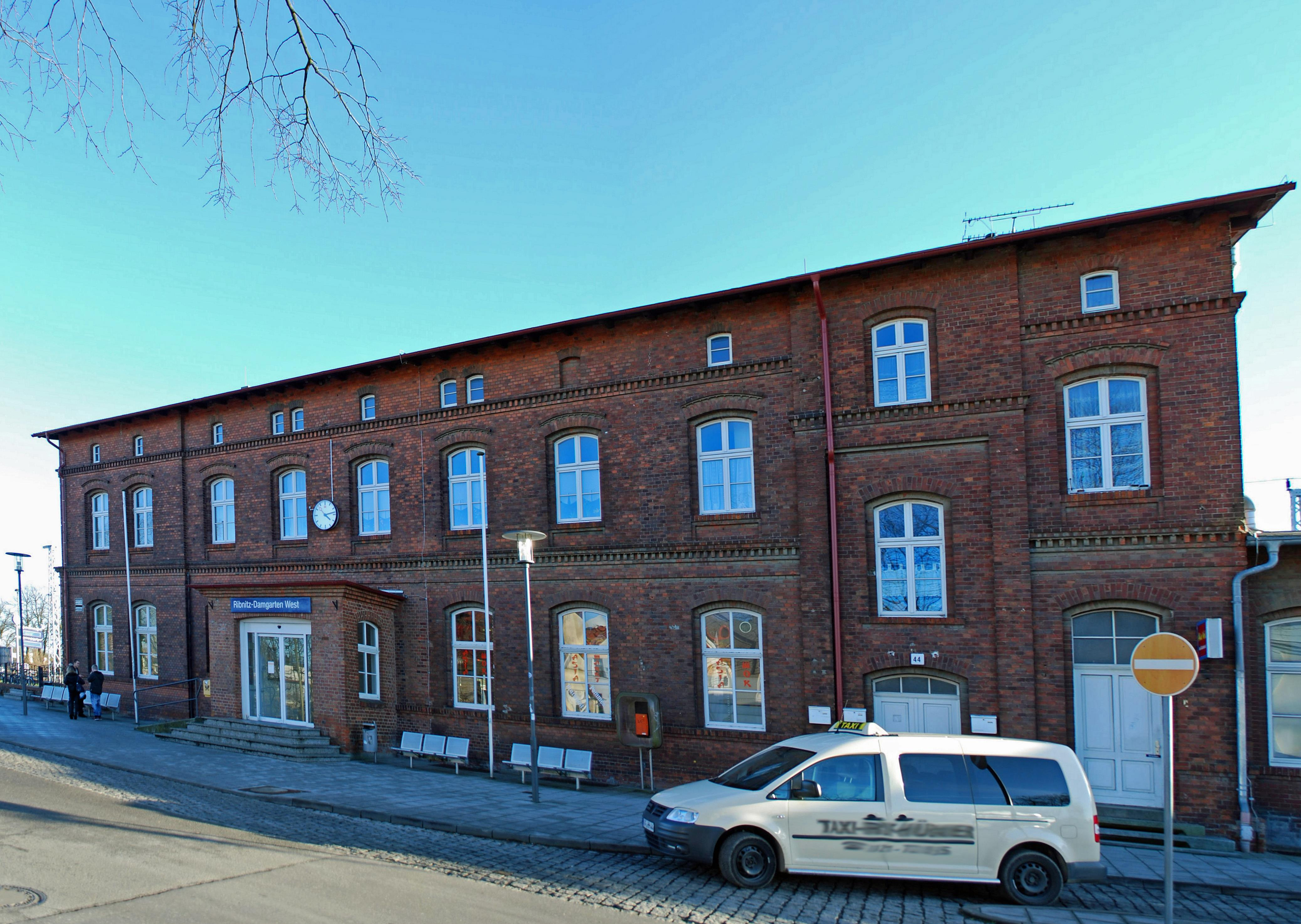
Ribnitz-Damgarten West station

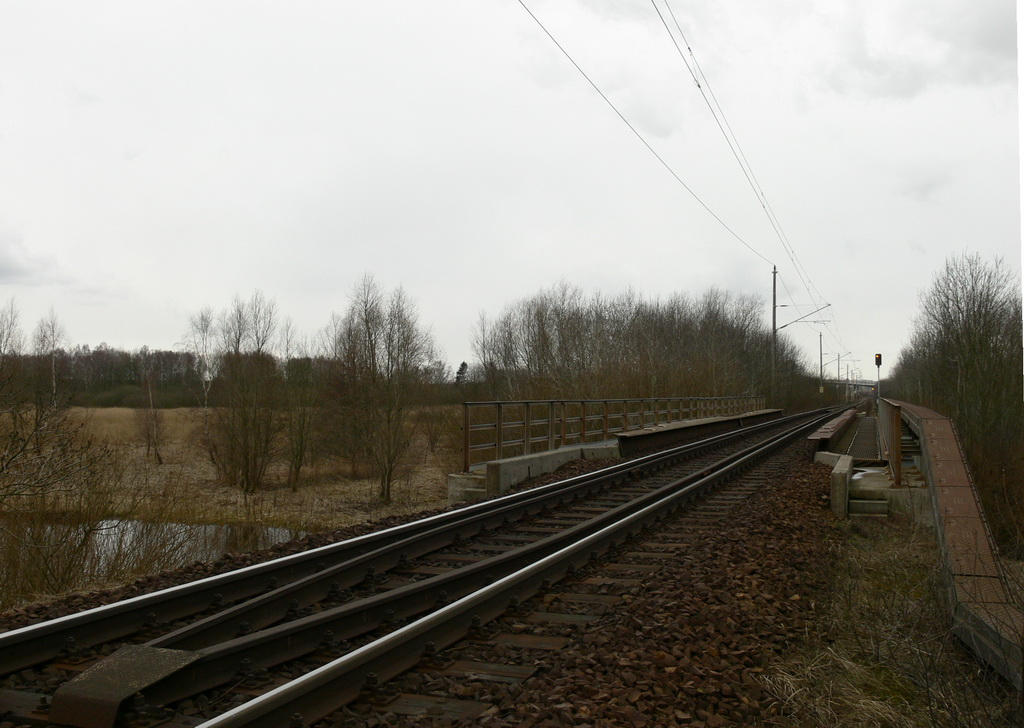
Bridge over the Recknitz (former border between Prussia and Mecklenburg)

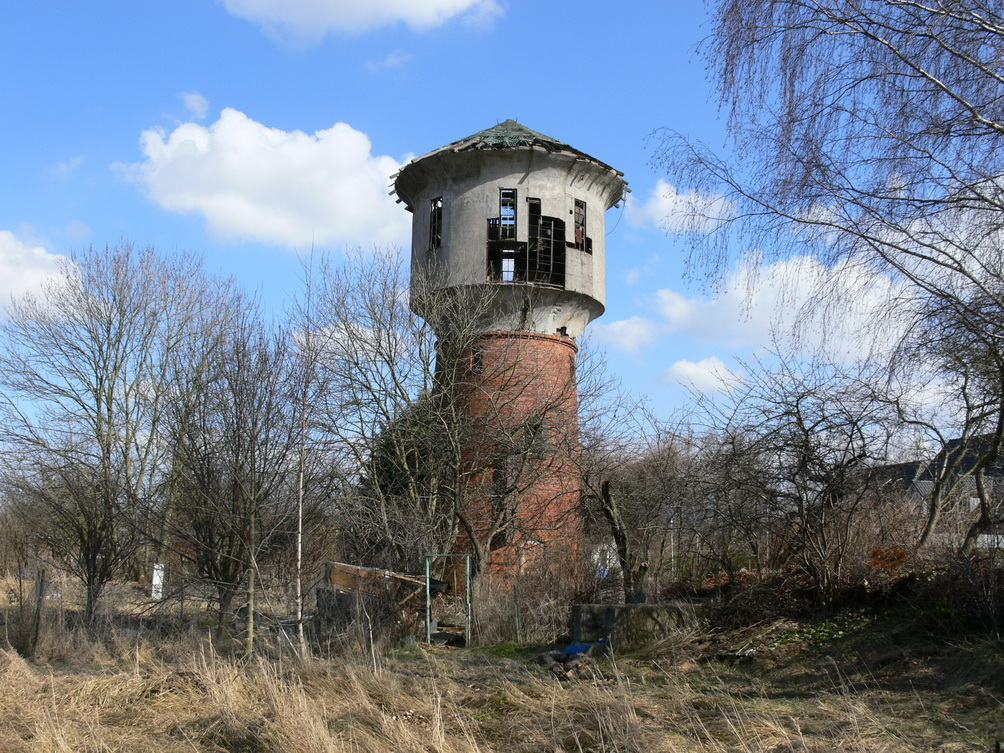
The water tower in Ribnitz-Damgarten West

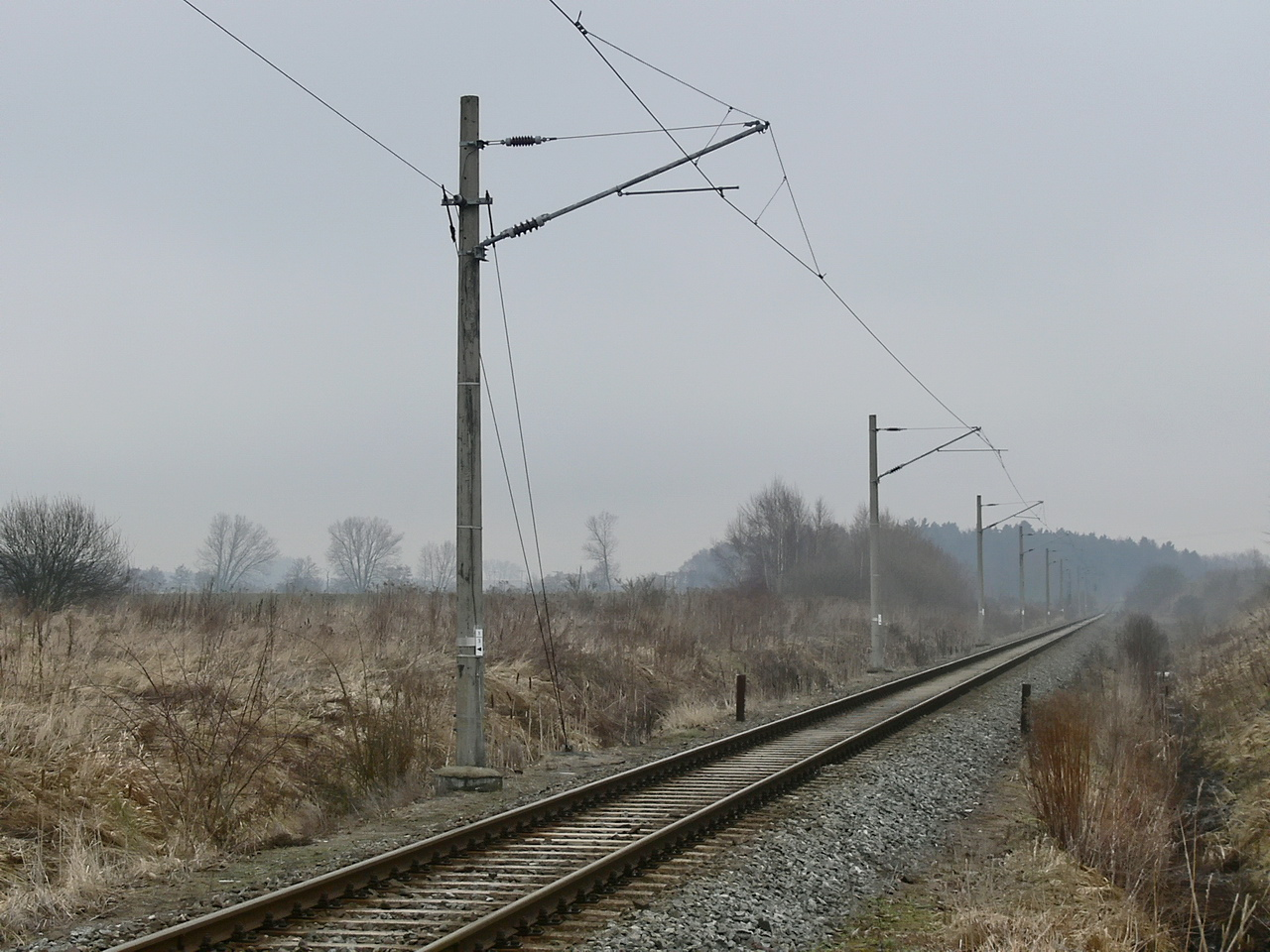
Electrification equipment in Poppendorf
