= Sassnitz station =

Railway station in Sassnitz, Germany

Sassnitz
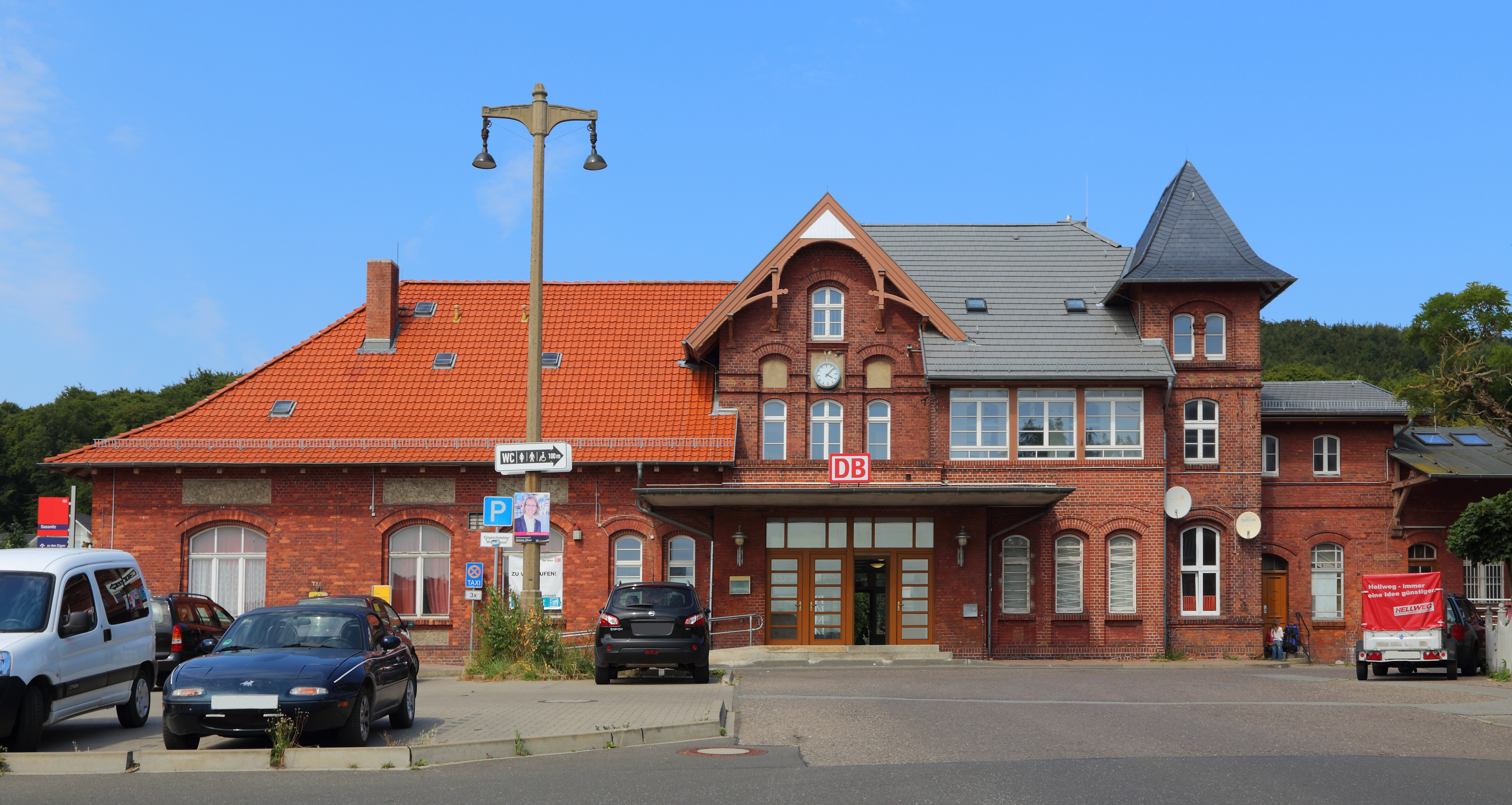
- Sassnitz railway station

General information
- Location: Sassnitz, MV, Germany
- Coordinates: 54°30′58″N 13°38′17″E
- Line: Stralsund–Sassnitz railway
- Platforms: 2
- Tracks: 3
- Train operators: ODEG

History
- Opened: 1 July 1891; 135 years ago
- Electrified: 27 May 1989; 37 years ago

Services
Preceding station	Ostdeutsche Eisenbahn	Following station
Lancken towards Rostock Hbf	RE 9	Terminus
Location

Sassnitz (German: Bahnhof Sassnitz) is a railway station in the town of Sassnitz, Mecklenburg-Vorpommern, Germany. The station lies on the Stralsund–Sassnitz railway and the train services are operated by Ostdeutsche Eisenbahn GmbH.

== Train services ==
The station is served by the following service(s):

- Regional services RE 9 Rostock – Velgast – Stralsund – Lietzow – Sassnitz

== History ==
The station was the destination of Vladimir Lenin's sealed train when he was provided passage through the German Empire by the Foreign Office and the Abteilung IIIb during the Russian Revolution, after which he boarded a ferry across the Baltic Sea for Trelleborg, Sweden, and then a train en route to Finland Station in Petrograd.

== Gallery ==
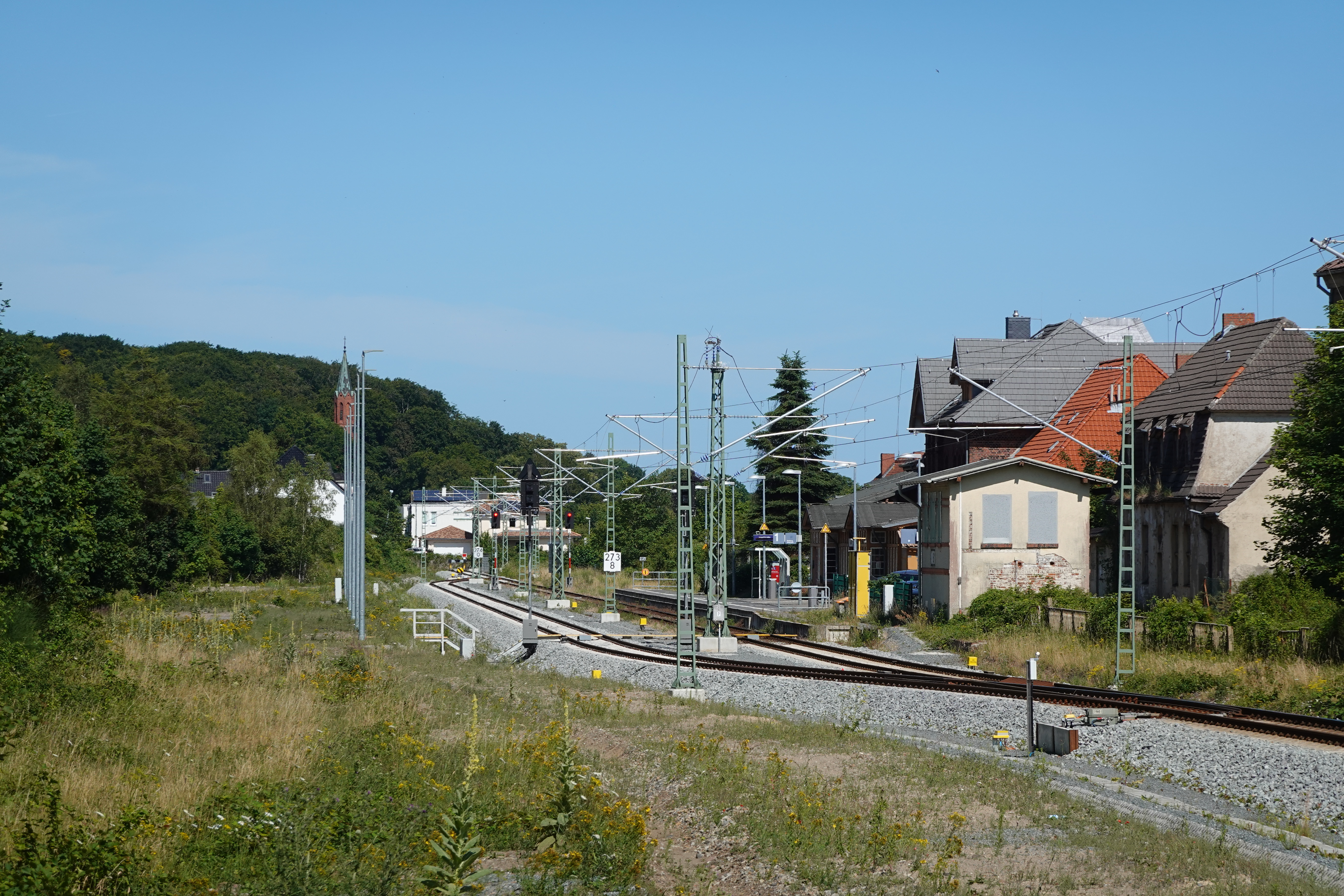
2023

ODEG Siemens Desiro HC as RE 9

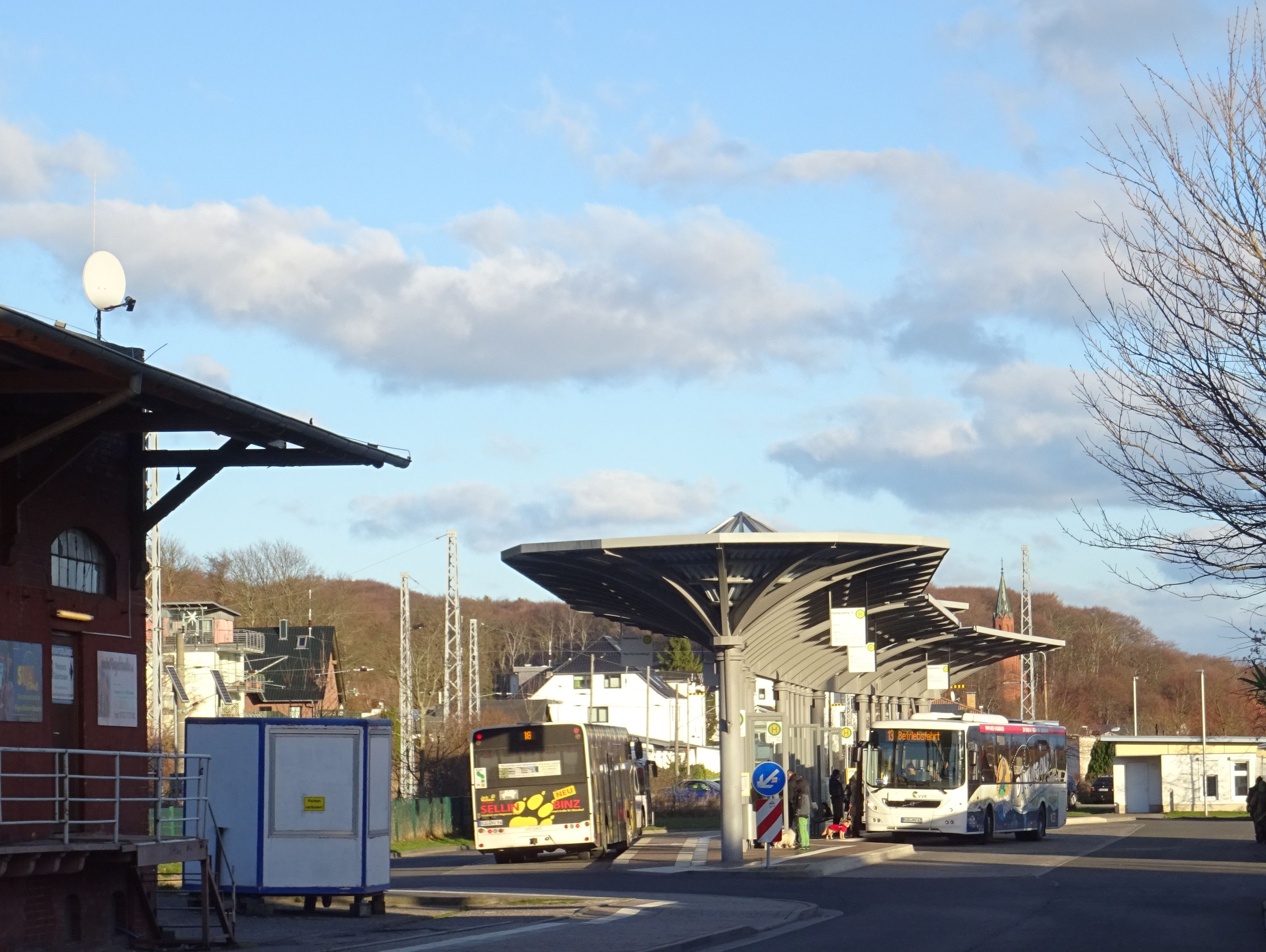
Sassnitz bus station
