= Lauterbach (Rügen) station =

Railway station in Germany

Lauterbach (Rügen)
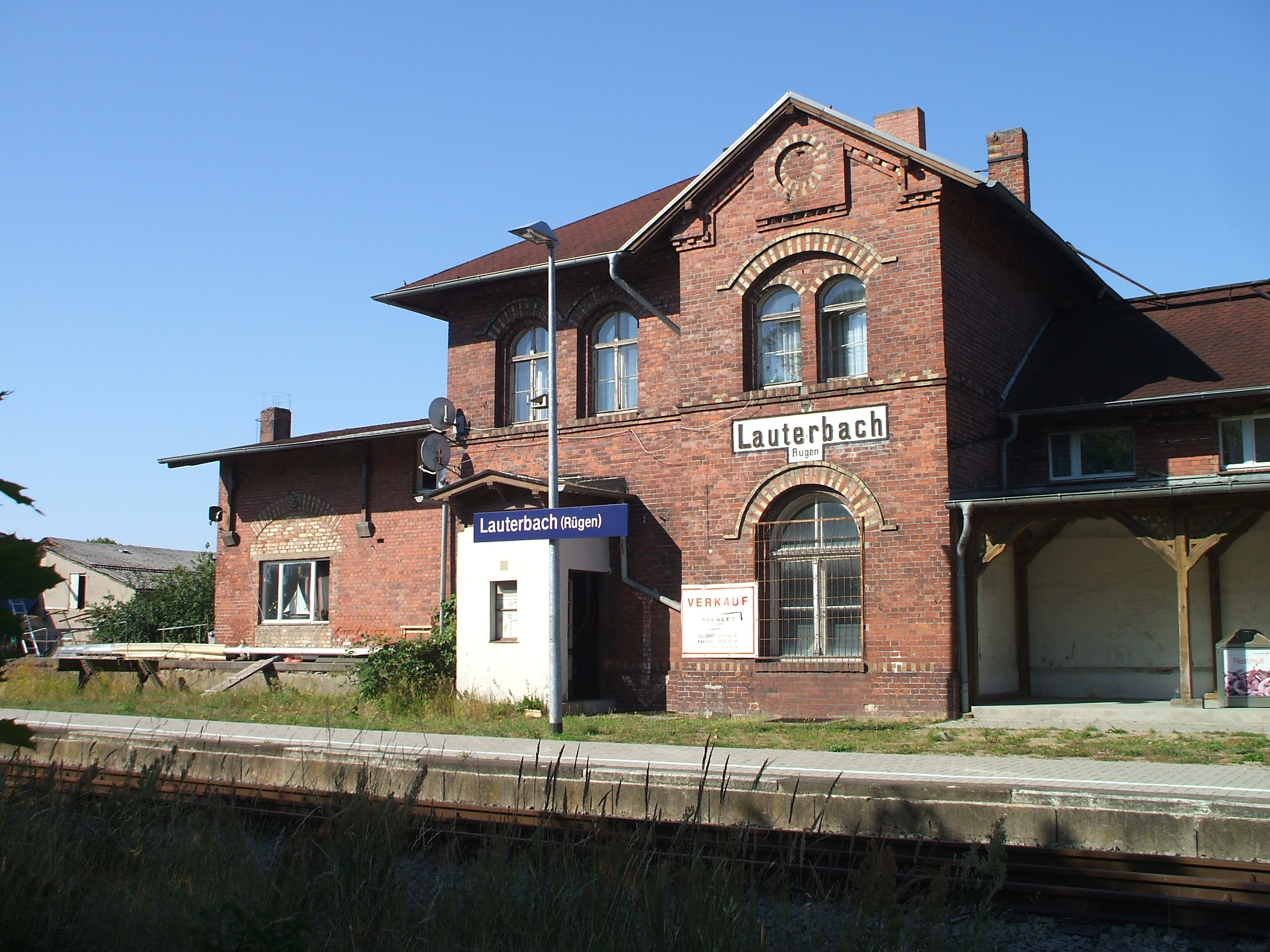
- Lauterbach railway station

General information
- Location: Lauterbach, Mecklenburg-Vorpommern, Germany
- Coordinates: 54°20′43″N 13°30′2″E
- Owner: DB Netz
- Operator: DB Station&Service
- Lines: Rügen narrow-gauge railway, Bergen auf Rügen–Lauterbach Mole railway
- Train operators: Pressnitztalbahn
- Connections: RB 26

Services
Preceding station	Pressnitztalbahn	Following station
Putbus towards Bergen auf Rügen	RB 26	Lauterbach Mole Terminus
Location
- Location within Mecklenburg-Vorpommern Location within Germany Location within Europe

Lauterbach (Rügen) (German: Haltepunkt Lauterbach (Rügen)) is a narrow and standard gauge train station in the town of Lauterbach, Mecklenburg-Vorpommern, Germany. The station lies on the Bergen auf Rügen–Lauterbach Mole railway and the Rügen narrow-gauge railway. The train services between Bergen auf Rügen and Lauterbach Mole are operated by Pressnitztalbahn.

== Train services ==
The station is served by the following service(s):

Line	Route	Frequency
RB 26	Bergen auf Rügen – Putbus – Lauterbach (Rügen) –Lauterbach Mole	Every two hours, hourly in the summer
