= Putbus station =

Railway station in Putbus, Germany

Putbus
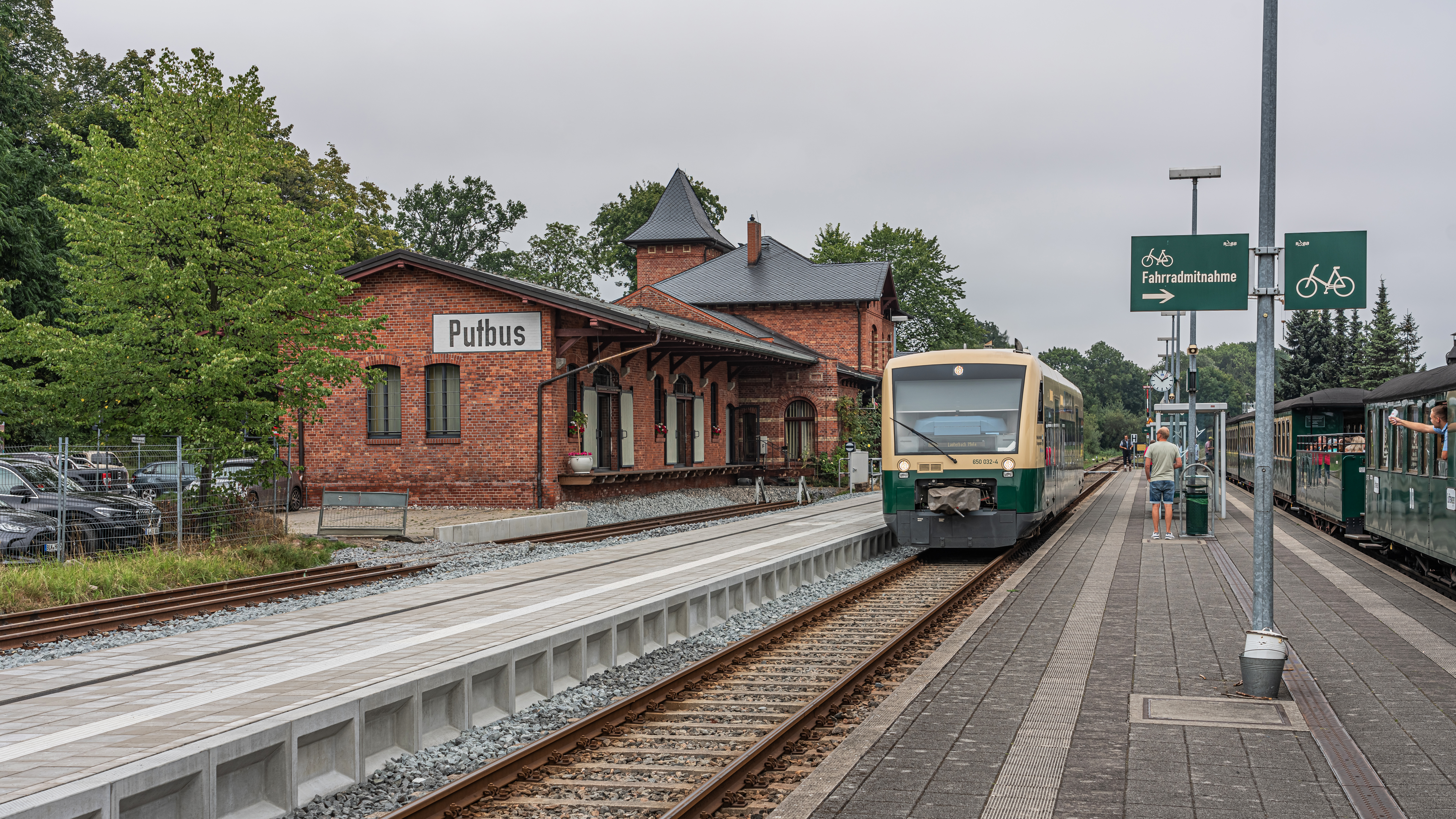
- Putbus railway station

General information
- Location: Putbus, MV, Germany
- Coordinates: 54°21′23″N 13°28′51″E
- Owner: DB Netz
- Operator: DB Station&Service
- Lines: Rügen narrow-gauge railway Bergen auf Rügen–Lauterbach Mole railway
- Train operators: Pressnitztalbahn; Rügensche Bäderbahn

History
- Opened: 15 August 1889; 137 years ago

Services
Preceding station	Pressnitztalbahn	Following station
Bergen auf Rügen Terminus	RB 26	Lauterbach (Rügen) towards Lauterbach Mole
Preceding station	Rügensche Bäderbahn	Following station
Beuchow towards Göhren (Rügen)	RB 32 "Rasender Roland"	Lauterbach Mole Terminus
Location

Putbus (German: Bahnhof Putbus) is a narrow and standard gauge train station in the town of Putbus, Mecklenburg-Vorpommern, Germany. The station lies on the Bergen auf Rügen–Lauterbach Mole railway and the Rügen narrow-gauge railway. The train services between Bergen auf Rügen and Lauterbach Mole are operated by Pressnitztalbahn. Rail service between Putbus and Göhren is operated by Rügensche Bäderbahn.

== Train services ==
The station is served by the following service(s):

Line	Route	Frequency
RB 26	Bergen auf Rügen – Putbus – Lauterbach Mole	Every two hours, hourly in the summer
RB 32	Göhren (Rügen) – Binz LB – Putbus – Lauterbach Mole	every two hours
