= Rambin (Rügen) station =

Railway stop in Rambin, Germany

Rambin (Rügen)

General information
- Location: Rambin, MV, Germany
- Coordinates: 54°21′13″N 13°12′27″E
- Line: Stralsund-Sassnitz railway
- Platforms: 2
- Tracks: 2
- Train operators: ODEG

History
- Opened: 1 July 1883; 143 years ago
- Electrified: 27 May 1989; 37 years ago

Services
Preceding station	Ostdeutsche Eisenbahn	Following station
Altefähr towards Rostock Hbf	RE 9	Samtens towards Sassnitz or Ostseebad Binz
Location
- Location within Mecklenburg-Vorpommern

Rambin (Rügen) station (German: Bahnhof Rambin (Rügen)) is a railway station in the town of Rambin, Mecklenburg-Vorpommern, Germany. The station lies on the Stralsund-Sassnitz railway and the train services are operated by Ostdeutsche Eisenbahn GmbH.

== Train services ==
The station is served by the following service(s):

- Regional services RE 9 Rostock - Velgast - Stralsund - Lietzow - Sassnitz/Binz
