= Stralsund Rügendamm station =

Railway station in Stralsund, Germany

Stralsund Rügendamm
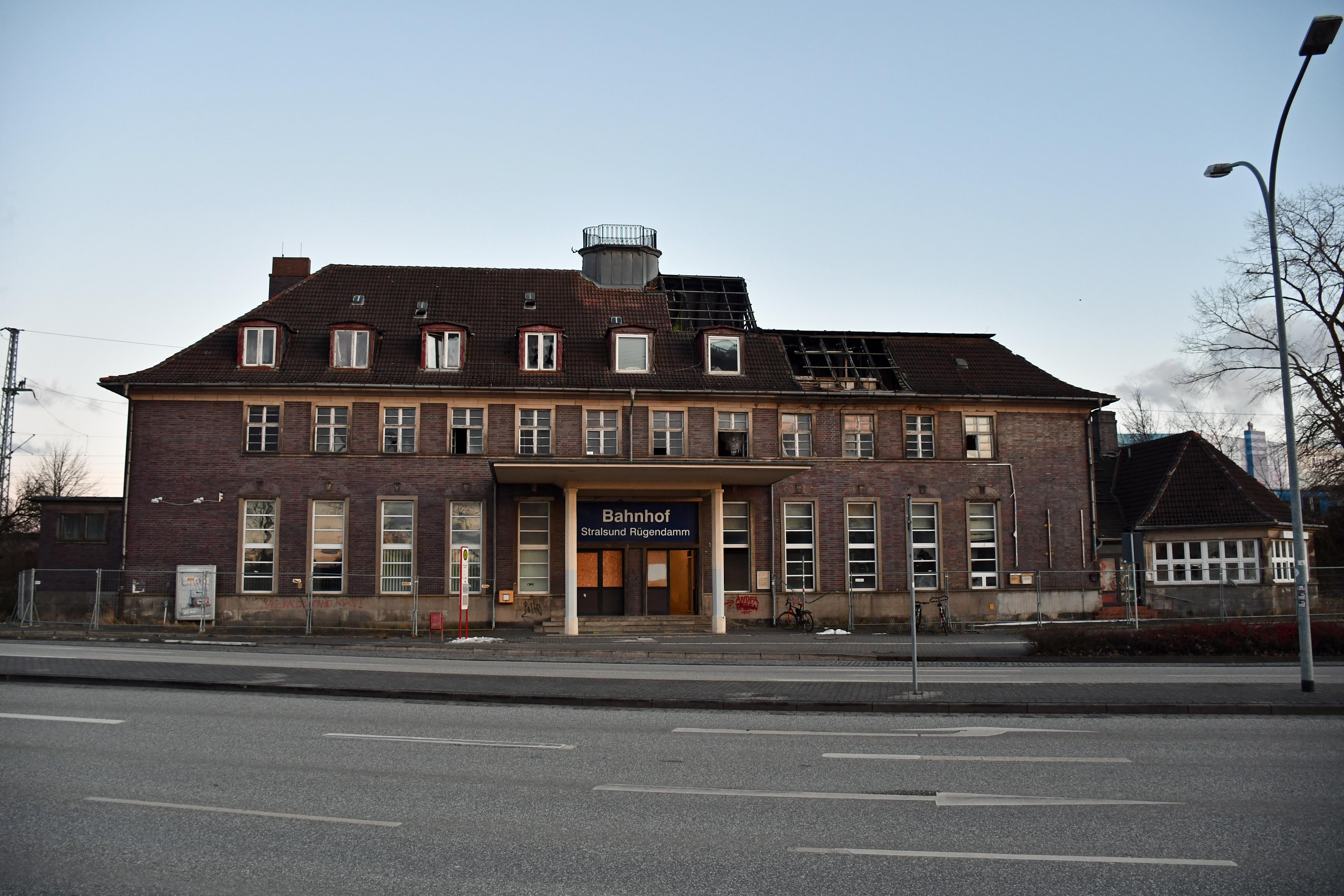
- 2023

General information
- Location: Stralsund, MV, Germany
- Coordinates: 54°18′18″N 13°06′26″E
- Line: Stralsund-Sassnitz railway
- Platforms: 2
- Tracks: 3
- Train operators: ODEG

History
- Opened: 5 October 1936; 89 years ago
- Electrified: 17 December 1988; 37 years ago

Services
Preceding station	Ostdeutsche Eisenbahn	Following station
Stralsund Hbf towards Rostock Hbf	RE 9	Altefähr towards Sassnitz or Ostseebad Binz
Location

Stralsund Rügendamm (German: Bahnhof Stralsund Rügendamm) is a railway station in the city of Stralsund, Mecklenburg-Vorpommern, Germany. The station lies on the Stralsund-Sassnitz railway and the train services are operated by Ostdeutsche Eisenbahn GmbH.

== Train services ==
The station is served by the following services:

- Regional services RE 9 Rostock - Velgast - Stralsund - Lietzow - Sassnitz/Binz
