= Samtens station =

Railway station in Samtens, Germany

Samtens
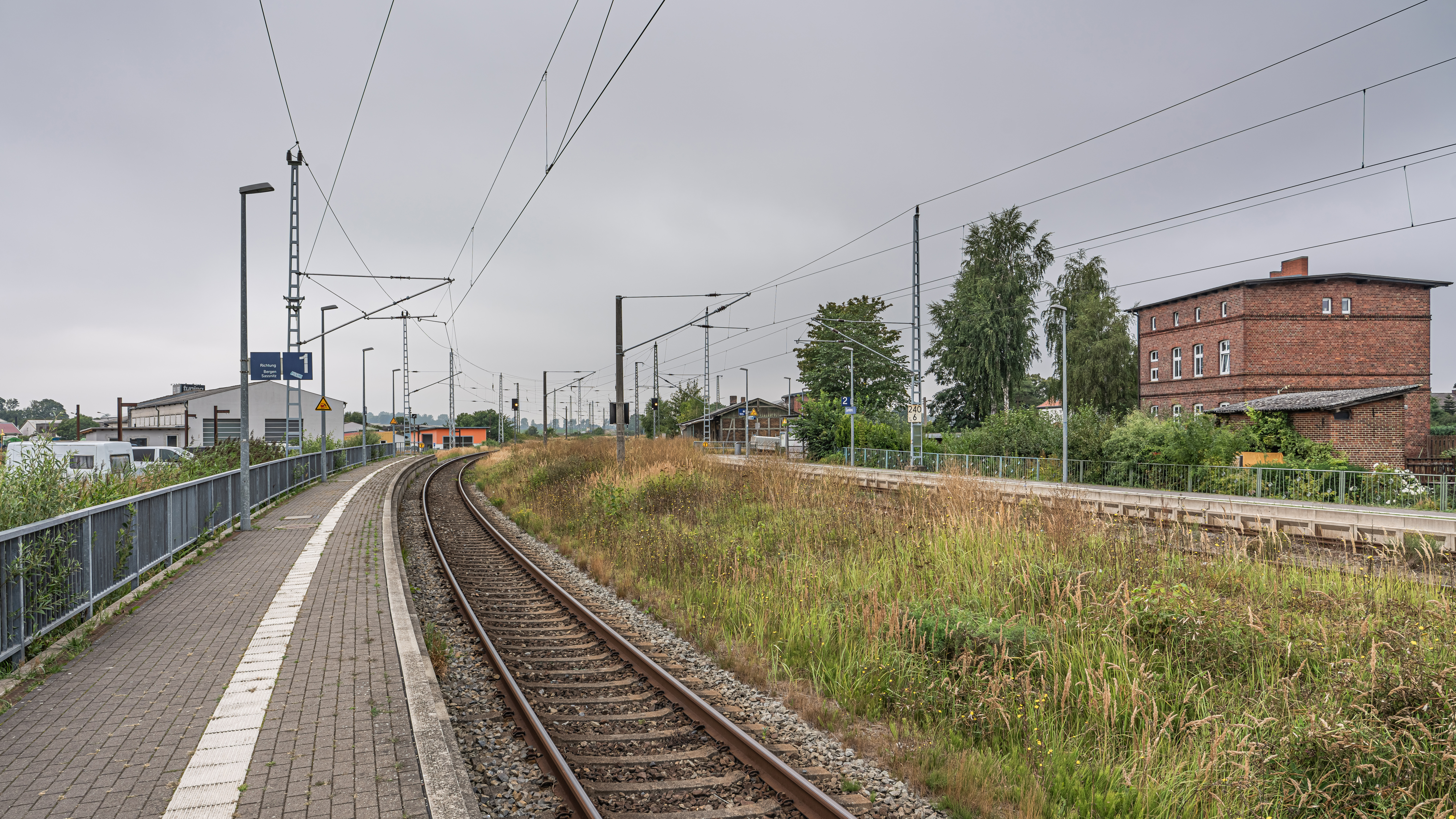
- 2022

General information
- Location: Stralsunder Straße 12; 18573 Samtens, MV; Germany
- Coordinates: 54°21′15″N 13°17′27″E
- Owner: Deutsche Bahn
- Operator: DB Station&Service
- Lines: Stralsund–Sassnitz railway (KBS 190)
- Platforms: 2 side platforms
- Tracks: 3
- Train operators: ODEG

Other information
- Station code: 5490
- DS100 code: WSAM
- IBNR: 8012835
- Category: 6
- Website: www.bahnhof.de

History
- Opened: 1 July 1883; 143 years ago
- Electrified: 27 May 1989; 37 years ago

Services
Preceding station	Ostdeutsche Eisenbahn	Following station
Rambin (Rügen) towards Rostock Hbf	RE 9	Teschenhagen towards Sassnitz or Ostseebad Binz
Location
- Location within Mecklenburg-Vorpommern

Samtens (German: Bahnhof Samtens) is a railway station in the town of Samtens, Mecklenburg-Vorpommern, Germany. The station lies on the Stralsund-Sassnitz railway and the train services are operated by Ostdeutsche Eisenbahn GmbH.

== Train services ==
The station is served by the following service(s):

- Regional services RE 9 Rostock - Velgast - Stralsund - Lietzow - Sassnitz/Binz
