= Altefähr station =

Railway station in Altefähr, Germany

Altefähr
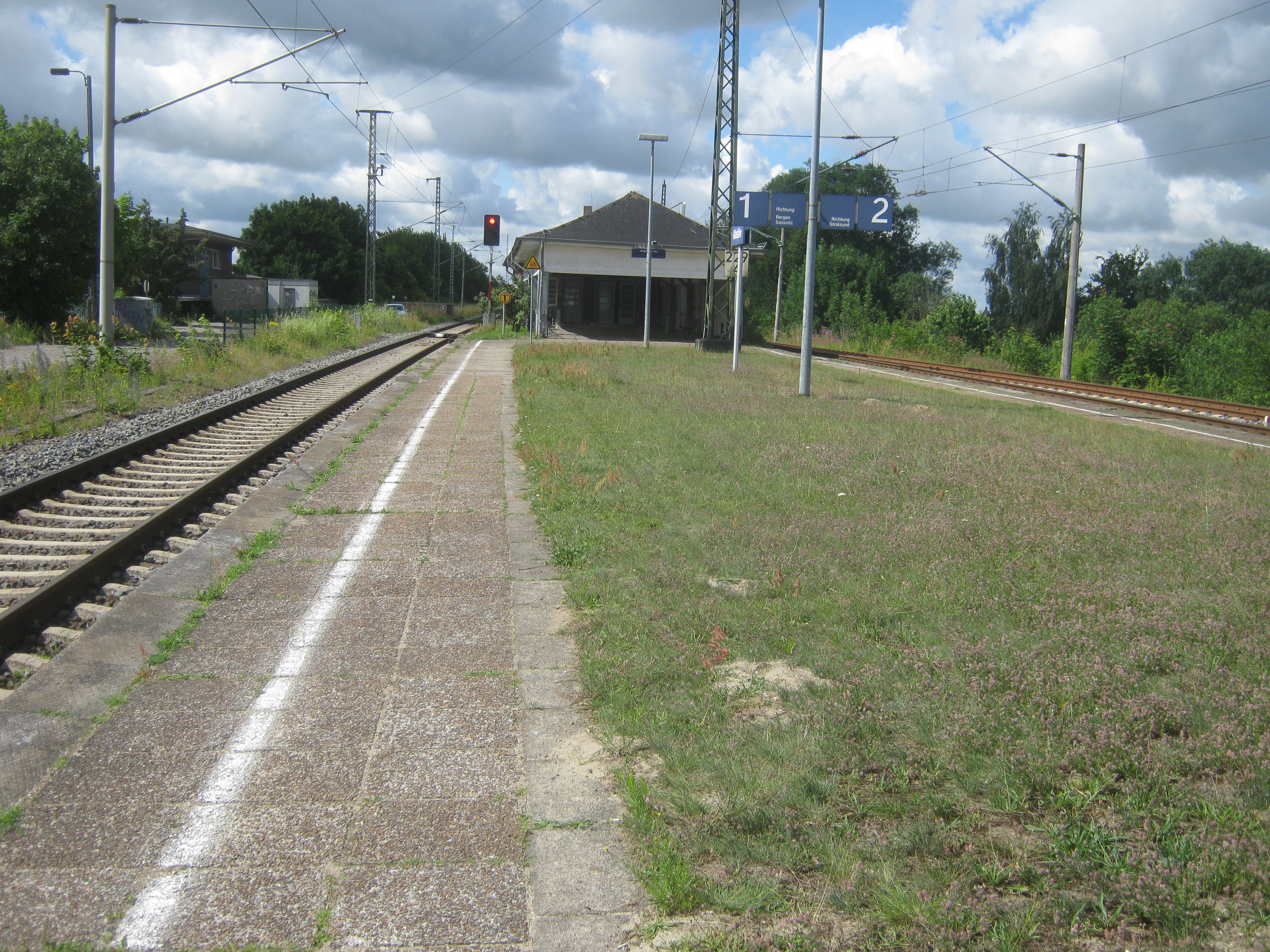
- 2022

General information
- Location: Altefähr, MV, Germany
- Coordinates: 54°19′23″N 13°08′30″E
- Line: Stralsund-Sassnitz railway
- Platforms: 2
- Tracks: 3
- Train operators: ODEG
- Connections: RE 9

History
- Opened: 1 July 1883; 143 years ago
- Electrified: 27 May 1989; 37 years ago

Services
Preceding station	Ostdeutsche Eisenbahn	Following station
Stralsund Rügendamm towards Rostock Hbf	RE 9	Rambin (Rügen) towards Sassnitz or Ostseebad Binz
Location

Altefähr (German: Bahnhof Altefähr) is a railway station in the town of Altefähr, Mecklenburg-Vorpommern, Germany. The station lies on the Stralsund-Sassnitz railway and the train services are operated by Ostdeutsche Eisenbahn GmbH.

== Train services ==
The station is served by the following service(s):

- Regional services RE 9 Rostock - Velgast - Stralsund - Lietzow - Sassnitz/Binz
