= Lancken station =

Railway station in Sassnitz, Germany

Lancken
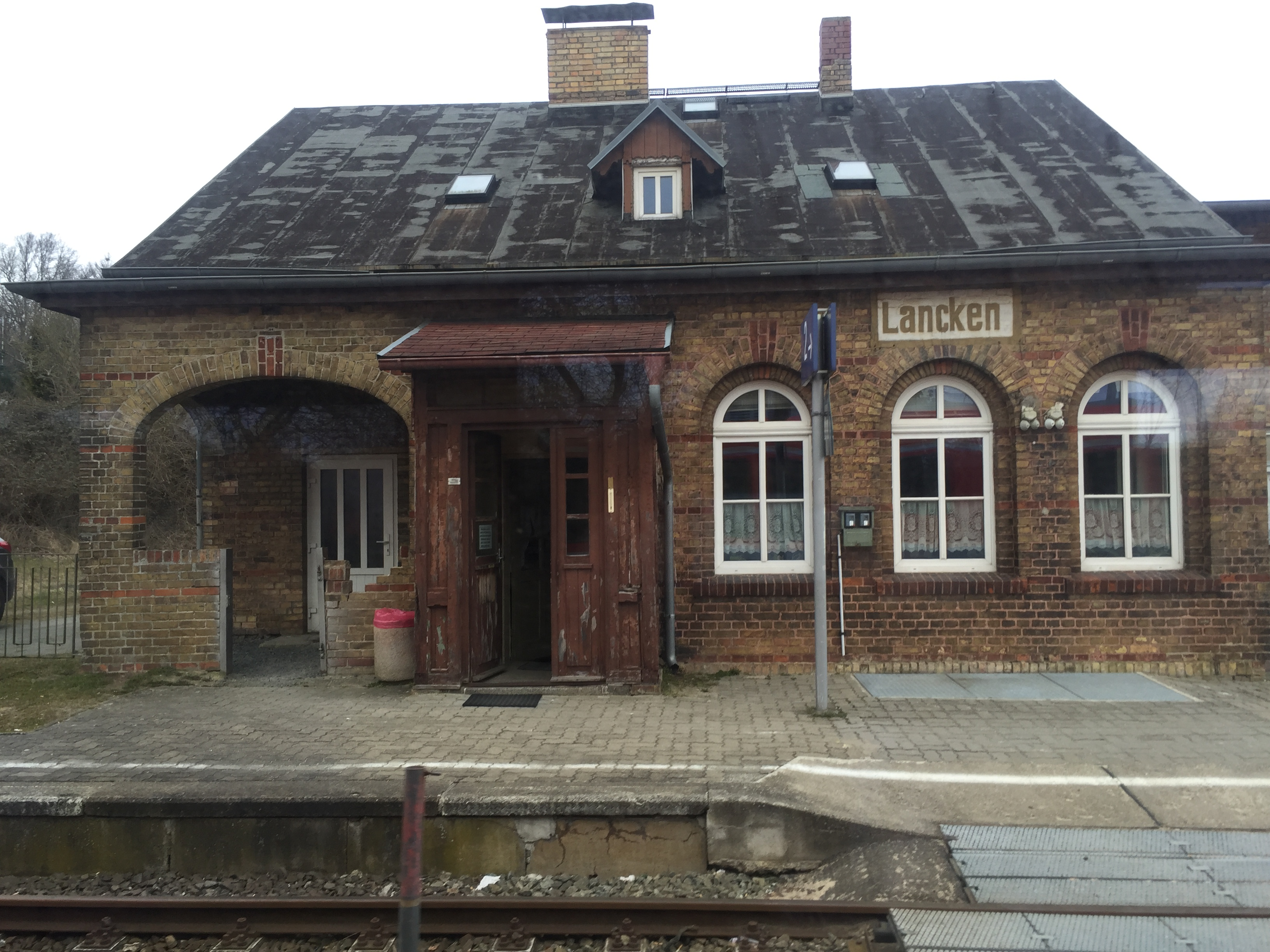
- Lancken station

General information
- Location: Sassnitz, MV, Germany
- Coordinates: 54°31′04″N 13°36′30″E
- Line: Stralsund-Sassnitz railway
- Platforms: 2
- Tracks: 2
- Train operators: ODEG
- Connections: RE 9

History
- Opened: 1 July 1891; 135 years ago
- Electrified: 27 May 1989; 37 years ago

Services
Preceding station	Ostdeutsche Eisenbahn	Following station
Sagard towards Rostock Hbf	RE 9	Sassnitz Terminus
Location
- Location within Mecklenburg-Vorpommern Location within Germany Location within Europe

Lancken (German: Bahnhof Lancken) is a railway station in the town of Sassnitz, Mecklenburg-Vorpommern, Germany. The station lies on the Stralsund-Sassnitz railway and the train services are operated by Ostdeutsche Eisenbahn GmbH.

== Train services ==
The station is served by the following service(s):

- Regional services RE 9 Rostock - Velgast - Stralsund - Lietzow - Sassnitz / Ostseebad Binz
