= Teschenhagen station =

Railway station in Sehlen, Germany

Teschenhagen

General information
- Location: Sehlen, MV, Germany
- Coordinates: 54°23′21″N 13°22′27″E
- Owner: Deutsche Bahn
- Operator: DB Station&Service
- Line: Stralsund-Sassnitz railway
- Platforms: 2
- Tracks: 2
- Train operators: ODEG

History
- Opened: 1 July 1883; 143 years ago
- Electrified: 27 May 1989; 37 years ago

Services
Preceding station	Ostdeutsche Eisenbahn	Following station
Samtens towards Rostock Hbf	RE 9	Bergen auf Rügen towards Sassnitz or Ostseebad Binz
Location
- Location within Mecklenburg-Vorpommern

Teschenhagen (German: Bahnhof Teschenhagen) is a railway station in the town of Sehlen, Mecklenburg-Vorpommern, Germany. The station lies on the Stralsund-Sassnitz railway and the train services are operated by Deutsche Bahn.

== Train services ==
The station is served by the following service(s):

- Regional services RE 9 Rostock - Velgast - Stralsund - Lietzow - Sassnitz/Binz
