= Bergen auf Rügen station =

Railway station in Bergen auf Rügen, Germany

Bergen auf Rügen
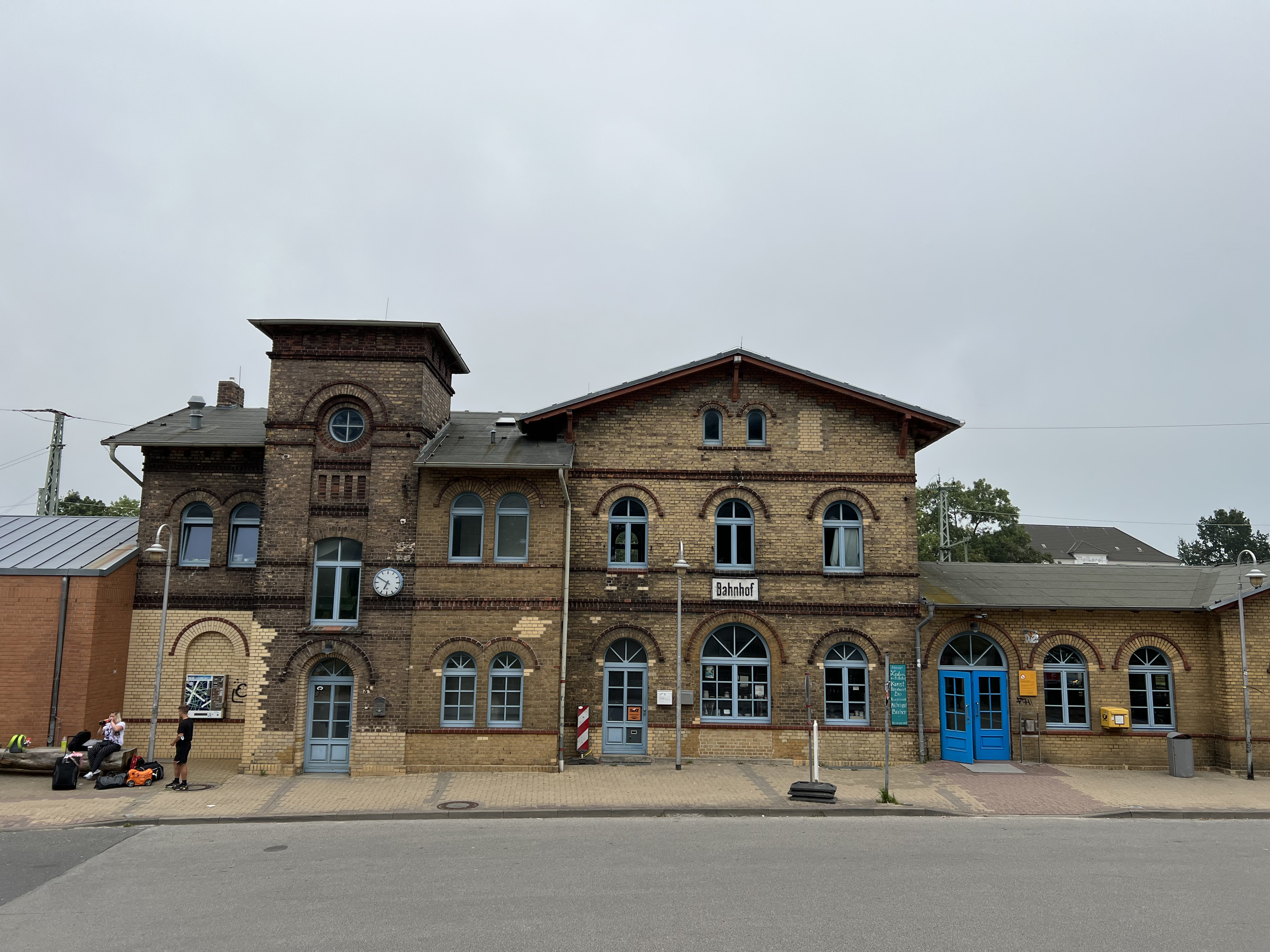
- Bergen auf Rügen railway station

General information
- Location: Bergen auf Rügen, Mecklenburg-Vorpommern, Germany
- Coordinates: 54°25′13″N 13°25′05″E
- Owner: Deutsche Bahn
- Operator: DB Station&Service
- Lines: Stralsund–Sassnitz; Bergen auf Rügen–Lauterbach Mole; Bergen auf Rügen–Altenkirchen (closed 1970)
- Platforms: 4
- Tracks: 4
- Train operators: ODEG, DB Fernverkehr, Pressnitztalbahn, Hanseatische Eisenbahn

Other information
- Website: www.bahnhof.de

History
- Opened: 1 July 1883; 143 years ago
- Electrified: 27 May 1989; 37 years ago

Services
Preceding station	DB Fernverkehr	Following station
Stralsund Hbf towards Saarbrücken Hbf	ICE 15	Ostseebad Binz Terminus
Stralsund Hbf towards Hamburg-Altona	ICE 33	Ostseebad Binz Terminus
Preceding station	Ostdeutsche Eisenbahn	Following station
Teschenhagen towards Rostock Hbf	RE 9	Lietzow (Rügen) towards Sassnitz or Ostseebad Binz
Preceding station	Hanseatische Eisenbahn	Following station
Terminus	RE 27	Sassnitz Fährhafen Terminus
Preceding station	Pressnitztalbahn	Following station
Terminus	RB 26	Putbus towards Lauterbach Mole
Location

Bergen auf Rügen (German: Bahnhof Bergen auf Rügen) is a railway station in the town of Bergen auf Rügen, Mecklenburg-Vorpommern, Germany. The station lies on the Stralsund-Sassnitz railway and Bergen auf Rügen–Lauterbach Mole railway and was opened in 1883. The train services are operated by Deutsche Bahn Fernverkehr, Ostdeutsche Eisenbahn GmbH, Pressnitztalbahn and Hanseatische Eisenbahn. The narrow gauge line to Altenkirchen was closed in 1970.

== Rail services ==
In the 2026 timetable the following lines stop at the station:

=== Long distance ===
Line	Route	Frequency
ICE 15	Binz – Bergen auf Rügen – Stralsund – Berlin – Halle – Erfurt – Frankfurt – Darmstadt – Mannheim – Kaiserslautern – Saarbrücken	Every two hours
ICE 33	Binz – Bergen auf Rügen – Stralsund – Rostock – Schwerin – Hamburg – Hamburg-Altona	Every two hours

=== Regional services ===
Line	Route	Interval	Frequency
RE 9	Ostseebad Binz – Prora –	Lietzow (Rügen) – Bergen auf Rügen – Samtens – Stralsund Hbf – Velgast – Ribnitz-Damgarten West – Rostock)	Every two hours to Binz and Sassnitz, every hour to Stralsund, every two hours to Rostock
RE 9	Sassnitz – Lancken – Sagard –	Lietzow (Rügen) – Bergen auf Rügen – Samtens – Stralsund Hbf – Velgast – Ribnitz-Damgarten West – Rostock)	Every two hours to Binz and Sassnitz, every hour to Stralsund, every two hours to Rostock
RE 27	Bergen auf Rügen – Sassnitz Fährhafen		Seasonal individual trains
RB 26	Bergen auf Rügen – Putbus – Lauterbach Mole		Every two hours, hourly in the summer

== Gallery ==
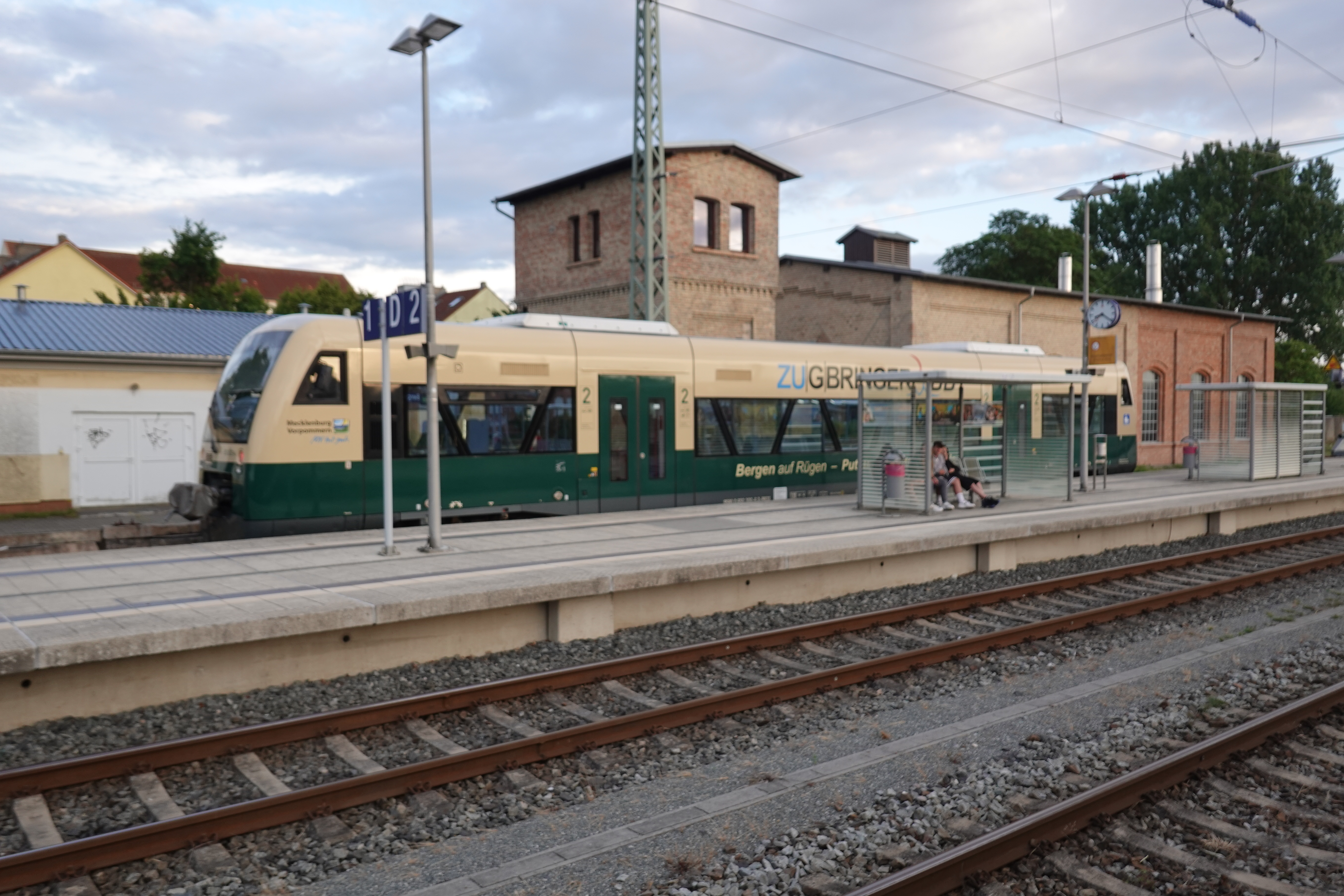
Pressnitztalbahn Regio-Shuttle towards Lauterbach Mole

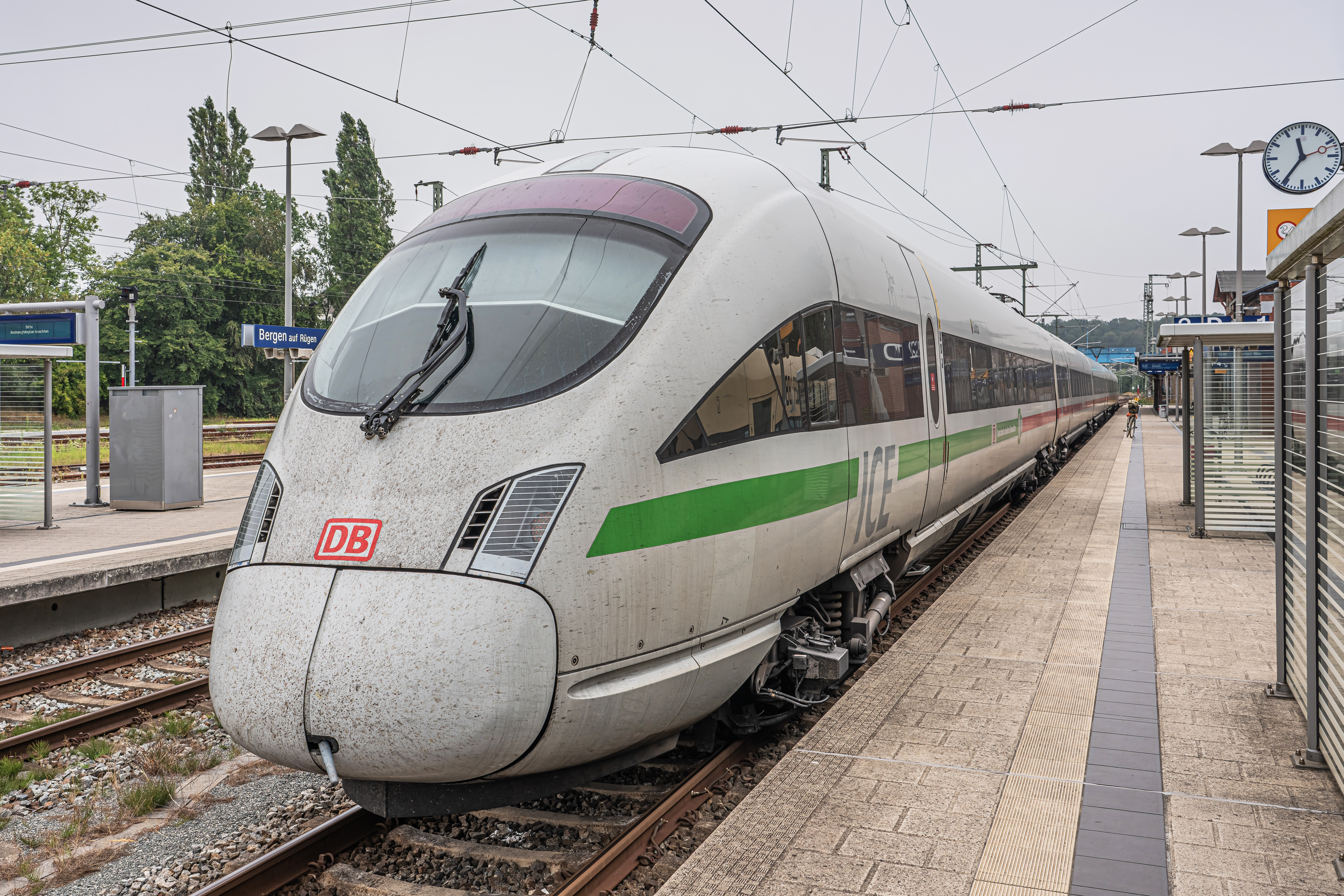
ICE at Bergen

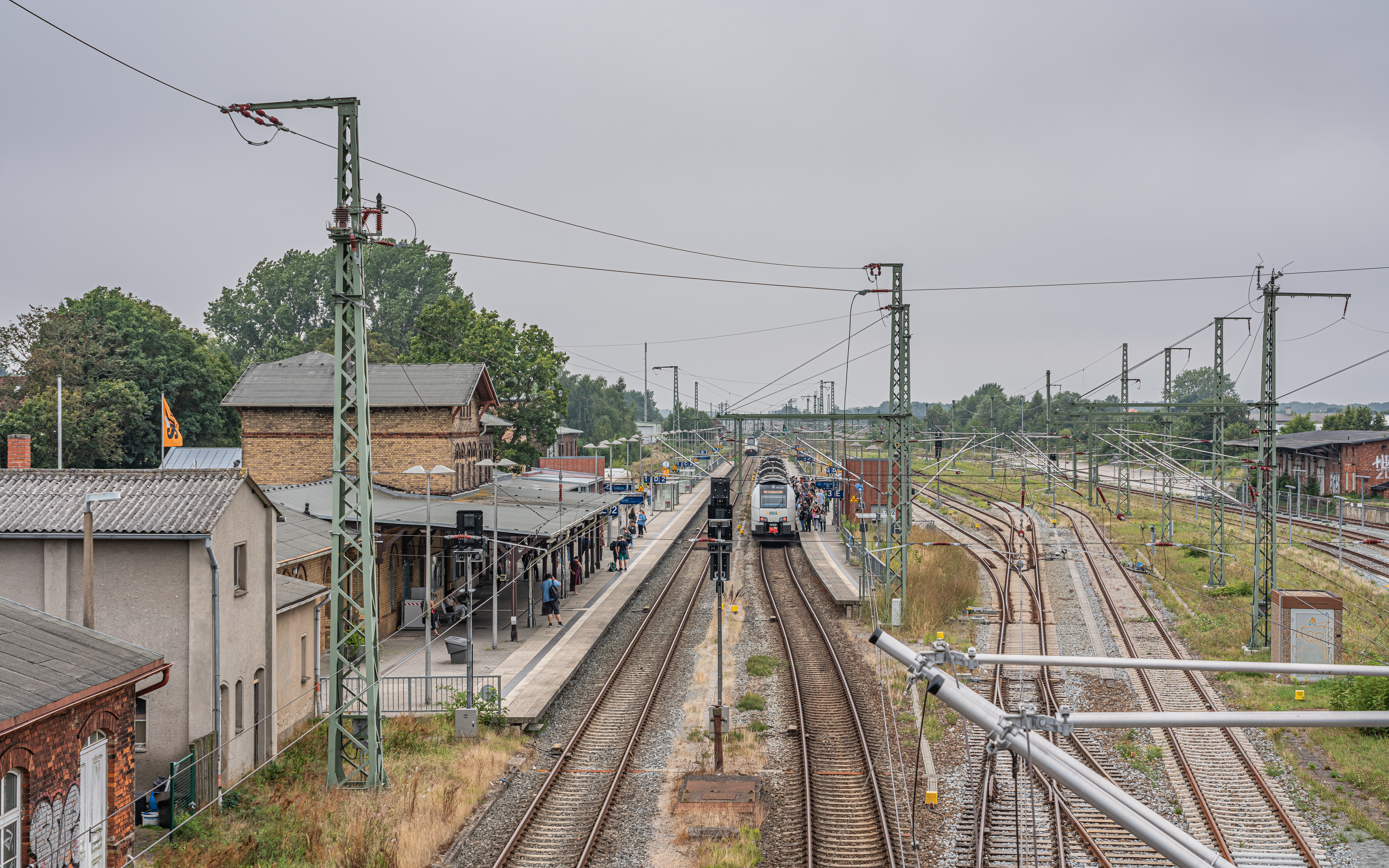
2022

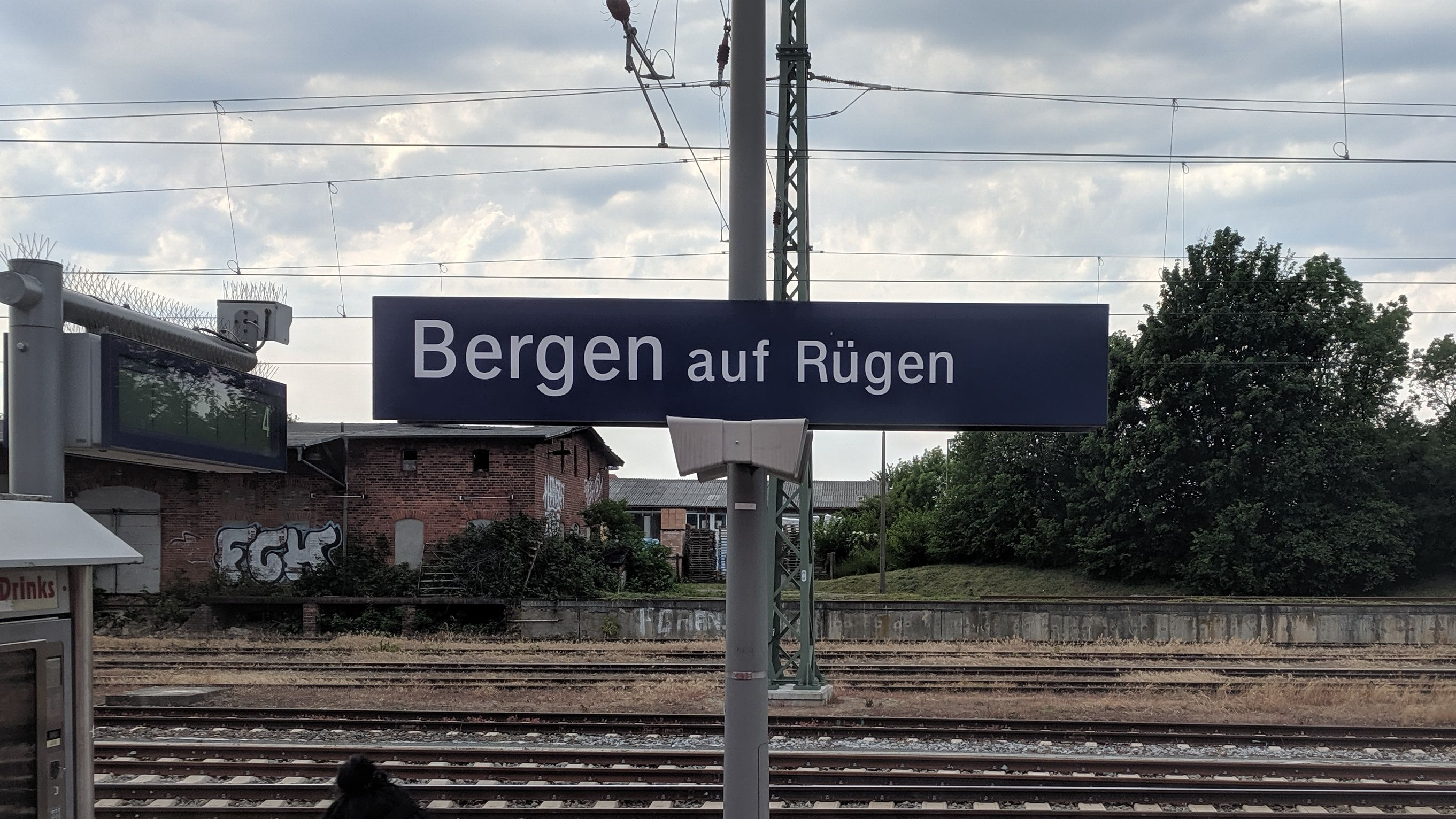
Station sign

== See also ==
- Rail transport in Germany
- Railway stations in Germany
