= Lauterbach Mole station =

Railway station in Germany

Lauterbach Mole
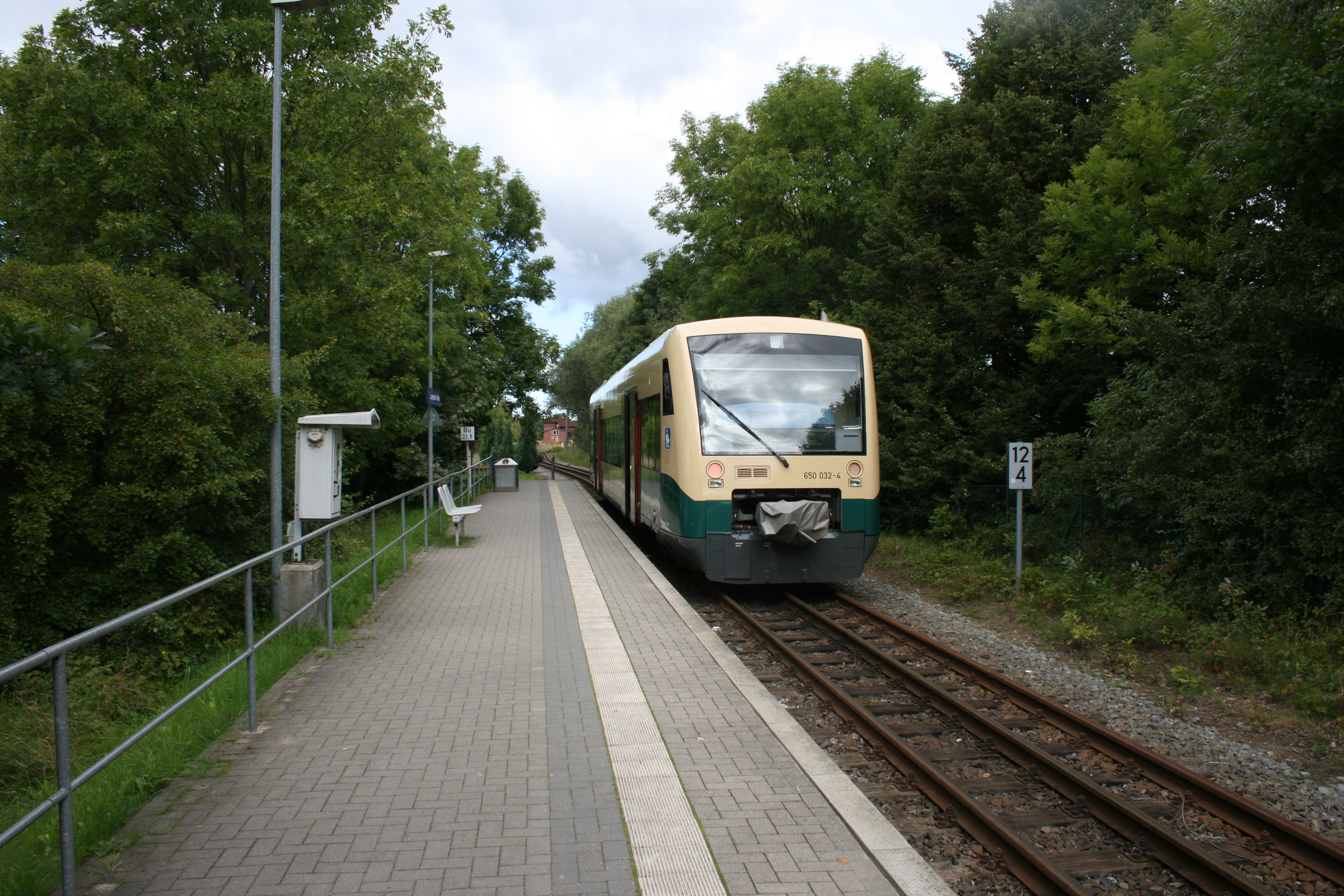
- Lauterbach Mole railway station

General information
- Location: Lauterbach, Mecklenburg-Vorpommern, Germany
- Coordinates: 54°20′30″N 13°30′12″E
- Owner: DB Netz
- Operator: DB Station&Service
- Lines: Rügen narrow-gauge railway, Bergen auf Rügen–Lauterbach Mole railway
- Train operators: Pressnitztalbahn, Rügensche Bäderbahn
- Connections: RB 26RB 32

Services
Preceding station	Pressnitztalbahn	Following station
Lauterbach (Rügen) towards Bergen auf Rügen	RB 26	Terminus
Preceding station	Rügensche Bäderbahn	Following station
Lauterbach (Rügen) towards Göhren (Rügen)	RB 32	Terminus
Location
- Location within Mecklenburg-Vorpommern Location within Germany Location within Europe

Lauterbach Mole (German: Haltepunkt Lauterbach Mole) is a narrow and standard gauge train station in the town of Lauterbach, Mecklenburg-Vorpommern, Germany. The station lies on the Bergen auf Rügen–Lauterbach Mole railway and the Rügen narrow-gauge railway. The train services between Bergen auf Rügen and Lauterbach Mole are operated by Pressnitztalbahn. Rail service between Lauterbach (Mole) and Göhren is operated by Rügensche Bäderbahn.

== Train services ==
The station is served by the following service(s):

Line	Route	Frequency
RB 26	Bergen auf Rügen – Putbus – Lauterbach Mole	Every two hours, hourly in the summer
RB 32	Göhren (Rügen) – Binz LB – Putbus – Lauterbach Mole	every two hours
