= Strelasund Crossing =

Two bridges in Mecklenburg-Vorpommern, Germany

Rügen Bridge Rügenbrücke
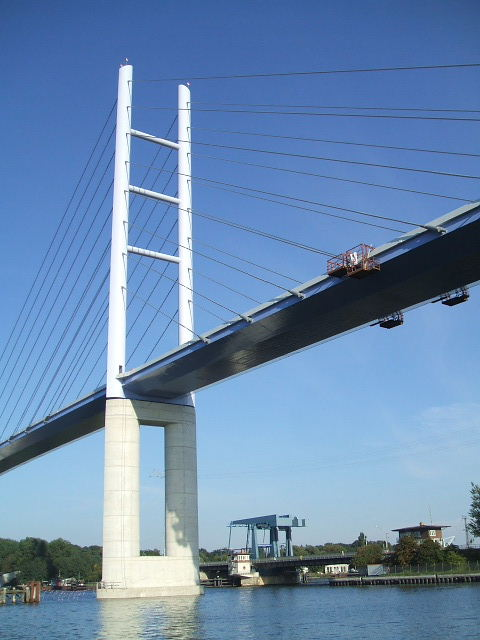
- New Rügen Bridge and the old drawbridge
- Coordinates: 54°18′30″N 13°06′41″E
- Carries: Bundesstraße 96 E22
- Crosses: Strelasund
- Locale: Stralsund and Rügen Island, Germany
- Official name: 2. Strelasundquerung

Characteristics
- Design: cable-stayed bridge
- Material: Steel pre-stressed concrete
- Total length: 2,831 metres (9,288 ft)
- Width: 3 traffic lanes
- Height: 127.75 metres (419.1 ft)
- Longest span: 198 metres (650 ft)
- Piers in water: 19
- Clearance below: 42 metres (138 ft)

History
- Designer: André Keipke
- Construction start: 31 August 2004
- Construction end: 20 October 2007
- Opened: 22 October 2007

Statistics
- Daily traffic: 23,000
- Toll: None

Location
- Interactive map of Rügen Bridge; Rügenbrücke

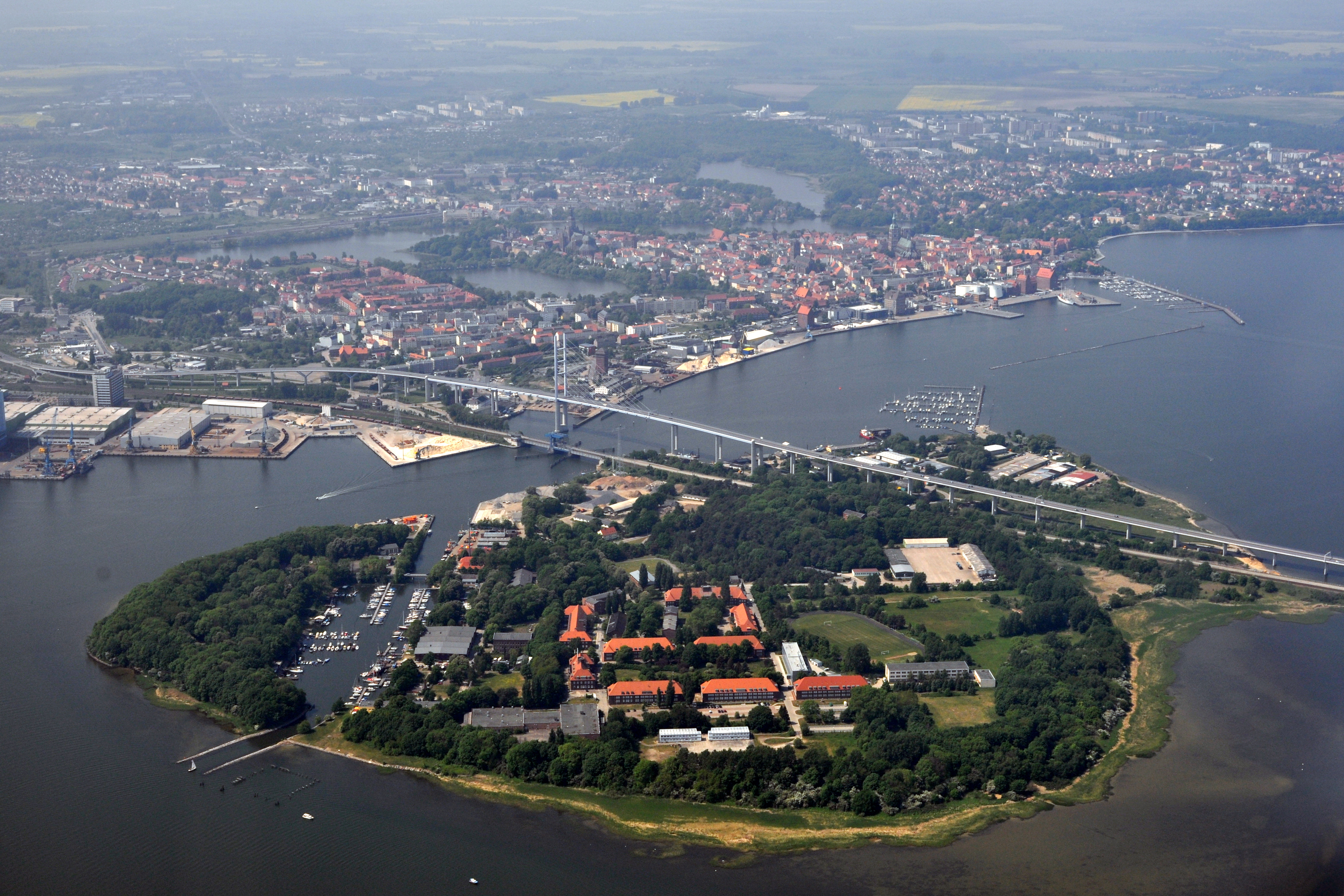
The two bridges over the Strelasund, connecting Stralsund and Rugia Island

Strelasund Crossing is the two links to the German island of Rügen (Rugia) over the Strelasund to the West Pomeranian mainland near Stralsund: the Rügen Bridge or Rugia Bridge (German: Rügenbrücke) and the Rugia Causeway (German: Rügendamm).

Ferry services between Stralsund and Altefähr and the Glewitz Ferry ("Glewitzer Fähre") between Stahlbrode and Zudar are also available to cross the Strelasund sound.

The Rügendamm was the first fixed crossing over the sound of Strelasund, for both the old Bundesstraße 96, the Stralsund–Sassnitz railway and a combined footpath and cycle path. It was completed in 1936/1937.

Rügenbrücke is the name of the three-lane viaduct completed in 2007 exclusively for motor traffic, between the village of Altefähr on Rugia Island and the Hanseatic and world heritage town of Stralsund; as part of the concept to turn the B96 and European route E22 into a ring road. Both bridges are operated in parallel. The Rugia Bridge has an overall length of 2,831 metres (9,288 ft), which makes it one of Central Europe's largest bridges.

== Bridge crossings ==
=== Rügen Bridge ===
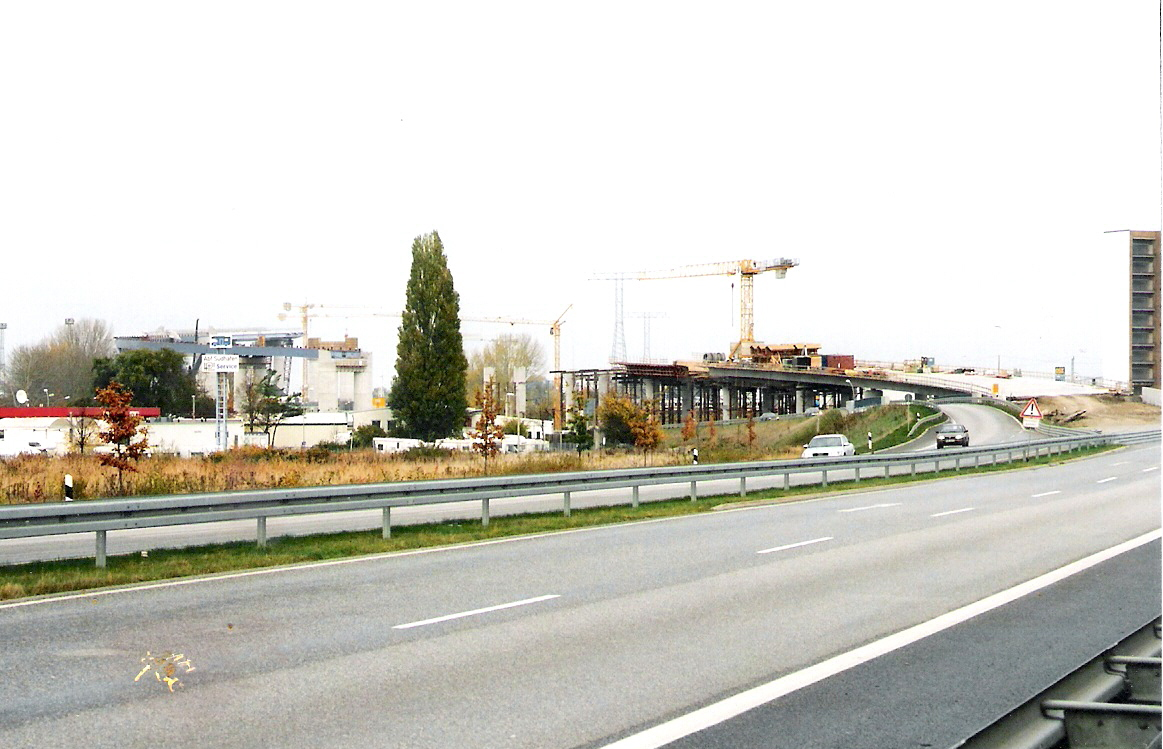
Approach on the Stralsund side, approach bridges (5 November 2005)

Rügen Bridge (German: Rügenbrücke) is a cable-stayed bridge made of pre-stressed concrete that spans the Strelasund between the city of Stralsund and the island of Rügen. The bridge was built to replace the aging Rügendamm, which will remain in service to provide a rail link and serve local traffic to Dänholm island. The bridge has three lanes, the centre one being demand-activated. The main element of the 4,100 metre crossing is the 2,831 metre-long main span over the Strelasund.

The crossing comprises a total of seven sections, five of which are bridge structures:

- Embankment on the mainland side in Stralsund,
- Two approach bridges in Stralsund,
- Viaduct over the Ziegelgraben,
- Dänholm approach bridge,
- Strelasund approach bridge,
- Strelasund Bridge, and
- Embankment on the island of Rügen.

==== Southern ramp ====
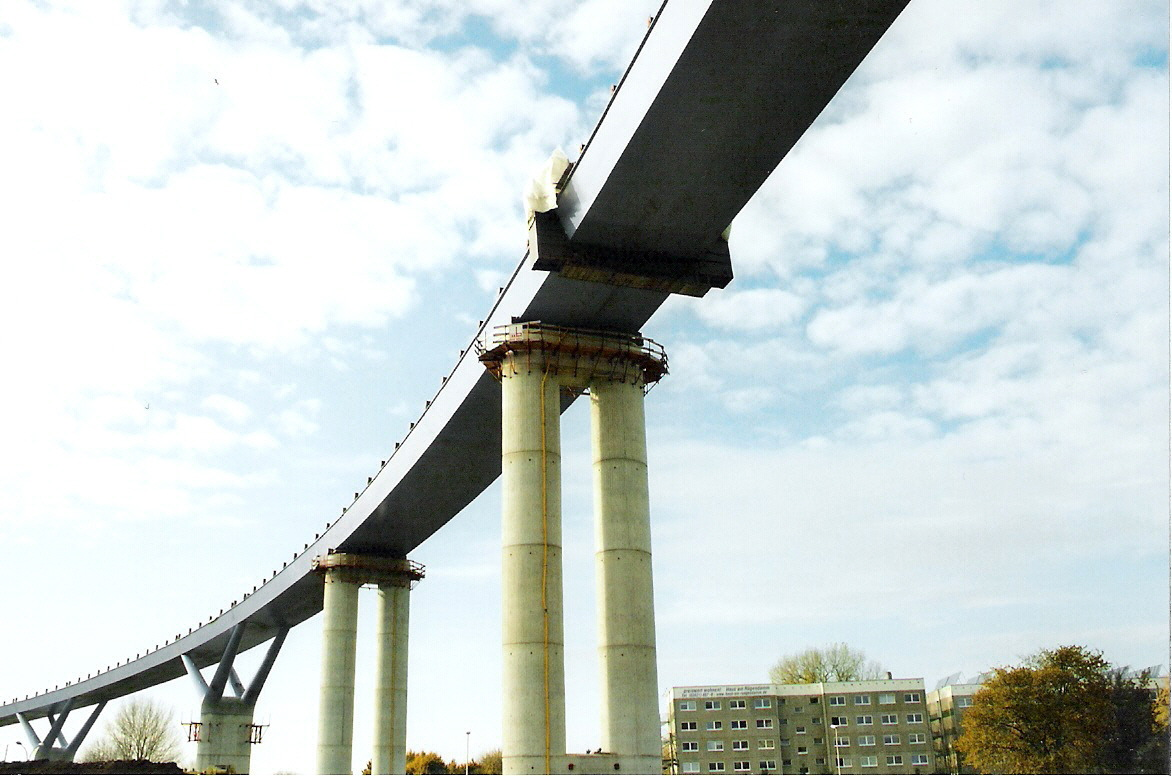
The two Y-column pairs, 12 November 2005

The southern bridge ramp begins behind its junction with the Stralsund ring road (the B 96 federal road) and consists, of an 85.53-metre-long embankment structure, measured to the abutment of the first approach bridge. Beyond it are the two Stralsund approach bridges (Vorlandbrücken Stralsund) with gradients of up to 4%. The first, structure BW 1.1, is 327.5-metre-long bridge made of pre-stressed concrete with ten sections and a twin prestressed beam slab girder as the superstructure. BW 1.2 is a 317.0-metre-long bridge with six sections and a single-cell steel composite superstructure that was manufactured by the steelworks in Neumarkt-Sengenthal. An architectural feature is the B 96 approach road section with its two pairs of Y-supports, which enable the large column spacing of 72 metres at constant height. The railings of the approach bridges have 0.70-metre-high inside walls with laminated safety glass panels as wind deflectors and spray shields. The structures are founded on driven concrete piles cast in-situ.

==== New Ziegelgraben Bridge (viaduct) ====
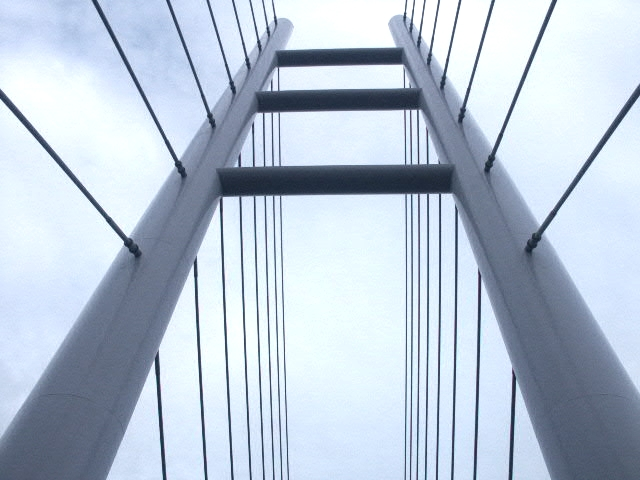
View of the pylon pillars

The new Ziegelgraben Bridge (BW 2), designed as a viaduct, crosses the waterway of the Ziegelgraben, an arm of the Strelasund which separates Stralsund from the island of Dänholm. It has a length of 583.30 metres. The two main section, 126 metres (on the mainland side) and 198 metres (on the Dänholm side), are designed as a cable-stayed bridge with a three-cell steel box girder frame, which was made in the Neumarkt-Sengenthal steelworks. The bridge enables shipping to pass with a clearance of 42 metres.

The 128-metre-high, light blue pylon is divided into two parts: an approximately 40-metre-high base of concrete and an upper part of steel. The superstructure is separated from the base by bridge bearings. The base of the main pillar consists of 40 bored pilings with a 1.5 metre diameter. 32 harp-shaped, diagonally tensioned steel cables suspend the two main openings from the drop-shaped pylon.

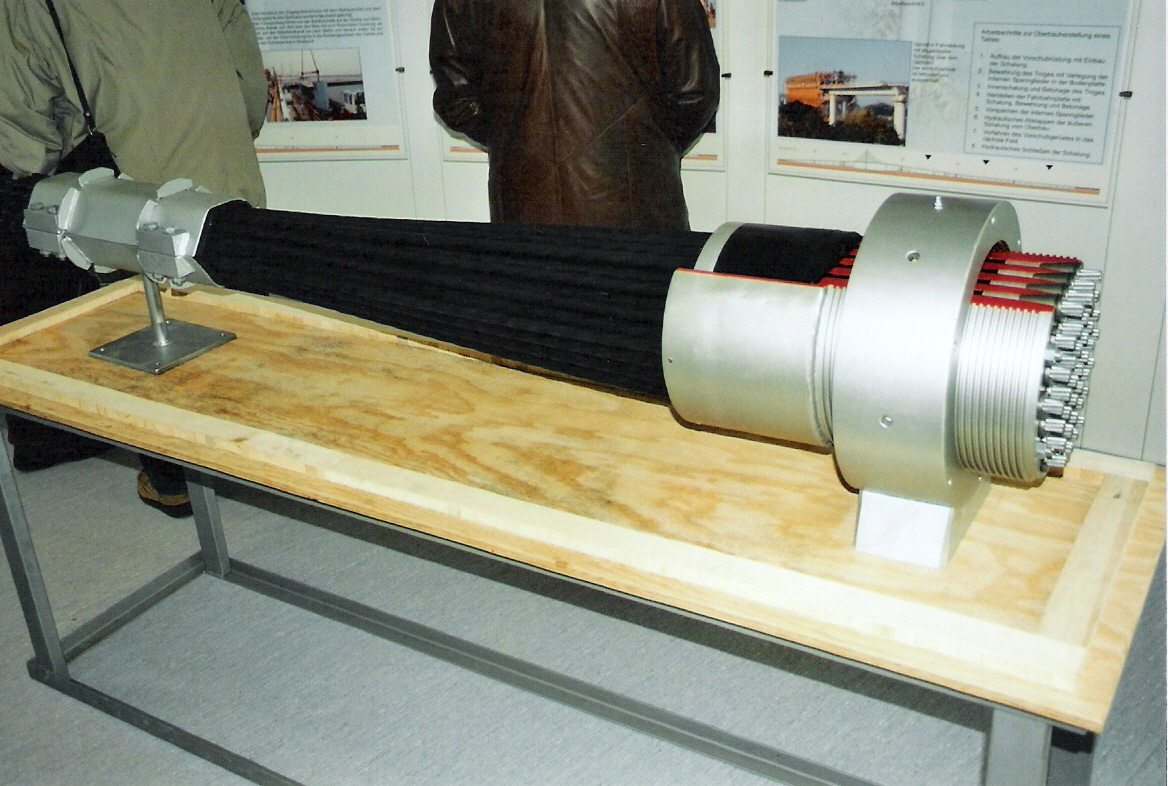
Model of the steel cables

Rügen Bridge is fitted with suspension cables using a system unique in Germany, whereby they are triple-protected from corrosion: first the cables are galvanized, secondly they are covered with a coating of polyethylene, and finally with special wax as well. The cables were tested for a year at the Technical University of Munich, and finally approved by the Federal Ministry. The steel cables, with a total mass of up to 135 tons, consist of 34 individual strands that are bundled into a sheath to form a single cable with a diameter of 180 mm. They are rated for a tension of 4000 kN.

The railings of the new Ziegelgraben Bridge have a 1.5-metre-high (4.9 ft) inside lining with laminated safety glass as a wind deflector.

==== Northern bridge ramp ====
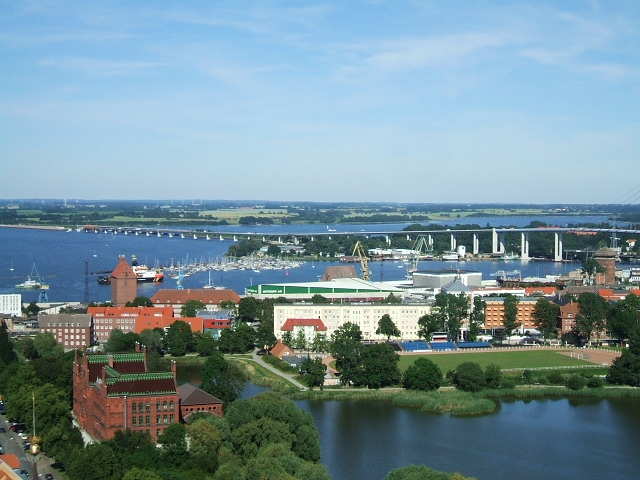
Bridge over the Dänholm and Strelasund Bridge

The northern bridge ramp consists of three bridges, an embankment and a road section.

After the main bridge comes the Dänholm approach bridge (Vorlandbrücke Dänholm, BW 3), a 532.3-metre-long approach bridge structure, and the Strelasund approach bridge (Vorlandbrücke Strelasund, BW 4), with a length of 532.2 metres. Both structures have a 10-section, single-cell pre-stressed box girder superstructure and are anchored on bored pilings made of cast-in-place concrete. The railings of the Dänholm bridge are designed with a 0.70-metre-high (2.3 ft) internal lining of laminated safety glass as a wind deflector.

The final bridge structure is the 539.0-metre-long Strelasund Bridge (Strelasundbrücke, BW 5). This also has a single-cell prestressed concrete box girder superstructure. The last section of the Strelasund Crossing runs down another embankment. The length of this embankment is 455.95 metres, beyond that is a further 732.0 metres of roadway. Filled with 225,000 m^{3} of earth, the ramp sides have sheet pilings covering an area of 20,690 m^{2}, that runs up to the junction of the crossing with the transport hub of Altefähr. In this area there is a cycle path underpass.

=== Rügen Causeway ===
Rügen Causeway (Rügendamm, literally "Rügen Embankment") is the name of the original road connecting Rügen Island with the City of Stralsund on the mainland of the German state of Mecklenburg-Vorpommern. The road was built in the 1930s and opened in October 1936. The Rügendamm consists of two parts:

- Strelasund Bridge is a 1.8-kilometre-long (1.1 mi) bridge and causeway spanning the Strelasund and
- Ziegelgraben Bridge, a bascule bridge over the Ziegelgraben stream. This bridge opens several times a day to allow for the passage of large ships. Prior to the construction of the new Rügen Bridge, the drawbridge bridge was a source of major traffic congestion.

The Rügendamm provides the only road and rail access to Dänholm island.

== Ferry crossings ==
Between Stralsund and Altefähr there is also a ferry crossing operated by small passenger ships, which are used exclusively for foot passengers. It is operated by the Weiße Flotte.

== History ==
For thousands of years the Strelasund has separated the island of Rügen from what is today the West Pomeranian mainland. For at least seven millennia, people have settled on the island, establishing their holy sites here too, such as the Swantevit site at Cape Arkona. From the 12th century, Christianity spread to the island. The pagan sites fell into ruins or were slighted. These sites had previously been a destination for many pilgrims also from the mainland. They used boats to cross the sound; boats were also used for trade between the island and the mainland.

=== Old ferry ===
The strait was crossed at many different places, because the island lies within sight of the mainland coast along a long stretch. The shortest distance, however, was between the sites of the modern town of Stralsund and the village of Altefähr. This point was also very conveniently situated because of the intermediate island of Stralow (later called Dänholm). From here a regular ferry service evolved; around 1000 or 1100 herring was already being traded here and, during excavations on the island of Rügen, even Arabic coins were found.

The two ferry stages developed into larger settlements following the arrival of Christianity brought by the Danes. In particular, the ferry village of Stralow (stral means 'arrow' in Middle Low German and Slavic) developed rapidly. At the beginning of the 13th century more and more settlers came, inter alia from Westphalia. Their settlement was encouraged by the princes of Rügen and in 1234 Prince Wizlaw I gave town rights to Stralow. The ferry service to Alte Fähre ('Old Ferry') as the place on Rügen was named was becoming increasingly important; more and more goods and wares were traded over the crossing. In 1293 Stralsund became a member of the Hanseatic League and the movement of goods between the island of Rügen and the mainland grew in importance and scope.

=== Dänholm Ferry ===
A ferry between Dänholm and the mainland site of Stralsund was predominantly used by the military. It was established in mid-July 1935, after the completion of the Ziegelgraben Bridge for road traffic.

=== 2nd Strelasund Crossing ===
In 2004, construction of a new bridge, called the 2nd Strelasund Crossing (2. Strelasundquerung), commenced. German Chancellor Angela Merkel opened the new bridge on 20 October 2007. The name of this new bridge is the Rügen Bridge (Rügenbrücke). The Rügen Bridge is a one-tower suspension bridge that has nineteen piers holding it up from the water. The connection has a length of 4.1 kilometres (2.5 mi), the new bridge is 2,831 metres (9,288 ft) long and the centre pylon is 128 metres (420 ft) tall. The new bridge crosses but does not provide access to Dänholm island.

== Literature ==
- Horst Auerbach (Red.): Von den Postseglern nach Schweden zur Hochbrücke über den Strelasund. Schriftenreihe des Marinemuseums Dänholm, H. 9, Förderverein des Marinemuseums Dänholm e. V., Stralsund, 2004.
- Herbert Ewe: Geschichte der Hansestadt Stralsund. H. Böhlaus Nachf., Weimar 1984, 1985.
- Herbert Ewe: Stralsund. Carl Hinstorff, Rostock 1965, 1987, ISBN 3-356-00082-9
- Herbert Ewe, Harry Hardenberg, Günter Ewald: Stralsund. Die Stadt am Meer. Carl Hinstorff, Rostock, 1997, ISBN 3-356-00738-6
- Karl Kleinhanß: Die 2. Strelasundquerung – "Das neue Tor nach Rügen". Tagungsband für Stahlbautag 2004
- Martin Steinkühler: Bau der 2. Strelasundquerung. In:Tiefbau, Vol. 4, 118. Jahrgang, April 2006, p. 186-191 (pdf file; 5.11 MB)
- Wolfgang Rudolph: Stralsund. Die Stadt am Meer. edited by Käthe Miethe. Carl Hinstorff, Rostock, 1955.
