= Strelasund =

Coordinates: 54°17′24″N 13°07′12″E

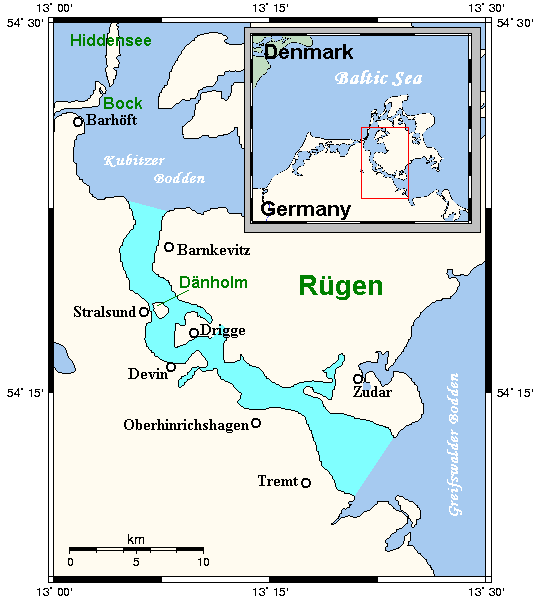
The Strelasund (in cyan)

The Strelasund or Strela Sound is a sound of the Baltic Sea which separates Rügen from the German mainland. It is crossed by a bridge called the Strelasund Crossing from Stralsund. It runs northwest to southeast from a small shallow bay just north of Stralsund called the Kubitzer Bodden through to another such bay, the Greifswalder Bodden in the southeast. The sound is nowhere much more than 3 km wide, reaching its greatest width towards its southeast end. It is roughly 25 km long.

The only island of any size in the Strelasund is Dänholm just off Stralsund, which carries part of the Rügendamm across the sound.

On the Rügen side, the shore is in many places steep, although this is punctuated by lower shorelines with reed beds in some places. On the mainland side, however, the shores are overridingly flat.

The Strelasund has been the site of two battles. The first in 1362 and the second in 1369 both pitted Danish king Valdemar IV against the Hanseatic fleet. Differences between the two parties were settled by the Treaty of Stralsund in 1370.

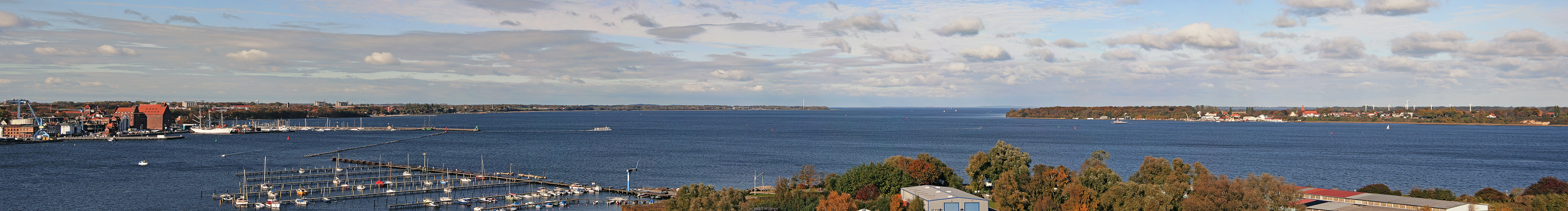
Panorama of the sound from the Rügen Bridge looking towards Parow
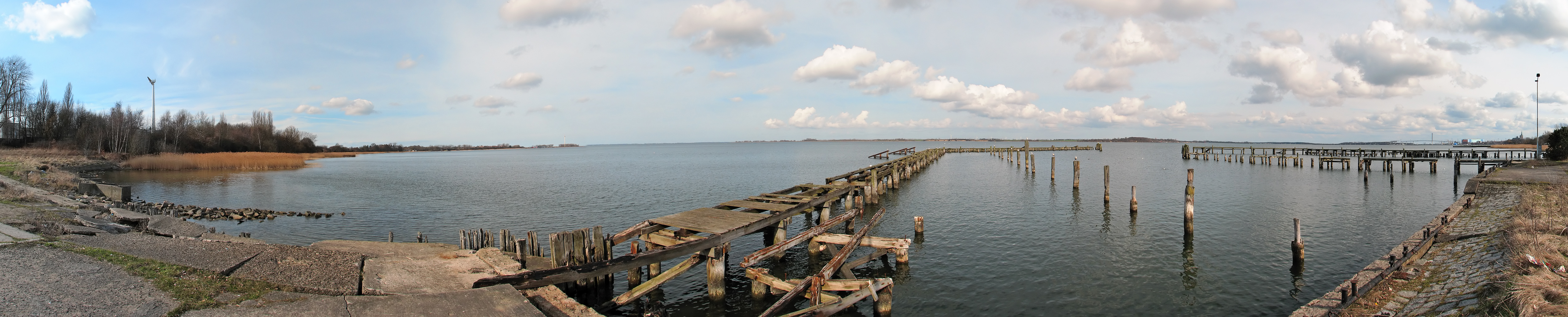
Panorama of the sound looking over to Rügen
