= Bergen auf Rügen–Lauterbach Mole railway =

Railway line in Germany

Coordinates: 54°22′05″N 13°29′09″E

Bergen auf Rügen–Lauterbach Mole
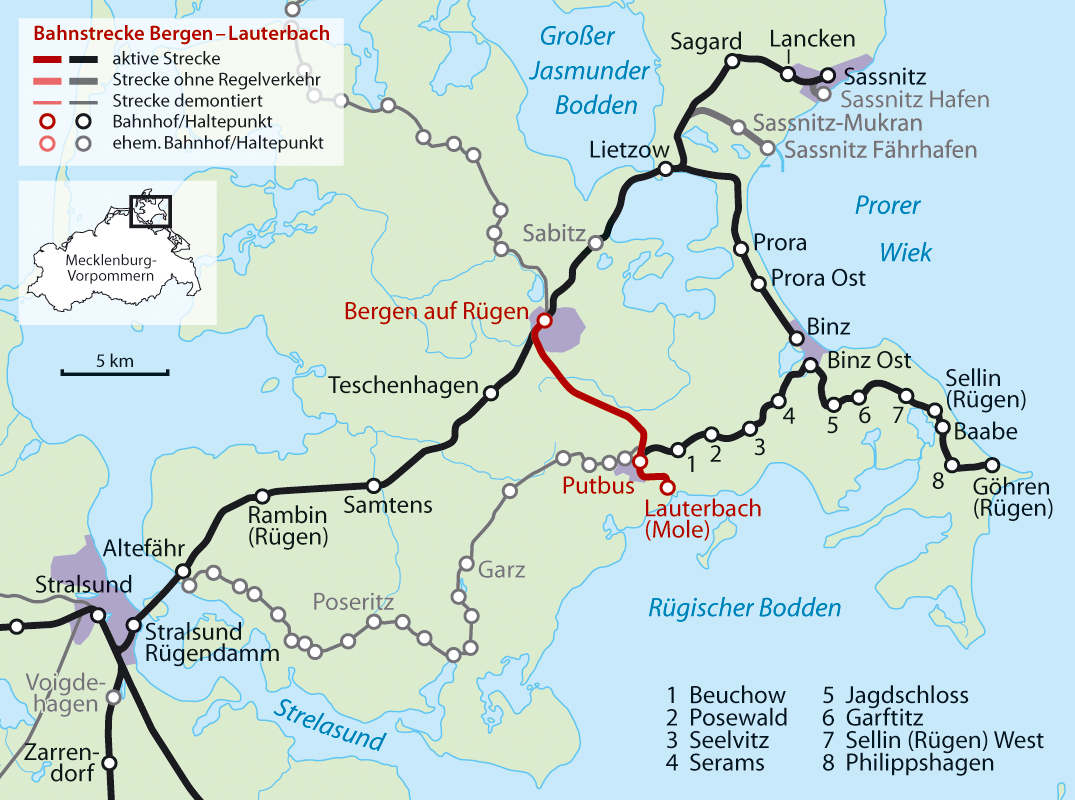
- Route of the Bergen auf Rügen-Lauterbach Mole line

Overview
- Line number: 6775 (Germany)

Service
- Route number: 198 (Germany)

Technical
- Line length: 12.523 km
- Track gauge: 1,435 mm

The Bergen auf Rügen–Lauterbach Mole railway is a single-track branch line on the German island of Rügen in the state of Mecklenburg-Vorpommern.

== Route description ==
The line branches off at Bergen auf Rügen station from the Stralsund–Sassnitz railway. It runs southeast, through Putbus to Lauterbach Mole and ends on the shore of the Rügischer Bodden. In Putbus there is a junction with the steam-operated, narrow gauge Rügen Light Railway to Göhren via the Baltic Sea resort of Binz. Standard-gauge trains are diesel railcars. Narrow-gauge trains are hauled from Putbus to Lauterbach Mole by steam; as there is no passing loop there, are hauled back by a diesel engine attached to the rear.

== History ==
Until the opening of the Rügen Causeway (Rügendamm) in 1935, there was only an isolated railway network on the island of Rügen. There were two standard gauge lines, Altefähr to Sassnitz and the branch from Bergen to Lauterbach. This branch was opened on 15 August 1889 as far as Putbus and extended to Lauterbach on 15 May 1890. To 1945 there was a siding to the Lauterbach landing stage. In 1998 the terminal halt, Lauterbach Mole, was opened and the station in Lauterbach itself closed. Since 28 May 1999 the section from Putbus to Lauterbach Mole has been dual gauge (750/1435 mm), enabling the narrow gauge trains of the Rügen Light Railway (Rügenschen Bäderbahn, RüBB) as well as standard gauge trains to operate during the summer. Since 9 December 2006, Lauterbach has been opened again as a halt.

After the bankruptcy of the Karsdorfer Eisenbahngesellschaft (KEG), who had developed the timetable after 2003/2004, the Ostmecklenburgische Eisenbahn (OME) were given the contract by the state of Mecklenburg-Vorpommern to run local passenger rail services. In February 2004, services were taken over by the OME. From 2005 to December 2009, services were delivered by the Ostseeland-Verkehr (OLA). This was formed by a merger of the Ostmecklenburgischen Eisenbahn (OME) and the Mecklenburg Bahn (MEBA). On the change of timetable in December 2009 the Eisenbahn-Bau- und Betriebsgesellschaft Pressnitztalbahn (PRESS) took over operations on the line for 9 years.

== Services ==
Since the timetable change on 13 December 2009, the line has operated two-hourly services (hourly from May to August) by PRESS using a RegioShuttle unit from Stadler.

== Gallery ==
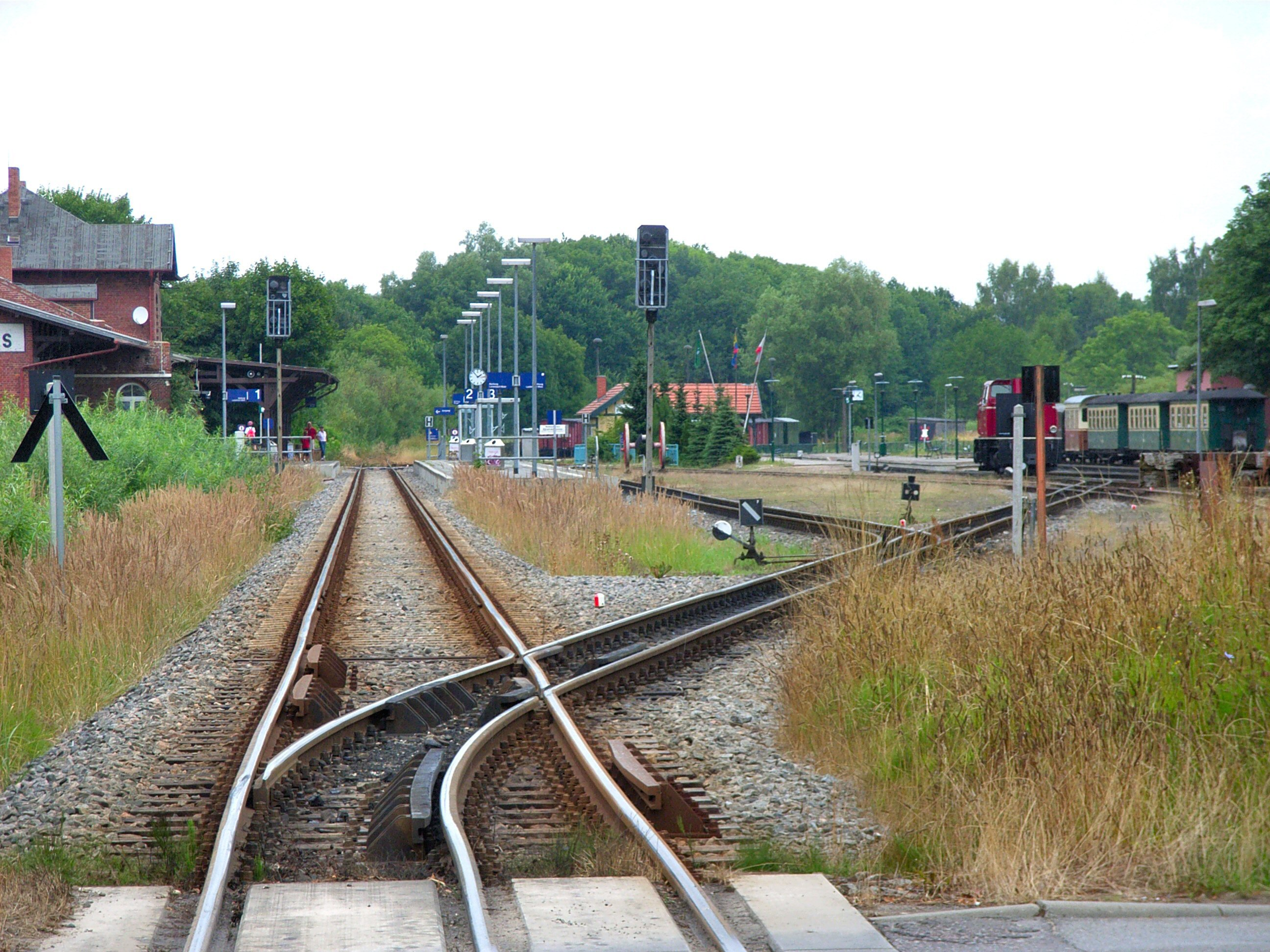
Putbus station with the narrow gauge line looking towards Lauterbach Mole

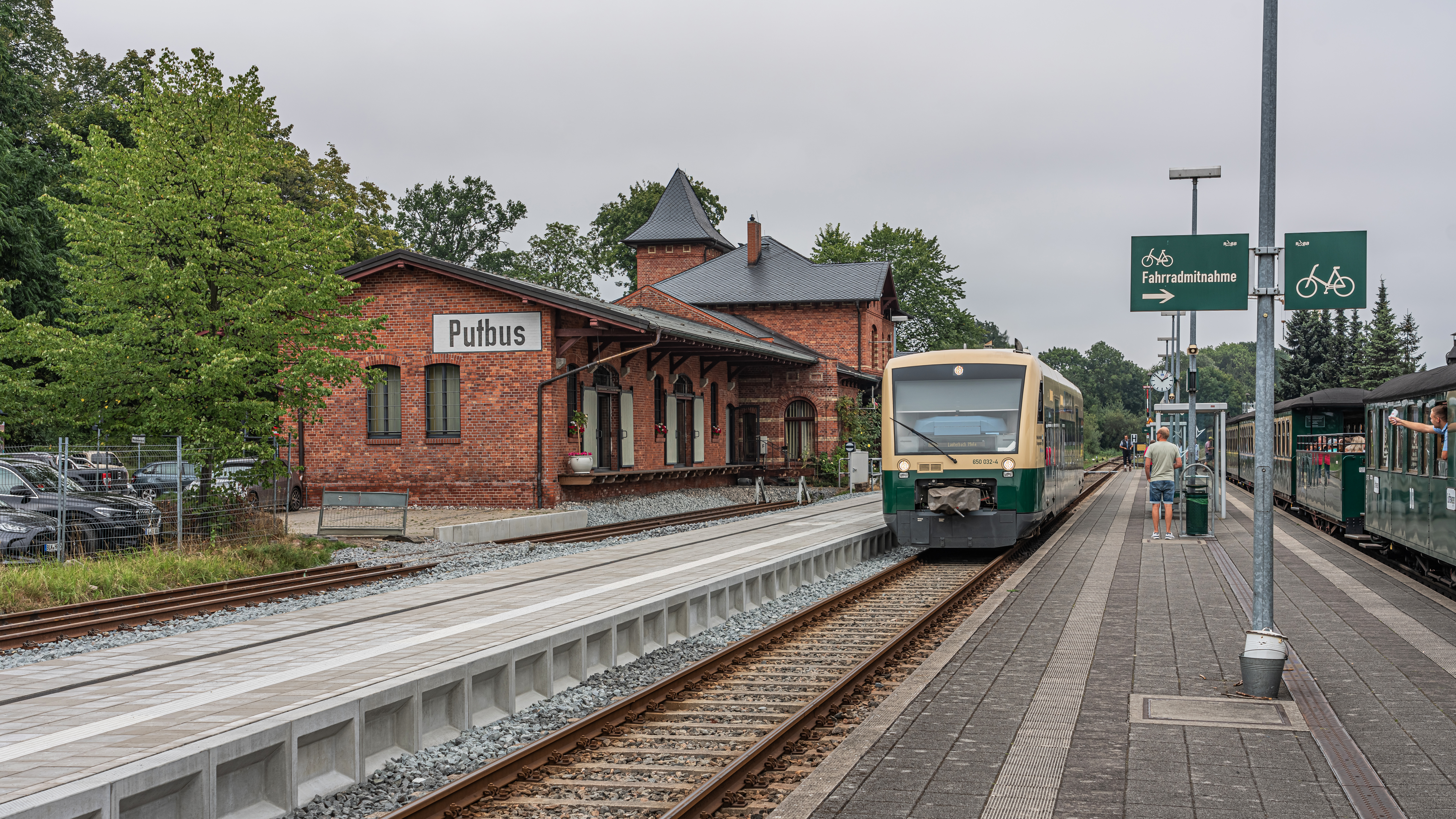
Putbus station

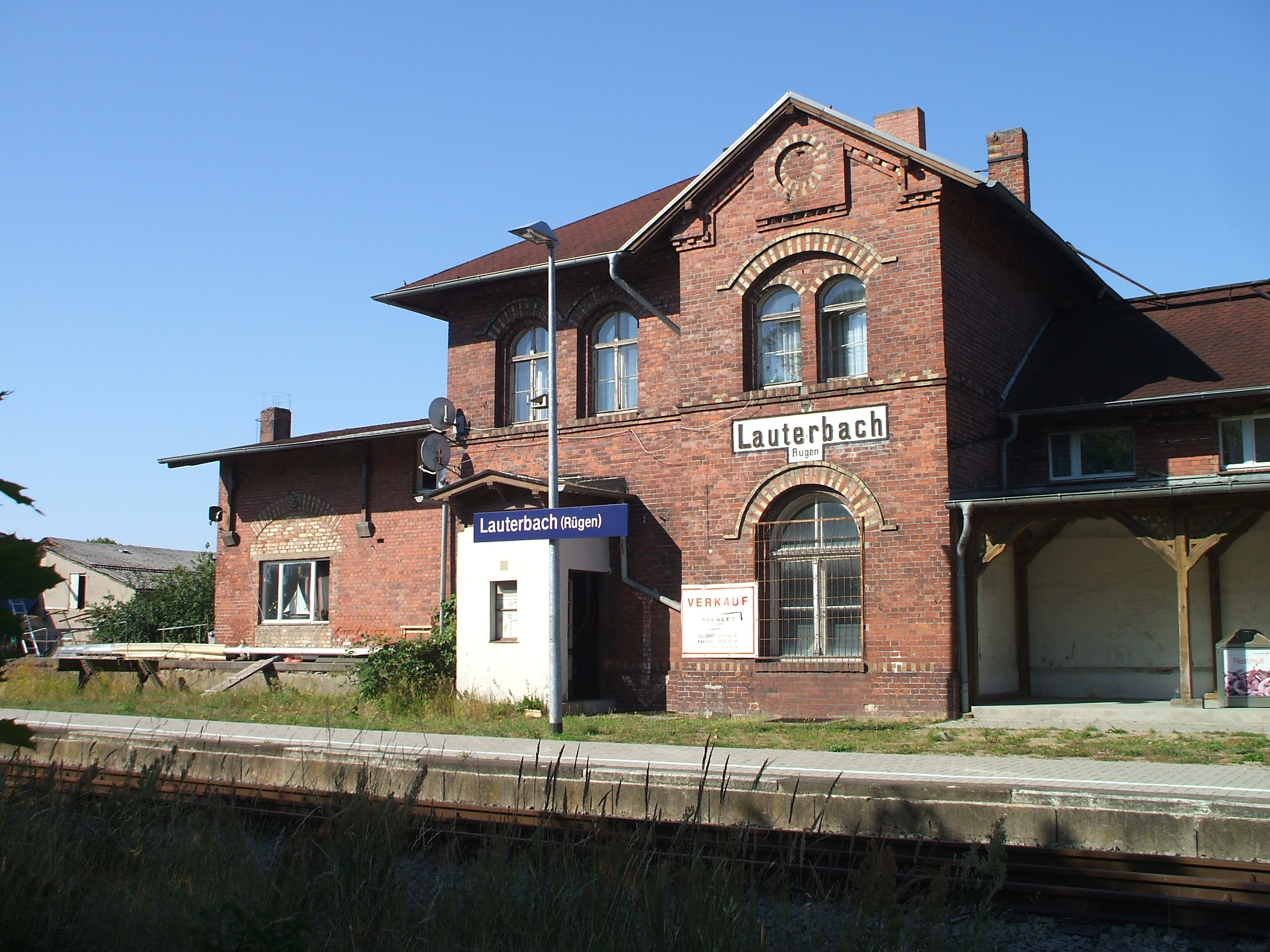
Lauterbach station

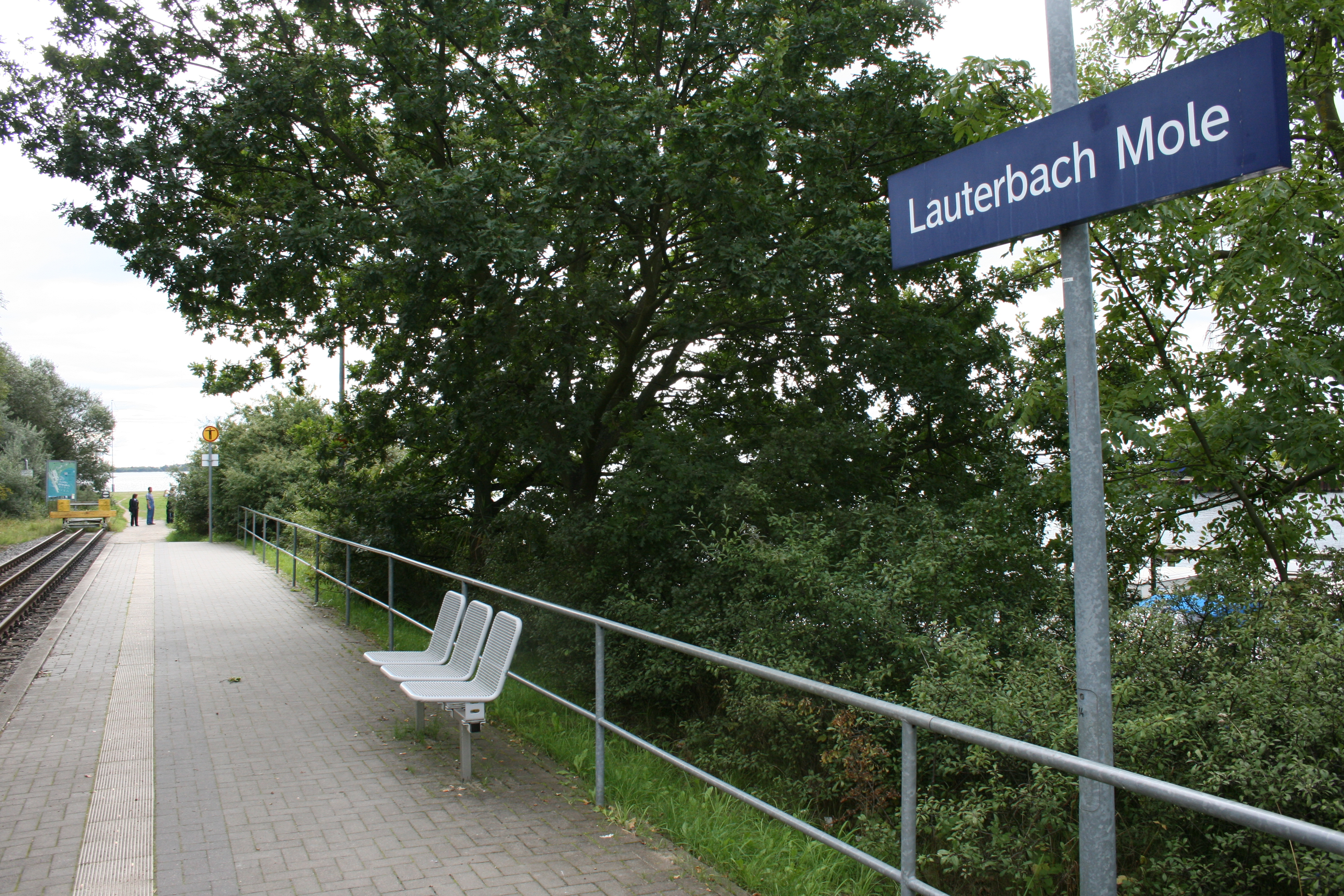
Lauterbach Mole halt and buffer stop

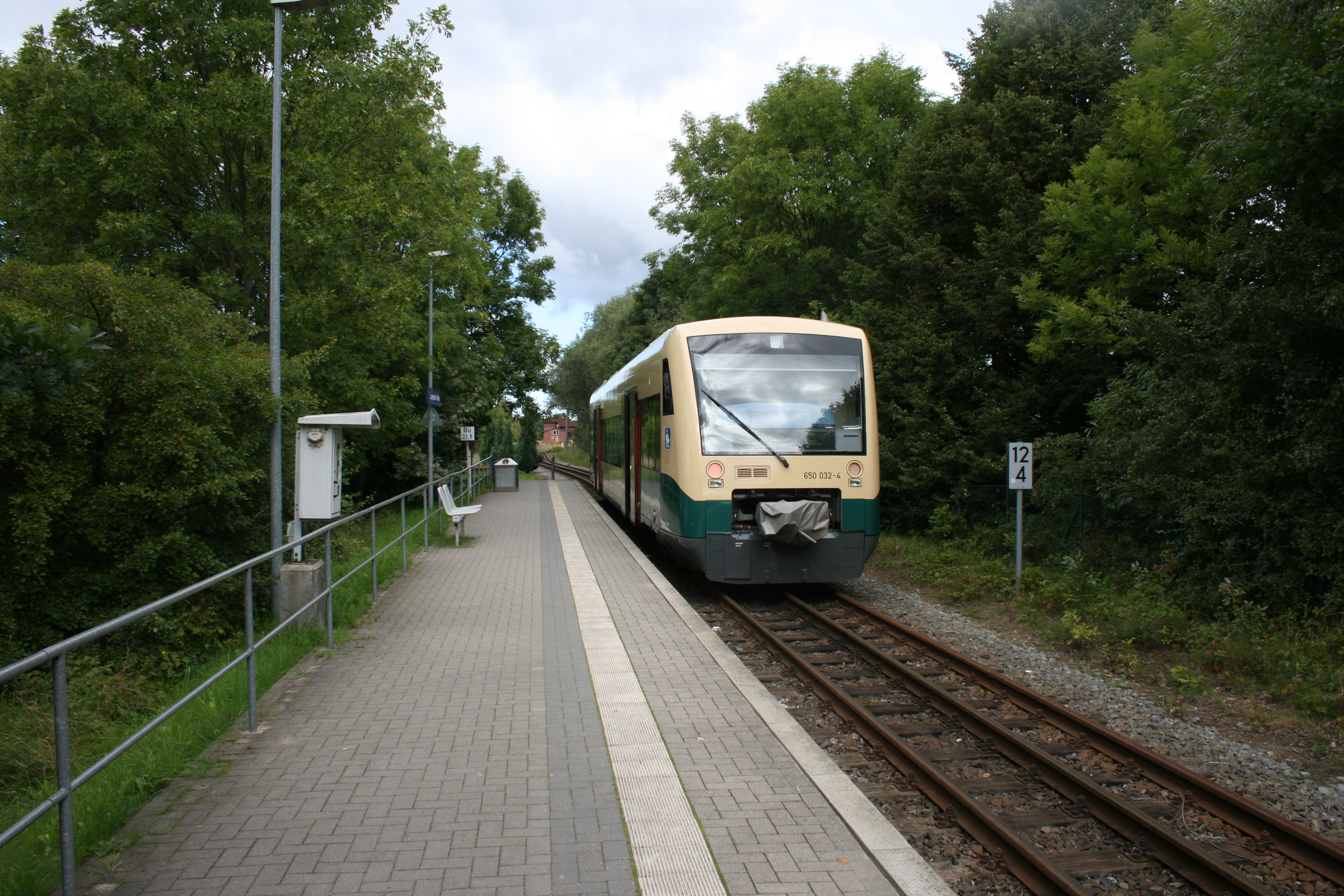
Number 650 032-4 at Lauterbach Mole halt
