= Altefähr =

- Municipality
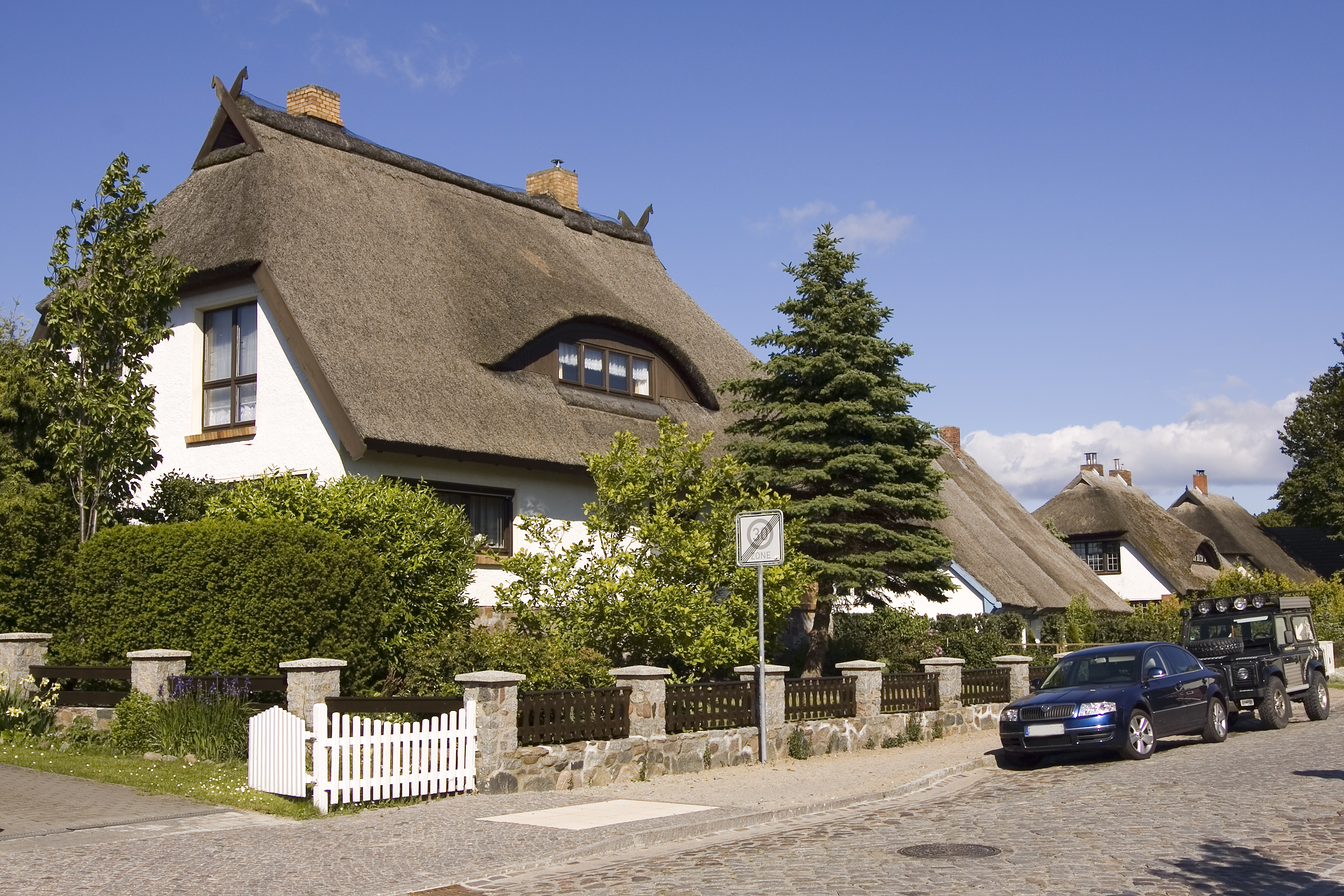
- Traditional houses of Altefähr (with thatched roofs)

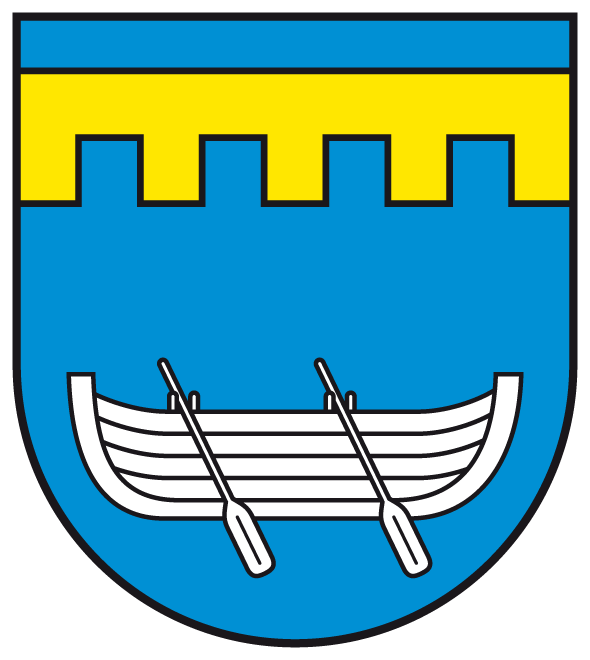
- Coat of arms

- Location of Altefähr within Vorpommern-Rügen district
- Interactive map of Altefähr
- Location within Germany Location within Mecklenburg-Vorpommern
- Coordinates: 54°19′48″N 13°07′35″E
- Country: Germany
- State: Mecklenburg-Vorpommern
- District: Vorpommern-Rügen
- Municipal assoc.: West-Rügen

Government
  - Mayor: Ingulf Donig

Area
  - Total: 20.59 km^{2} (7.95 sq mi)
- Elevation: 3 m (9.8 ft)

Population (2025-12-31)
  - Total: 1,269
  - Density: 61.63/km^{2} (159.6/sq mi)
- Time zone: UTC+01:00 (CET)
  - Summer (DST): UTC+02:00 (CEST)
- Postal codes: 18573
- Dialling codes: 038306
- Vehicle registration: RÜG

Altefähr is a municipality in the Vorpommern-Rügen district, in Mecklenburg-Vorpommern, Germany.

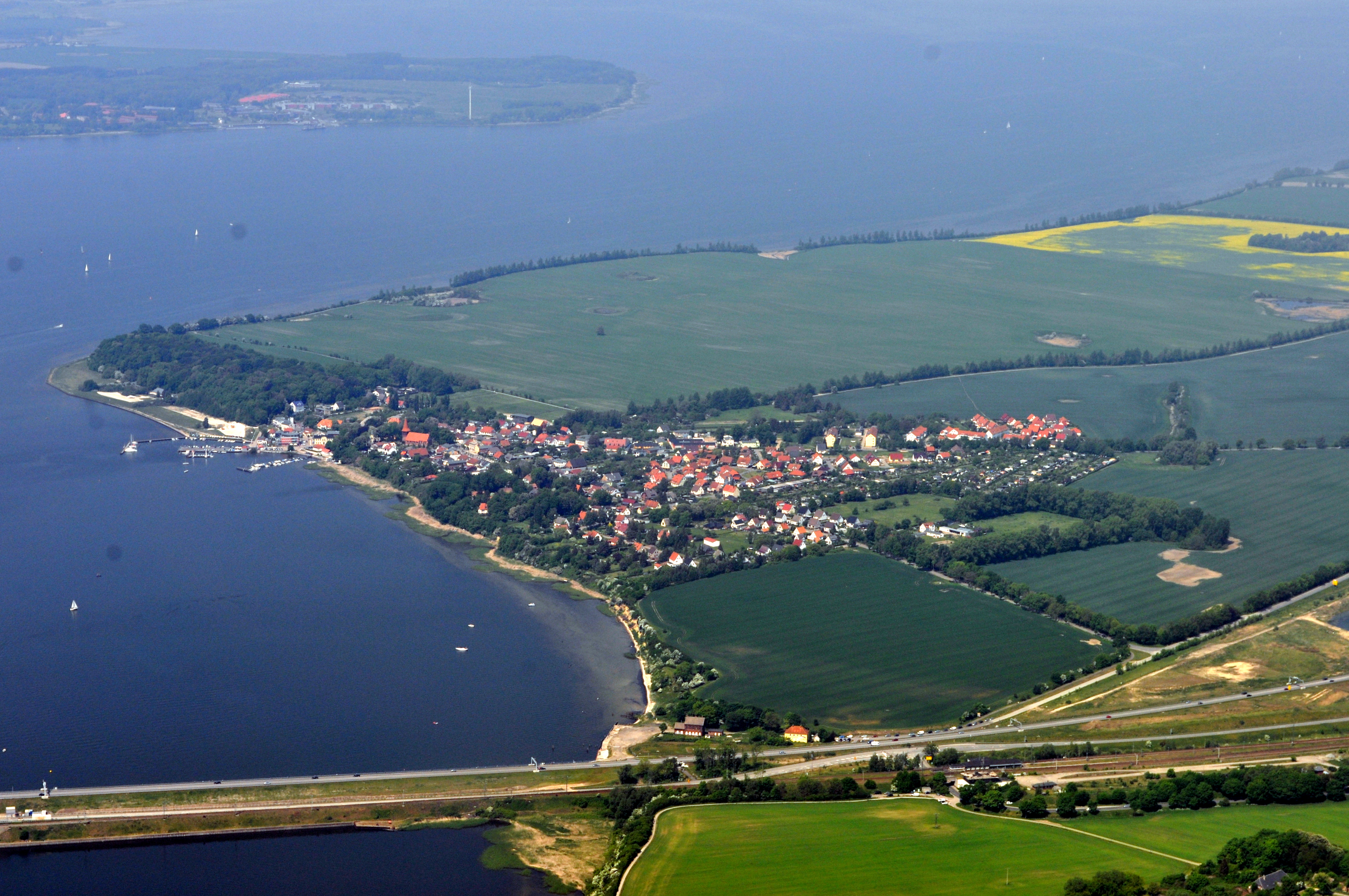
Altefähr (2011)

== Transport ==
- Altefähr railway station is served by local services between Rostock, Stralsund and Sassnitz.
