= Stralsund–Sassnitz railway =

Railway line

Stralsund–Sassnitz
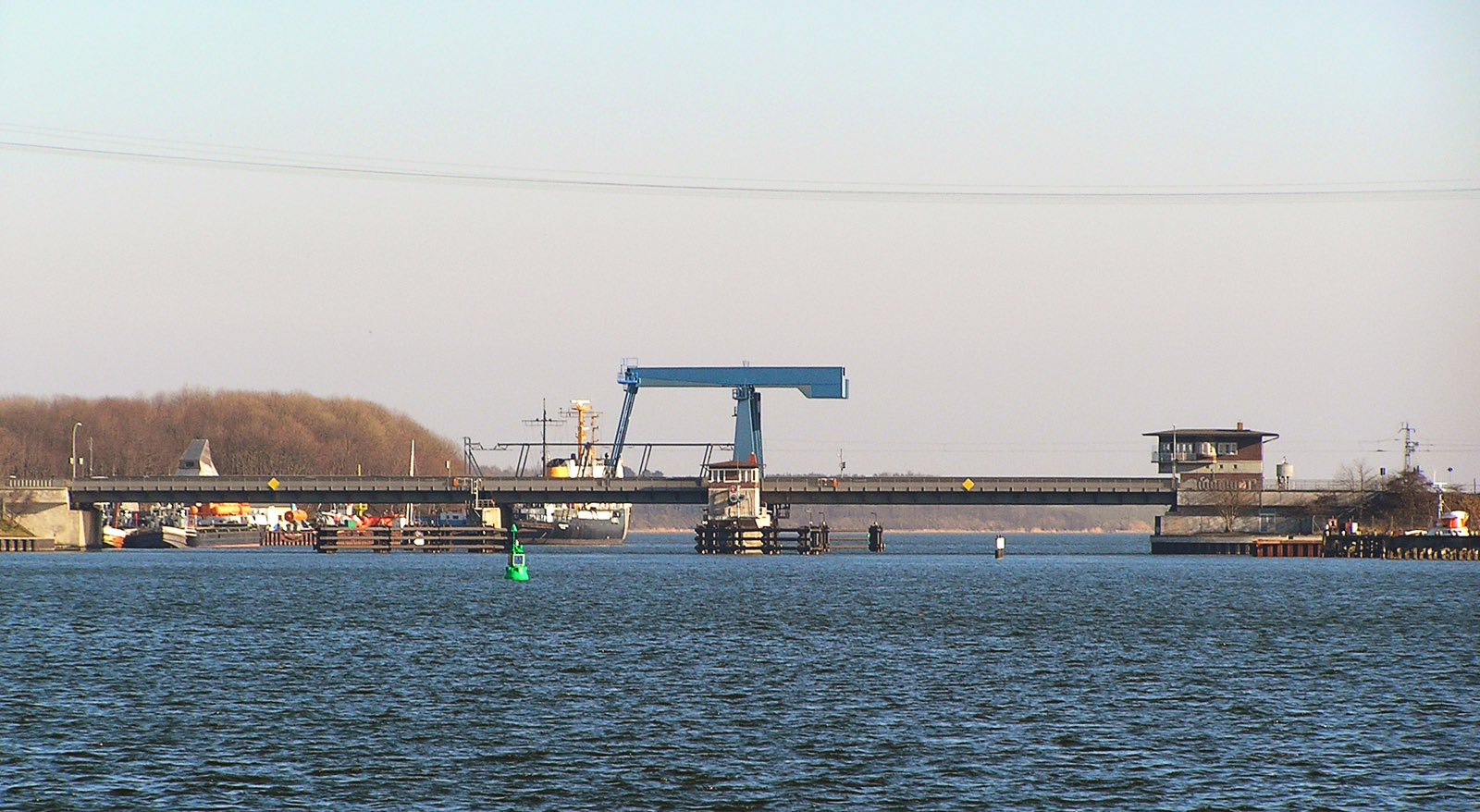
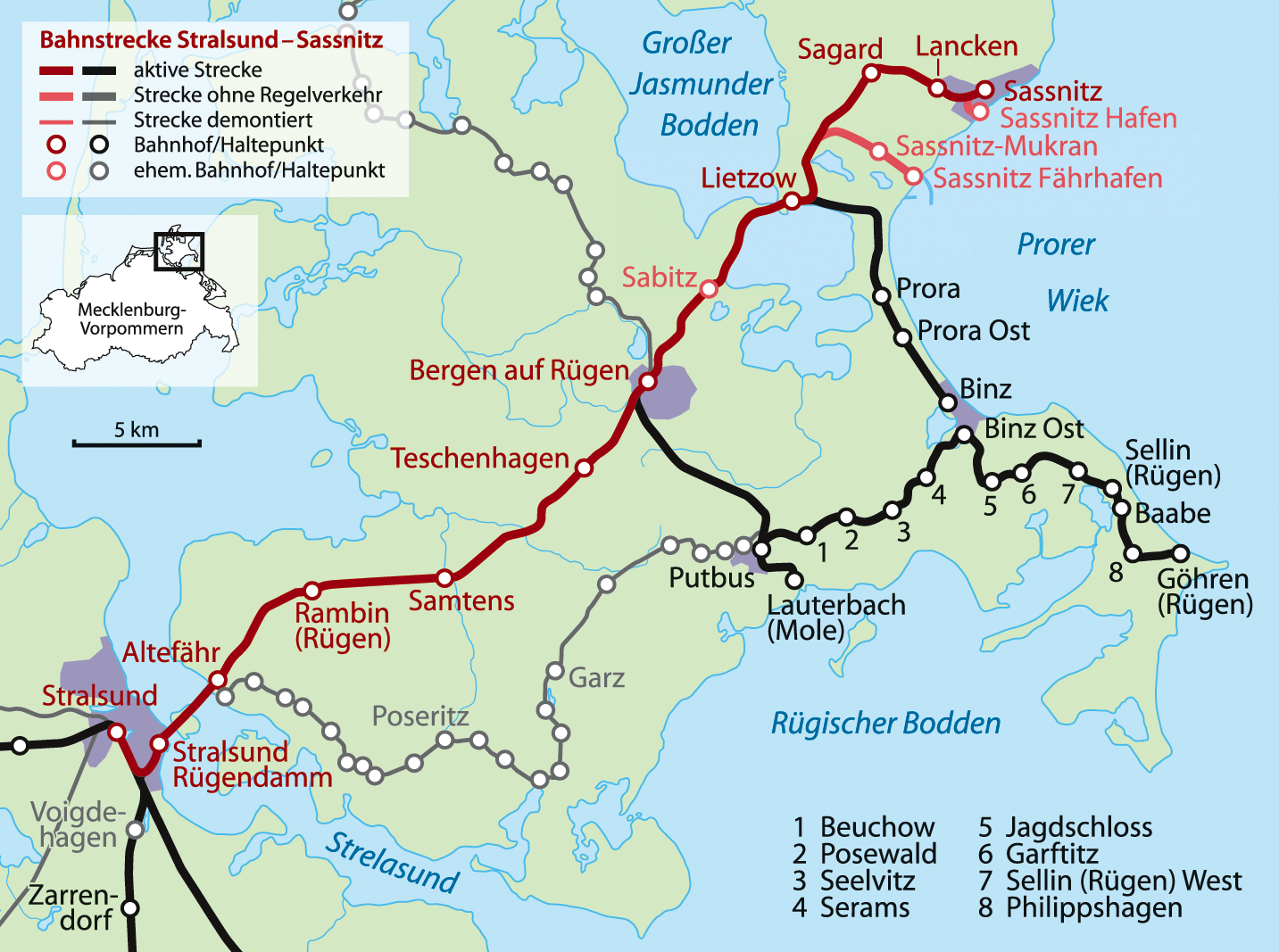
- The Ziegelgraben Bridge as part of the Rügen Causeway is the most important structure on the line Route of the Stralsund–Sassnitz line

Overview
- Line number: 6321 Stralsund–Sassnitz; 6777 Sassnitz–Sassnitz Hafen; 6954 Borchtitz–Mukran

Service
- Route number: 190

Technical
- Line length: 53.2 km (Line class: mostly D4) (Double-track railway: Stralsund Central–Stralsund Rügendamm; Altefähr Bridge Jasmunder Bodden)
- Track gauge: 1,435 mm (4 ft 8 1/2 in)
- Electrification: 15 kV 16.7 Hz AC
- Maximum incline: 2.7 %

Stralsund–Sassnitz railway is a railway line, most of which is located on the German island of Rügen and which is its most important railway. The line is the northernmost German section of the route from Berlin to Stockholm.

== Course ==
The line starts at Stralsund Central Station. Even before it leaves the station yard, it branches off from the Angermünde-Stralsund Railway and swings away to the northeast. A link curve to the south enables trains to run straight into Stralsund from the island of Rügen without having to change direction. After passing the branch to the port of Stralsund (Stralsunder Hafen), it reaches the Rügen Causeway (Rügendamm).

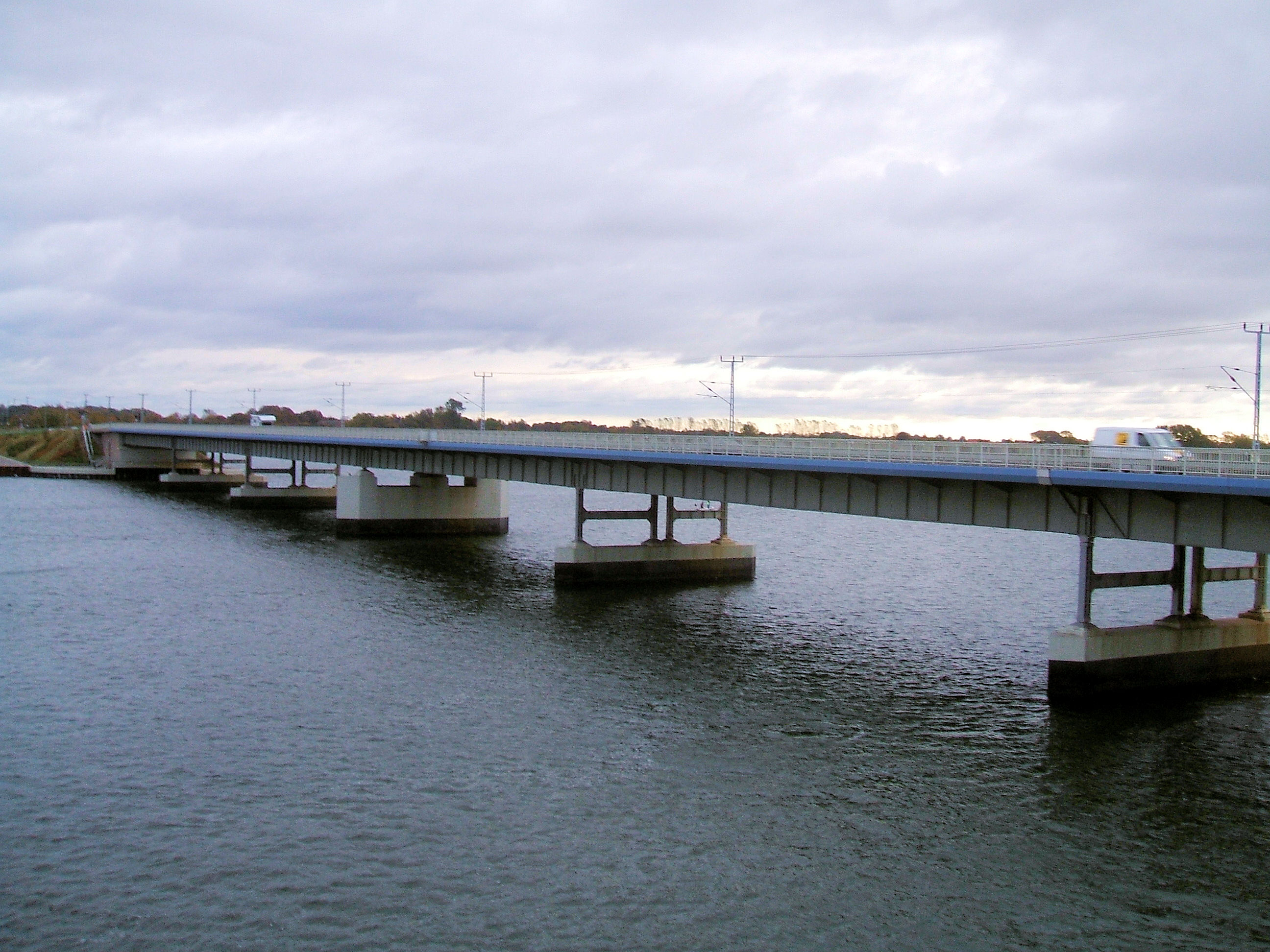
Strelasund Bridge

Shortly thereafter, the line passes over the 133-metre-long Ziegelgraben Bridge - a bascule bridge - to the island of Dänholm off the Strelasund. Then it goes over the 540-metre-long Strelasund Bridge to the island of Rügen. The Ziegelgraben Bridge, the Strelasund Bridge and the embankments on the mainland and Dänholm form the Rügen Causeway which has a total length of 2,500 metres.

The line runs through Altefähr, Rambin, Samtens and Teschenhagen to Bergen auf Rügen, the starting point for the branch line to Lauterbach Mole. From Bergen it continues in a northeasterly direction along the north coast of the lagoon known as the Kleiner Jasmunder Bodden. In Lietzow the train crosses the causeway, built in 1869, that separates the Kleiner from the Großer Jasmunder Bodden. Behind Lietzow the branch line to Binz branches off, a branch which is also worked by Intercity trains.

About four miles further on, at Borchtitz, the connecting line to the Mukran Ferry Port branches off in a southeasterly direction. Both international passenger trains to Sweden, which use the so-called Kings Line ferry, as well as freight trains to Lithuanian Klaipėda pass along this four kilometre long section to the ferry.

Trains to Sassnitz leave from Borchtitz carrying straight on. The track, which was previously only a few metres above sea level in most places, passes initially Sagard and reaches its highest point at elevation of about 70 metres above NN just before Lancken. Sassnitz station (called Saßnitz until 1993) is located north of the town centre and is designed as a railway terminus. From here, the connecting line to the old Sassnitz harbour (Sassnitzer Hafen) ran away in a long curve to the left, climbing a vertical height of almost 35 metres over a distance of about two kilometres. At Sassnitz Harbour there used to be ferry slips (Fährbrücken) as well before the ferry operation was shifted to Mukran.

The line is electrified over its total length using catenary carrying 15 kV, 16.7 Hz AC and, with the exception of the sections from Stralsund Rügendamm to Altefähr and Lietzow to Sassnitz Hafen/Sassnitz Fährhafen Rügen, also double-tracked.

== History ==
Even at the time of the opening of the Angermünde-Stralsund Railway in 1863, efforts were being made to extend services through Rügen towards Sweden. It took another 20 years, however, until 1 July 1883, before the first short section was opened between the towns of Altefähr and Bergen auf Rügen. A fixed Strelasund crossing was considered, but none of the options was persuasive, so the Prussian state railways established a railway ferry instead, across the Strelasund between Stralsund Harbour and Altefähr.

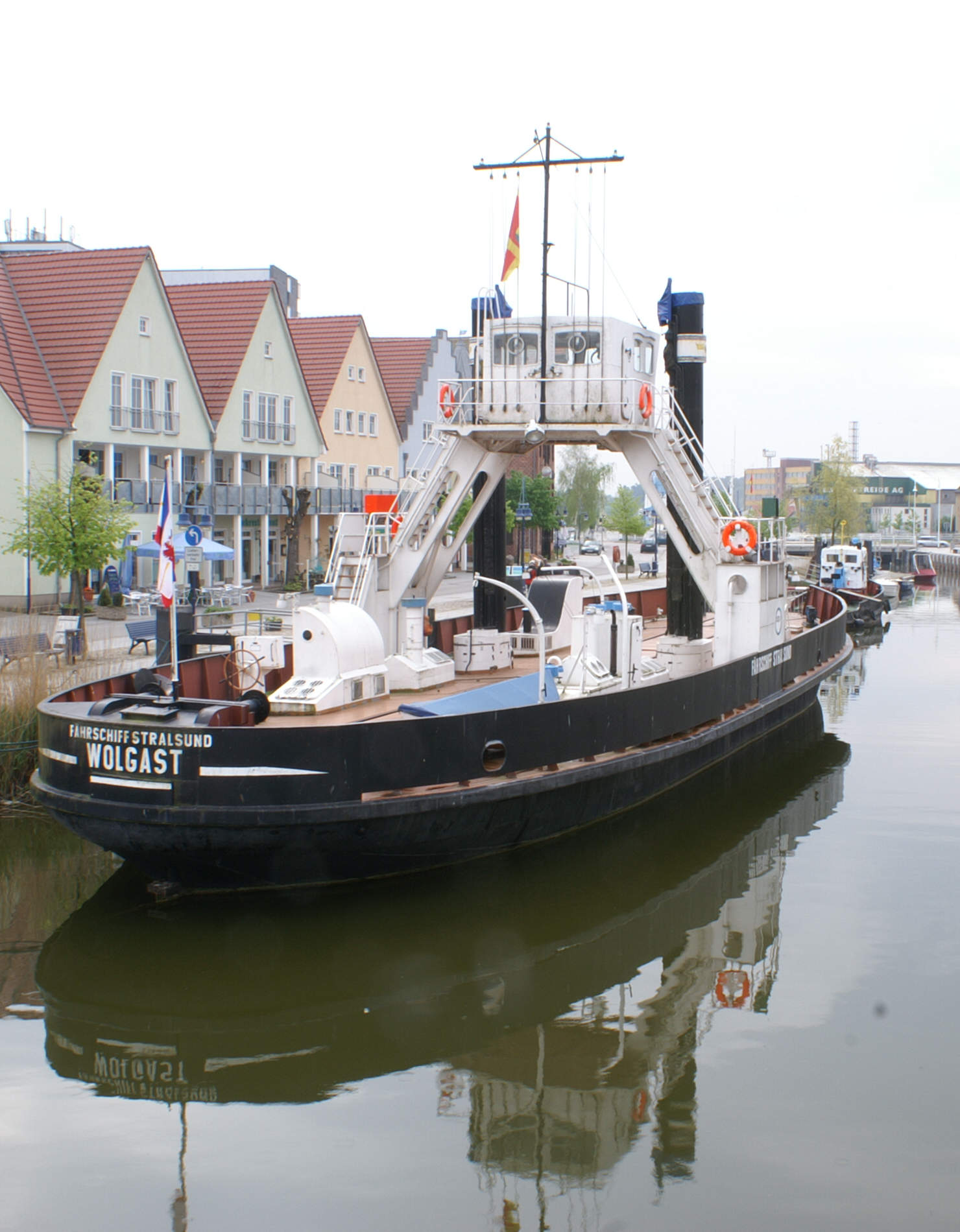
The Stralsund Ferry operated the railway ferry service over the Strela Sound from 1890 to 1936.

Eight years later, on 1 July 1891, the railway was extended from Bergen via Lietzow to Sassnitz. To operate mailboat services between Sassnitz and Trelleborg, the line was extended by two kilometres on 1 May 1897 from Sassnitz station to the port of Sassnitz. For space reasons, the tracks from Sassnitz had to be run out to the southwest, allowing trains to and from the port in Sassnitz to make the necessary change of direction. The route, which climbs a height difference of about 30 metres, has a maximum gradient of 27 per mille.

Twelve years later, the Kingdom of Sweden and the German Empire agreed to open a railway ferry between Sassnitz and Trelleborg. Each party built two ferries to operate the service. The port installations in Sassnitz were modified accordingly. The trains could transfer to the ships over two ferry slips after changing direction again at the port. The link was called the Kings Line because of the presence of the two monarchs at its opening ceremony. A pair of night trains was established running between Berlin and Stockholm and covering the distance in about 22 hours.

As a result of the ferry services to Sweden, traffic on the railway increased steadily so that the question of a fixed crossing of the Strelasund came up again. In 1927, the first concrete proposals were submitted, the options of a bridge and a tunnel being eliminated because of the higher costs for the ramps. In 1931, the decision was taken in favour of a causeway combining embankment sections and bridges, the Rügendamm. The crossing was built in the years 1933 to 1936 for both rail and the envisaged road traffic and consists of five sections:

- Mainland embankment
- Ziegelgraben Bridge (133 metres) – bascule bridge
- Dänholm embankment
- Rügendamm Bridge (540 metres)
- Rügen embankment

The five sections have a total length of about two and a half kilometres. With the opening of the Rügen Causeway (Rügendamm) to railway traffic on 5 October 1936, ferry services between the port of Stralsund and Altefähr were discontinued. The journey time was shortened by around one hour.

The Second World War caused damage to the line, especially in the area of Stralsund. On 1 May the Ziegelgraben Bridge was blown up and, two days later, the Strelasund Bridge was also demolished by retreating Wehrmacht soldiers. As a result, the Rügendamm was closed for the next two years and did not re-open until 15 October 1947 after the erection of temporary bridges, whereupon international traffic to Sweden could be resumed. The temporary bridges lasted until 1961 before being replaced by the Dessau Steelworks (Stahlbau Dessau).

To increase the ferry capacity further, the GDR leadership decided to build a new ferry port in Sassnitz quarter of Mukran. Once this was completed, the port initially only handled goods traffic to Sweden, and the Port of Klaipėda in the Soviet Union (now in Lithuania). Because the latter ferry service linked to Russian broad gauge rail ferries with a track gauge of 1,520 mm (4 ft 11 27/32 in), change of gauge facilities were installed in Mukran. To connect to the ferry port a stub line was built from Borchtitz. Shortly after this branches off, the trackage spreads out into the Mukran marshalling yard, where the northern track system is standard gauge and the southern track system is broad gauge. There are two ferry slips leading onto the ferries for each gauge.

Simultaneously with the construction of the port, the lines from Stralsund to Sassnitz and Borchtitz to Mukran were electrified, being completed on 27 May 1989. On Ziegelgraben Bridge a rigid overhead power line was laid instead of the normal overhead catenary. At the same time the Deutsche Reichsbahn erected a power line over the Strela Sound to supply the island network whenever the Ziegelgraben Bridge was opened.

Shortly after electrification, the Deutsche Reichsbahn electrification began the restoration of the Rügendamm in 1990 and a complete replacement of the superstructure. For example, the five bridge segments of the Strelasund Bridge were completely replaced between 9 and 13 May 1990 in an 84.5-hour break by the Dessau Steelworks. The parts were prefabricated in Mukran and then taken by two floating cranes to their destination. The Ziegelgraben Bridge was renovated two years later. During a 15-day closure between 6 and 22 May 1992, all essential elements of bridge were dismantled and replaced with new components. The mechanical drive of the bridge was replaced by a hydraulic one. The replacement of the bridge segments was again handled by floating cranes. After completion of the work the top speed of the line on the Rügendamm, which had fallen to just 30 km/h towards the end, was raised again to 90 km/h.

On 7 January 1998, passenger ferry services from the old Sassnitz harbour were transferred to the Mukran ferry terminal following its conversion. About three years later, on 1 December 2000, the steep section of line to Sassnitz Harbour was closed.

== Rail services and rolling stock ==
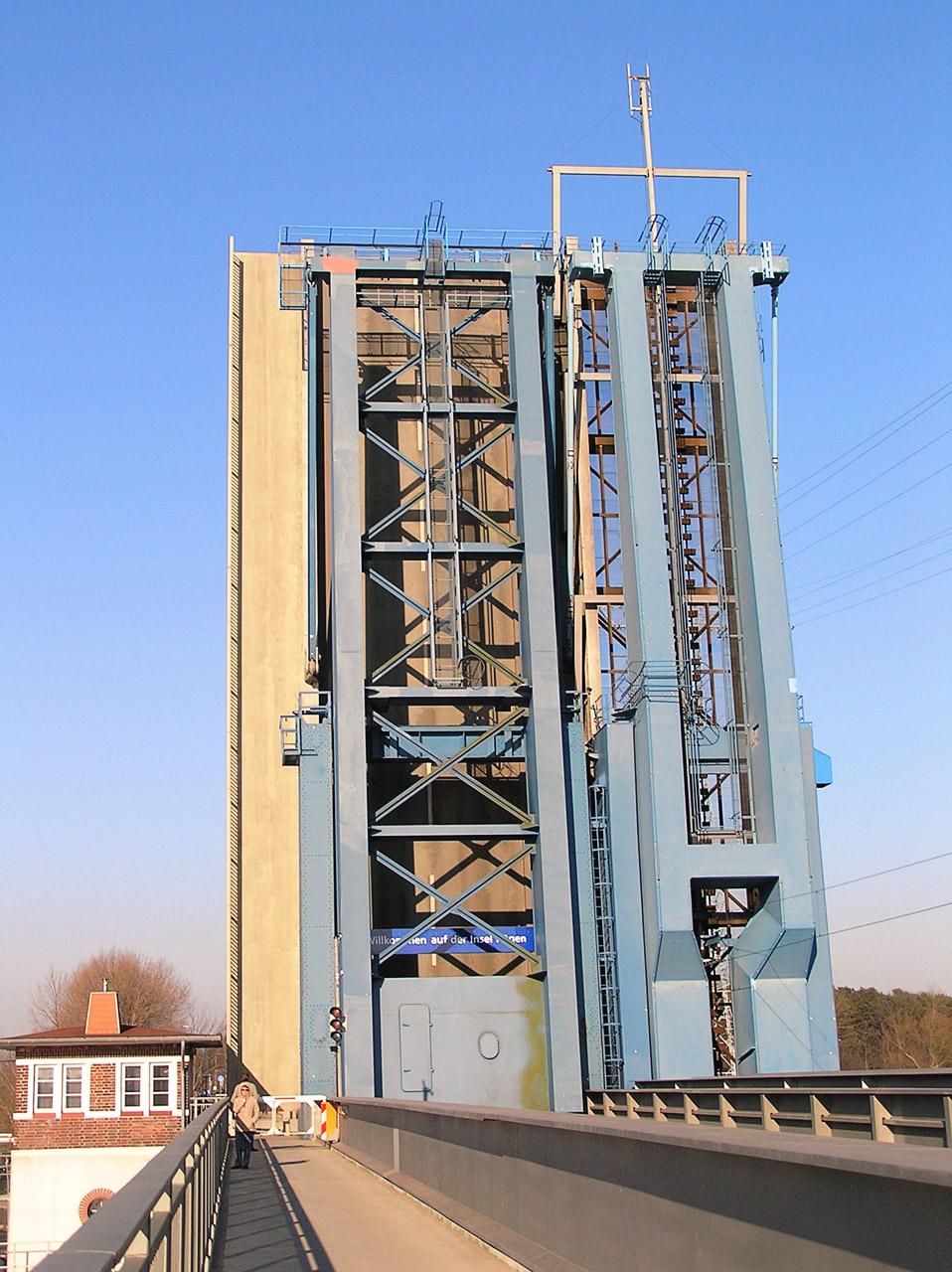
Ziegelgraben Bridge in the open position. The rod protruding from the bridge is used to attach the rigid power rail.

The line is used for both long-distance and local passenger services as well as goods trains. In long-distance traffic individual trains on InterCity services (nos. 26, 27, 30 and 51) stop at the Stralsund and Bergen, before continuing to Binz. These trains are usually hauled by electric locomotives of classes 101 and 120. In addition, a single Berlin Night Express pair of trains runs between Berlin and the Swedish city of Malmö without stopping on Rügen. The night train, which comprises sleepers and couchette cars, is hauled by Class 182 electric locomotives.

Regional services are provided by RE line 9 between Stralsund and Sassnitz or Binz at 60-minute intervals. Until the transition to multiple units of Class 429/829 the trains comprised electric locomotives of Class 143 and double-decker coaches.

Goods transport mainly consists of transit traffic to Lithuania, Russia and Sweden. Although this decreased dramatically after 1989, it still makes the largest proportion of the total volume of goods. The trains are usually headed by electric locomotives of Class 155. Broad gauge duties in Mukran continue to be carried out by Class 347 shunters, which were Class 346 engines modified for use on 1,520 mm (4 ft 11 27/32 in) track gauge.

Ferry service to Sweden ended temporarily on 13 March 2020, a decision made permanent the following month

== Literature ==
- Dieter Grusenick; Erich Morlok; Horst Regling (1999), Die Angermünde-Stralsunder Eisenbahn (in German), Stuttgart: transpress, ISBN 3-613-71095-1
