= List of railway stations in Mecklenburg-Vorpommern =

This list includes all passenger stations and halts in the state of Mecklenburg-Vorpommern in eastern Germany, that are used by scheduled services.

== Key ==
The list contains the following information:

- Name: Here the current name of the station or halt is given.
- City/District: This column shows the (abbreviated) district (Landkreis) or district-free city in which the station is located. The following towns and counties are found in the state:
  - Ludwigslust-Parchim (Lu.-Pa.)
  - Mecklenburgische Seenplatte (M. Seenpl.)
  - Nordwestmecklenburg (Nwmeck.)
  - Rostock (city, Rost.-c)
  - Rostock (district) (Rost.-d)
  - Schwerin (city)
  - Vorpommern-Greifswald (V.-Greif.)
  - Vorpommern-Rügen (V.-Rügen)
- Transport Union (Verkehrsverbund): The only Mecklenburg transport union that is integrated into the public transport system is the Warnow Transport Union (Verkehrsverbund Warnow orVVW), which covers the Hanseatic city of Rostock and the neighbouring counties of Bad Doberan and Güstrow.
- Cat: The Cat column shows the present-day category of the station as at 1 January 2008. This only affects stations that are run by DB Station&Service and excludes stations run by private operators like the Usedomer Bäderbahn.
- The next five columns n show the types of train that serve the station. The DB AG abbreviations are used; for other operators the nearest equivalent is shown:
  - ICE – Intercity-Express and similar
  - IC – Intercity, Eurocity and similar, like e.g. Interconnex
  - RE – Regionalexpress and similar
  - RB – Regionalbahn and similar
  - S – S-Bahn
- Route – This column gives the railway routes on which the station lies. Only those routes are named which are still open at the spot where the station is located. e. g. Waren (Müritz) and Neubrandenburg stations both lie on the Mecklenburg Southern Railway. Because this is only worked from Parchim to Waren, Neubrandenburg is not mentioned.
- Remarks – in this column special remarks are given that are not covered in the other columns, in particular the name of the operator.

== Station overview ==
Station	City/ District (Kreis)	Railway operator	Cat	ICE	IC	RE	RB	S	Line	Remarks
Ahlbeck Grenze	V.-Greif.						x		Ducherow–Wolgaster Fähre	Owner: UBB
Ahlbeck Ostseetherme	V.-Greif.						x		Ducherow–Wolgaster Fähre	Owner: UBB
Alt Schwerin	M. Seenpl.		6				x		Parchim–Neubrandenburg	
Altefähr	V.-Rügen		6			x			Stralsund–Sassnitz	
Altentreptow	M. Seenpl.		6			x	x		Berlin–Stralsund	
Altenwillershagen	V.-Rügen		6			x			Rostock–Stralsund	
Althof	Rost.-d	VVW	7			x	x		Wismar–Rostock	
Anklam	V.-Greif.		5		x	x			Angermünde–Stralsund	
Baabe	V.-Rügen						x		Göhren–Lauterbach Mole	Owner: RüBB; 750 mm
Bad Doberan	Rost.-d	VVW	5			x	x		Bad Doberan–Kühlungsborn; Wismar–Rostock	two gauges 900 + 1435 mm
Bad Doberan Goethestraße	Rost.-d	VVW					x		Bad Doberan–Kühlungsborn	Owner: MBB; 900 mm
Bad Doberan Stadtmitte	Rost.-d	VVW					x		Bad Doberan–Kühlungsborn	Owner: MBB; 900 mm
Bad Kleinen	Nwmeck.		4		x	x			Bad Kleinen–Rostock; Lübeck–Bad Kleinen; Ludwigslust–Wismar	
Bannemin-Mölschow	V.-Greif.						x		Ducherow–Wolgaster Fähre	Owner: UBB
Bansin Seebad	V.-Greif.						x		Ducherow–Wolgaster Fähre	Owner: UBB
Barth	V.-Rügen						x		Velgast–Barth	Owner: UBB
Bentwisch	Rost.-d	VVW	6				x		Rostock–Stralsund	
Bergen auf Rügen	V.-Rügen		3		x	x	x		Bergen auf Rügen–Lauterbach Mole; Stralsund–Sassnitz	
Beuchow	V.-Rügen						x		Göhren–Lauterbach Mole	Owner: RüBB; 750 mm
Binz Ost	V.-Rügen						x		Göhren–Lauterbach Mole	Owner: RüBB; 750 mm
Blankenberg (Meckl)	Lu.-Pa		6			x			Bad Kleinen–Rostock	
Blankensee (Meckl)	M. Seenpl.		6			x			Berlin–Stralsund	
Blumenhagen	V.-Greif.		6			x	x		Bützow–Szczecin	
Bobitz	Nwmeck.		7			x			Lübeck–Bad Kleinen	
Boizenburg (Elbe)	Lu.-Pa.		6			x			Berlin–Hamburg	
Brahlstorf	Lu.-Pa.		6			x			Berlin–Hamburg	
Broderstorf	Rost.-d	VVW	6			x			Rostock–Tessin	
Buchenhorst	V.-Rügen		6			x			Rostock–Stralsund	
Buddenhagen	V.-Greif.						x		Züssow–Wolgast Hafen	Owner: UBB
Burg Stargard (Meckl)	M. Seenpl.		6			x			Berlin–Stralsund	
Bützow	Rost.-d	VVW	4	x	x	x	x		Bad Kleinen–Rostock; Bützow–Szczecin	
Cammin (Meckl)	M. Seenpl.		6			x			Berlin–Stralsund	
Crivitz	Lu.-Pa.		6				x		Schwerin–Parchim	
Demmin	M. Seenpl.		5			x	x		Berlin–Stralsund	
Domsühl	Lu.-Pa.		7				x		Schwerin–Parchim	
Dorf Mecklenburg	Nwmeck.		6			x			Ludwigslust–Wismar	
Ducherow	V.-Greif.		6			x			Angermünde–Stralsund	
Dütschow	Lu.-Pa.		7				x		Parchim–Ludwigslust	
Eggesin	V.-Greif.		7				x		Jatznick–Ueckermünde	
Elmenhorst	V.-Rügen		6			x	x		Berlin–Stralsund	
Ferdinandshof	V.-Greif.		6			x	x		Angermünde–Stralsund	
Friedrichsruhe (Meckl)	Lu.-Pa.		7				x		Schwerin–Parchim	
Gadebusch	Nwmeck.		7				x		Schwerin–Rehna	
Gallin	Lu.-Pa.		6				x		Parchim–Neubrandenburg	
Garftitz	V.-Rügen						x		Göhren–Lauterbach Mole	Owner: RüBB; 750 mm
Gelbensande	Rost.-d	VVW	6			x			Rostock–Stralsund	
Gnevkow	M. Seenpl.		6			x	x		Berlin–Stralsund	
Göhren (Rügen)	V.-Rügen						x		Göhren–Lauterbach Mole	Owner: RüBB; 750 mm
Graal-Müritz	Rost.-d	VVW	6				x		Rövershagen–Graal-Müritz	
Graal-Müritz Koppelweg	Rost.-d	VVW	7				x		Rövershagen–Graal-Müritz	
Grabow (Meckl)	Lu.-Pa.		6				x		Berlin–Hamburg	
Grambow	V.-Greif.		6			x			Bützow–Szczecin	
Greifswald	V.-Greif.		3		x	x	x		Angermünde–Stralsund	
Greifswald Süd	V.-Greif.		6			x	x		Angermünde–Stralsund	
Grevesmühlen	Nwmeck.		6			x			Lübeck–Bad Kleinen	
Grieben (Meckl)	Nwmeck.		6			x			Lübeck–Bad Kleinen	
Grimmen	V.-Rügen		6			x	x		Berlin–Stralsund	
Groß Brütz	Nwmeck.		6				x		Schwerin–Rehna	
Groß Kiesow	V.-Greif.		6			x	x		Angermünde–Stralsund	
Groß Laasch	Lu.-Pa.		6				x		Parchim–Ludwigslust	
Groß Lüsewitz	Rost.-d	VVW	6			x			Rostock–Tessin	
Groß Quassow	M. Seenpl.		6				x		Wittenberge–Strasburg	
Groß Schwaß	Rost.-d	VVW	6			x			Wismar–Rostock	
Güstrow	Rost.-d	VVW	3		x	x	x	x	Bützow–Szczecin; Güstrow–Schwaan	
Hagebök	Nwmeck.		6			x			Wismar–Rostock	
Hagenow Stadt	Lu.-Pa.						x		Hagenow Land–Zarrentin	
Hagenow Land	Lu.-Pa.		5			x	x		Berlin–Hamburg; Hagenow Land–Holthusen; Hagenow Land–Zarrentin	
Heiligendamm	Rost.-d	VVW					x		Bad Doberan–Kühlungsborn	Owner: MBB; 900 mm
Heringsdorf Neuhof	V.-Greif.						x		Ducherow–Wolgaster Fähre	Owner: UBB
Herrnburg	Nwmeck.		6			x			Lübeck–Bad Kleinen	
Hohendorf	V.-Greif.						x		Züssow–Wolgast Hafen	Owner: UBB
Holdorf (Meckl)	Nwmeck.		6				x		Schwerin–Rehna	
Holthusen	Lu.-Pa.		6			x	x		Hagenow Land–Holthusen; Ludwigslust–Wismar	
Hoppenwalde	V.-Greif.		6				x		Jatznick–Ueckermünde	
Hornstorf	Nwmeck.		6			x			Wismar–Rostock	
Huckstorf	Rost.-d	VVW	6					x	Bad Kleinen–Rostock	
Inselstadt Malchow	M. Seenpl.		6				x		Parchim–Neubrandenburg	
Jabel (Meckl)	M. Seenpl.		6				x		Parchim–Neubrandenburg	
Jagdschloß	V.-Rügen						x		Göhren–Lauterbach Mole	Owner: RüKB; 750 mm
Jasnitz	Lu.-Pa.		6				x		Berlin–Hamburg	
Jatznick	V.-Greif.		6			x	x		Angermünde–Stralsund; Jatznick–Ueckermünde	
Jeeser	V.-Rügen		6				x		Angermünde–Stralsund	
Kalsow	Nwmeck.		6			x			Wismar–Rostock	
Kargow	M. Seenpl.		6				x		Neustrelitz–Warnemünde; Parchim–Neubrandenburg	
Karlsburg	V.-Greif.						x		Züssow–Wolgast Hafen	Owner: UBB
Karlshagen	V.-Greif.						x		Zinnowitz–Peenemünde	Owner: UBB
Karow (Meckl)	Lu.-Pa.		6				x		Parchim–Neubrandenburg	
Kavelstorf	Rost.-d	VVW	6				x		Neustrelitz–Warnemünde	
Kenz	V.-Rügen						x		Velgast–Barth	Owner: UBB
Kirch-Jesar	Lu.-Pa.		6				x		Hagenow Land–Holthusen	
Kleeth	M. Seenpl.		6			x			Bützow–Szczecin	
Klein Bünzow	V.-Greif.		6			x			Angermünde–Stralsund	
Klockow (b Waren/Müritz)	M. Seenpl.		6				x		Neustrelitz–Warnemünde	
Kölpinsee	V.-Greif.						x		Ducherow–Wolgaster Fähre	Owner: UBB
Koserow	V.-Greif.						x		Ducherow–Wolgaster Fähre	Owner: UBB
Kratzeburg	M. Seenpl.		6				x		Neustrelitz–Warnemünde	
Kronskamp	Rost.-d	VVW	6			x	x		Neustrelitz–Warnemünde	
Kröpelin	Rost.-d	VVW	6			x			Wismar–Rostock	
Kummerow (b Stralsund)	V.-Rügen		6				x		Rostock–Stralsund	
Laage (Meckl)	Rost.-d	VVW	6				x		Neustrelitz–Warnemünde	
Langhagen	Rost.-d	VVW	7			x	x		Neustrelitz–Warnemünde	
Lalendorf	Rost.-d	VVW	6			x	x		Bützow–Szczecin; Neustrelitz–Warnemünde	
Lancken	V.-Rügen		6			x			Stralsund–Sassnitz	
Lauterbach (Rügen)	V.-Rügen		6				x		Bergen auf Rügen–Lauterbach Mole	Three-rail; 750 + 1435 mm
Lauterbach Mole	V.-Rügen		6				x		Bergen auf Rügen–Lauterbach Mole	Three-rail; 750 + 1435 mm
Lietzow (Rügen)	V.-Rügen		5			x			Lietzow–Binz; Stralsund–Sassnitz	
Löcknitz	V.-Greif.		6			x			Bützow–Szczecin	
Lüblow (Meckl)	Lu.-Pa.		6			x			Ludwigslust–Wismar	
Lübstorf	Nwmeck.		6			x			Ludwigslust–Wismar	
Lübz	Lu.-Pa.		6				x		Parchim–Neubrandenburg	
Lüdersdorf (Meckl)	Nwmeck.		6			x			Lübeck–Bad Kleinen	
Ludwigslust	Lu.-Pa.		3	x	x	x	x		Berlin–Hamburg; Ludwigslust–Wismar; Parchim–Ludwigslust	
Lüssow (Meckl)	Rost.-d	VVW	6					x	Güstrow–Schwaan	
Lützow	Nwmeck.		6				x		Schwerin–Rehna	
Malchin	M. Seenpl.		6			x	x		Bützow–Szczecin	
Malchow Krebssee	M. Seenpl.						x		Parchim–Neubrandenburg	
Martensdorf	V.-Rügen		6			x	x		Rostock–Stralsund	
Mierendorf	Rost.-d	VVW	6				x		Priemerburg–Plaaz	
Miltzow	V.-Rügen		6			x	x		Angermünde–Stralsund	
Mirow	M. Seenpl.		6				x		Wittenberge–Strasburg	
Mistorf	Rost.-d	VVW	6					x	Güstrow–Schwaan	
Moidentin	Nwmeck.		6			x			Ludwigslust–Wismar	
Mölln (Meckl)	M. Seenpl.		6				x		Bützow–Szczecin	
Mönchhagen	Rost.-d	VVW	6				x		Rostock–Stralsund	
Neetzka	M. Seenpl.		6			x	x		Bützow–Szczecin	
Neu Pudagla	V.-Greif.								Ducherow–Wolgaster Fähre	
Neu Wokern	Rost.-d	VVW	6			x	x		Bützow–Szczecin	
Neubrandenburg	M. Seenpl.		5			x	x		Berlin–Stralsund; Bützow–Szczecin	
Neubukow	Rost.-d	VVW	6			x			Wismar–Rostock	
Neustadt-Glewe	Lu.-Pa.		6				x		Parchim–Ludwigslust	
Neustrelitz Hbf	M. Seenpl.		5	x	x	x	x		Berlin–Stralsund; Neustrelitz–Warnemünde; Wittenberge–Strasburg	
Nossentin	M. Seenpl.		6				x		Parchim–Neubrandenburg	
Oertzenhof	M. Seenpl.		6			x	x		Bützow–Szczecin	
Ostseebad Binz	V.-Rügen		3		x	x			Lietzow–Binz	
Ostseebad Kühlungsborn Mitte	Rost.-d	VVW					x		Bad Doberan–Kühlungsborn	Owner: MBB; 900 mm
Ostseebad Kühlungsborn Ost	Rost.-d	VVW					x		Bad Doberan–Kühlungsborn	Owner: MBB; 900 mm
Ostseebad Kühlungsborn West	Rost.-d	VVW					x		Bad Doberan–Kühlungsborn	Owner: MBB; 900 mm
Papendorf	Rost.-d	VVW	6					x	Bad Kleinen–Rostock	
Parchim	Lu.-Pa.		5				x		Parchim–Ludwigslust; Schwerin–Parchim; Parchim–Neubrandenburg	
Parkentin	Rost.-d	VVW	6			x	x		Wismar–Rostock	
Pasewalk	V.-Greif.		3		x	x	x		Angermünde–Stralsund; Bützow–Szczecin	
Pasewalk Ost	V.-Greif.		6			x			Bützow–Szczecin	
Passow (Meckl)	Lu.-Pa.		6				x		Parchim–Neubrandenburg	
Peenemünde	V.-Greif.						x		Zinnowitz–Peenemünde	Owner: UBB
Petersdorf (Meckl)	Nwmeck.		6			x			Ludwigslust–Wismar	
Philippshagen	V.-Rügen						x		Göhren–Lauterbach Mole	Owner: RüBB; 750 mm
Plaaz	Rost.-d	VVW	6			x	x		Neustrelitz–Warnemünde; Priemerburg–Plaaz	
Plate (Meckl)	Lu.-Pa.		6				x		Schwerin–Parchim	
Plau am See	Lu.-Pa.						x		Meyenburg–Güstrow	
Plüschow	Nwmeck.		6			x			Lübeck–Bad Kleinen	
Pölchow	Rost.-d	VVW	6					x	Bad Kleinen–Rostock	
Posewald	V.-Rügen						x		Göhren–Lauterbach Mole	Owner: RüBB; 750 mm
Priemerburg	Rost.-d	VVW	6			x	x		Bützow–Szczecin; Priemerburg–Plaaz	
Prora	V.-Rügen		6			x			Lietzow–Binz	
Prora Ost	V.-Rügen		6			x			Lietzow–Binz	
Pritzier	Lu.-Pa.		6			x			Berlin–Hamburg	
Putbus	V.-Rügen		6				x		Bergen auf Rügen–Lauterbach Mole; Göhren–Altefähr	two rail gauges 750 + 1435 mm
Rakow	V.-Rügen		6			x	x		Berlin–Stralsund	
Rambin (Rügen)	V.-Rügen		6			x			Stralsund–Sassnitz	
Rastow	Lu.-Pa.		6			x			Ludwigslust–Wismar	
Reddelich	Rost.-d	VVW	6			x			Wismar–Rostock	
Rehna	Nwmeck.		6				x		Schwerin–Rehna	
Reuterstadt Stavenhagen	M. Seenpl.		6			x	x		Bützow–Szczecin	
Ribnitz-Damgarten Ost	V.-Rügen		6			x			Rostock–Stralsund	
Ribnitz-Damgarten West	V.-Rügen		3		x	x			Rostock–Stralsund	
Roggentin	Rost.-d	VVW	6			x			Rostock–Tessin	
Rostock Hbf	Rost.-c	VVW	2	x	x	x	x	x	Neustrelitz–Warnemünde; Rostock–Stralsund; Rostock–Tessin; Wismar–Rostock	
Rostock Hinrichsdorfer Straße	Rost.-c	VVW	6					x	Kavelstorf–Rostock Seehafen Nord	
Rostock Holbeinplatz	Rost.-c	VVW	4					x	Neustrelitz–Warnemünde	
Rostock Parkstraße	Rost.-c	VVW	4					x	Neustrelitz–Warnemünde	
Rostock Seehafen Nord	Rost.-c	VVW	6					x	Kavelstorf–Rostock Seehafen Nord	
Rostock Thierfelder Straße	Rost.-c	VVW	6			x			Wismar–Rostock	
Rostock-Torfbrücke	Rost.-c	VVW	6				x		Rövershagen–Graal-Müritz	
Rostock-Bramow	Rost.-c	VVW	4					x	Neustrelitz–Warnemünde	
Rostock-Dierkow	Rost.-c	VVW	6					x	Kavelstorf–Rostock Seehafen Nord	
Rostock-Evershagen	Rost.-c	VVW	4					x	Neustrelitz–Warnemünde	
Rostock-Kassebohm	Rost.-c	VVW	6				x	x	Rostock–Stralsund	
Rostock-Lichtenhagen	Rost.-c	VVW	4					x	Neustrelitz–Warnemünde	
Rostock-Lütten Klein	Rost.-c	VVW	4					x	Neustrelitz–Warnemünde	
Rostock-Marienehe	Rost.-c	VVW	4					x	Neustrelitz–Warnemünde	
Rostock-Toitenwinkel	Rost.-c	VVW	6					x	Kavelstorf–Rostock Seehafen Nord	
Rövershagen	Rost.-d	VVW	5			x	x		Rostock–Stralsund; Rövershagen–Graal-Müritz	
Rövershagen Karls Erlebnisdorf	Rost.-d	VVW					x		Rostock–Stralsund	
Ruthenbeck	Lu.-Pa.		6				x		Schwerin–Parchim	
Saatel	V.-Rügen						x		Velgast–Barth	Owner: UBB
Sagard	V.-Rügen		6			x			Stralsund–Sassnitz	
Samtens	V.-Rügen		6			x			Stralsund–Sassnitz	
Sandförde	V.-Greif.		6				x		Angermünde–Stralsund	
Sandhagen (b Bad Doberan)	Rost.-d	VVW	6			x			Wismar–Rostock	
Sanitz (b Rostock)	Rost.-d	VVW	6			x			Rostock–Tessin	
Sassnitz	V.-Rügen		6			x			Stralsund–Sassnitz	
Sassnitz Fährhafen	V.-Rügen						x		Stralsund–Sassnitz	
Scharstorf	Rost.-d	VVW	6				x		Neustrelitz–Warnemünde	
Schmollensee	V.-Greif.						x		Ducherow–Wolgaster Fähre	Owner: UBB
Schönberg (Meckl)	Nwmeck.		6			x			Lübeck–Bad Kleinen	
Schwaan	Rost.-d	VVW	5			x		x	Bad Kleinen–Rostock	
Schwanheide	Lu.-Pa.		6			x			Berlin–Hamburg	
Schwenzin	M. Seenpl.		6				x		Parchim–Neubrandenburg	
Schwerin Hbf	Schwerin		3		x	x	x		Ludwigslust–Wismar; Schwerin–Rehna	
Schwerin Mitte	Schwerin		5			x	x		Ludwigslust–Wismar	
Schwerin Süd	Schwerin		5			x	x		Ludwigslust–Wismar	
Schwerin-Görries	Schwerin		6				x		Ludwigslust–Wismar; Schwerin–Parchim	
Schwerin-Lankow	Schwerin		6				x		Schwerin–Rehna	
Schwerin-Margaretenhof	Schwerin		6				x		Schwerin–Rehna	
Schwerin-Warnitz	Schwerin		6				x		Schwerin–Rehna	
Schwerin-Wüstmark	Schwerin		6				x		Schwerin–Parchim	
Seebad Ahlbeck	V.-Greif.						x		Ducherow–Wolgaster Fähre	Owner: UBB
Seebad Heringsdorf	V.-Greif.				x		x		Ducherow–Wolgaster Fähre	Owner: UBB
Seelvitz	V.-Rügen						x		Göhren–Lauterbach Mole	Owner: RüBB; 750 mm
Sellin Ost	V.-Rügen						x		Göhren–Lauterbach Mole	Owner: RüBB; 750 mm
Sellin West	V.-Rügen						x		Göhren–Lauterbach Mole	Owner: RüBB; 750 mm
Serams	V.-Rügen						x		Göhren–Lauterbach Mole	Owner: RüBB; 750 mm
Sponholz	M. Seenpl.		6			x	x		Bützow–Szczecin	
Spornitz	Lu.-Pa.		6				x		Parchim–Ludwigslust	
Steilküste/Wittebeck	Rost.-d	VVW					x		Bad Doberan–Kühlungsborn	Owner: MBB; 900 mm
Steinhausen-Neuburg	Nwmeck.		6			x			Wismar–Rostock	
Sternfeld	M. Seenpl.		6			x	x		Berlin–Stralsund	
Stralsund Hbf	V.-Rügen		3		x	x	x		Angermünde–Stralsund; Berlin–Stralsund; Rostock–Stralsund; Stralsund–Sassnitz	
Stralsund Rügendamm	V.-Rügen		6			x			Stralsund–Sassnitz	
Stralsund-Grünhufe	V.-Rügen		6			x	x		Rostock–Stralsund	
Strasburg (Uckerm)	V.-Greif.		6			x	x		Bützow–Szczecin	
Strohkirchen	Lu.-Pa.		6				x		Berlin–Hamburg	
Stubbenfelde	V.-Greif.						x		Ducherow–Wolgaster Fähre	Owner: UBB
Subzin-Liessow	Rost.-d	VVW	6				x		Neustrelitz–Warnemünde	
Sukow (b Schwerin)	Lu.-Pa.		6				x		Schwerin–Parchim	
Sülstorf	Lu.-Pa.		6			x			Ludwigslust–Wismar	
Teschenhagen	V.-Rügen		6			x			Stralsund–Sassnitz	
Teschow	Rost.-d	VVW	6			x			Wismar–Rostock	
Tessin	Rost.-d	VVW	6			x			Rostock–Tessin	
Tessin West	Rost.-d	VVW	7			x			Rostock–Tessin	
Teterow	Rost.-d	VVW	6			x	x		Bützow–Szczecin	
Torgelow	V.-Greif.		6				x		Jatznick–Ueckermünde	
Trassenheide	V.-Greif.						x		Ducherow–Wolgaster Fähre	Owner: UBB
Trassenmoor	V.-Greif.						x		Zinnowitz–Peenemünde	Owner: UBB
Ückeritz	V.-Greif.						x		Ducherow–Wolgaster Fähre	Owner: UBB
Ueckermünde	V.-Greif.		7				x		Jatznick–Ueckermünde	
Ueckermünde-Stadthafen	V.-Greif.		7				x		Jatznick–Ueckermünde	
Utzedel	M. Seenpl.		6			x	x		Berlin–Stralsund	
Velgast	V.-Rügen		5	x	x	x	x		Rostock–Stralsund; Velgast–Barth	
Ventschow	Nwmeck.		6			x			Bad Kleinen–Rostock	
Waren (Müritz)	M. Seenpl.		5	x	x	x	x		Neustrelitz–Warnemünde; Parchim–Neubrandenburg	
Warenshof	M. Seenpl.		6				x		Parchim–Neubrandenburg	
Warnemünde	Rost.-c	VVW	3	x	x			x	Neustrelitz–Warnemünde	
Warnemünde Werft	Rost.-c	VVW	4					x	Neustrelitz–Warnemünde	
Wesenberg	M. Seenpl.		6				x		Wittenberge–Strasburg	
Weißer See	M. Seenpl.						x		Wittenberge–Strasburg	
Wismar	Nwmeck.		5			x			Ludwigslust–Wismar; Wismar–Rostock	
Wittenhagen	V.-Rügen		6			x	x		Berlin–Stralsund	
Wolgast	V.-Greif.						x		Züssow–Wolgast Hafen	Owner: UBB
Wolgast Hafen	V.-Greif.						x		Züssow–Wolgast Hafen	Owner: UBB
Wolgaster Fähre	V.-Greif.						x		Ducherow–Wolgaster Fähre	Owner: UBB
Wüstenfelde	V.-Rügen		6				x		Angermünde–Stralsund	
Zachun	Lu.-Pa.		6				x		Hagenow Land–Holthusen	
Zarrendorf	V.-Rügen		6			x	x		Berlin–Stralsund	
Zempin	V.-Greif.						x		Ducherow–Wolgaster Fähre	Owner: UBB
Zerrenthin	V.-Greif.		6			x			Bützow–Szczecin	
Zinnowitz	V.-Greif.				x		x		Ducherow–Wolgaster Fähre; Zinnowitz–Peenemünde	Owner: UBB
Zirtow-Leussow	M. Seenpl.						x		Wittenberge–Strasburg	
Züssow	V.-Greif.		3		x	x	x		Angermünde–Stralsund; Züssow–Wolgast Hafen	

== See also ==
- List of scheduled railway routes in Germany
