= 1850 in rail transport =

This article lists events related to rail transport that occurred in 1850.

== Events ==
=== January events ===
- January – Maine Central Railroad predecessor Androscoggin and Kennebec Railroad is completed between Auburn, Maine and Waterville, Maine.

=== May events ===
- May 13 – The Mecklenburgische Eisenbahngesellschaft opens the Rostock-Bützow-Bad Kleinen and Güstrow-Bützow railway lines in northern Germany.

=== July events ===
- July 1 – Joseph Hamilton Beattie succeeds John Viret Gooch as locomotive engineer for London and South Western Railway.
- July 4 – Chile: The first section of the Copiapó-Caldera railway line – the second in South America – between Caldera and Monte Amargo is inaugurated today in honour of the nationality of William Wheelwright, the American businessman responsible for the project.

=== August events ===
- August 29 – Robert Stephenson's Royal Border Bridge for the York, Newcastle and Berwick Railway at Berwick-upon-Tweed, England is opened by Queen Victoria.

=== September events ===
- September 20 – The land grant for construction of the Illinois Central Railroad, the first railroad land grant in the United States, is approved.

=== October events ===
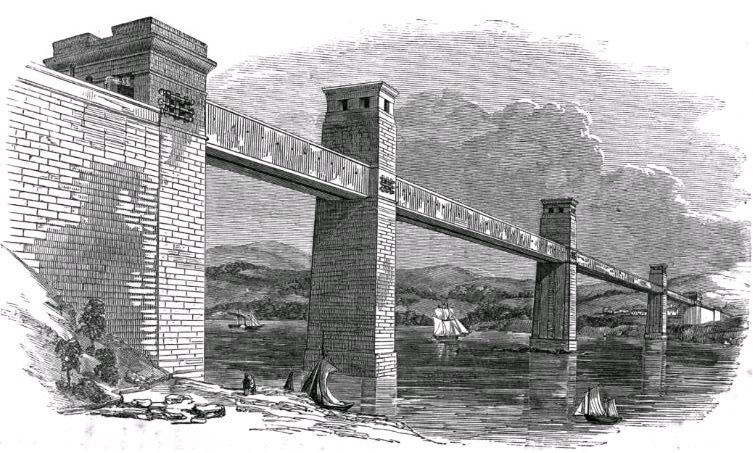
The original box section Britannia Bridge

- October 19 – Robert Stephenson's Britannia Bridge, completing the Chester and Holyhead Railway over the Menai Strait in North Wales, is opened.

=== November events ===
- November 19 – Farmers around Detroit, Michigan, burn down the Michigan Central Railroad's freight house in Detroit; the farmers were angry at the railroad's policy regarding not reimbursing them for livestock killed by trains when the stock wandered onto the tracks.
- November 20 – The first train operates on the Milwaukee, St. Paul and Pacific Railroad, a predecessor of the Milwaukee Road.

=== Unknown date events ===
- The Richmond and Danville Railroad begins operation in Virginia.
- Construction begins on the first transcontinental railroad to be completed, the Panama Railway.

== Births ==
=== February births ===
- February 27 – Henry Huntington, nephew of Collis P. Huntington and executive in charge of Pacific Electric in the early part of the 20th century (d. 1927).

=== November births ===
- November 19 – Jule Murat Hannaford, president of Northern Pacific Railway 1913–1920 (d. 1934).

== Deaths ==
=== July deaths ===
- July 7 – Timothy Hackworth, English steam locomotive builder (b. 1786).
