= Priemerburg–Plaaz railway =

Railway line in Germany

Plaaz–Priemerburg railway

Overview
- Line number: 187
- Locale: Mecklenburg-Vorpommern, Germany

Service
- Route number: 6926

Technical
- Line length: 9.7 km (6.0 mi)
- Track gauge: 1,435 mm (4 ft 8 1/2 in) standard gauge
- Electrification: 15 kV/16.7 Hz AC overhead catenary

The Priemerburg-Plaaz railway is a single-track, electrified branch line in the German state of Mecklenburg-Vorpommern.

== Route ==
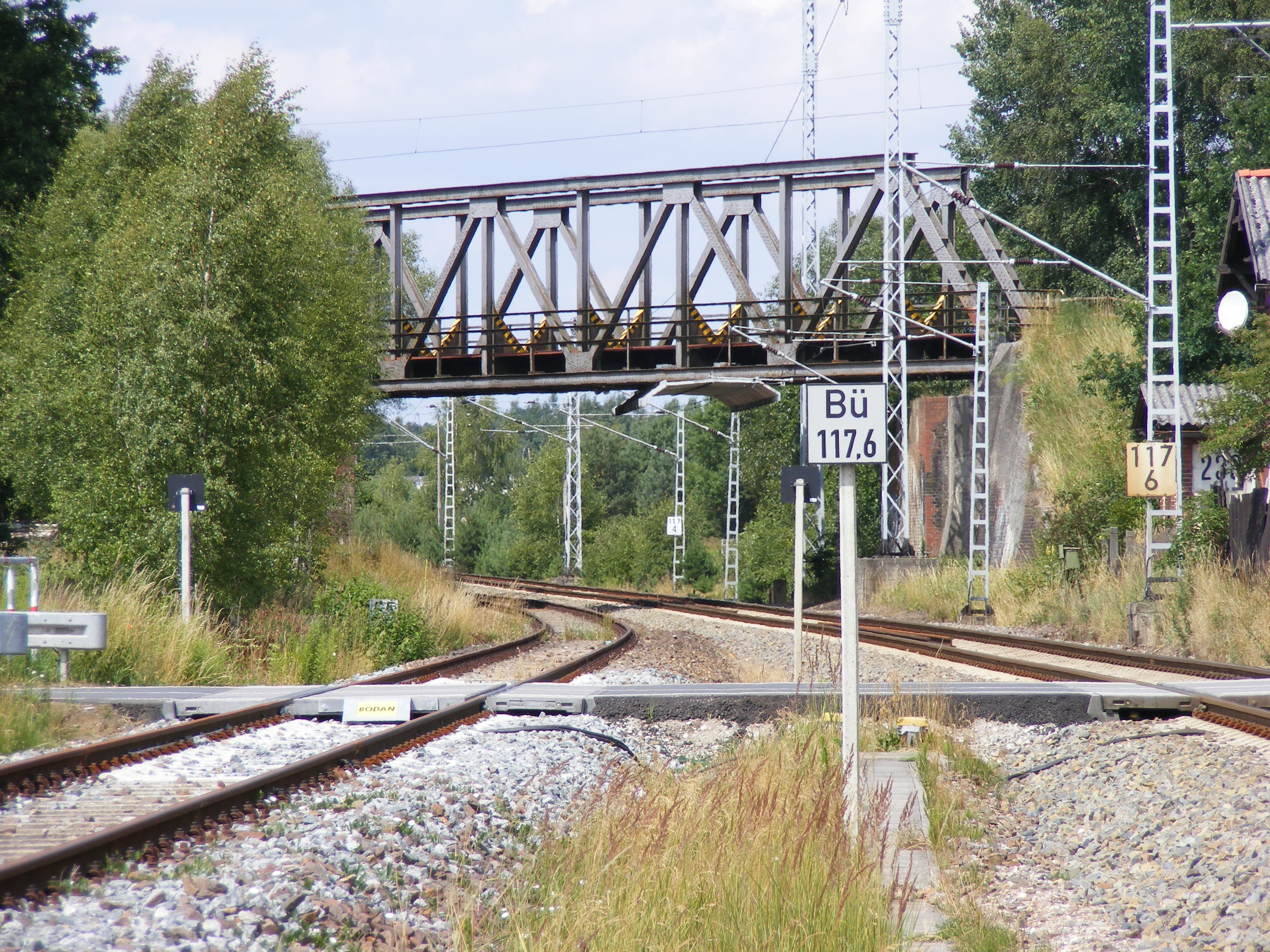
Flyover of the Priemerburg–Plaaz line over the Güstrow–Meyenburg line (left) and the Bützow–Szczecin line (right)

Like the Güstrow–Meyenburg railway, the line to Plaaz separates from the line to Neubrandenburg not in Güstrow, but three kilometres to its east in the settlement of Priemerburg. It runs to the south from the junction and then crosses the other tracks on a bridge. To the right is the route of the former connecting curve to Priemerwald Süd. After running through a wooded area, it passes through Glasewitz station, which closed in 1993 and has left few traces. The following section runs through open, rolling countryside. The now closed Mierdorf station was outside the village in an open field. Shortly afterwards, the line joins the Neustrelitz–Warnemünde railway (Lloyd Railway) to the south of Plaaz station.

== History ==
The Güstrow Plau Railway (Güstrow-Plauer Eisenbahn) opened its main line from Güstrow to Plau in 1882, which was later extended to Meyenburg. The Lloyd Railway connecting Neustrelitz and Rostock was opened in 1886, but it by-passed the town of Güstrow. Then, a nearly ten kilometre-long connection was opened to Plaaz on the Lloyd Railway by the Güstrow Plau Railway in 1887. The importance of the line was limited to local traffic, especially after 1887 when the direct connection from Güstrow to Rostock over the Güstrow–Schwaan railway went into operation.

The Güstrow Plau Railway was nationalised in 1890 and incorporated in the Friedrich-Franz Railway, which was nationalised at the same time.

The traffic in the first half of the 20th century consisted of three to four pairs of trains daily between Güstrow and Plaaz, which usually connected in Plaaz with trains on the Lloyd Railway to Rostock.

=== 1945–1990 ===
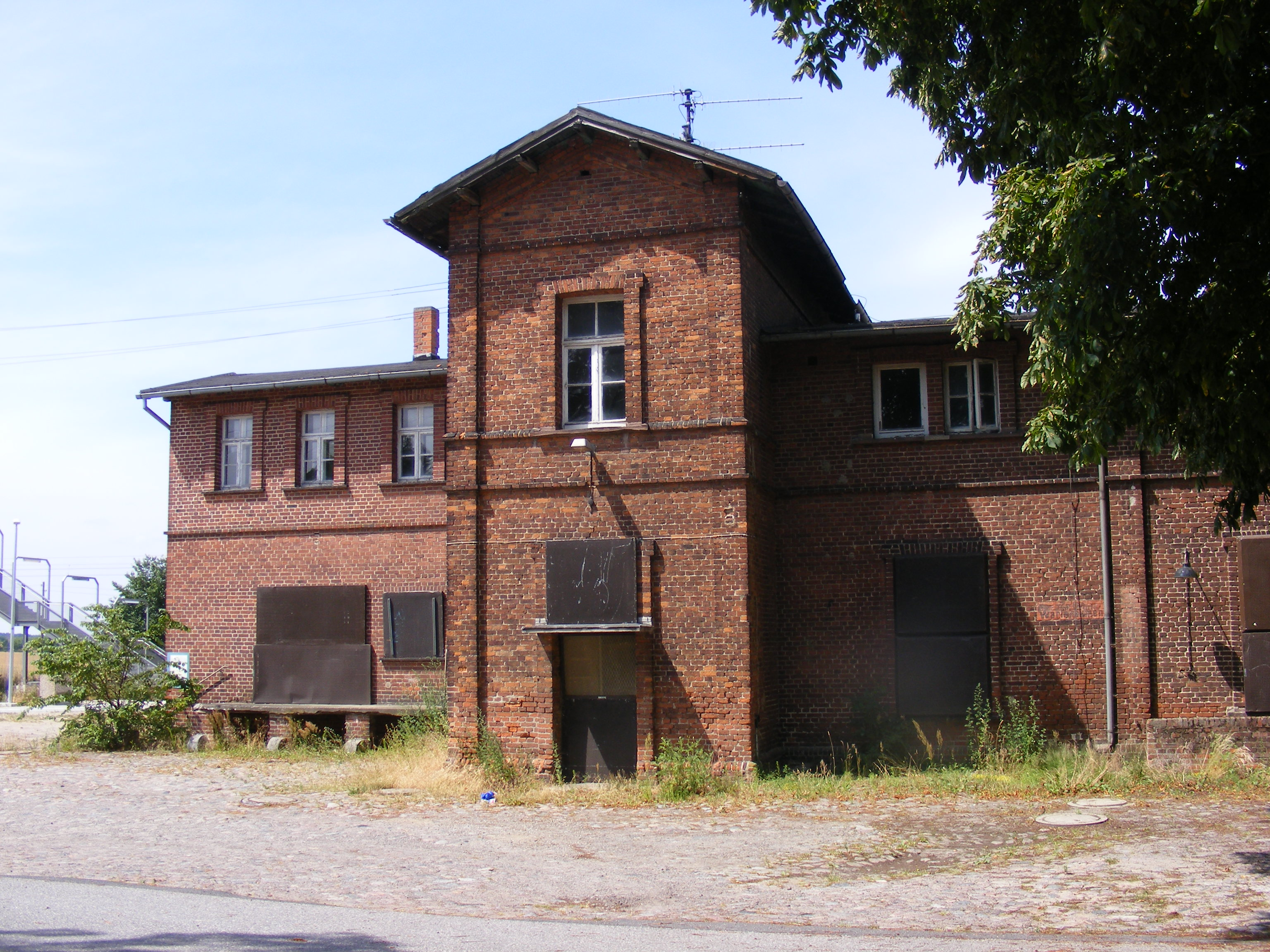
Plaaz station, July 2008

After the Second World War, the Lloyd Railway south of Plaaz was dismantled as reparations to the Soviet Union and trains ran from Güstrow via Plaaz to Rostock. This continued after the reconstruction of the Lloyd Railway. The line had additional importance in the first years after the Second World War until 1948, because it was the only connection from Rostock to the south after the Rostock–Schwaan–Bützow line was also dismantled.

The importance of the line for freight traffic grew with the construction of the new port of Rostock up to 1960. It provided a connection from Kavelstorf to the ports of Bützow and Güstrow. It was connected via a new connecting curve to the operations station of Priemerwald Süd and the lines to Neubrandenburg and Pritzwalk. This relieved the junctions of Rostock and Güstrow. The connecting curve was built with double track so that trains could cross there. The line was electrified in 1985 primarily for freight operations. The passenger traffic was limited over the years to about six pairs of trains a day on the Güstrow–Plaaz–Rostock route and the line speed remained at branch line standards.

Occasionally there were express trains on the line, such as in 1988/89 inter-zone train on the Rostock–Güstrow–Hamburg –Cologne route, which ran this way to Güstrow to avoid having to reverse.

=== Since 1990 ===
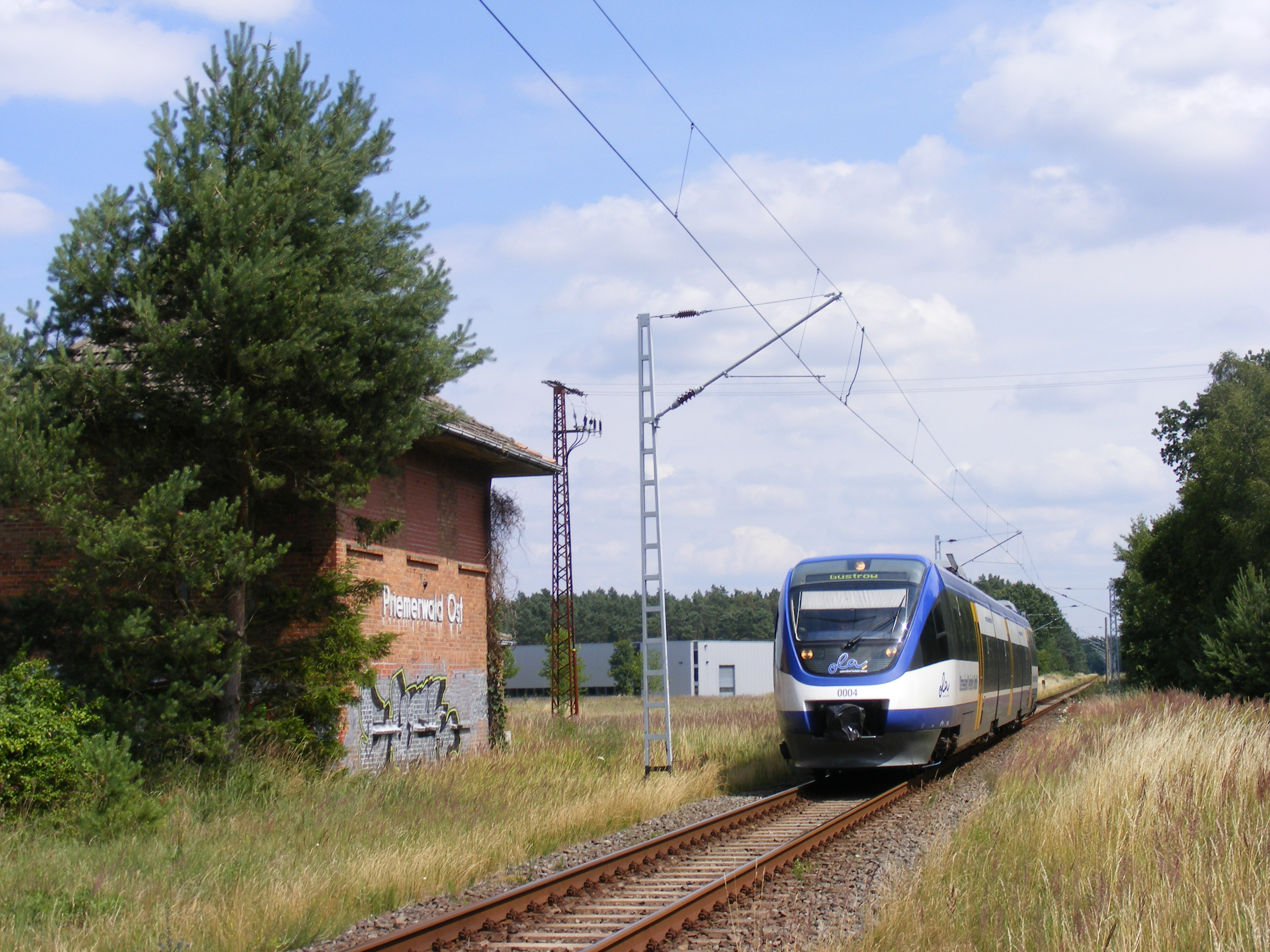
Railcar of the Ostseeland-Verkehr at the former Priemerwald Ost junction, July 2008

With the decline in freight traffic, the Priemerwald connecting curve became unnecessary and it was closed. Passenger services were harmonized in 1996 and after that trains ran every two hours. Since 2000, it has been operated as part of the Ostmecklenburgischem Eisenbahn (now Ostseeland Verkehr), part of the Veolia Verkehr group. After a year and half of closure due to the renovation of the adjoining section of the Lloyd Railway, trains have run since June 2007 between Rostock, Plaaz and Güstrow every two hours; on Monday to Friday mornings and afternoons services were hourly.

As of 9 December 2012, the line was included the Rostock S-Bahn network and since then it has been operated as part of the new line S3 (Güstrow–Rostock Hbf–Warnemünde ) every hour or, on weekends, every two hours. It is operated with Bombardier Talent railcars. Mierdorf station was abandoned from that date. Glasewitz station had already closed in the mid-1990s.
