= Güstrow–Schwaan railway =

Railway line in Germany

Overview
- Line number: 6445
- Locale: Mecklenburg-Vorpommern, Germany

Service
- Route number: KBS 182

Technical
- Line length: 17.4 km (10.8 mi)
- Track gauge: 1,435 mm (4 ft 8 1/2 in) standard gauge
- Electrification: 15 kV/16.7 Hz AC overhead
- Operating speed: 120 km/h (75 mph) (maximum)

The Güstrow–Schwaan railway is a single-track, electrified main line in the German state of Mecklenburg-Vorpommern.

== History ==
In 1850, a branch was opened from the Bad Kleinen–Rostock railway in Bützow to Güstrow. In the following years the network was further expanded, including a connection from Güstrow to Neubrandenburg opened in 1864, which was extended to Stettin (now Szczecin in Poland) in 1867. The line from Gustrow to Plau was opened in 1882. What was still missing was a direct connection between Rostock and Güstrow, the largest and the fourth largest towns in the Grand Duchy of Mecklenburg-Schwerin. The Neustrelitz–Warnemünde railway (Lloyd Railway) was put into operation in 1886, connecting Rostock with Neustrelitz and Berlin, but bypassing Güstrow. A year later, two lines between Rostock and Güstrow emerged almost simultaneously. On the one hand, the Priemerburg–Plaaz railway was built by the Güstrow Plau Railway (German: Güstrow-Plauer Eisenbahn), which provided a connection to Rostock via the Lloyd Railway. On the other hand, a state line was built by the Grand Duchy to Schwaan on the Bad Kleinen–Rostock railway. Originally the line was controlled from Schwiesow and Rukieten on the existing main lines, but by the end of the 19th century the line was controlled from local signal boxes in the stations of Güstrow and Schwaan.

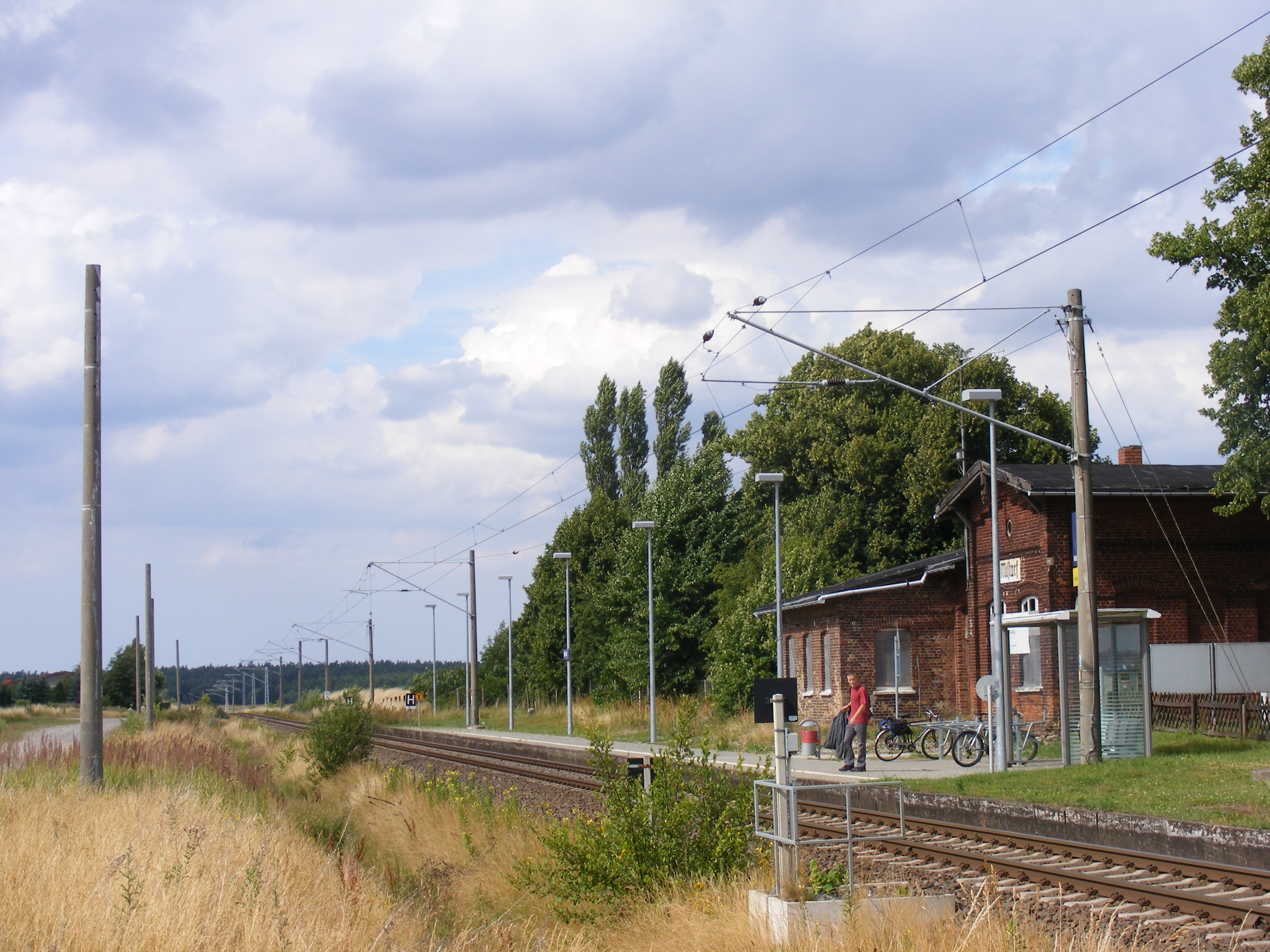
Mistorf station (July 2008). To the left is the catenary on the dismantled second track.

In addition to local traffic, the line was significant for long-distance traffic. From 1895, trains from Berlin to Rostock and Copenhagen ran via Güstrow instead of on the direct route via Plaaz on the Lloyd Railway.

After the Second World War, the Lloyd Railway south of Plaaz was dismantled as reparations to the Soviet Union. As a result, after the reconstruction in 1948 of the Schwaan–Rostock line, which had also been dismantled for reparations, the Güstrow–Schwaan line became an important route for passenger and freight traffic. The traffic between Berlin and Rostock ran via Neubrandenburg and Güstrow. The route via Karow served as an alternate route. Güstrow station was rebuilt from 1952 to 1954 because of the increased freight traffic. The first relay interlocking of the Reichsbahndirektion (railway division) of Schwerin went into operation there in 1954.

Even after the reconstruction of the Lloyd Railway in 1960, the route was particularly important for long-distance services between Rostock and Berlin with more than half of the Durchgangszug (express) trains continued to run via Güstrow. The line was electrified in May 1985.

Since 1998, local trains running between Rostock and Güstrow have been included in the Rostock S-Bahn network. In subsequent years, the line speed was raised to 120 km/h and the last crossing opportunity located in former Mistorf station was removed.

=== Current situation ===
The line is served hourly (every two hours on weekends) by line S2 of the Rostock S-Bahn (Warnemünde–Rostock Hauptbahnhof–Güstrow). Every two hours, a Regional-Express (RE5) runs on the Rostock–Berlin–Lutherstadt Wittenberg route; once a day this time slot is operated as the InterConnex service on the Warnemünde–Berlin–Leipzig route.
