= Ludwigslust–Wismar railway =

Railway line in Germany

Ludwigslust–Wismar

Overview
- Line number: 6441
- Locale: Mecklenburg-Vorpommern, Germany

Service
- Route number: 100 (Holthusen–Bad Kleinen); 202 (Ludwigslust–Wismar)

Technical
- Line length: 68.632 km (42.646 mi)
- Number of tracks: 2: Ludwigslust–Bad Kleinen
- Track gauge: 1,435 mm (4 ft 8 1/2 in) standard gauge
- Electrification: 15 kV/16.7 Hz AC overhead catenary
- Operating speed: in sections 160 km/h (99.4 mph), (maximum); mostly 120 km/h (74.6 mph) (maximum)

The Ludwigslust–Wismar railway is an electrified railway in the German state of Mecklenburg-Vorpommern. The Ludwigslust–Bad Kleinen section of the line is double track. The line was opened in 1848, by the Mecklenburg Railway Company (German: Mecklenburgische Eisenbahngesellschaft) and is one of the oldest railways in Germany.

== History ==
=== Before 1945 ===
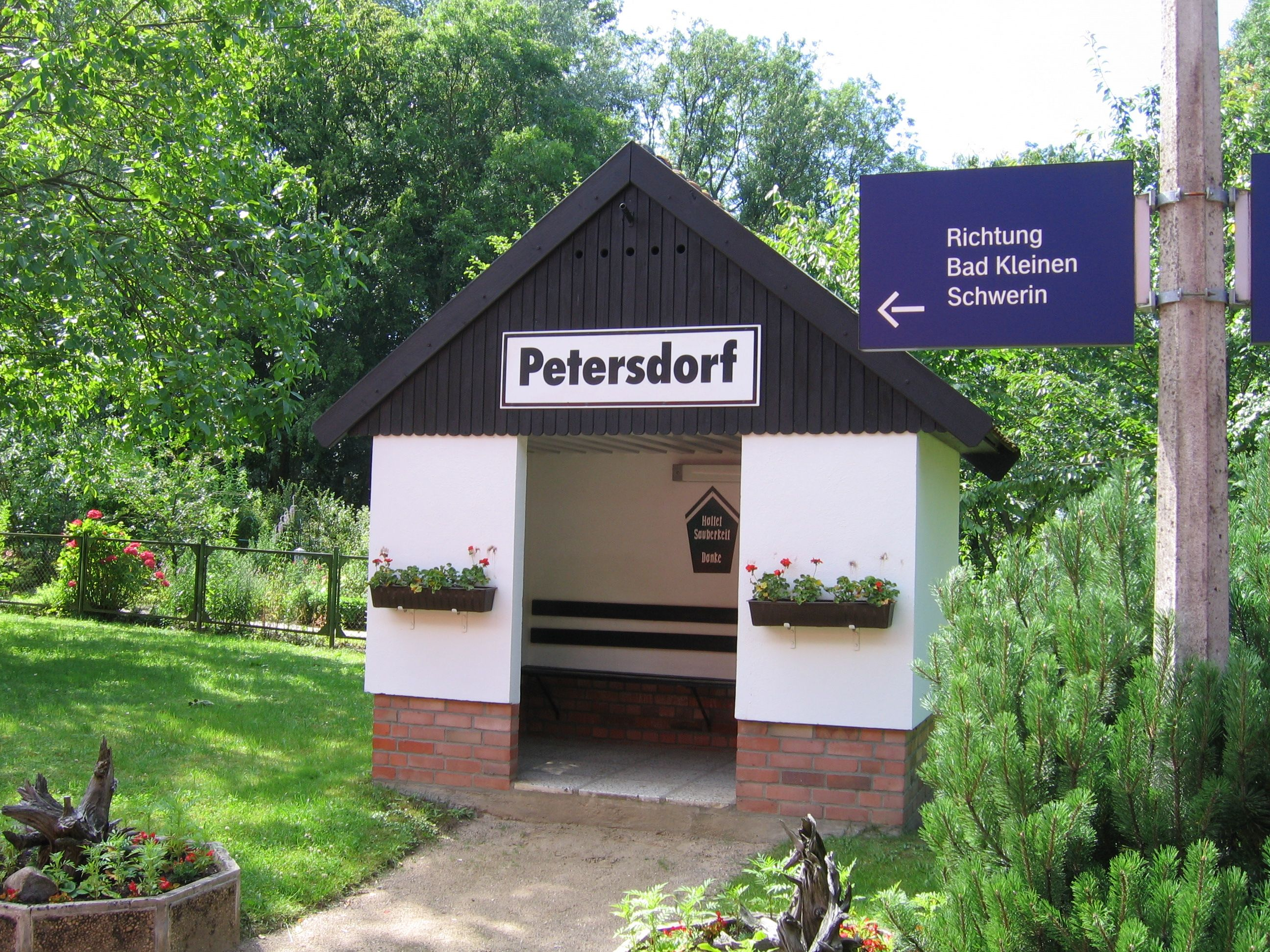
Petersdorf station

The Berlin–Hamburg line, opened in 1846, was the first railway passing through the Grand Duchy of Mecklenburg-Schwerin. Immediately afterwards Mecklenburg-Schwerin began work on a link from Hagenow to Schwerin, which was opened on 1 May 1847. On 12 July 1848, the line was extended to Wismar. In 1850, the Bad Kleinen–Rostock line was opened from Bad Kleinen station to Rostock.

In 1888 a connection was opened from Holthusen to Ludwigslust on the Berlin–Hamburg line. Trains now ran from Schwerin to Wittenberge and on to Magdeburg and Berlin on this line. Internally the railways have long considered the Ludwigslust–Wismar line as a single line, although it partially overlaps with the Hagenow Land–Schwerin line.

=== Since 1945 ===
After the Second World War the importance of the line increased. After the division of Germany the sea ports of Rostock and Wismar became more important, significantly increasing the role of the line for passenger transport. In the early 1970s, the line's second track was rebuilt; it had lost this track as part of war reparations to the Soviet Union after the Second World War.

In the late 1970s, the junction at Ludwigslust was moved north. The line now branches off a bit later from the Berlin–Hamburg line. As a result, the track's length has increased by about 500 metres.

In 1986/87 the line was electrified. At that time, the section south of Bad Kleinen was the busiest line in northern East Germany. In the summer service about 15 pairs of express trains ran from Schwerin towards Magdeburg. There were also three normal trains and a Städteexpress (“city express”) train from Schwerin to Berlin, plus some extra services at weekends.

=== Since 1990 ===
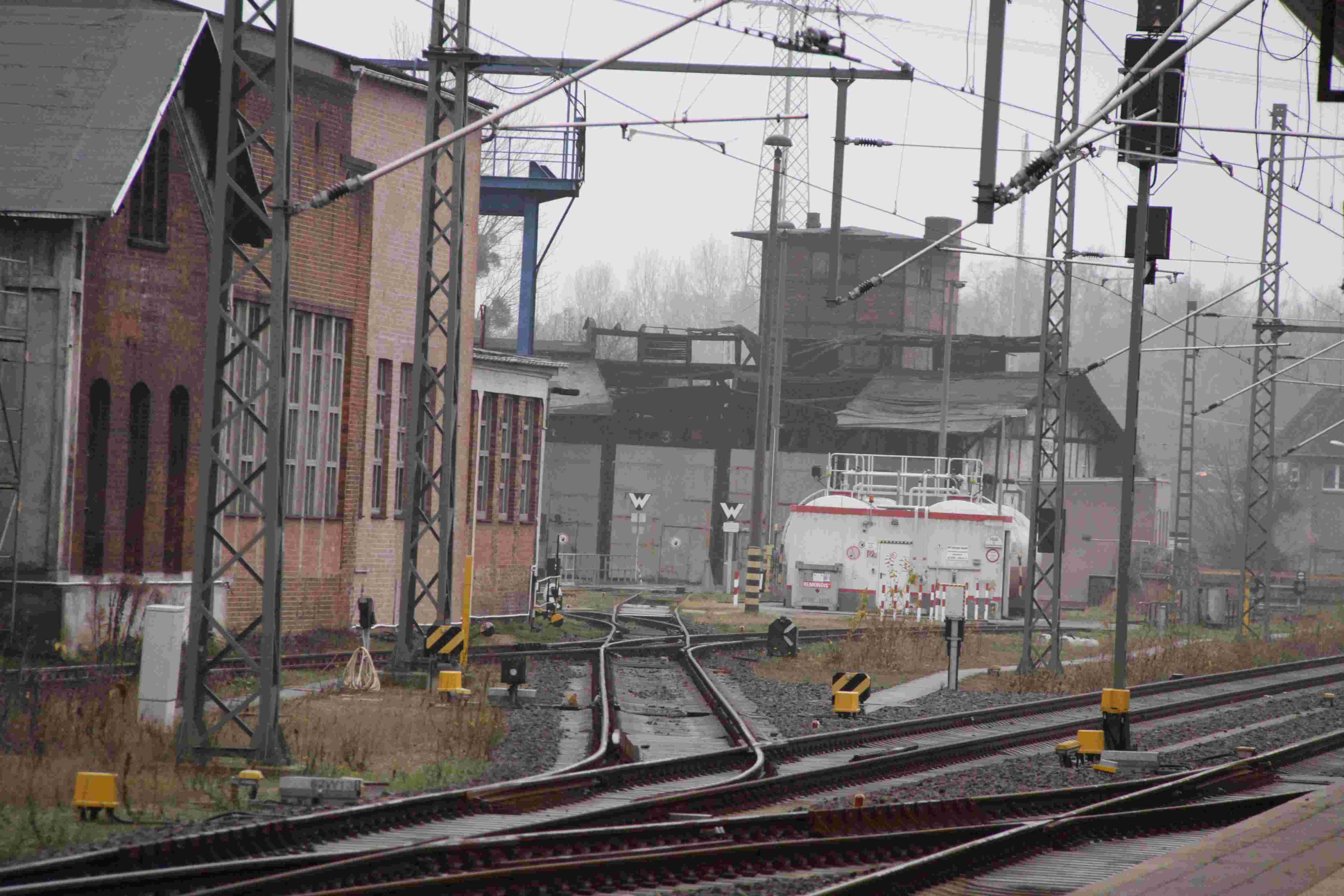
The former locomotive depot is now part of the Mecklenburg Railway and Technology Museum

In the wake of German reunification, there was a shift in traffic flows from the north–south to the east–west direction. In addition, since the second half of the 1990s trains run between Rostock and Hamburg via Schwerin, which previously went via Lübeck. Parts of the track have been modernised for maximum speeds of up to 160 km/h as part of German Unity Transport Project No. 1. However, the upgrade has taken place so far only in the section from Holthusen to Carlshöhe.

In the spring of 2001, the new Schwerin Mitte station was opened nearer the centre of Schwerin. At the same time a continuous Regional-Express line to Berlin was established.

From 2002 to 2005, the Schwerin Hauptbahnhof was modernised, including the lengthening of the platforms on tracks 2 and 3. Similarly, the bridge over Obotritenring (the ring road) was rebuilt. The locomotive depot was taken out of service and now accommodates the Mecklenburg Railway and Technology Museum. The former Schwerin freight yard was closed. Parts of it are now used for parking passenger trains.

== Current operations ==
The line is served by Regional-Express trains on the Wismar–Ludwigslust every hour. On the Bad Kleinen–Schwerin–Holthusen section, it is also served every the two hours by InterCity trains on the (Binz–) Stralsund–Rostock–Schwerin–Hamburg route and continuing to western or south western Germany and Regional-Express trains on the Rostock–Hamburg route. Individual shuttle trains, branded as the Fliegender Schweriner (“Flying Schweriner”), run between Schwerin and Ludwigslust and there are connections to long-distance trains towards Berlin. In summer there is an InterCity train on the Rostock–Bad Kleinen–Schwerin–Ludwiglust–Leipzig route.
