= Mecklenburg Railway Company =

The Mecklenburg Railway Company (German: Mecklenburgische Eisenbahngesellschaft) was founded in 1845 to build a railway line from Hagenow to Rostock and to Güstrow, now in the German state of Mecklenburg-Vorpommern. It was nationalised in 1873 and combined with the Grand Duchy of Mecklenburg Friedrich-Franz Railway.

== History ==
The planning of the Prussian Berlin–Hamburg line from 1841 inspired the Grand Duchy of Mecklenburg-Schwerin to develop projects for its own network. On 25 February 1846, three companies founded in the previous year, the Schwerin-Wismar Railway Company (Schwerin-Wismarsche Eisenbahn-Gesellschaft), the Hagenow-Schwerin-Rostock Railway Company (Hagenow-Schwerin-Rostocker Eisenbahn-Gesellschaft) and the Güstrow-Bützow Railway Company (Güstrow-Bützower Eisenbahn-Gesellschaft), combined to form the Mecklenburg Railway Company. On 10 March 1846 the Company received a concession to build a railway from Hagenow via Schwerin to Wismar as well as from Bad Kleinen via Bützow to Rostock and Güstrow.

On 1 May 1847, the section between Hagenow and Schwerin was put into operation. On 12 July 1848, the line to Wismar was completed. Finally, on 13 May 1850, the lines to Rostock and to Güstrow were opened.
