= Hagenow Land–Schwerin railway =

Railway line in Germany

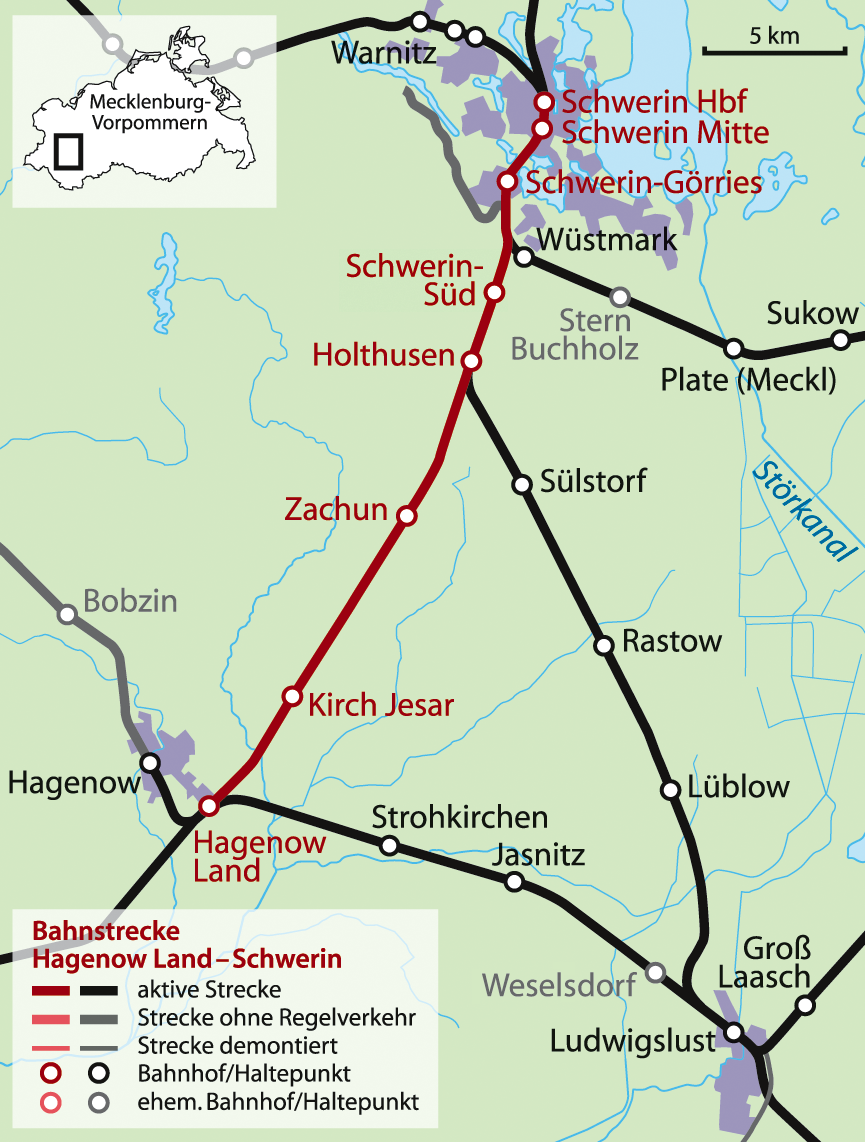

Overview
- Line number: Hagenow-Holthusen: 6442; Holthusen-Schwerin: 6441
- Locale: Mecklenburg-Vorpommern, Germany

Service
- Route number: 100

Technical
- Line length: 38.6 km (24.0 mi)
- Track gauge: 1,435 mm (4 ft 8 1/2 in) standard gauge
- Electrification: 15 kV/16.7 Hz AC overhead catenary
- Operating speed: Hagenow–Schwerin Mitte: 160 km (99 mi) max.

The Hagenow–Schwerin railway is a double track electrified mainline railway in the German state of Mecklenburg-Vorpommern. It is the second oldest railway in Mecklenburg after the Berlin-Hamburg railway and one of the oldest railways in Germany, opened in 1847 by the Mecklenburg Railway Company (German: Mecklenburgische Eisenbahngesellschaft).

== Route ==
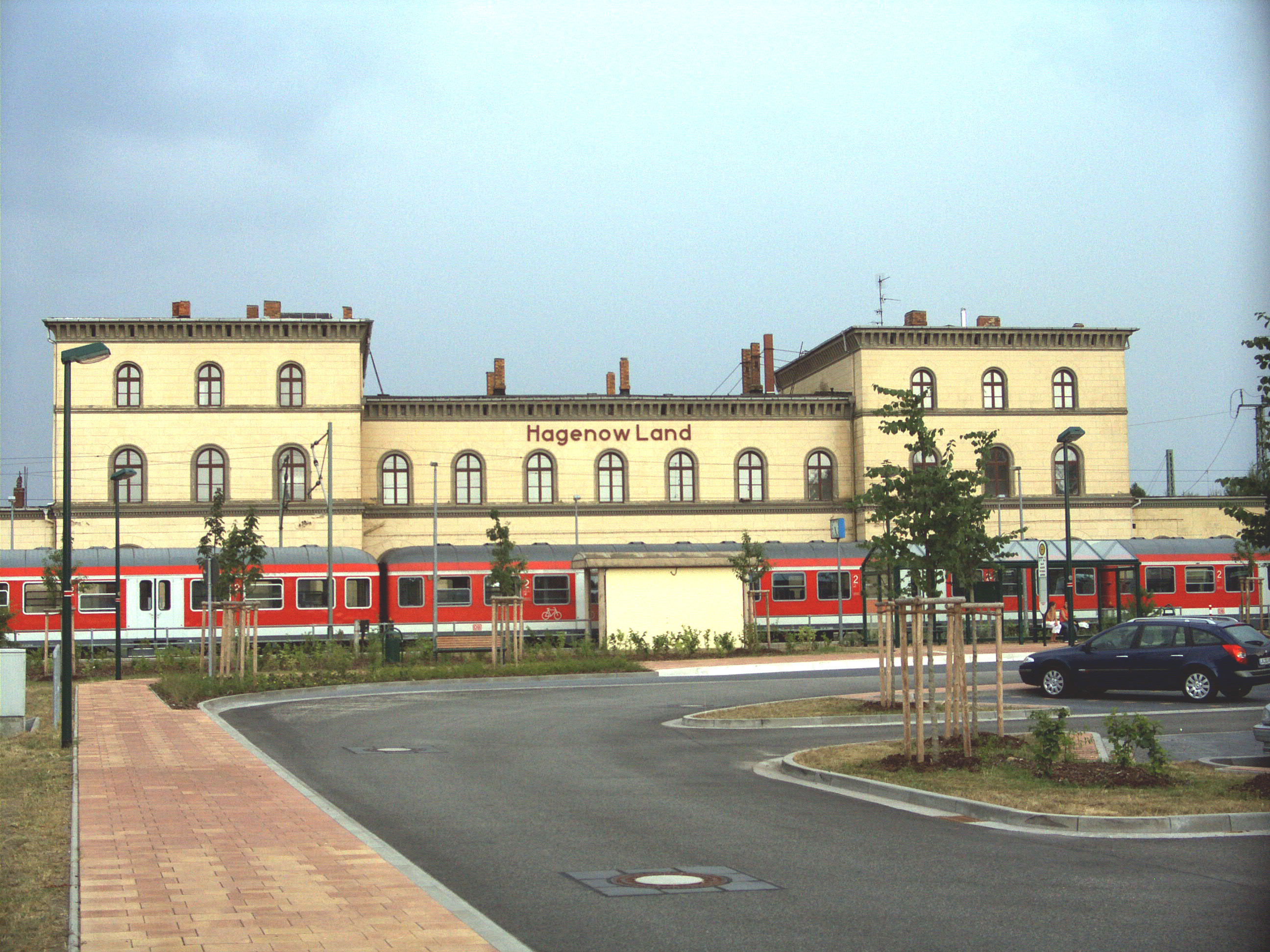
Hagenow Land station

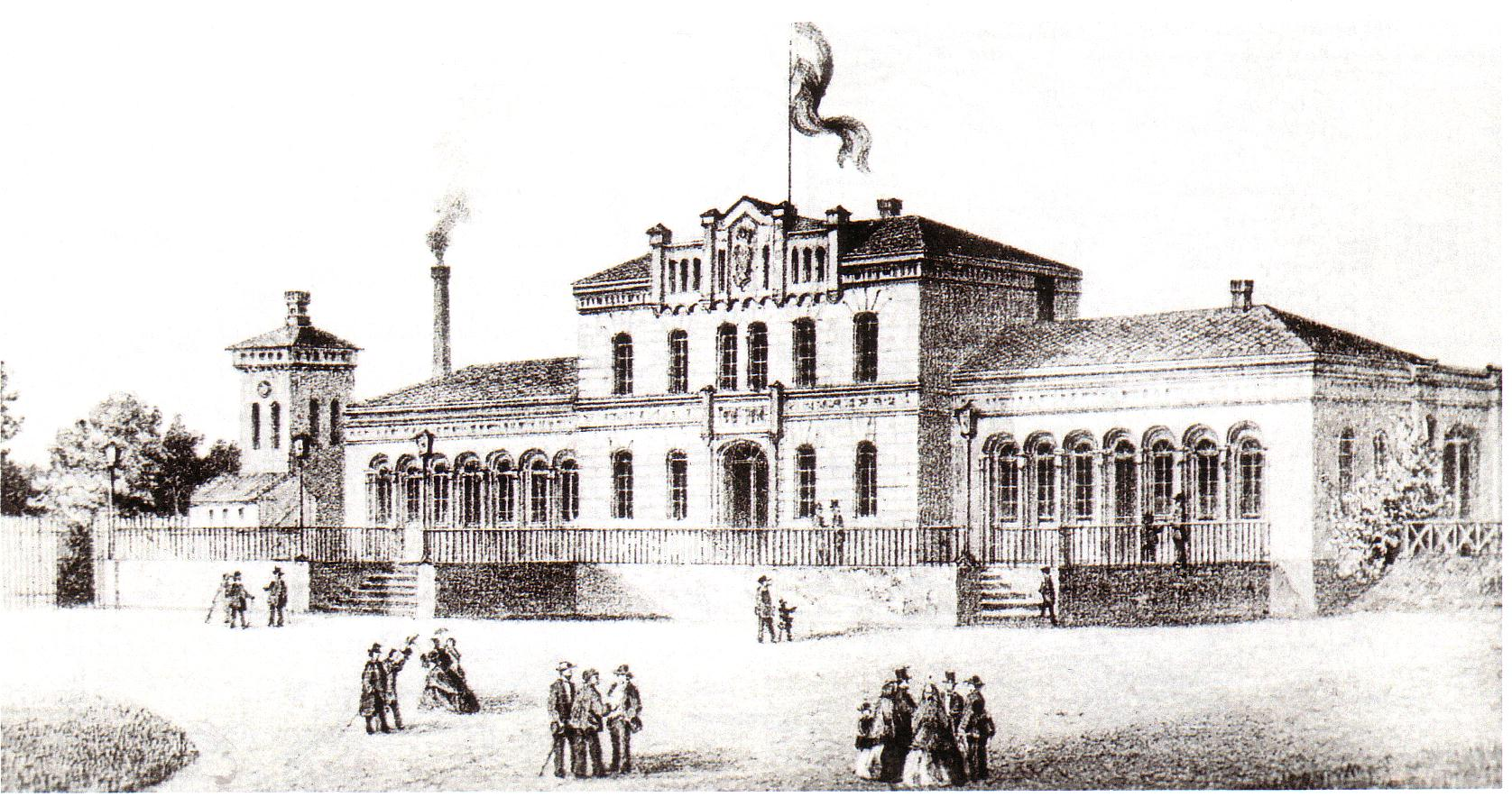
First station building in Schwerin 1847

The line runs in an almost straight line from Hagenow Land station (east of the town of Hagenow) northeast through wooded areas to Schwerin. From Holthusen, where the line from Ludwigslust joins, it runs almost due north towards Schwerin. Before Schwerin-Görries the line from Parchim connects. The railway crosses Schwerin in a cutting.

== History ==
The Berlin–Hamburg line, opened in 1846, was the first railway passing through the Grand Duchy of Mecklenburg-Schwerin. Immediately afterwards Mecklenburg-Schwerin began work on a link from Hagenow to Schwerin, which was opened on 1 May 1847. In the following years the line was extended to Wismar, Rostock and Güstrow.

Initially, two pairs of trains a day ran between Rostock and Hagenow with connections to services to Wismar and Güstrow. The construction of additional railway lines decreased the importance of this route. The Lübeck–Bad Kleinen line, which opened in 1870, diverted traffic to Hamburg via Lübeck. The opening of the Ludwiglust–Holthusen line in 1888, diverted traffic towards Berlin and Magdeburg from the section of line south of Holthusen and it was subsequently mainly used for local traffic. For example, in 1905 there were five pairs of passenger train between Hagenow Land station and Schwerin and six in 1934, some continiong to Wismar. In the 1980s there were four pairs of trains, which continued to the border station of Schwanheide. Added to this was a pair of express trains and one interzonal train (travelling between East and West Germany) between Berlin and Hamburg.

In 1996, the line was duplicated and electrified as a German Unity Transport Project and upgraded to allow a top speed of 160 km/h. The 18 km section from Hagenow Land to Holthusen was doubled and electrified. Holthusen station was rebuilt so that trains from Hagenow Land towards Schwerin could run at 160 km/h and from Ludwigslust at 130 km/h. The platforms at Schwerin Hauptbahnhof were extended and equipped with an electronic interlocking, from which the section from Hagenow Land to Bad Kleinen is controlled. The upgraded section went into operation in 1996. As a result, the travel time from Rostock via Hagenow to Hamburg is now shorter than that via Lübeck.

== Current operations ==
The line is served by Regional-Express trains on the Rostock–Hamburg route (branded as Hanse-Express) every two hours with some extra services in the peak. It is also served every the two hours by InterCity trains on the (Binz–) Stralsund–Rostock–Schwerin–Hamburg route and continuing to western or south western Germany. Regionalbahn trains used to run between Schwerin and Hagenow Land station, connecting to Hagenow Stadt, but were canceled at the timetable change in December 2012 by the state of Mecklenburg-Vorpommern as part of major austerity measures. Since then, the Kirch Jesar and Zachun have been served only irregularly by extra peak hour services on the RE 1 line.
