= Jeeser station =

Railway station in Germany

Jeeser
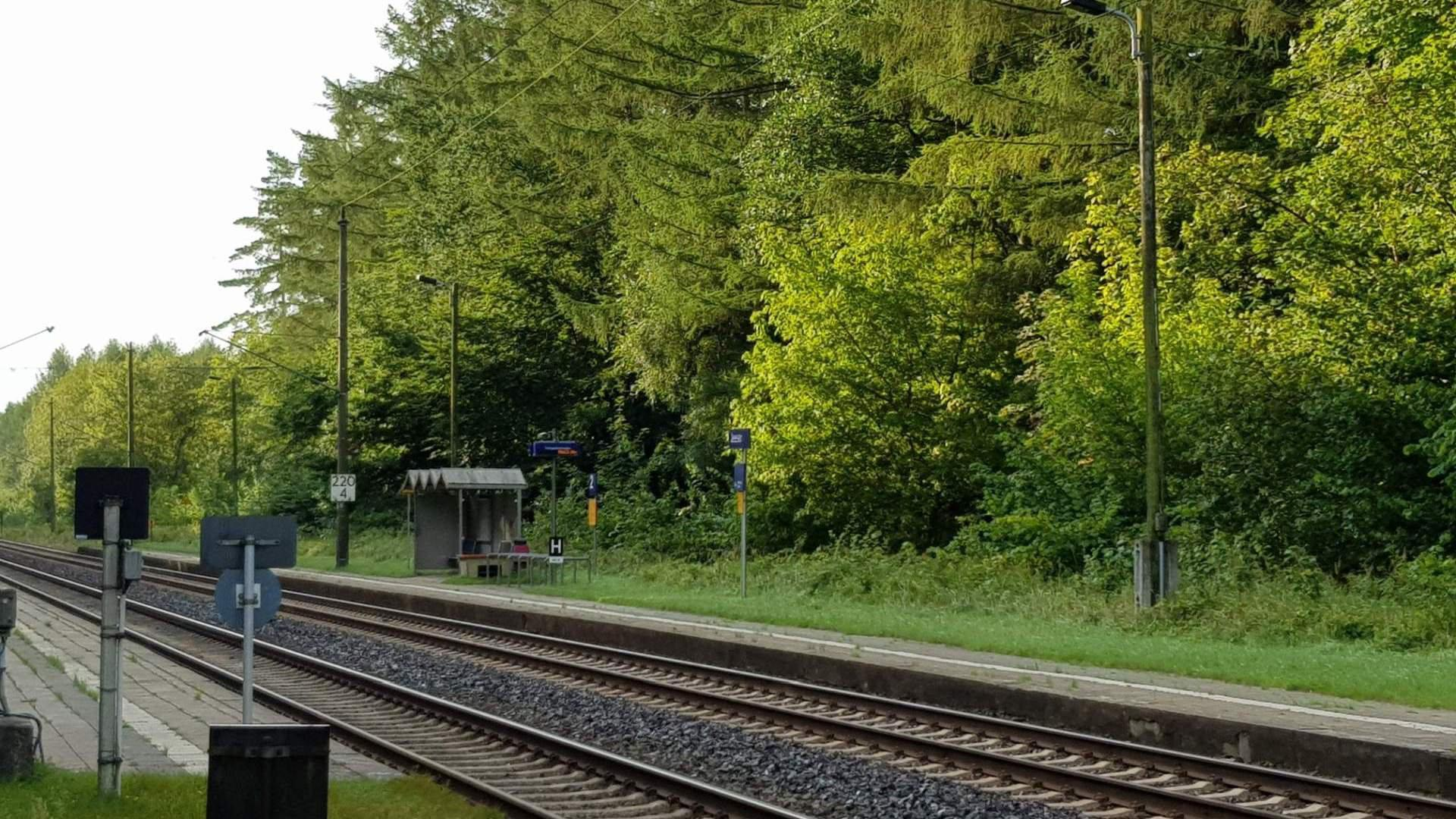
- Jeeser station

General information
- Location: Jeeser, MV, Germany
- Coordinates: 54°09′52″N 13°15′32″E
- Line: Angermünde-Stralsund railway
- Platforms: 2
- Tracks: 2

History
- Opened: 1880
- Electrified: 17 December 1988; 37 years ago

Services
Preceding station	Ostdeutsche Eisenbahn	Following station
Miltzow towards Rostock Hbf	RE 10	Greifswald towards Pasewalk
Location

Jeeser (German: Bahnhof Jeeser) is a railway station in the village of Jeeser, Mecklenburg-Vorpommern, Germany. The station lies on the Angermünde-Stralsund railway and the train services are operated by Ostdeutsche Eisenbahn.

== Train services ==
The station is served by the following service:

- Local services RE 10 (Rostock -) Stralsund - Greifswald - Züssow
