= Wüstenfelde station =

Railway station in Sundhagen, Germany

Wüstenfelde
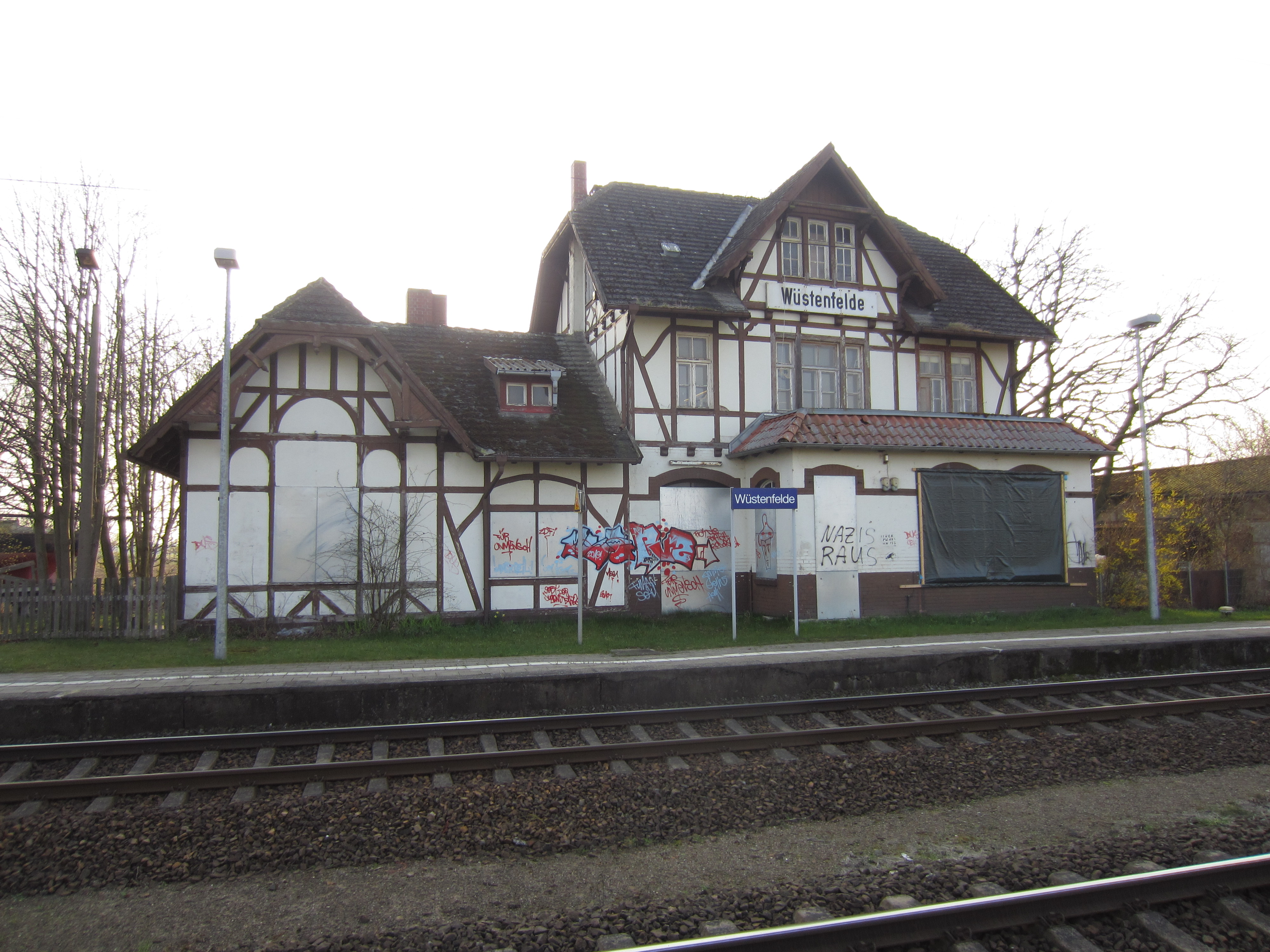
- Wüstenfelde railway station

General information
- Location: Wüstenfelde, MV, Germany
- Coordinates: 54°13′48″N 13°08′23″E
- Line: Angermünde-Stralsund railway
- Platforms: 2
- Tracks: 2

History
- Opened: 1881

Services
Preceding station	Ostdeutsche Eisenbahn	Following station
Stralsund Hbf towards Rostock Hbf	RE 10	Miltzow towards Pasewalk
Location

Wüstenfelde (German: Bahnhof Wüstenfelde) is a railway station in the village of Wüstenfelde, Mecklenburg-Vorpommern, Germany. The station lies on the Angermünde-Stralsund railway and the train services are operated by Ostdeutsche Eisenbahn (ODEG).

== Train services ==
The station is served by the following service:

- Local services RE 10 Stralsund - Greifswald - Züssow
