= Neustrelitz–Warnemünde railway =

Railway line in Germany

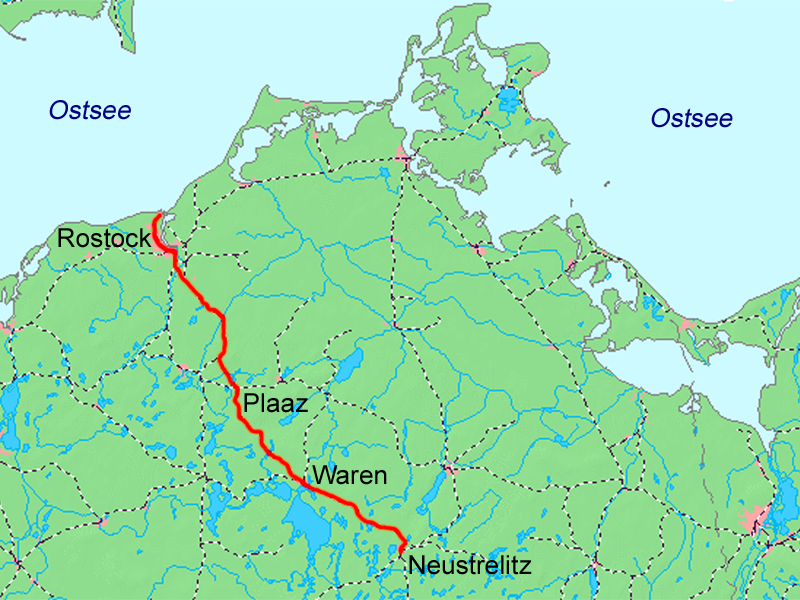

Overview
- Line number: 6325
- Locale: Mecklenburg-Vorpommern, Germany

Service
- Route number: 163 (Rostock–Plaaz); 181 (Rostock–Warnemünde); 205 (Rostock–Neustrelitz)

Technical
- Line length: 127.0 km (78.9 mi)
- Track gauge: 1,435 mm (4 ft 8 1/2 in) standard gauge
- Electrification: 15 kV/16.7 Hz AC overhead catenary
- Operating speed: 160 km/h (99 mph) (maximum) (Kavelstorf–Neustrelitz); 120 km/h (75 mph) (maximum) (Warnemünde–Kavelstorf)

The Neustrelitz–Warnemünde Railway (German: Neustrelitz-Warnemünder Eisenbahn) is a railway line in the North German state of Mecklenburg-Vorpommern. Most of the line is a double-tracked, electrified main line and runs for almost 130 kilometres from Neustrelitz to Warnemünde. It is also known in German as the Lloydbahn (Lloyd Railway), referring to the Deutsch-Nordischer Lloyd company, which built the line and operated it in its early years after its opening in 1886.

== Route ==
The Lloyd Railway begins in Neustrelitz Hauptbahnhof as a continuation of the Berlin Northern Railway. After the junction with the line to Stralsund, it turns to the northwest and passes through the Müritz National Park to Waren. The line has changed considerably with the upgrade of many sections of the line around 1960. The original line up to Kratzeburg ran significantly to the south of the current route. In Kargow there is the junction with the Waren (Müritz)–Neubrandenburg railway, which was dismantled after the Second World War for reparations. It was rebuilt to Möllenhagen and is still used for the transport of concrete. In Waren (Müritz) there are junctions with the branch to Malchin and the branch to Karow. East of Lalendorf, the line crosses the Neubrandenburg–Güstrow railway. A connecting curve runs to Lalendorf station. The Regional-Express trains turn off to Lalendorf, but the freight and some long-distance trains continue on the direct line via Laage. In Kavelstorf the line passes under the A19 and the A20 and the freight line to the Port of Rostock, which was built at the beginning in the 1960s, branches off. The Kavelstorf–Rostock section is the only single-track section of the line.

The line crosses the Warnow shortly before Rostock. A little later the line connects with the line from Güstrow. Traffic on the Rostock Hauptbahnhof–Warnemünde section is significant, especially for the Rostock S-Bahn.

== History ==
The first proposals for a branch line from the planned Prussian line from Berlin via Neubrandenburg to Stralsund (the Berlin Northern Railway) via Neustrelitz to Rostock emerged in 1873. However, the financing of the project was difficult, so it took about ten years for it to be built and for operations to begin.

=== Lloyd Railway ===
On 10 June 1883, the Belgian company Société Belge de chemins de fer ("Belgian company for railways") founded a subsidiary called the Eisenbahn- und Dampfschiffs-Actien-Gesellschaft Deutsch-Nordischer Lloyd ("German-Nordic Lloyd Railway and Steamship Company") and based in Rostock. Its concessions were granted in Mecklenburg-Schwerin on 23 June 1883 and in Mecklenburg-Strelitz on 2 August 1883. Its goal was to a build railway on the shortest route from Berlin to Copenhagen from Neustrelitz, the location of the court of the Grand Duchy of Mecklenburg-Strelitz, via Rostock to the harbour of Warnemünde. The company would there develop the port and establish a regular boat service to a Scandinavian port. The two Mecklenburg grand duchies supported the project financially. The construction costs were estimated at 15 million marks.

After two years of construction, the 113 km long section from Neustrelitz via Waren and Plaaz to Rostock was opened for freight on 1 June 1886. Passenger services commenced on 10 June. The Lloyd-Bahnhof (Lloyd station) in Rostock was built in 1896, after traffic on the entire Rostock railway had gradually built up, as the main station (originally called the Central-Bahnhof, “central station”) of the city.

The remaining section of the line to Warnemünde, which was 13 kilometres long, was opened on 1 July 1886. On the same day the steamship line from Warnemünde to Gjedser (now Gedser) on the Danish island of Falster was put into operation. The Nykøbing–Gedser railway was also opened. Thus, the travel time between Berlin and Copenhagen was shortened from about 17 to 12 hours. In 1889, the Lloyd Railway opened a port railway from the Lloyd station in Rostock to the port of Rostock.

The operation turned out to be very profitable from the start. Thus, in 1887 around 54% of revenue covered operating expenses. As part of its general railway nationalisation policy, the Mecklenburg Government negotiated with the Lloyd Railway in 1894. Due to its high profitability, the negotiations were difficult. The whole railway was acquired by the Grand Duchy of Mecklenburg-Schwerin and it was incorporated in the Grand Duchy of Mecklenburg Friedrich-Franz Railway (Großherzoglich Mecklenburgische Friedrich-Franz-Eisenbahn or MFFE) on 1 April 1894. Its 15 locomotives were also acquired.

=== State Railway ===
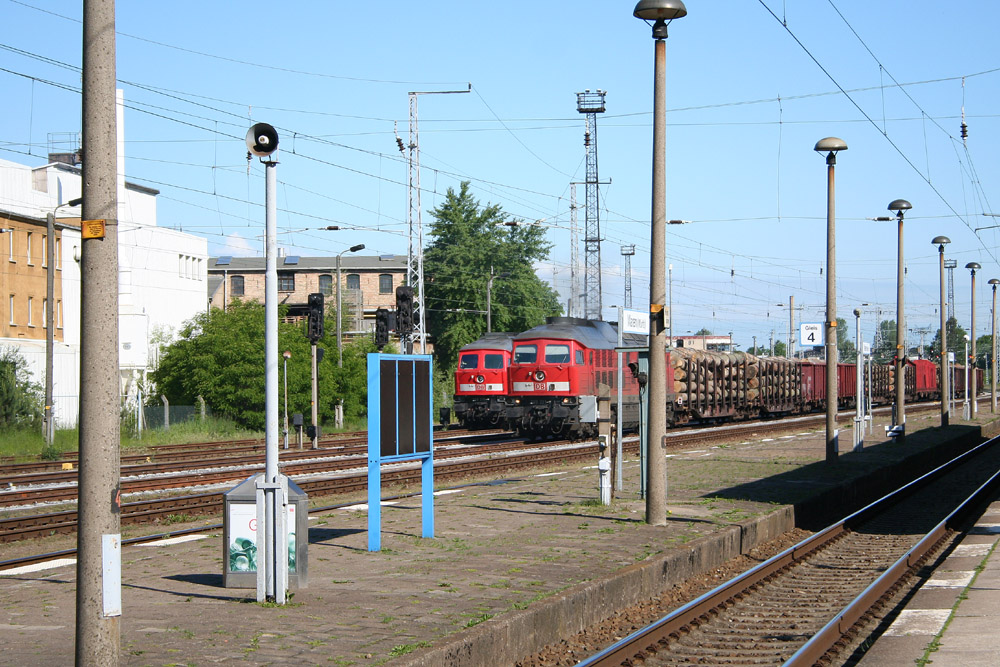
Waren (Müritz) station

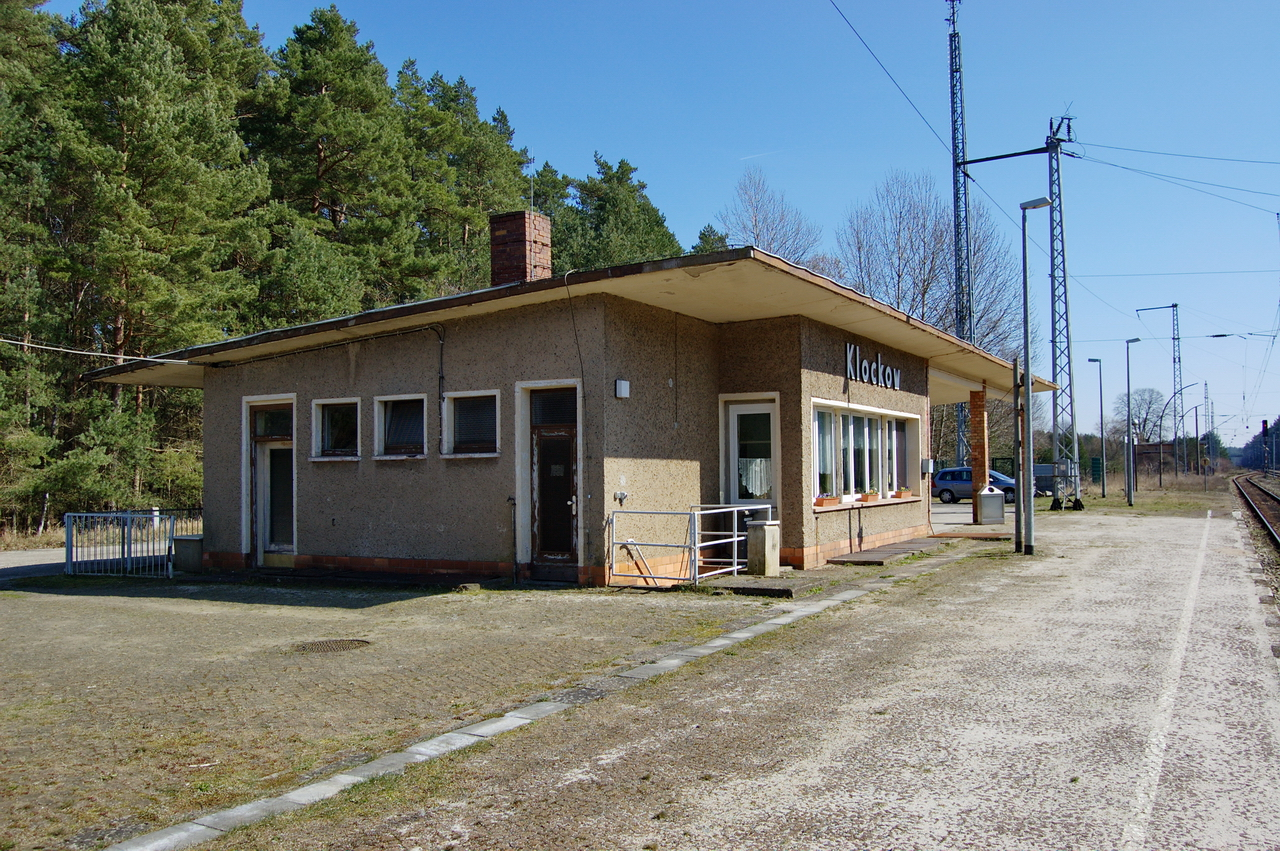
The now demolished station building in Klockow. Many buildings on the Lloyd Railway were built in this type

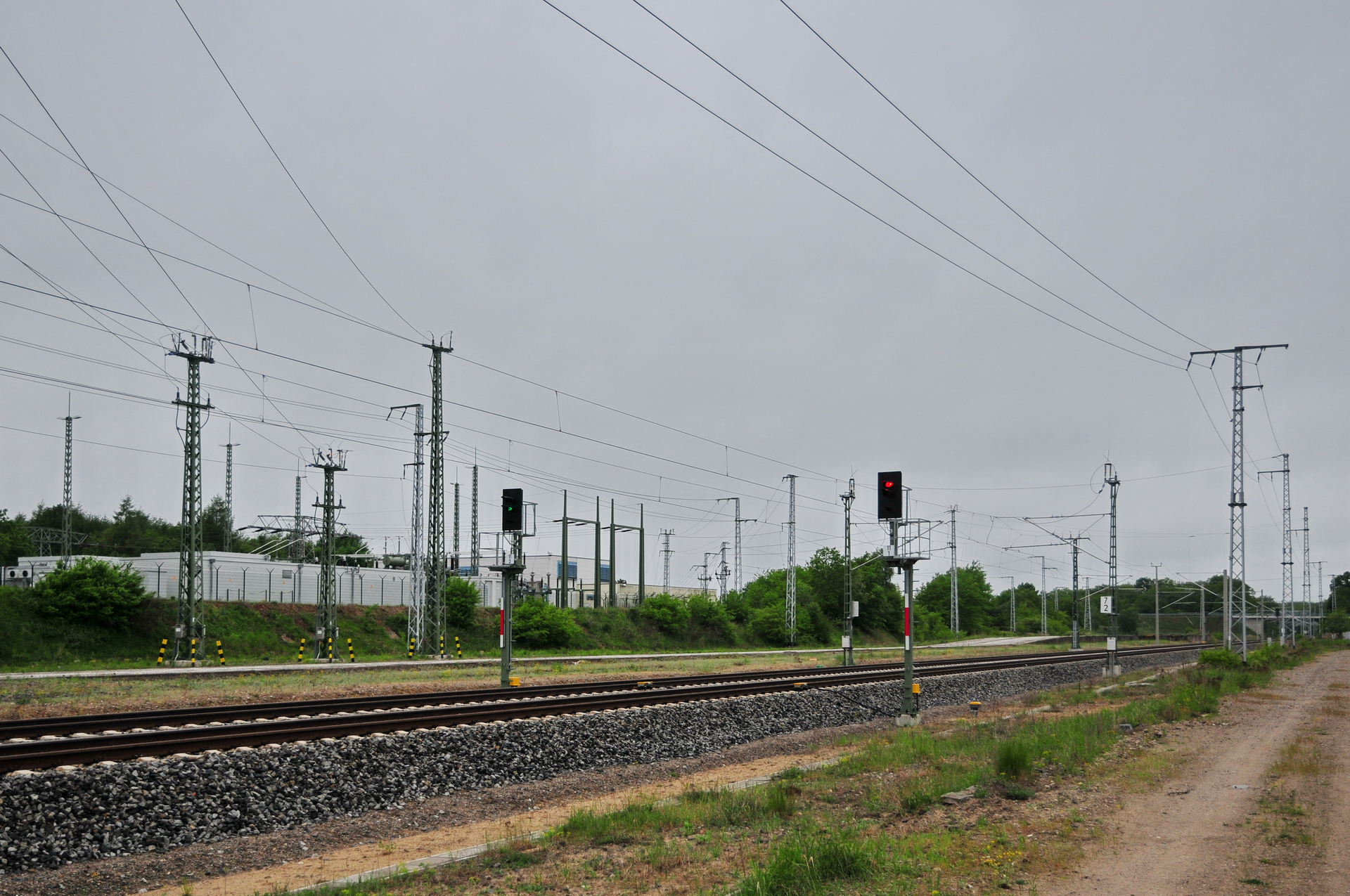
Substation for rail power supply in Adamsdorf

The importance of the railway rose sharply on 1 October 1903 with the opening of the train ferry to Gedser. From then on there were international express trains from Berlin to Copenhagen, which made the railway the most important link between the capital and Scandinavia. At this time, the MFFE opened a 1.2-kilometre route from the former Warnemünde station, which subsequently became a goods station, to the new Warnemünde station, directly next to the ferry wharf.

On 29 December 1941, Wehrmacht train W 96 031 ran into two locomotives at the station Langhagen due to incorrectly set points. 27 people were killed and 33 more were injured.

The line suffered the biggest set back in its history after the Second World War with the dismantling of the section from Neustrelitz via Waren and Lalendorf to Plaaz. Trains had to detour via Neubrandenburg, Malchin and Teterow. It proved necessary to reconstruct the line, partly because of the considerable freight traffic to the newly constructed port of Rostock. The symbolic groundbreaking ceremony for the reconstruction of the line took place in Kratzeburg on 27 November 1959, but reconstruction had already begun between Langhagen and Lalendorf on 15 March. Eleven days later, the first gravel train ran from Langhagen to Rostock.

The line between Neustrelitz and Lalendorf was reopened in 1961. Many sections of the line were realigned, resulting in significant relocations of the line, especially between Neustrelitz and Kratzeburg. In 1964, this was followed by new alignments between Lalendorf Ost and Plaaz (on a new route bypassing Lalendorf station) and between Kavelstorf and the port of Rostock. Architectural evidence of the reconstruction are the characteristic single-storey station building in Scharstorf, Subzin-Liessow, Langhagen, Grabowhöfe, Klockow, Kratzeburg and Adamsdorf.

Another major railway accident occurred in Langhagen station on 1 November 1964. 44 people were killed and 70 more were injured, some seriously, when an express train from Berlin, which was traveling towards Rostock, ran into a derailed freight train.

The line was relocated between Evershagen and Warnemünde Werft in 1974. First, in 1970, a branch line was opened on 12 July 1970 from Bramow to the temporary station of Lütten Klein Süd, which used the route of the line's former second track to Evershagen station. In preparation for the establishment of the Rostock S-Bahn, the line was double-tracked and extended to Warnemünde Werft in 1974. The old route through Schmarl was abandoned. Also in the mid-1970s, the line was moved in the town of Waren and a section of the old town was demolished. In the 1970s, the line was duplicated, with the exception of the section between Rostock and Kavelstorf.

The line was electrified in 1984/1985 in several sections starting from Neustrelitz. Electric services started on 19 May 1985, running initially via Güstrow and, from 15 December 1985, over the actual Lloyd Railway via Laage.

The Warnemünde–Gedser train ferry was closed on 23 September 1995. Since then, no trains have run on this line to Copenhagen. The inter-regional trains between Rostock and Berlin were replaced by Regional-Express trains in 2001. As a result, there were long-distance services until 2002, when the private InterConnex (Warnemünde–Rostock–Berlin–Leipzig) service was introduced. It was also served by an overnight train from Binz to Cologne and Munich from 2003 to October 2007.

The Regionalbahn service between Güstrow and Waren was abandoned in 1999 and since then the stations in Langhagen, Vollrathsruhe and Grabowhöfe have not been served by passenger services. On 19 September 2011, the stations in Kargow and Klockow were closed, so that between Waren and Neustrelitz only Kratzeburg station is still served; this station also serves the Müritz National Park. A bus service was established by Personenverkehr GmbH Müritz (PVM) from Waren via Kargow to Klockow.

== Current situation ==
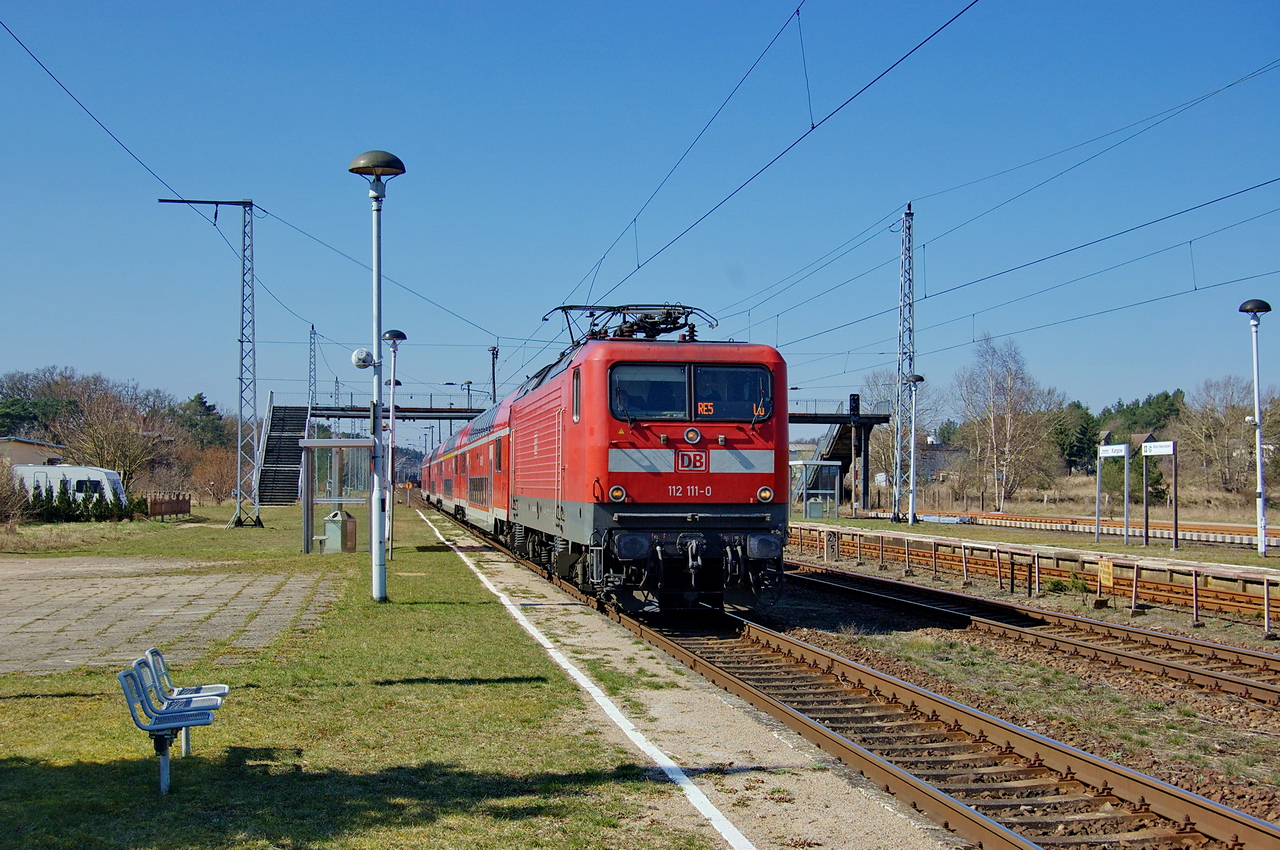
Train on line RE 5 from Rostock to Lutherstadt Wittenberg in Kargow station

Regional-Express service (RE 5) runs every two hours on the Rostock–Güstrow–Waren–Neustrelitz–Berlin–Lutherstadt Wittenberg route. Since the completion of the reconstruction between Rostock and Lalendorf in June 2007, an Intercity-Express service has operated six times a week from Warnemunde to Berlin and Munich. Since December 2007, the InterConnex services has run via Gustrow, using one of the time slots of the RE 5, which runs on the direct route via Plaaz. In addition, the ICE service and a Berlin–Warnemünde excursion train run on this section on weekends.

Additional local services operate on the Rostock–Plaaz (–Güstrow) sections (hourly on weekdays, every two hours on the weekend, as part of the Rostock S-Bahn) and (Ludwiglust–) Waren–Neustrelitz (operated by Ostdeutsche Eisenbahn). Apart from the Rostock S-Bahn, several services run between Rostock and Warnemünde: the ICE service to Munich, the Interconnex service, an Intercity service on the Warnemünde–Magdeburg–Leipzig–Dresden route (on weekends from March to October and daily from June to August) and the weekend excursion train to/from Berlin.

== Upgrading of the line ==
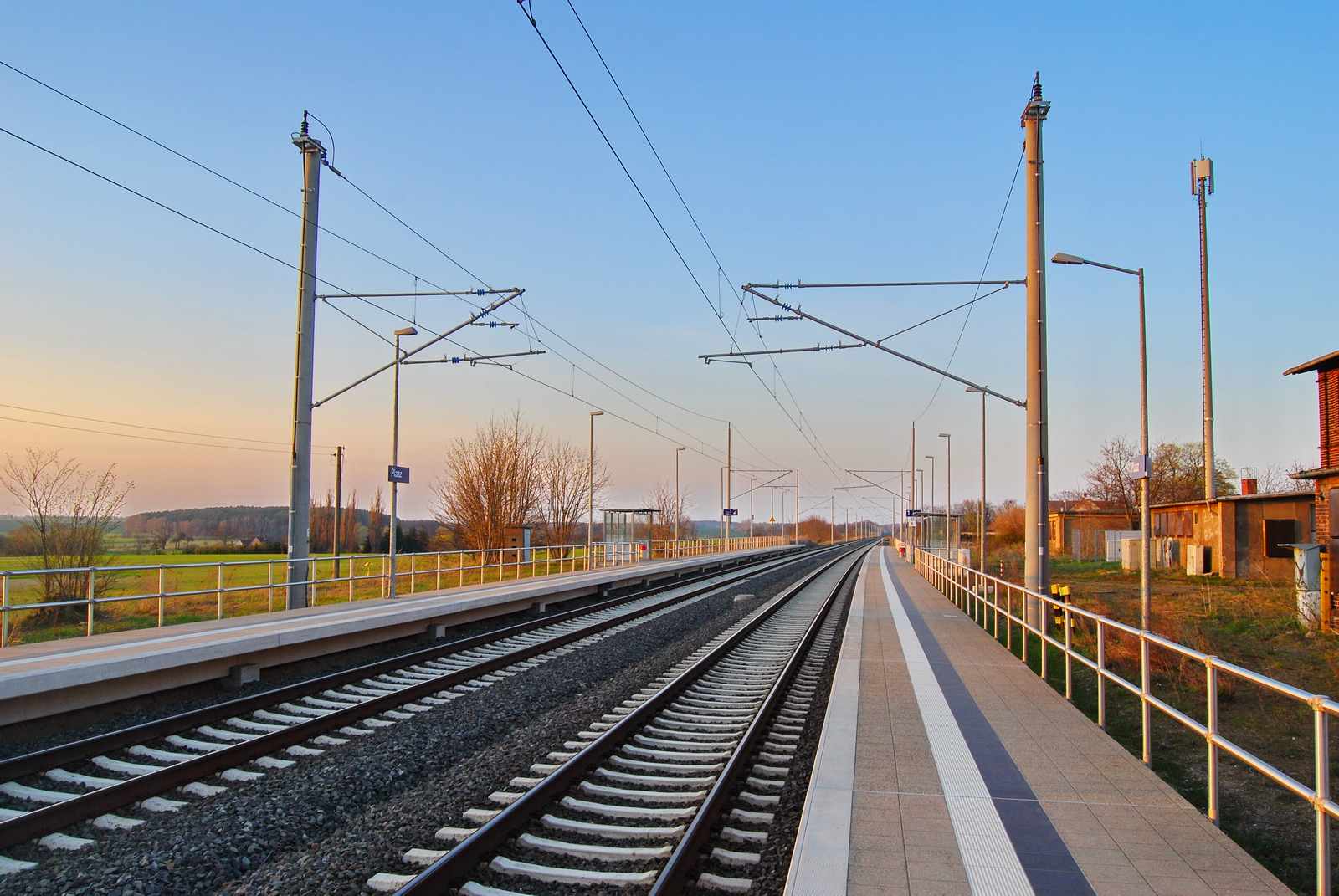
Already upgraded Plaaz station looking towards Rostock.

The Berlin–Rostock is being upgraded as part of an investment program on the existing network for speeds of generally 160 km/h and higher axle loads of up to 25 tonnes. It is being equipped with the European Train Control System with a total of 13 electronic interlockings. The work has been carried out in sections since 2005 and is expected to be completed in 2033. A financing agreement for the upgrade was settled with DB Netz in December 2002. While the work was estimated to cost a total of €685 million in 2006, the estimated cost in 2013 had risen to about €850 million. Of this, the federal government is funding €577 million, the European Regional Development Fund is funding €167 million and the rest is being funded by Deutsche Bahn from its own resources.

In June 2007, the first upgraded section between Rostock and Lalendorf Ost was reopened after a year of complete renovation. From June 2010 to April 2012, the Neustrelitz–Kratzeburg section was upgraded with train operations running on a single track. The section between Kratzeburg and Waren will follow. Upgrading on the line between Waren and Lalendorf has been underway since September 2012 and the train service on this section was closed from 10 September 2012 to 26 April 2013 for this work.

As part of the upgrade, the platform in Kratzeburg station is being extended and in future it will be served by the Rostock–Berlin Regional-Express services. Langhagen station is being reactivated for passenger services. The traveling time of Regional-Express services between Neustrelitz and Rostock has not been reduced compared to the situation before the start of the work.

Waren (Müritz) station was rehabilitated between April 2018 and October 2019. The construction includes:

- Reconstruction and new construction of ramps and stairway facilities
- Renewal of the track superstructure and the overhead contact line system
- Construction of a new central island platform
- Construction of a new electronic interlocking system (ESTW)
