= Mecklenburg Southern Railway =

Railway line in Germany

Parchim–Neubrandenburg
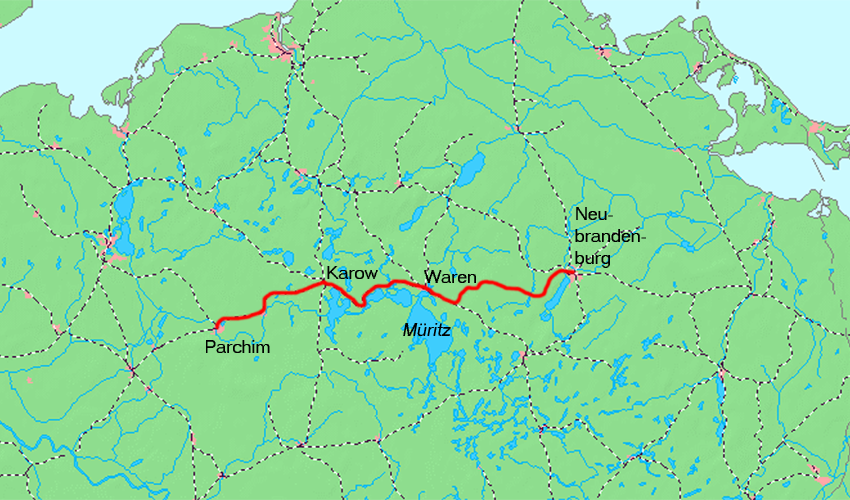

Overview
- Line number: 6935 (Parchim–Waren); 6767 (Kargow–Neubrandenburg)

Service
- Route number: 172

Technical
- Line length: 117.1 km (72.8 mi)
- Track gauge: 1,435 mm (4 ft 8 1/2 in)

The Mecklenburg Southern Railway (German: Mecklenburgische Südbahn) or Parchim–Neubrandenburg railway is a railway line in the south of Mecklenburg-Vorpommern in North Germany. It was operated by the Mecklenburg Southern Railway Company which transferred in 1885 into the Friedrich Franz Railway Company. Today the section from Möllenhagen to Neubrandenburg is closed, whilst the remaining section is owned by the DB Netz. The section from Karow (Meckl) to Waren (Müritz) was leased by the DB to the Prignitzer Eisenbahn on 1 March 2008. Passenger services on the (Ludwigslust–)Parchim–Waren(–Neustrelitz) stretch are provided by the Ostdeutsche Eisenbahn (ODEG) and goods services on the sections from Waren to Malchow (Meck.) and Möllenhagen are delivered mainly by DB Schenker Rail Deutschland.
