= Bad Kleinen–Rostock railway =

Railway line in Germany

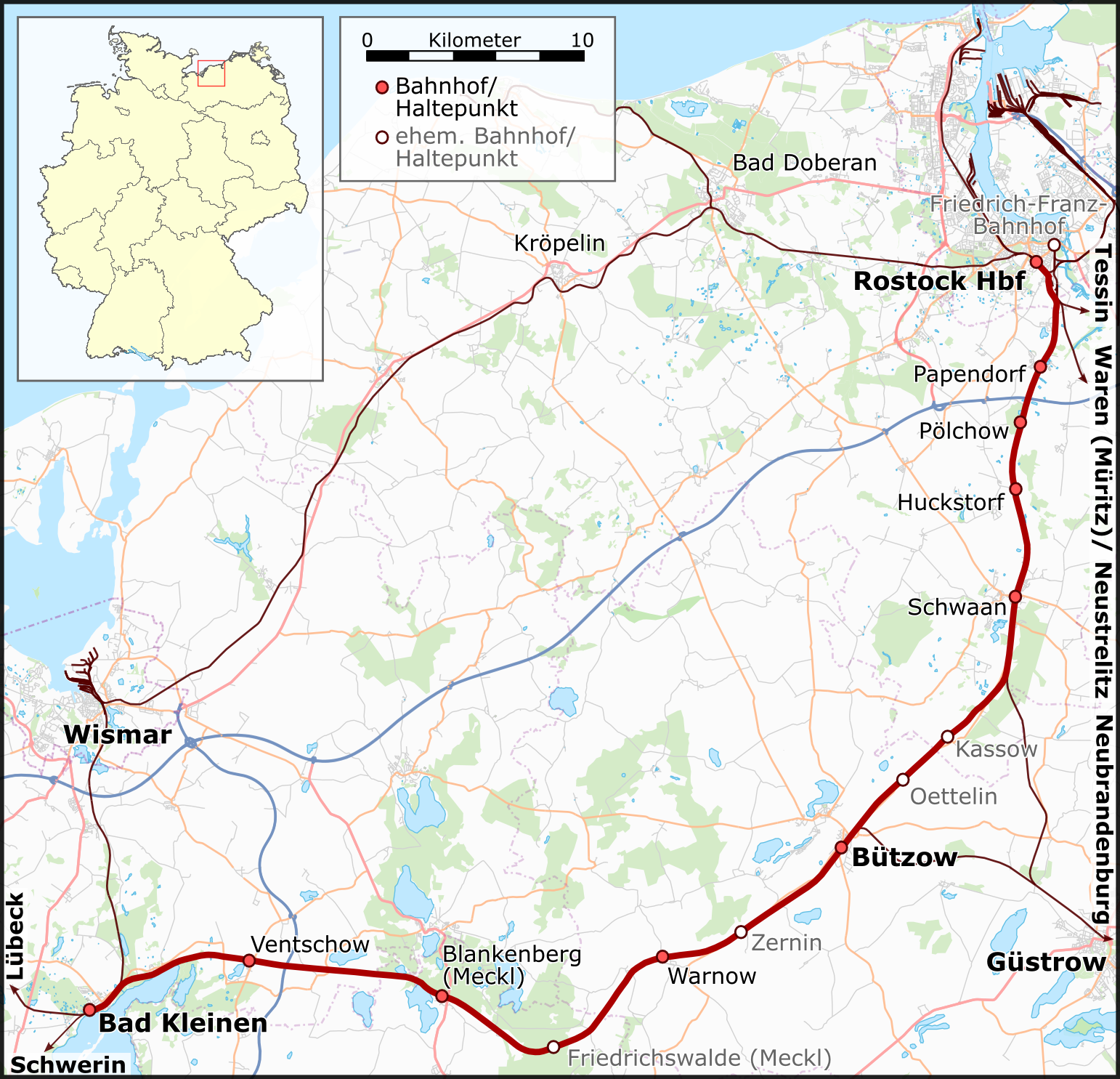
- Route of the Bad Kleinen–Rostock line

Overview
- Line number: Bad Kleinen–Bützow: 1122; Bützow–Rostock: 6446
- Locale: Mecklenburg-Vorpommern, Germany

Service
- Route number: 100

Technical
- Line length: 71 km (44 mi)
- Track gauge: 1,435 mm (4 ft 8 1/2 in) standard gauge
- Electrification: 15 kV/16.7 Hz AC overhead
- Operating speed: Ventschow–Schwaan: 160 km/h (99 mph) (max); rest of the line: 120 km/h (75 mph) (max)

The Bad Kleinen–Rostock railway is a double track electrified railway in the German state of Mecklenburg-Vorpommern. The Ludwigslust–Bad Kleinen section of the line is double track. The line was opened in 1850 by the Mecklenburg Railway Company (German: Mecklenburgische Eisenbahngesellschaft) and is one of the oldest railways in Germany and is part of the Leipzig–Magdeburg–Schwerin–Rostock main line.

== Route ==
From Bad Kleinen station the line runs to the east, initially along the north bank of the Schweriner See (lake) through a forested area with many lakes. Near Blankenberg station the line crosses the Wismar–Karow line, which closed in 1998. The Wismar–Karow line station is located south of the main line. The line reaches the valley of Warnow river near Warnow station (which is closed for passenger services). The route then turns to the northeast. On the northern outskirts of Bützow the line to Güstrow branches off. Another line runs to Güstrow from south of Schwaan station. Beyond Schwaan the line crosses the Warnow again. Before Rostock the line branches off the old line to Friedrich-Franz station. The curve to Rostock Hauptbahnhof is the only single-track section of the line and runs parallel with the line from Neustrelitz and Tessin.

== History ==
=== Planning and Construction ===
The Berlin–Hamburg line, opened in 1846, was the first railway passing through the Grand Duchy of Mecklenburg-Schwerin. Immediately afterwards Mecklenburg-Schwerin began work on a link from Hagenow to Schwerin, which was opened on 1 May 1847. On 12 July 1848, the line was extended to Wismar. It was decided that the route to Rostock and Güstrow would run via Kleinen (now Bad Kleinen). This involved a deviation from a straight line, but avoided the cost of an expensive embankment over Lake Schwerin (Schweriner See). The state granted 700,000 thalers to finance the railway.

On 13 May 1850, a branch line was opened from Bützow to Güstrow. The station was built in the southeast of Rostock near the old Steintor gate and the Warnow river. The city decided to name it Friedrich Franz station after the ruling Grand Duke Friedrich Franz II. The station building was opened in 1853.

Initially, two pairs of trains a day ran between Rostock and Hagenow, stopping in Schwaan, Bützow, Blankenberg, Kleinen and Schwerin. Three pairs of trains ran between Wismar and Kleinen and between Bützow and Güstrow as feeder services.

=== Development of the line up to 1945 ===
In the following years the network was further expanded. Between 1863 and 1867 the line to Güstrow was extended to Neubrandenburg and Stettin (now Szczecin). The construction of the Lübeck–Bad Kleinen line in 1870 established an east–west line from Hamburg to Stettin; it ran along the Bad Kleinen–Rostock line between Bad Kleinen and Bützow. In 1905 five pairs of passenger trains and one pair express trains (with an additional train in the summer months) ran on the line, mainly on the Hamburg to Stettin route. Through coaches were detached from these trains to run to Rostock and Warnemünde.

In Rostock, the situation changed with the construction of the Lloyd Railway between Neustrelitz and Warnemünde in 1886, which had its own railway station in Rostock. As having two different stations in the city was undesirable, it was decided that all passenger trains should use the Lloyd station, which was later called Rostock Hauptbahnhof. From 1896, the trains from Bützow ran to this station. After a connection was opened from the Stralsund line to the Hauptbahnhof in 1905, the old Friedrich Franz station became a freight yard only. Also significant for the line was the reconstruction of the Warnemünde station in 1903 and the establishment of a direct train ferry service to Gedser, Denmark. From then on direct Hamburg–Rostock–Copenhagen trains operated, with sections continuing to Stockholm and Oslo.

In 1934 services consisted of two pairs of high-quality express trains (D-Zug)—with an additional service in the summer—between Hamburg and Scandinavia, a semi-fast train between Rostock and Uelzen, an express train between Rostock and Lübeck and, in summer, an express train between Rostock and Leipzig. Between Bad Kleinen and Bützow there was one D-Zug and one ordinary express train (with through coaches to Rostock) on the Hamburg–Stettin route.

=== 1945 to 1990 ===
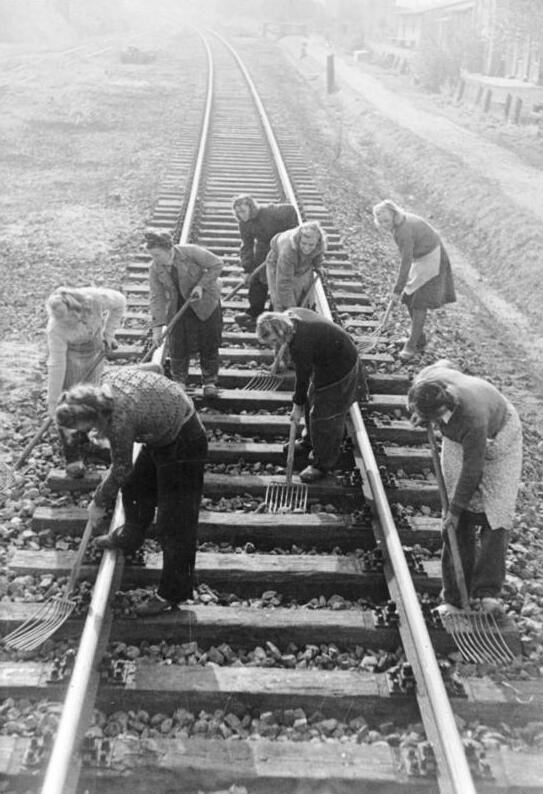
Reconstruction of the Rostock– Schwaan section in 1948

After 1945, the changed border significantly affected traffic flows on the line. East–west traffic on the link became negligible. The link between Rostock and the south was more important. The Rostock–Bützow section was dismantled for reparations in 1945, but it was quickly rebuilt. The reconstruction of the Rostock–Schwaan section was rebuilt in 1948 as one of the first youth projects (Jugendobjekt) of the Free German Youth and used for propaganda. The line became ever more important in the following decades, both for passenger and freight transport (especially to the port of Rostock). Between 1973 and 1975, the line was duplicated again. Summer services in the 1980s consisted of up to ten pairs of express trains between Rostock and Magdeburg and usually continuing to Leipzig or Erfurt. Added to this was an Interzonal train via Lubeck to Hamburg, a Rostock–Schwerin express train and some local passenger trains.

As a result of the oil crisis in the 1970s, East German Railways electrified several lines in the early 1980s. Electrification of the Schwaan–Rostock section was extended to Güstrow in May 1985 and the rest of the line was electrified in 1986 and 1987.

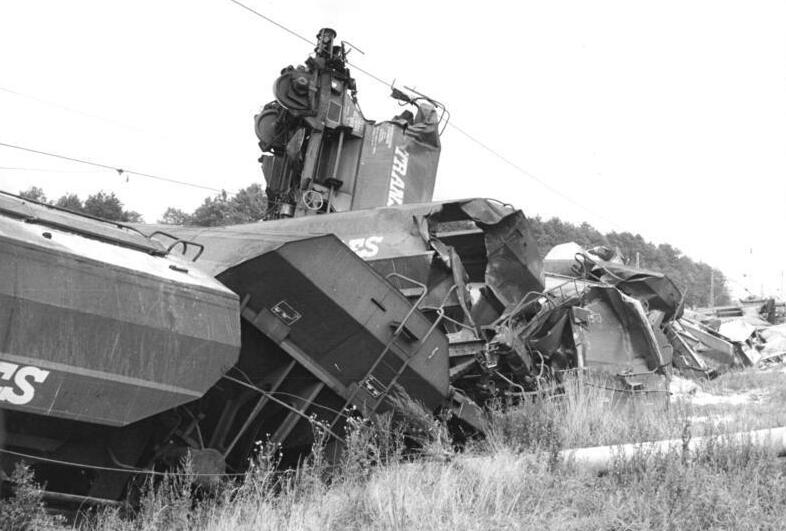
Train crash between Bützow and Schwaan in 1987

=== Since 1990 ===
After German reunification a number of additional trains were introduced to Hamburg. In the first half of the 1990s InterRegio services operated on the Stralsund–Rostock–Hamburg and Rostock–Leipzig routes every two hours. The connection to Leipzig was replaced in the mid-1990s by a connection in Bad Kleinen, except for a seasonal Intercity service.

The line was modernised for maximum speeds of up to 160 km/h as part of German Unity Transport Project No. 1 and was originally planned to be completed by 2002. This upgrade, however, has not yet been completed. The Ventschow–Blankenberg and Warnow–Schwaan (to the station's southern exit) sections were first upgraded to 160 km/h. At the end of 2008 this was followed by the section between Blankenberg and Warnow (together with the bridge in Warnow). Now nearly 45 km of the 71 km line can be operated at 160 km/h.

== Current operations ==
The whole line is operated by Regional-Express trains on the Rostock–Hamburg route (Hanseexpress) every two hours. On the Bad Kleinen–Schwerin–Holthusen section, it is also served every the two hours by Intercity (IC) trains on the (Binz–) Stralsund–Rostock–Schwerin–Hamburg route and continuing to western or south western Germany. Almost all IC trains on the line stop in Rostock and Bützow, while Regional-Express trains also stop in Schwaan, Blankenberg, Ventschow and Bad Kleinen. Between Bützow and Bad Kleinen Regional-Express services also operate, every two hours, on the Szczecin–Lubeck route, stopping in Blankenberg and Ventschow. The Rostock–Schwaan section is also used by Rostock S-Bahn trains (stopping at all stations) and Rostock–Berlin trains (not stopping at the minor stations on this line). With the timetable change in December 2008, the Bad Kleinen station was largely abandoned as an IC stop. Only one early morning IC train to Hamburg as well as an IC between Leipzig and Warnemünde still stop there.
