= Bützow–Szczecin railway =

Railway line in Germany and Poland

Bützow–Pasewalk–Szczecin
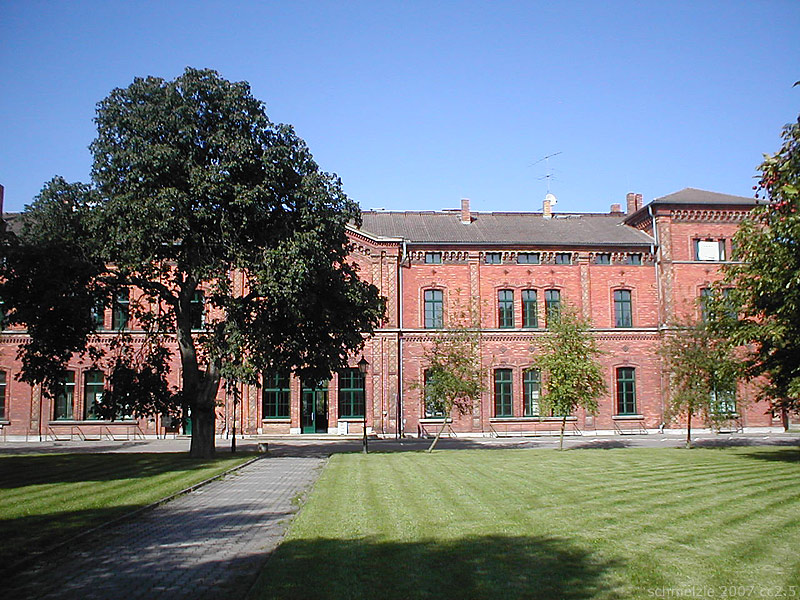
- Exterior of Malchin station

Overview
- Line number: 1122 Bützow–Strasburg; 6327 Strasburg–Grambow; 408 Stobno–Szczecin Główny
- Locale: Mecklenburg-Vorpommern and Brandenburg, Germany and Poland

Service
- Route number: 175

Technical
- Line length: 195.6 km (121.5 mi)
- Track gauge: 1,435 mm (4 ft 8 1/2 in) standard gauge
- Electrification: Szczecin Gumieńce–Szczecin: 3 kV DC overhead catenary; Bützow–Lalendorf: 15 kV/16.7 Hz AC overhead catenary
- Operating speed: 120 km/h (74.6 mph) (maximum)

The Bützow–Szczecin railway is a nearly 200 km-long, mostly non-electrified, single-track main line railway running mostly in the German state of Mecklenburg-Vorpommern. The first section of the line between Bützow and Güstrow was opened in 1850 by the Mecklenburg Railway Company (German: Mecklenburgische Eisenbahngesellschaft) and is one of the oldest railways in Germany and is part of the Leipzig–Magdeburg–Schwerin–Rostock main line.

== History ==
=== Route and construction ===
In 1850, the Mecklenburg Railway Company, opened the line between Bützow and Güstrow, as a branch line of the Bad Kleinen–Rostock line built by the same company.

An extension to the east was proposed to connect to the Grand Duchy of Mecklenburg-Strelitz. As there were few wealthy investors, the Güstrow–Neubrandenburg line was built by the government of Mecklenburg-Schwerin at the initiative of Grand Duke Frederick Francis (Friedrich-Franz) II. The line was formally opened on 11 November 1864 at Teterow station in the presence of the two grand dukes, Frederick Francis and Frederick William of Mecklenburg. The Grand Duchy of Mecklenburg Friedrich-Franz Railway (Großherzoglich Mecklenburgische Friedrich-Franz-Eisenbahn) was founded to operate the line, which later took over other lines in the country as well. The original headquarters of the company was in Malchin.

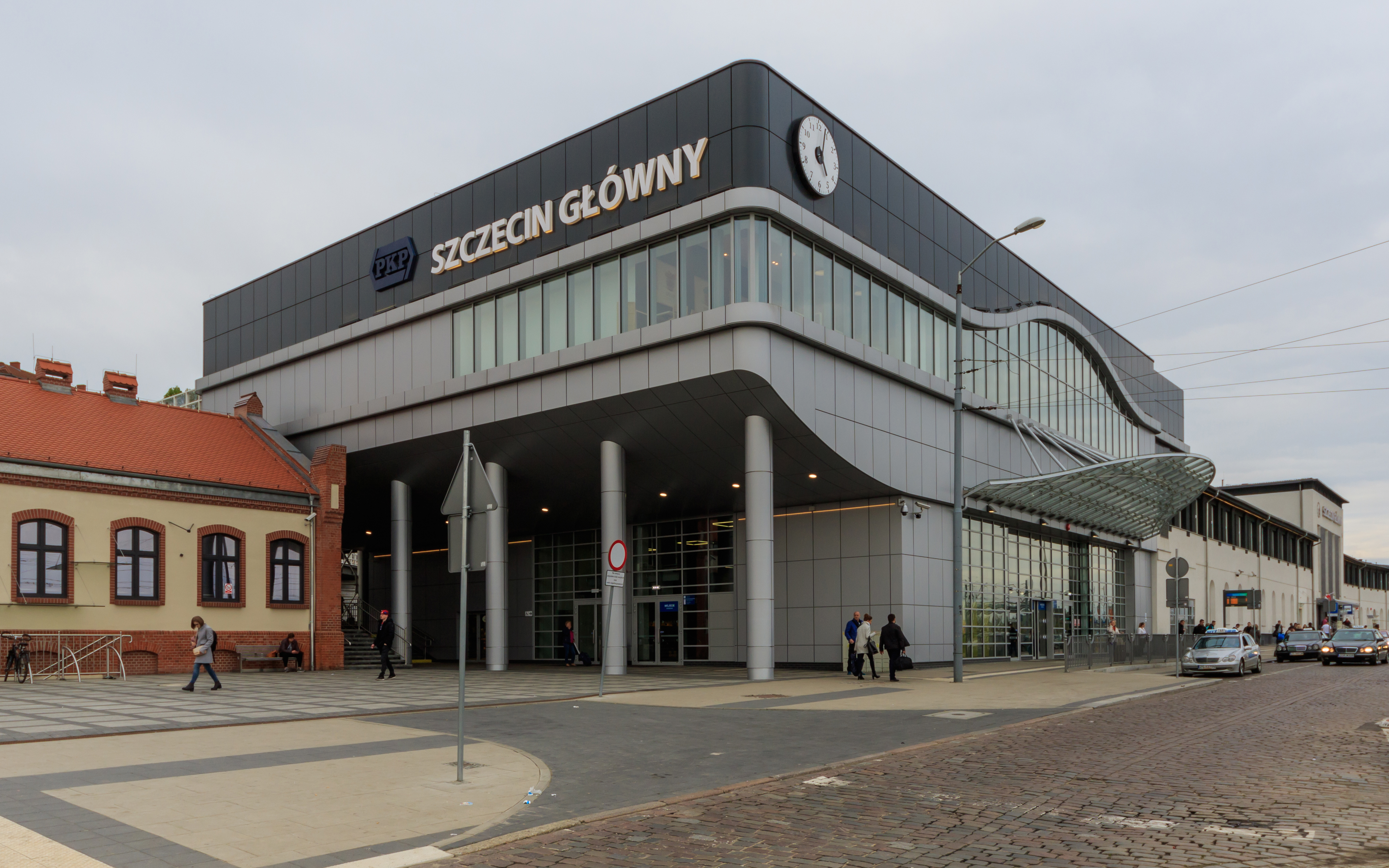
Facade of Szczecin Główny station

In 1866/67, the line was extended from Neubrandenburg to Strasburg (Uckermark) on the Prussian border. At the same time the line was extended on the Prussian side from Pasewalk. There, the line connected with the Angermünde–Anklam line and the line between Szczecin (then Stettin) and Pasewalk that had already been opened on 16 March 1863 by the Berlin-Stettin Railway Company (Berlin-Stettiner Eisenbahn-Gesellschaft).

=== 1875–1945 ===
The Friedrich-Franz Railway was privatised in 1875 and re-nationalised in 1890, until finally after the First World War it was integrated into the German State Railways. The section from the border at Strasburg to Stettin was absorbed by the Prussian State Railways as part of the nationalisation of the Berlin-Stettin Railway Company in 1880.

In 1890 the construction of the Bützow–Güstrow Canal required the line to be moved to the north in Bützow. At the same time the route of the line to Bützow station was changed with the connection to the Rostock–Bad Kleinen line being moved to face to the south rather than the north. This allowed trains to run directly from Bad Kleinen without changing direction. The bridge over the Nebel river on the old route is preserved in Bützow.

In 1905, about five to seven pairs of trains ran on the line each day, including a fast passenger trains and a stopping train between Hamburg and Stettin, and a train ran between Hamburg and Neubrandenburg. At the boundary in Strasburg, trains continued after a brief stop.

After World War I, the Friedrich-Franz Railway and the Prussian State Railways were taken over by the German State Railways. Strasburg was on the border of lines controlled by railway divisions in Schwerin and Stettin. Services changed little following nationalisation. A continuous D-express and an ordinary express ran to Hamburg, and four pairs of ordinary trains ran to Stettin (and five between Bützow and Güstrow), with one of them also running all the way from Hamburg to Stettin. There were additional trains on parts of the route. Between Pasewalk and Szczecin service levels were much denser.

Briefly trains stopped in Remplin (only for two excursion trains on Sundays) and Nienhagen (introduced in early 1940s). After the Second World War both stations disappeared from the train schedules.

=== 1945–1990 ===
After the Second World War most of the route was in East Germany and became part of the East German railways. The section from the border at Grambow to Szczecin became part of Polish State Railways (PKP). The former continuous line between Hamburg and Szczecin was disrupted by the border with Poland and the Inner German border. The second track, which existed west of Teterow, was dismantled after the war, making it a single-track line, as it still is.

Because of the dismantling of the Lloyd Railway between Neustrelitz and Plaaz for reparations to the Soviet Union trains between Berlin and Rostock ran from 1945 to 1961 via Güstrow and Neubrandenburg.

In the first years after the war, there was little travel to Poland. Between 1950 and 1952 there was a continuous through coach connection between Berlin and Szczecin via Pasewalk. After that the route across the border was for a long time only used for freight. Passenger services were only resumed in May 1972, following the introduction of visa-free travel between East Germany and Poland.

=== Since 1990 ===
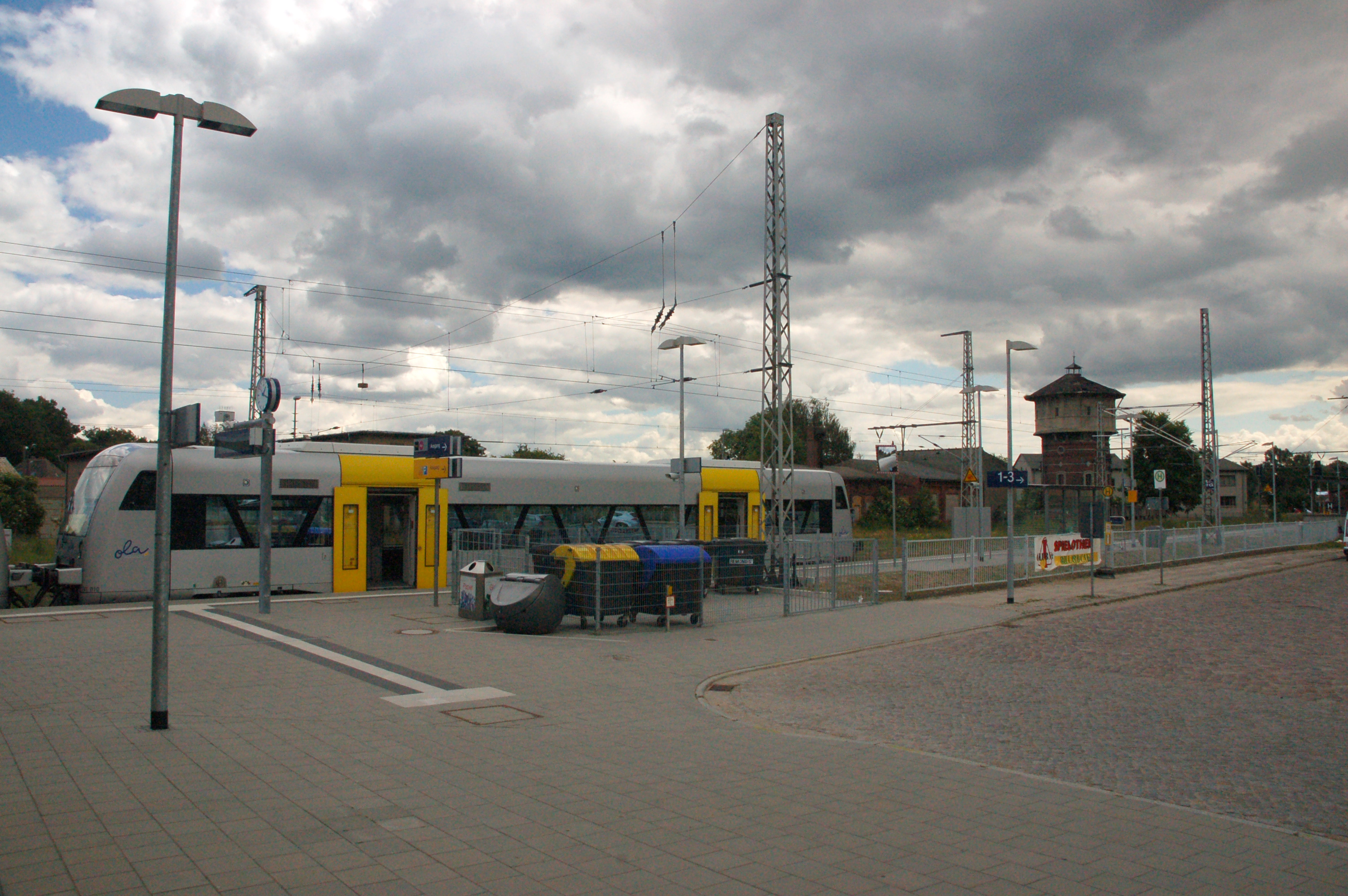
Pasewalk station

In 1991, passenger services to Poland were resumed. As a result, three to four pairs of trains ran to Szczecin, the rest ended in Grambow. In 2001 services to Szczecin were increased to a frequency of every two hours.

Services have gradually increased on the Bützow–Pasewalk section. In 1995 Regional-Express trains (stopping in Güstrow, Teterow, Malchin, Stavenhagen, Neubrandenburg and Strasburg) ran approximately every two-hour and took about 130 minutes to run and were followed by Regionalbahn trains, stopping at all stations. In 1996 the timetable was changed. Some minor stations were closed. Since then, Regional-Express trains have run every hour, stopping at almost all the remaining stations. Since 1998, trains of DB Regio and a private operator, Ostmecklenburgische Eisenbahn (now Ostseeland-Verkehr) run alternately every two hours, so that overall there is an approximate hourly service between Bützow and Pasewalk.

Since 2002, trains from Szczecin again run on the whole route to Bützow. They originally ran to Hagenow, but since 2006 to Lübeck. This is the first time since the war again that through trains have run between Lübeck to Szczecin. The cruising speed is poor, however, due to the many stops and the one-track line. Trains now take 150 minutes between Bützow and Pasewalk, much longer than in 1995. Between Lübeck and Szczecin, the journey takes four hours and 40 minutes; in the opposite direction it takes more than five hours.
