= Kavelstorf station =

Railway station in Germany

Kavelstorf Kavelstorf (Kr Rostock)
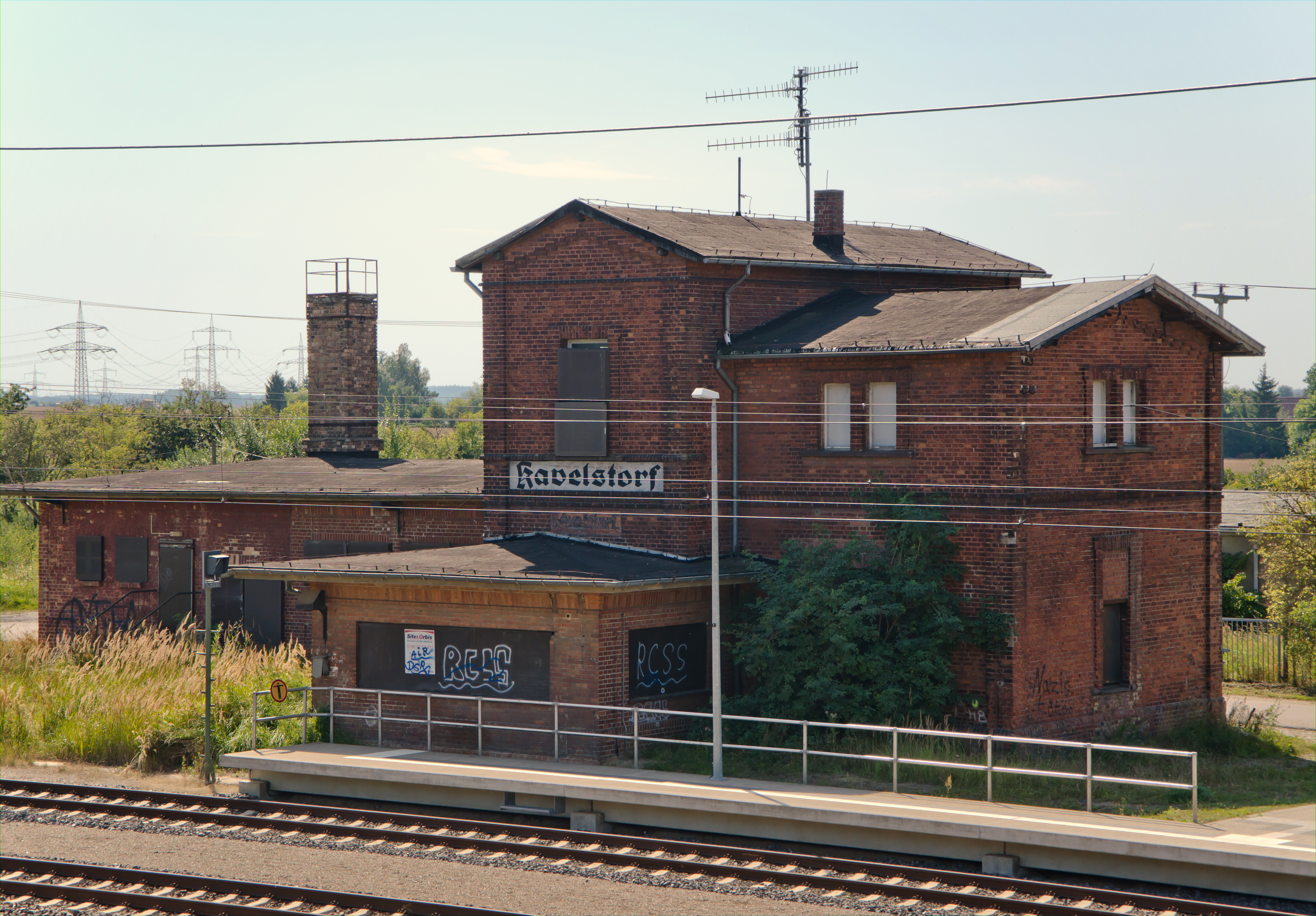
- 2012

General information
- Location: Bahnhofstraße 1; 18196 Kavelstorf; Mecklenburg-Vorpommern; Germany
- Coordinates: 54°00′27″N 12°11′50″E
- Owner: DB Netz
- Operator: DB Station&Service
- Lines: Neustrelitz–Warnemünde railway (KBS 205); Rostock–Rostock Seehafen Nord railway (KBS 183)
- Platforms: 1 side platform
- Tracks: 3
- Train operators: DB Regio Nordost

Other information
- Station code: 3146
- DS100 code: WKV
- IBNR: 8012002
- Category: 7
- Website: www.bahnhof.de

Services
Preceding station	Rostock S-Bahn	Following station
Rostock Hbf towards Warnemünde	S3	Scharstorf towards Güstrow
Location
- Location within Mecklenburg-Vorpommern Location within Germany Location within Europe

Kavelstorf station is a railway station in the municipality of Kavelstorf, located in the Rostock district in Mecklenburg-Vorpommern, Germany.
