= Kronskamp station =

Railway station in Germany

Kronskamp

General information
- Location: Graf-Zeppelin-Ring; 18299 Laage; Mecklenburg-Vorpommern; Germany
- Coordinates: 53°56′01″N 12°18′54″E
- Owner: DB Netz
- Operator: DB Station&Service
- Lines: Neustrelitz–Warnemünde railway (KBS 205)
- Platforms: 2 side platforms
- Tracks: 2
- Train operators: DB Regio Nordost

Other information
- Station code: 3429
- DS100 code: WKRP
- IBNR: 8012109
- Category: 6
- Website: www.bahnhof.de

Services
| Preceding station | Rostock S-Bahn | Following station |
|---|---|---|
| Scharstorf towards Warnemünde | S3 | Laage (Meckl) towards Güstrow |
Location
- Location within Mecklenburg-Vorpommern

Kronskamp station is a railway station in the Kronskamp district in the municipality of Laage, located in the Rostock district in Mecklenburg-Vorpommern, Germany.
