= Subzin-Liessow station =

Railway station in Germany

Subzin-Liessow

General information
- Location: Breesener Chaussee 11; 18299 Laage; Mecklenburg-Vorpommern; Germany
- Coordinates: 53.8917°N 12.3477°E
- Owner: DB Netz
- Operator: DB Station&Service
- Lines: Neustrelitz–Warnemünde railway (KBS 205)
- Platforms: 2 side platforms
- Tracks: 2
- Train operators: DB Regio Nordost

Other information
- Station code: 6093
- DS100 code: WSBN
- IBNR: 8013072
- Category: 7
- Website: www.bahnhof.de

History
- Opened: before 1911
- Electrified: 18 May 1985; 41 years ago

Services
Preceding station	Rostock S-Bahn	Following station
Laage (Meckl) towards Warnemünde	S3	Plaaz towards Güstrow
Location
- Location within Mecklenburg-Vorpommern

Subzin-Liessow station is a railway station in the Subzin-Liessow district in the municipality of Laage, located in the Rostock district in Mecklenburg-Vorpommern, Germany.
