= Scharstorf station =

Railway station in Germany

Scharstorf

General information
- Location: Am Bahnhof 2; 18196 Prisannewitz/Scharstorf; Mecklenburg-Vorpommern; Germany
- Coordinates: 53°58′12″N 12°14′46″E
- Owner: DB Netz
- Operator: DB Station&Service
- Lines: Neustrelitz–Warnemünde railway (KBS 205)
- Platforms: 2 side platforms
- Tracks: 2
- Train operators: DB Regio Nordost

Other information
- Station code: 5547
- DS100 code: WST
- IBNR: 8012856
- Category: 7
- Website: www.bahnhof.de

History
- Opened: before 1911
- Electrified: 18 May 1985; 41 years ago

Services
Preceding station	Rostock S-Bahn	Following station
Kavelstorf (Kr Rostock) towards Warnemünde	S3	Kronskamp towards Güstrow
Location
- Location within Mecklenburg-Vorpommern Location within Germany Location within Europe

Scharstorf station is a railway station in the Scharstorf district in the municipality of Prisannewitz, located in the Rostock district in Mecklenburg-Vorpommern, Germany.
