= Laage (Meckl) station =

Railway station in Mecklenburg-Vorpommern, Germany

Laage (Meckl)

General information
- Location: Bahnhofstraße 33; 18299 Laage; Mecklenburg-Vorpommern; Germany
- Coordinates: 53°55′10″N 12°20′23″E
- Owner: DB Netz
- Operator: DB Station&Service
- Lines: Neustrelitz–Warnemünde railway (KBS 205)
- Platforms: 1 side platform
- Tracks: 4
- Train operators: DB Regio Nordost

Other information
- Station code: 3485
- DS100 code: WLA
- IBNR: 8012143
- Category: 7
- Website: www.bahnhof.de

History
- Opened: 1 June 1886; 140 years ago
- Electrified: 18 May 1985; 41 years ago

Services
Preceding station	Rostock S-Bahn	Following station
Kronskamp towards Warnemünde	S3	Subzin-Liessow towards Güstrow
Location
- Location within Mecklenburg-Vorpommern Location within Germany Location within Europe

Laage (Meckl) station is a railway station in the municipality of Laage, located in the Rostock district in Mecklenburg-Vorpommern, Germany.

The station was opened in 1886 as simply Laage station, and adopted its current name in the early-1930s. There is also a branch line to the air base where Jagdgeschwader 73 is based, which was renovated in 2021.

== Notable places nearby ==
- Rostock–Laage Airport (approx. 1 km away)
