= Papendorf station =

Railway station in Germany

Papendorf

General information
- Location: Bekegrund; 18059 Papendorf; Mecklenburg-Vorpommern; Germany
- Coordinates: 54°02′12″N 12°08′15″E
- Owner: Deutsche Bahn
- Operator: DB Station&Service
- Lines: Bad Kleinen–Rostock railway (KBS 100)
- Platforms: 2 side platforms
- Tracks: 2
- Train operators: DB Regio Nordost
- Connections: S2

Construction
- Parking: yes
- Cycle facilities: yes
- Accessible: partly

Other information
- Station code: 4858
- DS100 code: WPF
- IBNR: 8012603
- Category: 6
- Fare zone: VVW
- Website: www.bahnhof.de

History
- Opened: before 1911
- Electrified: 18 December 1985; 40 years ago

Services
Preceding station	Rostock S-Bahn	Following station
Rostock Hbf towards Warnemünde	S2	Pölchow towards Güstrow
Location
- Location within Mecklenburg-Vorpommern Location within Germany Location within Europe

Papendorf station is a railway station in the municipality of Papendorf, located in the Rostock district in Mecklenburg-Vorpommern, Germany.
