= Plaaz station =

Railway station in Germany

Plaaz
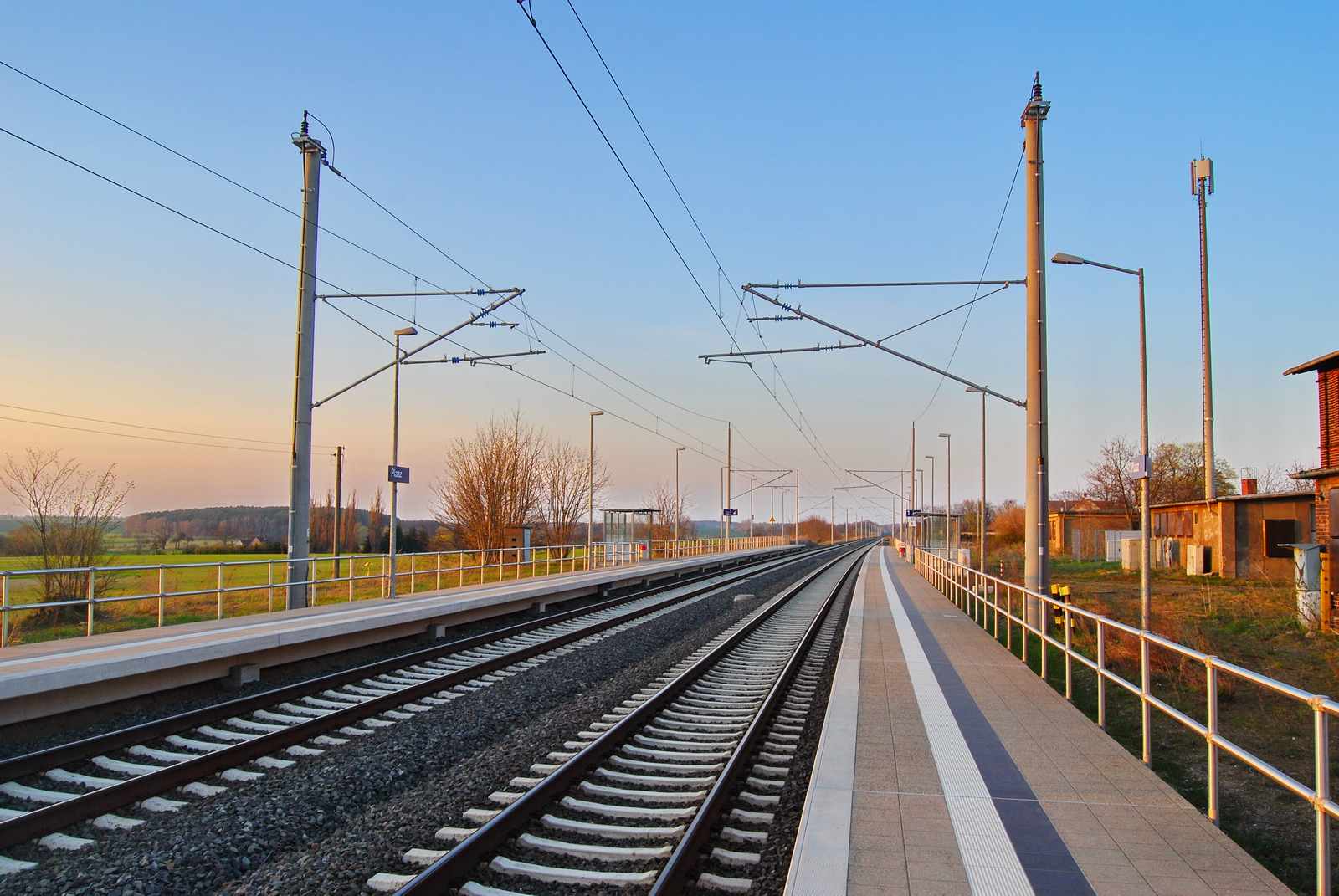
- 2010

General information
- Location: L14/Dorfstraße; 18279 Plaaz; Mecklenburg-Vorpommern; Germany
- Coordinates: 53°50′27″N 12°20′17″E
- Owner: DB Netz
- Operator: DB Station&Service
- Lines: Neustrelitz–Warnemünde railway (KBS 205); Priemerburg–Plaaz railway (KBS 187)
- Platforms: 2 side platforms
- Tracks: 2
- Train operators: DB Regio Nordost

Other information
- Station code: 4947
- DS100 code: WPZ
- IBNR: 8010273
- Category: 6
- Website: www.bahnhof.de

Services
Preceding station	Rostock S-Bahn	Following station
Subzin-Liessow towards Warnemünde	S3	Priemerburg towards Güstrow
Location
- Location within Mecklenburg-Vorpommern

Plaaz station is a railway station in the municipality of Plaaz, located in the Rostock district in Mecklenburg-Vorpommern, Germany.
