= Pölchow station =

German railway station

Pölchow
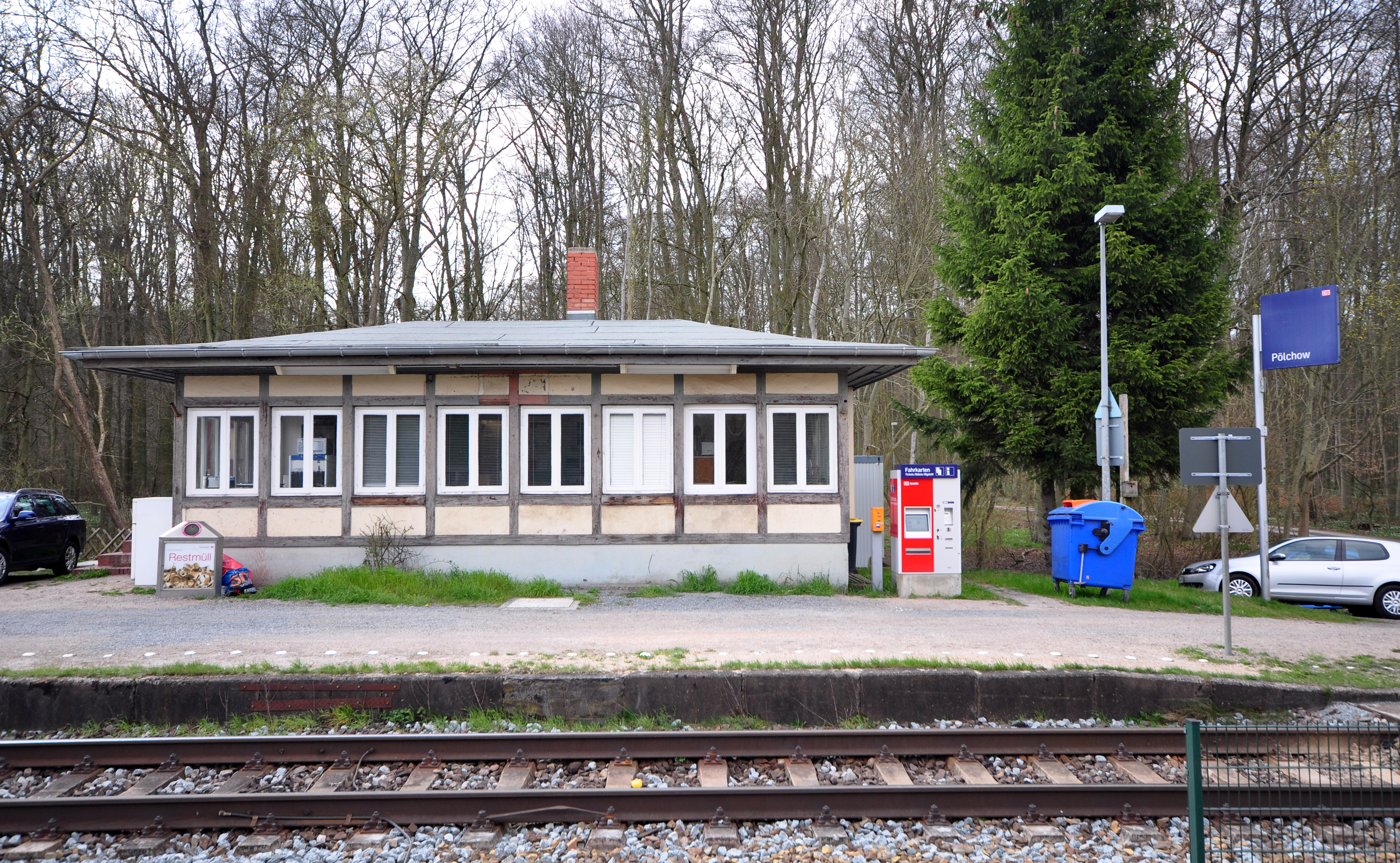
- 2012

General information
- Location: Bahnhofsweg; 18059 Pölchow; Mecklenburg-Vorpommern; Germany
- Coordinates: 54°00′40″N 12°07′17″E
- Owner: Deutsche Bahn
- Operator: DB Station&Service
- Lines: Bad Kleinen–Rostock railway (KBS 100)
- Platforms: 2 side platforms
- Tracks: 2
- Train operators: DB Regio Nordost
- Connections: S2

Construction
- Parking: yes
- Cycle facilities: no
- Accessible: yes

Other information
- Station code: 4982
- DS100 code: WPOE
- IBNR: 8012654
- Category: 6
- Fare zone: VVW
- Website: www.bahnhof.de

Services
| Preceding station | Rostock S-Bahn | Following station |
|---|---|---|
| Papendorf towards Warnemünde | S2 | Huckstorf towards Güstrow |
Location
- Location within Mecklenburg-Vorpommern Location within Germany Location within Europe

Pölchow station is a railway station in the municipality of Pölchow, located in the Rostock district in Mecklenburg-Vorpommern, Germany.

== Notable places nearby ==
- Warnow
