= Priemerburg station =

Railway station in Germany

Priemerburg
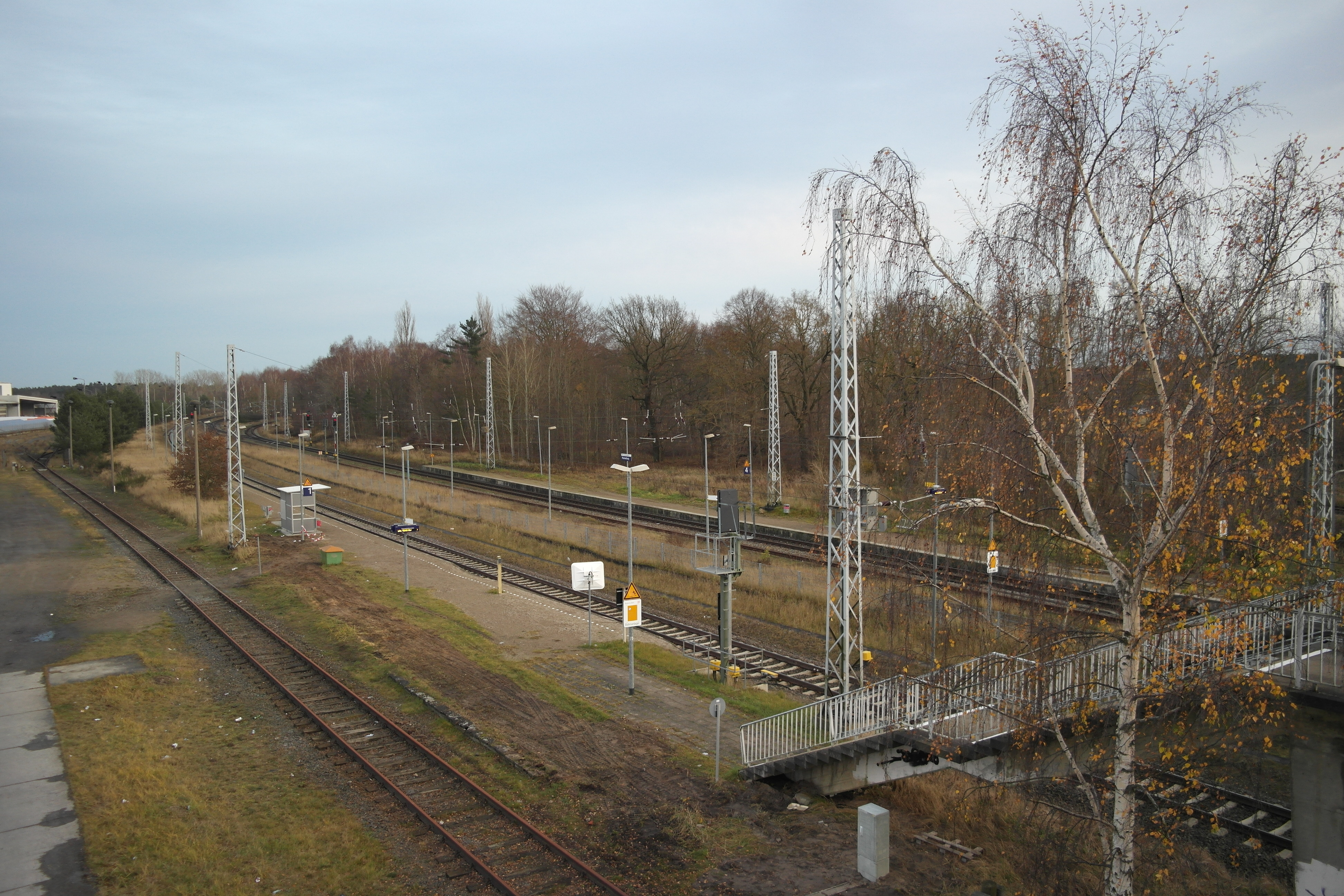
- 2012

General information
- Location: Glasewitzer Chaussee; 18273 Güstrow; Mecklenburg-Vorpommern; Germany
- Coordinates: 53.7959°N 12.2230°E
- Owner: DB Netz
- Operator: DB Station&Service
- Lines: Bützow–Szczecin railway (KBS 175); Priemerburg–Plaaz railway (KBS 187); Güstrow–Meyenburg railway
- Platforms: 2 side platforms
- Tracks: 3
- Train operators: DB Regio Nordost

Other information
- Station code: 5034
- DS100 code: WPI
- IBNR: 8010284
- Category: 6
- Website: www.bahnhof.de

Services
Preceding station	DB Regio Nordost	Following station
Güstrow towards Bützow	RE 4	Lalendorf towards Szczecin Główny or Ueckermünde Stadthafen
Preceding station	Rostock S-Bahn	Following station
Plaaz towards Warnemünde	S3	Güstrow Terminus
Location
- Location within Mecklenburg-Vorpommern Location within Germany Location within Europe

Priemerburg station is a railway station in the Primerburg district of the municipality of Güstrow, located in the Rostock district in Mecklenburg-Vorpommern, Germany.

== Trivia ==
Priemerburg station is written in all documents by Deutsche Bahn in this form, although the corresponding district is officially called Primerburg.
