= Langhagen station =

Railway station in Germany

Langhagen
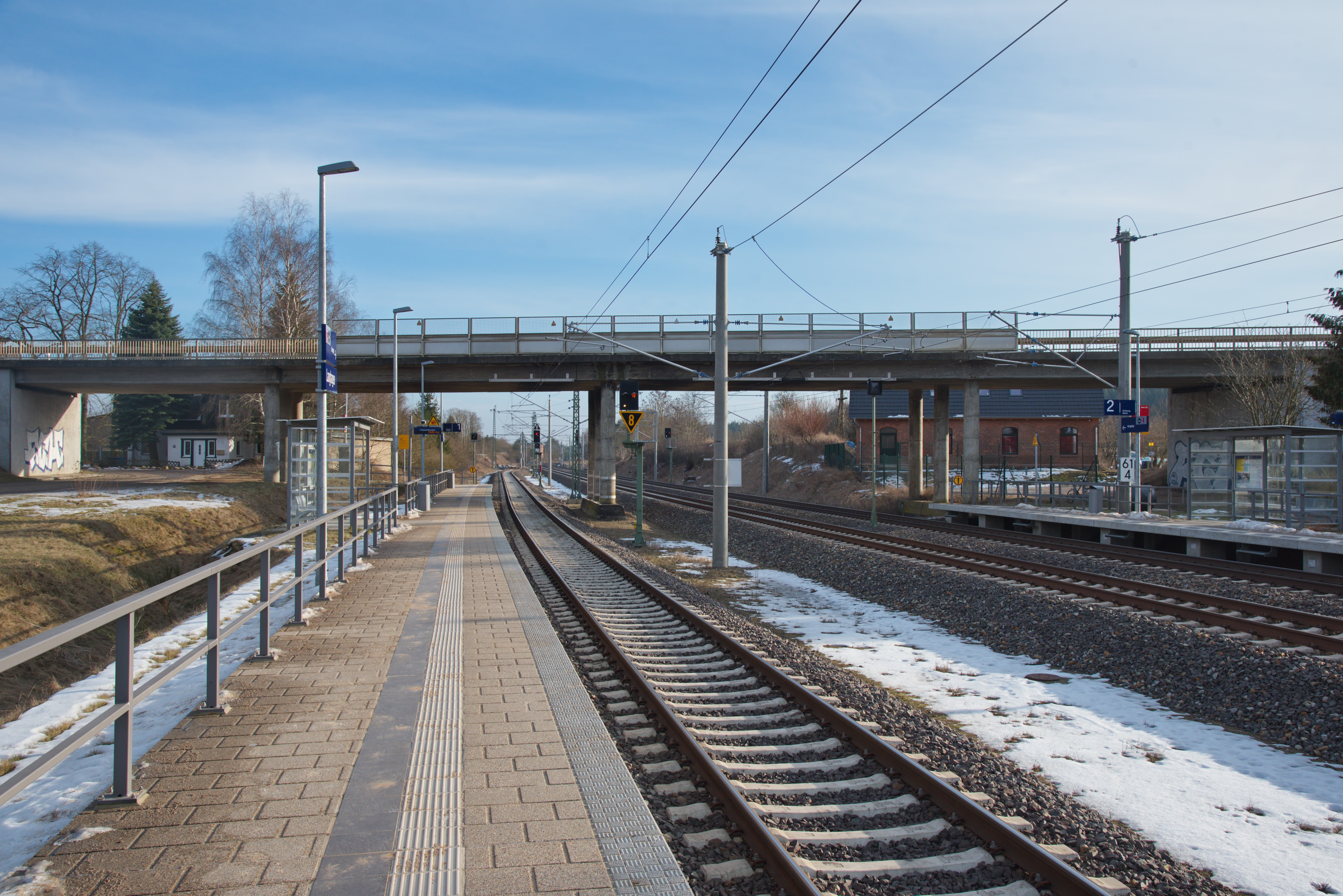
- 2017

General information
- Location: Am Bahnhof; 18279 Langhagen; Mecklenburg-Vorpommern; Germany
- Coordinates: 53.6811°N 12.4256°E
- Owner: Deutsche Bahn
- Operator: DB Station&Service
- Lines: Neustrelitz–Warnemünde railway (KBS 205)
- Platforms: 2 side platforms
- Tracks: 3
- Train operators: DB Regio Nordost

Other information
- Station code: 3559
- DS100 code: WLG
- IBNR: 8010201
- Category: 7
- Website: www.bahnhof.de

History
- Opened: 31 March 1961; 65 years ago
- Electrified: 30 April 1985; 41 years ago

Services
Preceding station	DB Regio Nordost	Following station
Güstrow towards Rostock Hbf	RE 5	Waren (Müritz) towards Berlin Südkreuz
Güstrow towards Rostock Hbf	RE 50	Waren (Müritz) towards Neustrelitz Hbf
Location
- Location within Mecklenburg-Vorpommern Location within Germany Location within Europe

Langhagen station is a railway station in the municipality of Langhagen, located in the Rostock district in Mecklenburg-Vorpommern, Germany.
