= Franz Susemihl =

German classical philologist (1826–1901)

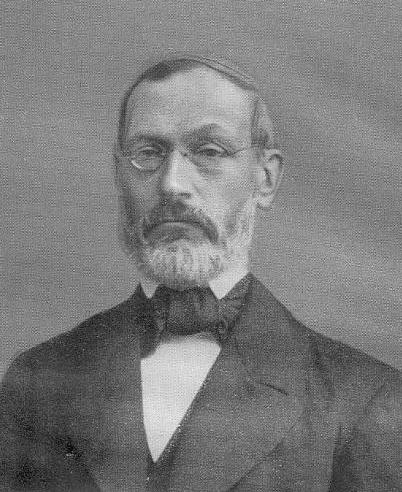
Franz Susemihl (1826–1901)

Franz Susemihl (December 10, 1826 – April 30, 1901) was a German classical philologist born in Laage.

He studied ancient languages in Leipzig and Berlin, and from 1848 taught classes at the Domgymnasium in Güstrow. In 1852 he received his habilitation at the University of Greifswald, where in 1863 he became a full professor of classical philology. In 1875-76 he was rector at the university.

Susemihl is largely remembered through his writings on Plato and Aristotle. Among his better written efforts are "Die genetische Entwickelung der platonischen Philosophie" (Genetic development of Platonic philosophy, 1855–60), and a treatise on the history of Alexandrian literature titled "Geschichte der griechischen Litteratur in der Alexandrinerzeit" (1892). Susemihl died on April 30, 1901, in Florence, Italy.

== Partial bibliography ==
- "Die Lehre des Aristoteles vom Wesen des Staats und der verschiedenen Staatsformen. Ein Vortrag". Greifswald (1867) – The teaching of Aristotle on the nature of the state and various civics.
- "Die genetische Entwickelung der Platonischen Philosophie einleitend dargestellt..", B. G. Teubner, Leipzig (1855–1860; first part in 1855), second part's first half in 1857) – The genetic evolution of Platonic philosophy.
- "Die Geschichte der griechischen Litteratur in der Alexandrinerzeit", two volumes; B. G. Teubner, Leipzig, (first volume 1891, second volume 1892) – The history of Greek literature in the Alexandrian Era.
