= Rostock S-Bahn =

Railway network in Rostock, Germany

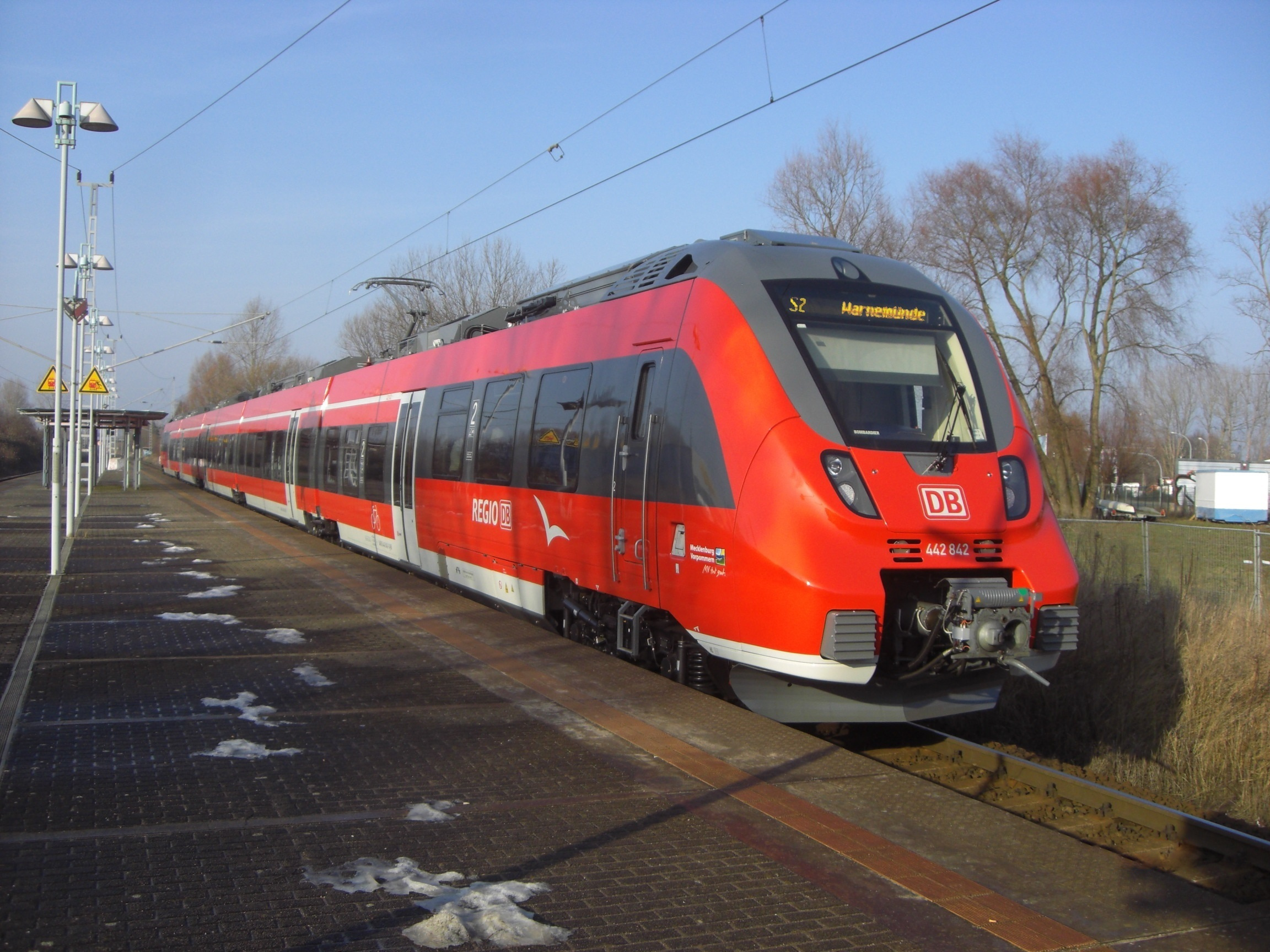

Overview
- Locale: Rostock, Mecklenburg-Vorpommern, Germany
- Transit type: S-train
- Number of lines: 3
- Number of stations: 26

Operation
- Began operation: 28 September 1974
- Operator: DB Regio Nordost

Technical
- System length: 90.7 km (56.36 mi)
System map

The Rostock S-Bahn (German: S-Bahn Rostock) is a S-Bahn (suburban railway) network in Rostock in the German state of Mecklenburg-Vorpommern. It consists of three lines with a total length of about 90 km. Line S1 runs from Rostock Hauptbahnhof (main station) to Warnemünde within the Rostock urban area. S-Bahn operations started on 28 September 1974. Later, the lines to the north-east to the port (Seehafen) of Rostock and to the south to the town of Güstrow via Schwaan were included in the S-Bahn network. The line to the port was discontinued in 2012, but at same time the line to Güstrow via Laage was included as line S3 of the S-Bahn. Until 2014 the rolling stock mainly consisted of push–pull trains with Waggonbau Görlitz double-deck coaches. Since then all lines have been operated with new Bombardier Talent 2 railcars.

== Lines ==
Line S1 runs west of the Unterwarnow from Warnemünde through the built-up areas of Lichtenhagen, Lütten Klein, Evershagen and through the industrial areas of Marienehe and Bramow between Kröpeliner-Tor-Vorstadt and Hansaviertel to Rostock Hauptbahnhof, located in the south of the Steintor-Vorstadt. This line runs over part of the Lloyd Railway.

Line S2 also begins in Warnemünde and follows the route of the line S1, but continues through the Hauptbahnhof through the southern suburbs of Rostock. It crosses the Warnow at Schwaan and continues to Güstrow. This line runs over parts of the Lloyd Railway and the Bad Kleinen–Rostock railway and over the Güstrow–Schwaan railway.

Line S3 also begins in Warnemünde and follows the Lloyd Railway in a southerly direction via Laage and the Priemerburg–Plaaz railway to Güstrow.

=== Route layout ===
Line	Stops	Length in km	Travel time	Stations
S1	10	13.3	20	Warnemünde - Warnemünde Werft - R.-Lichtenhagen - R.-Lütten Klein - R.-Evershagen - R.-Marienehe - R.-Bramow - R.-Holbeinplatz - R.-Parkstraße - Rostock Hauptbahnhof
S2	17	47,6	58	Warnemünde - Warnemünde Werft - R.-Lichtenhagen - R.-Lütten Klein - R.-Evershagen - R.-Marienehe - R.-Bramow - R.-Holbeinplatz - R.-Parkstraße - Rostock Hauptbahnhof - Papendorf - Pölchow - Huckstorf - Schwaan - Mistorf - Lüssow - Güstrow
S3	18	58.1	74	Warnemünde - Warnemünde Werft - R.-Lichtenhagen - R.-Lütten Klein - R.-Evershagen - R.-Marienehe – R.-Bramow - R. Holbeinplatz - R. Parkstraße - Rostock Hauptbahnhof - Kavelstorf - Scharstorf - Kronskamp - Laage - Subzin-Liessow - Plaaz - Priemerburg - Güstrow

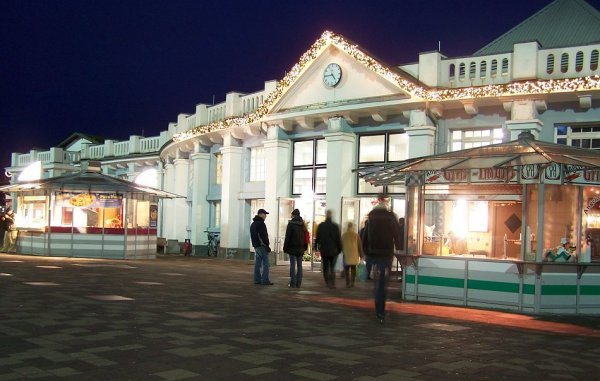
Rostock Hbf

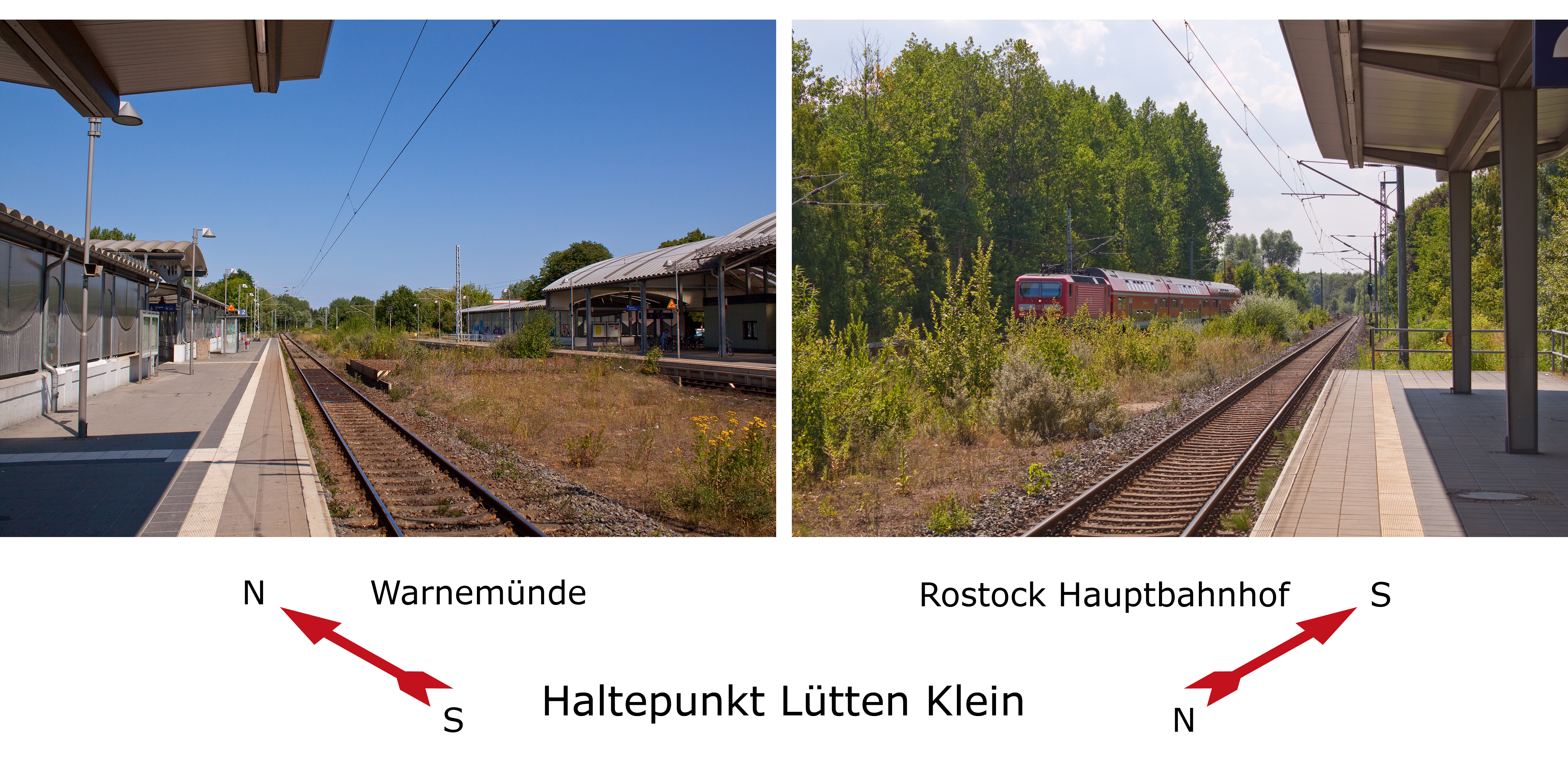
Looking in both directions at Lütten Klein station

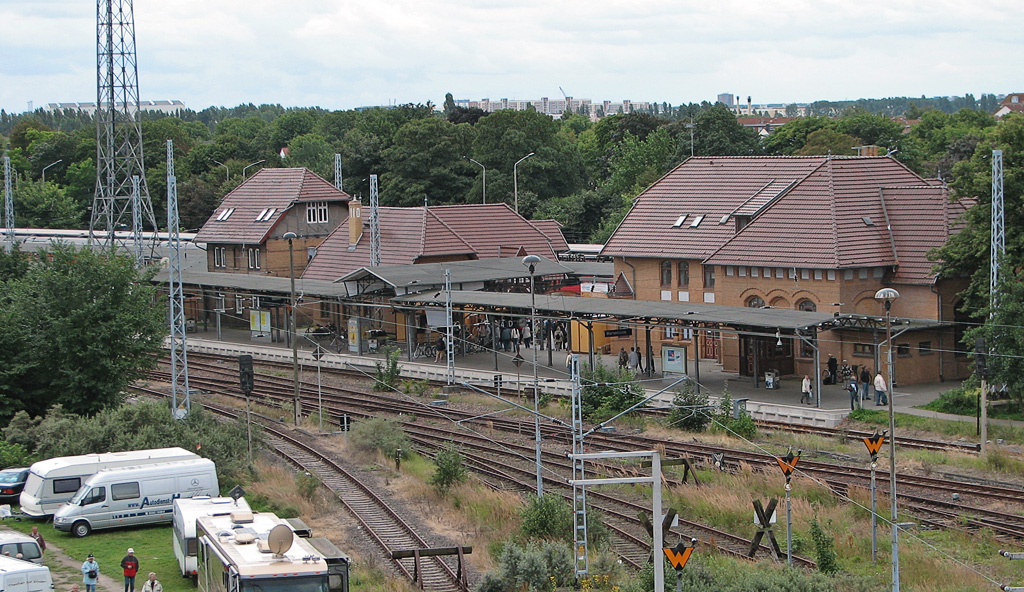
Warnemünde station, lines S1, S2 and S3 end here

== History ==
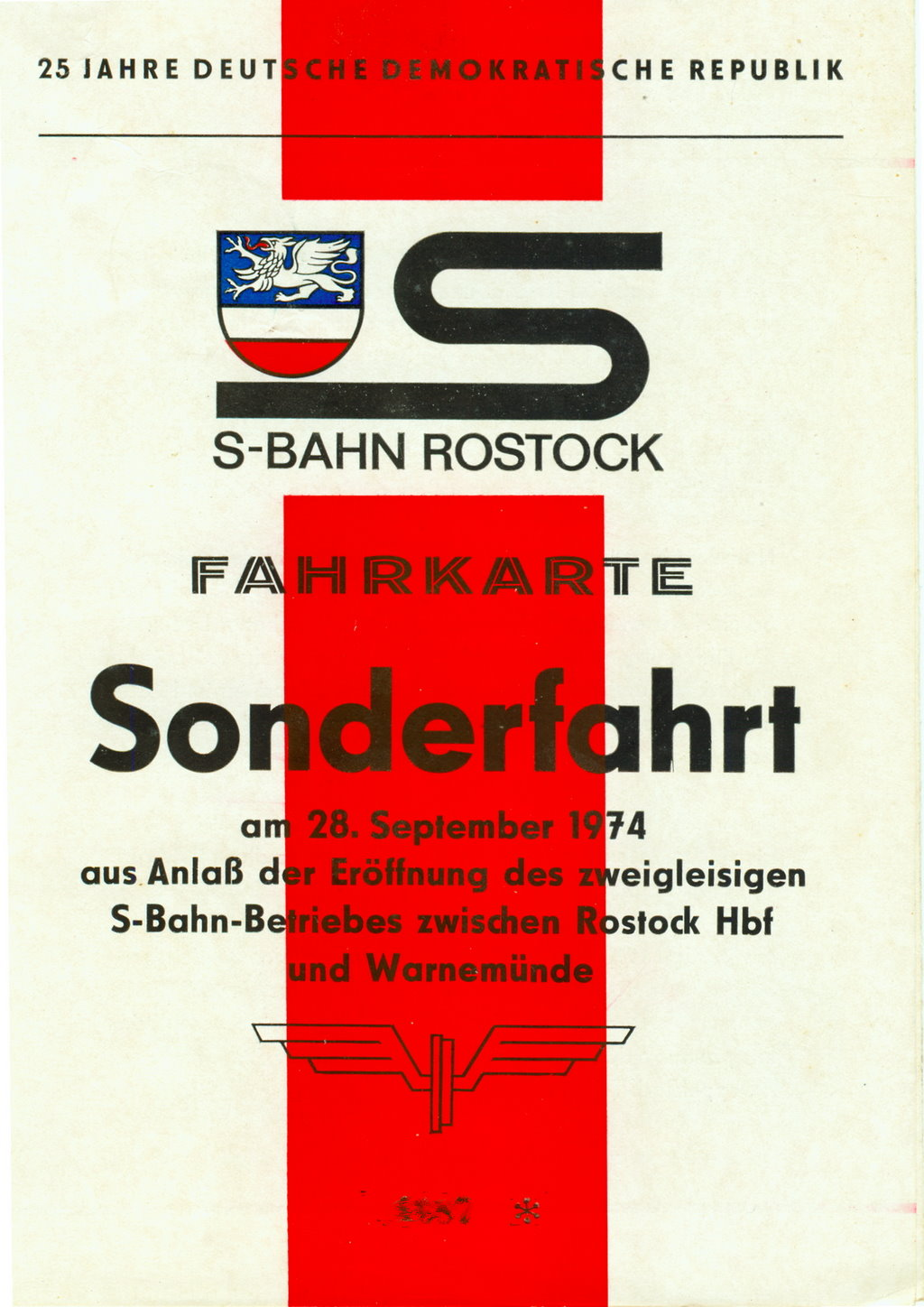
Special ticket at the opening of the S-Bahn

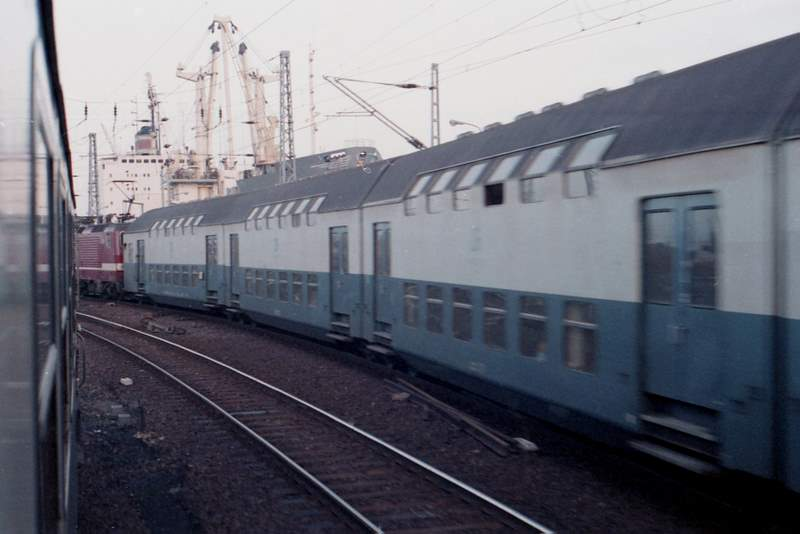
A push-pull train at Warnemünde in 1987, with permanently coupled sets

There has long been dense suburban traffic on the line between Rostock Hauptbahnhof and the seaside resort of Warnemünde. The route has been favoured since 1923 by cheap day return fares. The temporary suspension of these fares in 1953 led to protests by the workers of the Warnow shipyard, so a few weeks later the old fares were restored. Construction of new housing developments along this section began to strengthen the importance of this route in the 1960s.

The existing line via Schmarl was considered to be too far away from the oldest and largest of these development areas, Lütten Klein, although more new housing estates were planned on the line. In the 1960s, a route to the west of the urban motorway to Warnemünde was considered initially, but these plans were not pursued because of the high construction costs. Instead, construction began in 1968 on a line on the east side of the motorway. First, a branch line was opened on 12 July 1970 from Bramow to Lütten Klein to connect the residential area with the city centre and the port area. From Bramow to Evershagen the line ran next to the main line to Warnemünde in the position of the former second track. On this day a simplified fare system also went into force, borrowing from the fare structures of other urban railways. A trip from Rostock to Warnemunde cost 50 Pfennig, while for shorter distances the normal Deutsche Reichsbahn fare applied.

The route to Lütten Klein was extended in the following years to the north and reconnected to the old track south of Warnow-Werft station. With the completion of this new line in 1974, it was officially declared to be an S-Bahn line (now S1) and the previously irregular services were harmonised. The old line through Schmarl station was decommissioned.

Electric operations began on the Rostock S-Bahn on 14 December 1985. Trains consisted of push–pull trains with three double-deck coaches in the peak hour, propelled by class 118 locomotives from the electrification and later by class 243 locomotives.

The line to the port of Rostock was not then considered an S-Bahn line, even though all the services on the line started or ended at Warnemünde. S-Bahn fares were introduced on the line to the port in 1987. The line to the port was officially designated as an S-Bahn line in 1988.

From 1982 several S-Bahn trains from Warnemünde to Rostock continued to the fertilizer plant in Poppendorf. These trains operated only in the peak hour trains and the operation to the east of Rostock was not shown in the public timetables. These services stopped in 1992.

After Die Wende (the change) in the 1990s, the volume of traffic during the peak hour fell as, on the one hand, most large companies reduced staff or were closed and, on the other, the residential areas along the S-Bahn line lost population. The train lengths were gradually shortened until sets consisted of only three double-decker cars. In 2002, the 7.5-minute intervals during peak hour were thinned to 10-minute intervals. Also since the 1990s, the local trains from Güstrow to Rostock have been referred to as S-Bahn trains and run through to Warnemünde. Planning aimed at linking the S-Bahn network with the Rostock tram network to create a Stadtbahn were abandoned in 2007.

In 2009, the state of Mecklenburg-Vorpommern developed plans to operate a "Warnow" network, which in addition to the Rostock S-Bahn would include the Wismar–Rostock–Tessin, the (Bad Doberan)–Rostock–Graal-Müritz and the Wismar–Ludwigslust lines. DB Regio Nordost won the bid and will remain the operator of Rostock S-Bahn and will also take over the operation of the Rostock–Laage–Güstrow route. From the timetable change in 2012, this line was added to the S-Bahn network and operated as line S3. Between Rostock and Warnemünde trains run in the peak hour every 7.5 minutes and during the non-peak every 15 minutes; on the other sections trains run every 60 minutes from Monday to Friday and on weekends only run every 2 hours.

In mid-May 2012, the Ministry of Energy, Infrastructure and Regional Development of Mecklenburg-Vorpommern announced that in the future line S4 would not run to the port of Rostock. The Rostock City Council contradicted this and called for an extension of the S-Bahn line to the ferry terminal in the port. Nevertheless, passenger services to the port were completely abandoned on 9 December 2012. The stop in Mierdorf (near Güstrow) was also abandoned at the same time.

It was intended that, as of December 2012, all lines would be consistently operated with brand-new, five carriage Bombardier Talent 2 electric railcars, which should replace the old double-deck push-pull trains (lines S1 and S2) and diesel railcars (line S3), but these trains were not yet available at the 2012 timetable change. Services on lines S1 and S2 continued with the old sets, while line S3 was divided into two parts in Rostock (Warnemünde–Rostock Hbf and Rostock Hbf–Laage–Güstrow) with services between Rostock and Güstrow operated with trains of newer bi-level cars hauled by a locomotive.

Since 26 April 2014, all Talent 2 railcars have been available for the S-Bahn and they have completely replaced the loco-hauled trains.

The line S2X only operated for one year and was replaced in December 2024 by the line RE50.

== Rolling stock ==
For a long time services between Rostock and Warnemünde were operated with double-deck push-pull trains. For a period trains were operated with two coupled sets of four double-deck carriages (sharing bogies), but from the mid-1970s trains used in commuter traffic were partly composed of three coupled sets with a total of twelve cars. In the 1980s, the trains were replaced by double-deck carriages with their own bogies, which were modernised in the 1990s and were still in use in 2013.

All lines were operated with push-pull trains with a Class 143 locomotive and two modernised double-deck cars of Deutsche Reichsbahn and a newer double-deck cab car. On special occasions the trains could be extended to a maximum length of five cars (driving trailer, four intermediate cars). All trains possessed first and second class cars. Except for the new double-deck cars on line S3, the cars were marked with the letters "S-Bahn Rostock DB".

Since 9 October 2013, starting with line S3, 23 Bombardier Talent 2 electric multiple units have gradually replaced the old double-deck railcars. On 26 April 2014, the conversion was complete. Since then only the Talent 2 railcars run across the network. Class 143 locomotives hauling the only two remaining double-deck cars substitute when required.

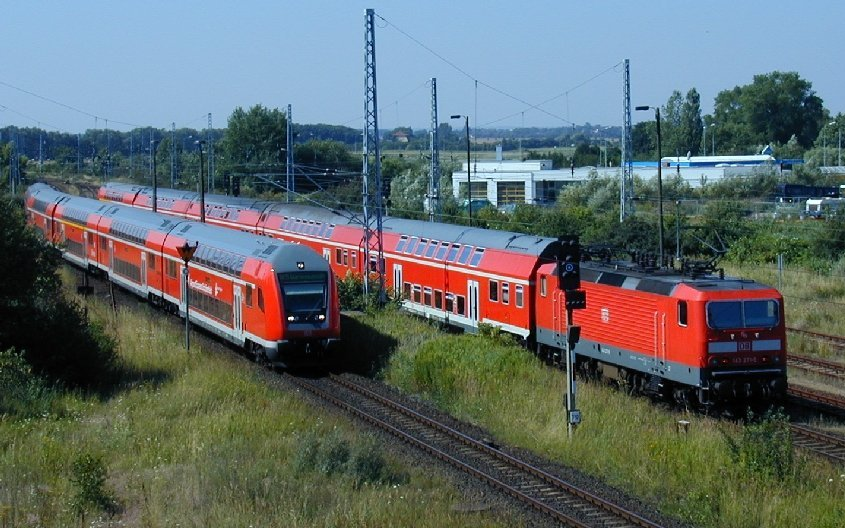
Push-pull train of the Rostock S-Bahn (right) in Warnemünde Werft

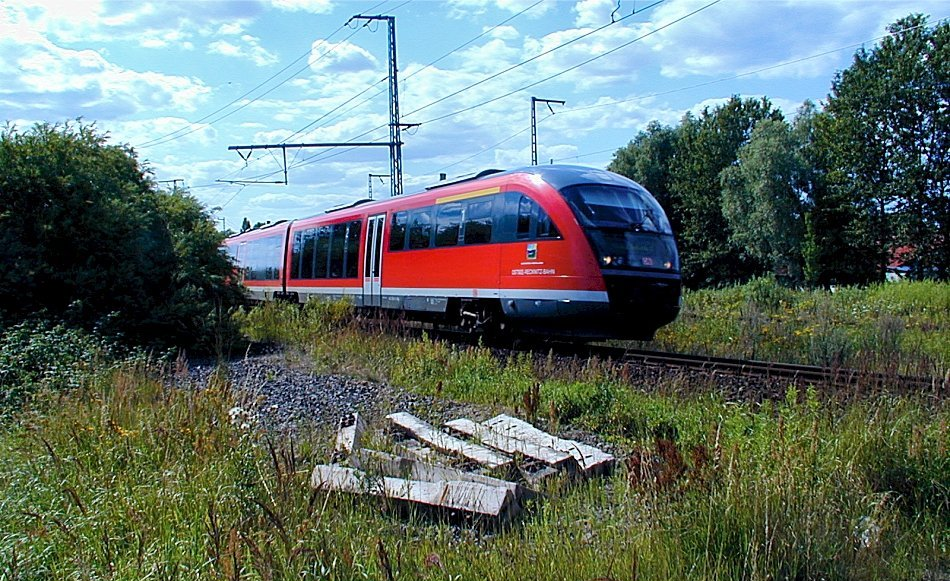
Class 642 DMU on the former line S3

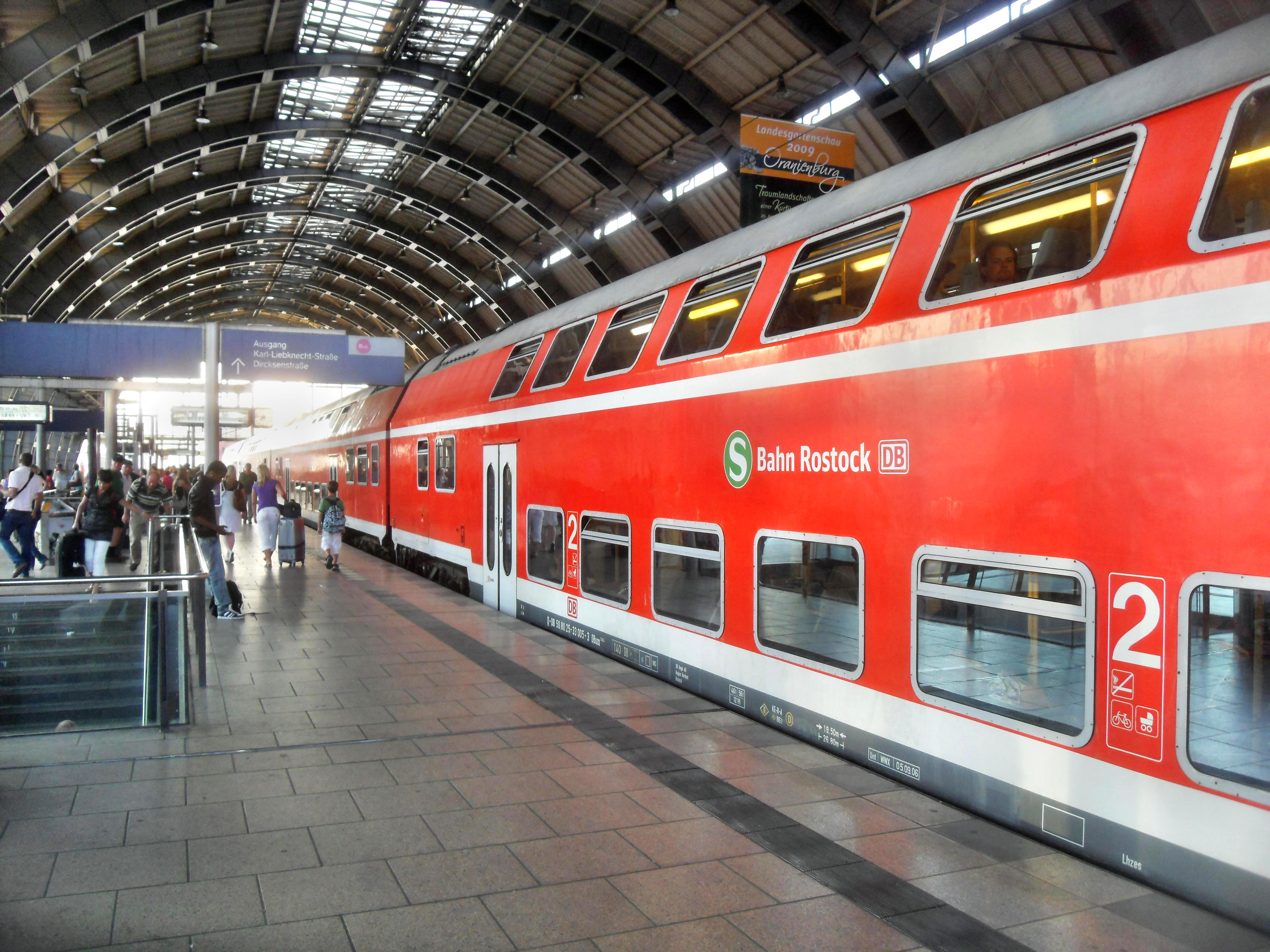
Rostock S-Bahn carriages temporarily in Berlin Alexanderplatz station

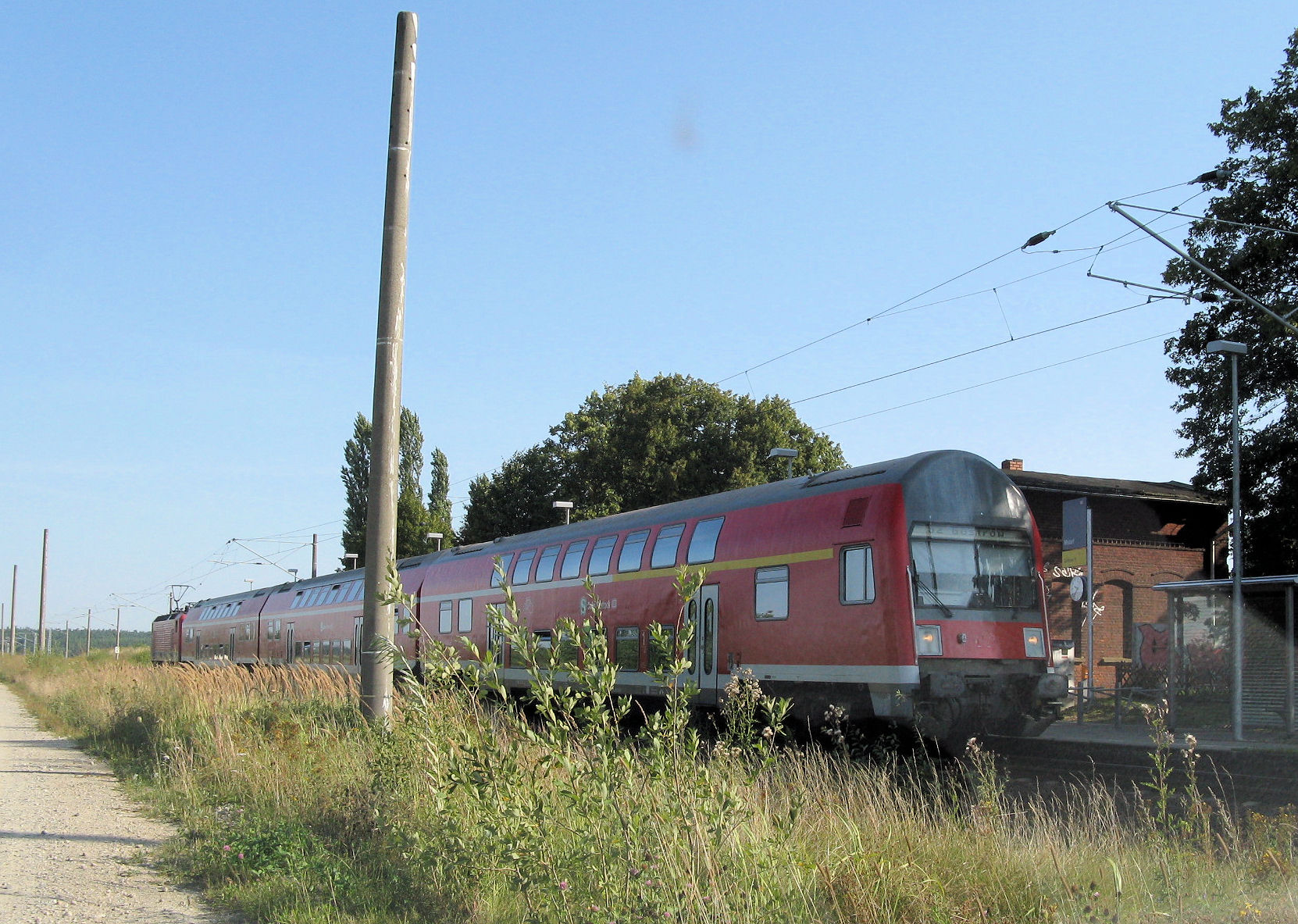
Control car of the Rostock S-Bahn on line S2 in Mistorf

== See also ==
- List of rapid transit systems
