= Rostock–Rostock Seehafen Nord railway =

Railway line in Germany

Rostock/Kavelstorf–Rostock Seehafen Nord railway

Overview
- Line number: 6443 (Rostock–Rostock Seehafen Nord); 6448 (Kavelstorf–Rostock Seehafen)
- Locale: Rostock, Mecklenburg-Vorpommern, Germany

Service
- Route number: 183

Technical
- Track gauge: 1,435 mm (4 ft 8 1/2 in) standard gauge
- Electrification: 15 kV/16.7 Hz AC overhead catenary
- Operating speed: 100 km/h (62.1 mph) (maximum)

The Rostock–Rostock Seehafen Nord railway was opened in the early 1960s from the newly built port then called Rostock Überseehafen (later Rostock Seehafen and officially called Rostock Port in English) on the Breitling in the northeast of the city of Rostock in the German state of Mecklenburg-Vorpommern. The Rostock Seehafen station yard, which is seven kilometres long, is one of the most important freight nodes in Mecklenburg-Vorpommern. A single-track electrified main line, the Kavelstorf–Rostock Seehafen railway, connects the Seehafen yard with the railway towards Berlin.

== History ==
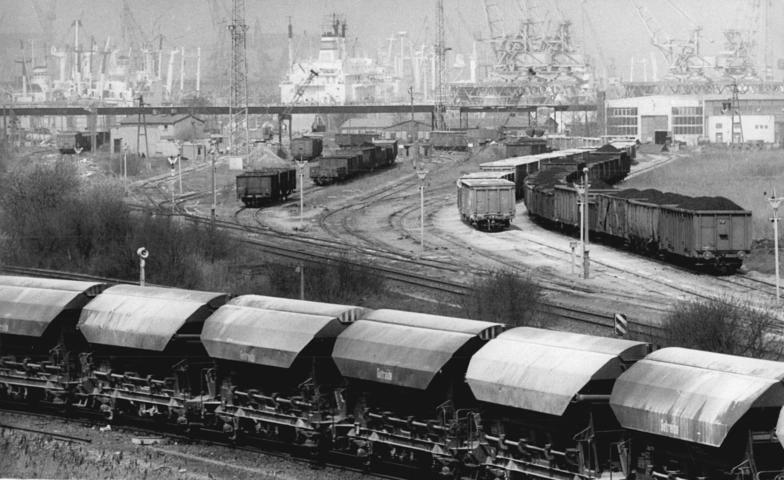
Rostock Seehafen station at the beginning of the tracks to the port (1982)

The importance of Rostock as a port significantly increased in the 1950s, partly as a result of the division of Germany. The harbour in the old city with its quayside railway was no longer able to handle the required level of traffic. A new international port was built in the north-east of the city on the shore of the Breitling and inaugurated in 1960. The construction of a railway connection to it became a central Jugendobjekt (“youth project”, intended to be carried out by youth brigades that were organised by the Free German Youth) called the Hafenbahn ("port railway"). An initially temporary track was laid down in 1958–59 to the port area via Rostock Dierkow and an extension was built that branches from the Stralsund–Rostock railway west of Bentwisch and is part of the current route. The first phase of the port and the port railway went into operation on 30 April 1960.

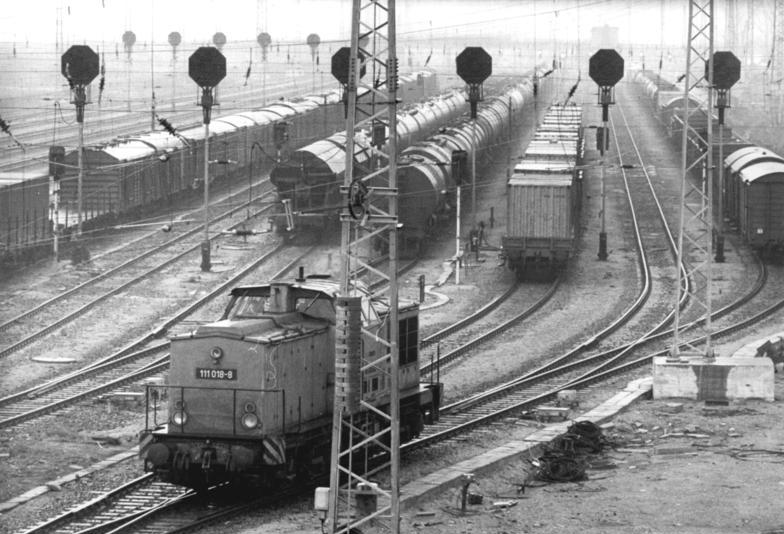
Marshalling yard at Rostock Seehafen station (1986)

In the following years, the network was slowly but steadily expanded and the result was one of the largest railway yards in East Germany, with 240 kilometres of track in 1987. The connecting curve towards Bentwisch was opened in 1963. On 31 May 1964, a direct link was opened towards Kavelstorf on the line to Berlin, which had reopened a few years before. The construction of the line was difficult because of topographical conditions. The embankment rose to a height of up to 24 metres above ground level and 1.5 million cubic metres of earth and about 150,000 cubic metres of peat were moved.

Rail electrification train was taken into operation on 23 November 1985. A record 20 million tonnes of freight was handled at the port in 1989. 95% of it was transported by rail.

After reunification, a large part of the former freight traffic shifted to road. Nevertheless, Rostock Seehafen station remained of great importance for the formation of freight trains. In addition to DB Schenker Rail, private railways also use its facilities. In 2005–2007, a large proportion of the tracks were renewed. In 2007, about 20 percent of the freight volume from the port was handled by rail and it was rising again.

== Passengers ==
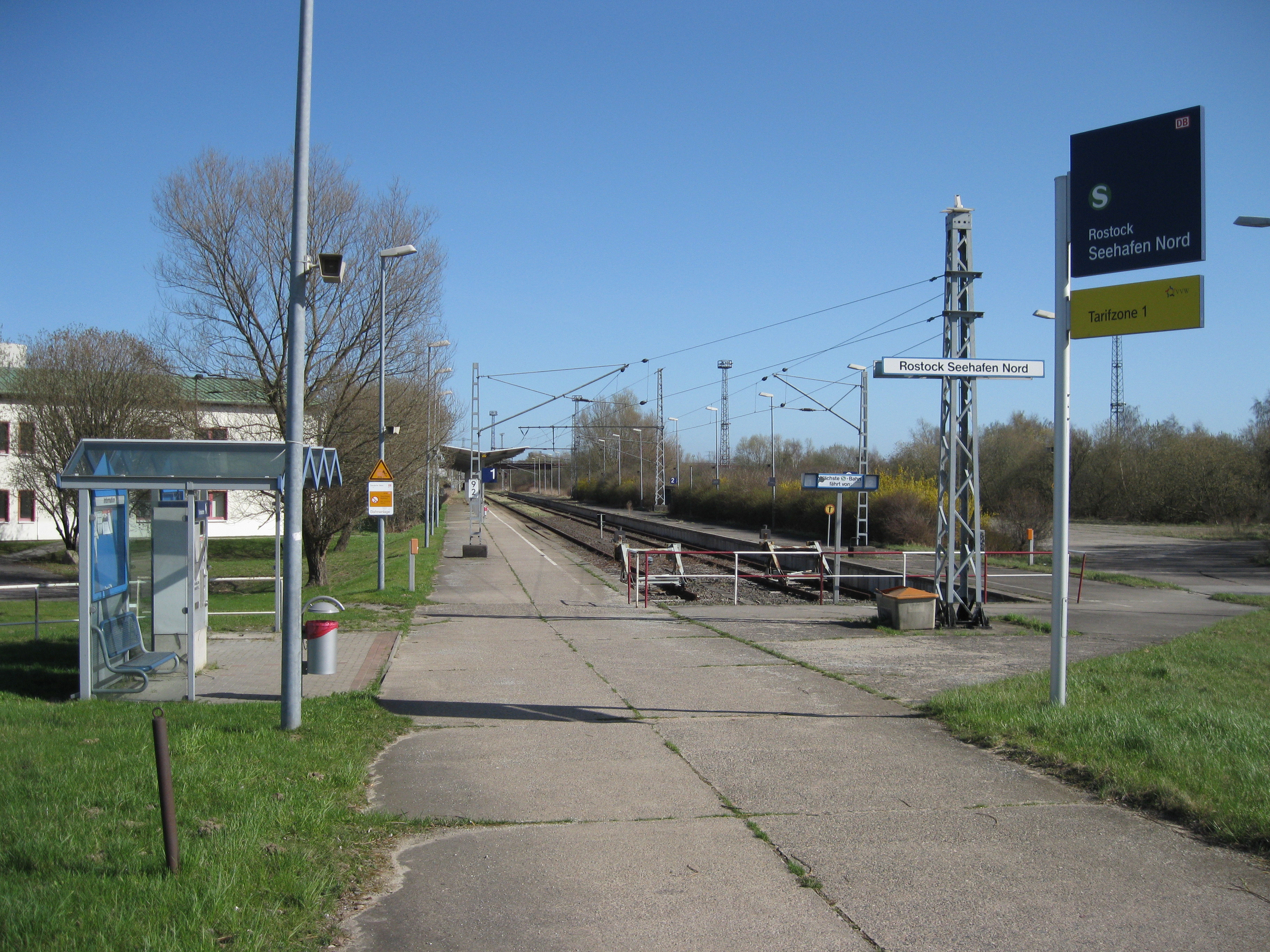
Rostock Seehafen Nord station (2011)

In 1959, a temporary platform was established for commuter traffic, which was replaced in 1969 by the new Überseehafen Nord station (called Seehafen Nord since 1983). In 1968–69, seven pairs of services ran on weekdays and six and five pairs on Saturdays and Sundays to Rostock Hauptbahnhof. With the growth of new residential areas in the north-west of the city, the service was gradually expanded. In 1989, 16 pairs of trains operated daily, three of them on Monday to Friday only. From 1988, the service to Seehafen Nord was officially considered part of the Rostock S-Bahn, which had been established in 1975, and almost all trains now continued on the line to Warnemünde.

The two intermediate stations, Rostock Überseehafen Mitte and Süd were renamed in the early 1970s as Rostock-Toitenwinkel and Dierkow West, but the latter closed a few years later. In 1983, Dierkow station was re-opened just east of the previous station and this was followed by new stations at Hinrichsdorfer Straße in 1988 and Kassebohm in 1990 on the section shared with the line from Stralsund.

In the 1990s, the service has been gradually harmonised with the closing of several existing gaps in the hourly schedule in the morning and provided additional services during the peak hour. After that, services ran approximate hourly. In 2002, the operation of the trains between Rostock Hauptbahnhof and Warnemünde was abandoned due to lower demand. After that time, the S-Bahn services were operated with diesel railcars between the Hauptbahnhof and Seehafen Nord. Officially the reason given for the operation of this rollingstock was that it would continue to the port, providing a direct connection with the terminal of the Scandinavian ferries. This extension never happened.

A curiosity was Rostock Seehafen Bahnbetriebswerk station, which was not shown in the public timetable. The S-Bahn trains stopped there until then end of the service if needed for the workers in the locomotive depot.

Originally it was planned that from December 2012, after of the reorganisation and expansion of the Rostock S-Bahn, the new S4 line would operate from Rostock Seehafen Nord via Rostock Hbf to Warnemünde. In the spring of 2012, it was announced that the Ministry of Energy, Infrastructure and Regional Development of Mecklenburg-Vorpommern had cancelled the rail passenger services to Rostock Seehafen from the timetable change in 2012 due to the massive losses on the route. The Rostock City Council contradicted this and argued for an extension of the S-Bahn to the ferry terminal at the port. This was again rejected by the Ministry. So the cancellation went ahead and, on 8 December 2012, the last S-Bahn services ran to the port.

In addition to the S-Bahn, there were occasional services with car-carrying trains to Seehafen Nord station (including the AZ 1472 service towards Sassnitz ferry port).

== Route ==
The single-track, electrified link from the line from Berlin branches in Kavelstorf and extends northward. It crosses the valley of the Kösterbeck on a high bridge and then crosses the Rostock–Tessin railway. It runs in a cutting on the eastern edge of Rostock Brinckmansdorf and crosses the Stralsund line to the west of Bentwisch.

The line from Rostock port originally branched at Cassebohm junction (not identical to the current Kassebohm station) from the Rostock–Stralsund railway and ran for several kilometres next to the Stralsund line. The junction has since been moved further towards Bentwisch. Trains from the Schwerin line can reach the Stralsund line or the port directly via a connecting curve between the junctions at Dalwitzhof and Warnowbrücke, without having to pass through Rostock Hauptbahnhof.

The tracks from Rostock and Kavelstorf and a connection from the line from Stralsund meet at Rostock Seehafen Süd junction. This is the beginning of the extensive facilities of the Rostock Seehafen yard, which extend for more than seven kilometres to the northwest. There are no roads crossing the freight yard between the B 105 and the port area, except for the resort road to Graal-Müritz.

The route of the former S-Bahn line ran along the southwestern edge of the freight yard next to the housing estates of Dierkow and Toitenwinkel, which were developed in the 1980s. The S-Bahn stops of Dierkow, Hinrichsdorfer Straße, Toitenwinkel and Seehafen Nord were operated as part of Rostock Seehafen station. The actual port area, which was fenced off during East German times and was not accessible to the public, begins at the northwestern end of the line. The terminus of the line at Rostock Seehafen Nord had two platform tracks, only one of which was used at the end of services. The tracks to the terminals in the various sectors of the port separate from the passenger line before Seehafen Nord. The longest siding of five kilometres runs to the east towards the industrial area of Hinrichsdorf.
