= Langhagen =

- Ortsteil of Lalendorf
- Coat of arms
- Interactive map of Langhagen
- Location within Germany Location within Mecklenburg-Vorpommern
- Coordinates: 53°41′N 12°26′E
- Country: Germany
- State: Mecklenburg-Vorpommern
- District: Rostock
- Municipality: Lalendorf

Area
  - Total: 27.17 km^{2} (10.49 sq mi)
- Elevation: 83 m (272 ft)

Population (2012-12-31)
  - Total: 559
  - Density: 20.6/km^{2} (53.3/sq mi)
- Time zone: UTC+01:00 (CET)
  - Summer (DST): UTC+02:00 (CEST)
- Postal codes: 18279
- Dialling codes: 038456
- Vehicle registration: LRO

Langhagen is a village and a former municipality in the Rostock district, in Mecklenburg-Vorpommern, Germany. Since 25 May 2014, it is part of the municipality Lalendorf.
