= Laage =

Town in Mecklenburg-Vorpommern, Germany

- Town
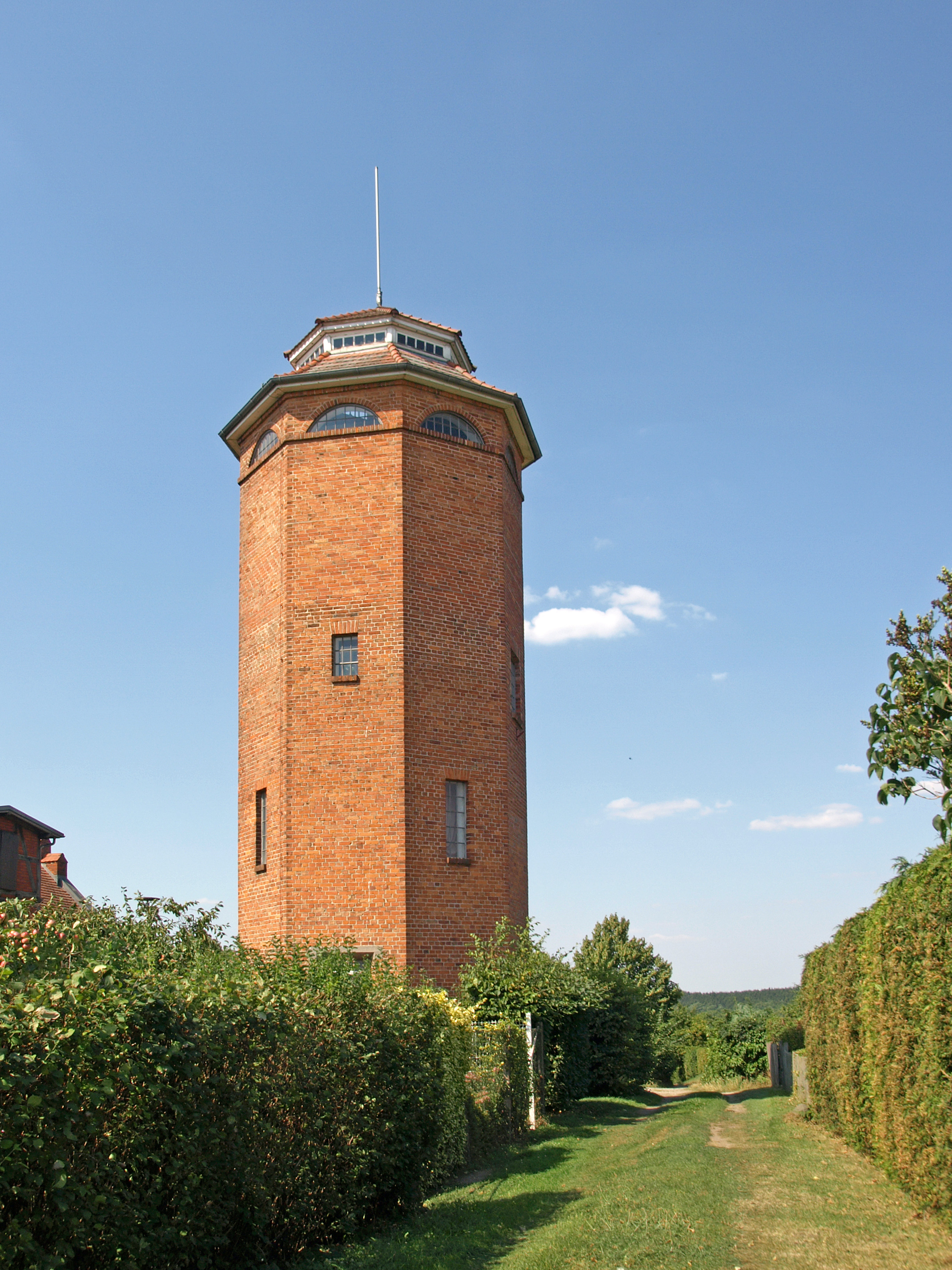
- Laage Water tower

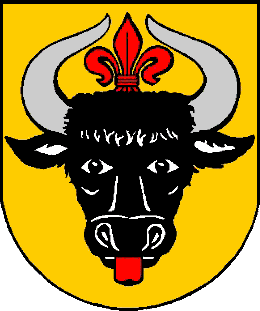
- Coat of arms

- Location of Laage within Rostock district
- Interactive map of Laage
- Location within Germany Location within Mecklenburg-Vorpommern
- Coordinates: 53°55′56″N 12°20′48″E
- Country: Germany
- State: Mecklenburg-Vorpommern
- District: Rostock
- Municipal assoc.: Laage

Government
  - Mayor: Holger Anders

Area
  - Total: 114.9 km^{2} (44.4 sq mi)
- Elevation: 20 m (66 ft)

Population (2025-12-31)
  - Total: 6,289
  - Density: 54.73/km^{2} (141.8/sq mi)
- Time zone: UTC+01:00 (CET)
  - Summer (DST): UTC+02:00 (CEST)
- Postal codes: 18299
- Dialling codes: 038459
- Vehicle registration: LRO
- Website: www.stadt-laage.de

Laage (German pronunciation: [ˈlaːɡə]) is a town in Rostock (district) in Mecklenburg-Vorpommern (Germany). It is situated on the river Recknitz, 23 kilometers southeast of Rostock.

== Geography ==
=== Geographical location ===
Laage lies between the cities Güstrow, Teterow und Rostock on a natural ford along the Recknitz river.

To the west and east of the Recknitz-Urstromtal there are terminal moraines. Der Kalte Berg is 62m above the Normalhöhennull, the tallest point of elevation in the municipal area. Rostock Laage Airport is located a few kilometers west of Laage.

=== Municipal areas ===
The municipal area is made up of the city center Laage and the following areas:

- Alt Diekhof
- Alt Rossewitz
- Breesen
- Diekhof
- Drölitz
- Jahmen
- Klein Lantow
- Knegendorf
- Korleput
- Kritzkow
- Kronskamp
- Liessow
- Lissow
- Lissow-Bau
- Lüningsdorf
- Pölitz
- Schweez
- Striesenow
- Subzin
- Weitendorf

== History ==
=== Name ===
In 1216 Laage was known as Lauena. The original Polabian name changed to Lawe in 1257, and Laue in 1306, then again to Lawe, and finally to Lage in 1622, with the modern common spelling Laage becoming popular in 1726. The wendish Lave could be translated as footbridge or bridge; Laage then being known as the bridge-place over the flowing Recknitz.

=== Early settlement ===
As early as the Mesolithic (around 8000 BCE) there were hunters, gatherers, and fishers settling the fertile area. Remains from the Neolithic period (around 4500 BCE to 1800 BCE) and the Bronze Age (1800 BCE to 70 BCE) have also been documented. A burial mound near Goritz is an example of a discovery form the late Bronze Age. Prior to the departure of migrations, the region was inhabited by Germanic peoples.

=== Middle ages ===
In the early middle ages there was a slavonic castle and fortified settlement. Paths made out of planks and gravel, as well as Glacial erratics were created by the 6th century CE at the latest in order to traverse the Recknitz Valley. A total of five paths were discovered in 2015, the younger ones being dated between 719 and 830, and the youngest being dated to Old Slavic times.

At the end of the 12the century, a German settlement took place, and Laage became a German castle at the crossing of the Recknitz. In 1216, Laage was first mentioned as a village. The town belonged to the Werle Fiefdom Fiefdom. In 1270, Laage was mentioned in a deed of donation by Prince Nicholas II of Werle. Laage was the seat of the de:Landvogt until around the 15th century. In the middle of the 13th century the construction of an early Gothic village church was started, the tower being completed in the 15th century. In 1309 (according to other sources 1271) Laage was named an Oppidum, thus having town privileges. The city developed through the important east-west connection of the via regia – the royal road from Wismar to Demmin – and a country road to Rostock. In the 14th century, Laage received a rampart with moat to protect it from robber knights. With the death of Prince Wilhelm the Wendish the principality of Werle died out, and the Dukes of Mecklenburg therefore inherited Laage. The town became a town in Mecklenburg and as such was one of the towns in the Wendische Kreis, which until 1918 were represented at the Mecklenburg Legislature, united in 1523.

=== 16th to 19th centuries ===
In 1569, a fire broke out in the town. Parts of the city, church, and town hall were subject to damage. In 1638, during the Thirty Years' War, imperial troops attacked Laage. This was followed by The Black Death, from which only five residents survived. Hardly recovered, the Great Northern War and the Seven Years' War followed, with many casualties requiring the quartering of soldiers. In 1712, Czar Peter the Great had his quarters in Laage. In 1759, another town fire ensued, in which 63 houses and 24 barns burned down.

The city recovered from the wars. In 1768 it received a new city constitution, which was in force until 1918. Since then, there has been one mayor and two senators. The local governance consisted of a spokesperson, three viertelmann (a combination of mayor and policeman) and three deputies.

In 1692, a paper mill was built and in 1748 the Bockwindmill was built on the Bullenberg. In 1786, the first pharmacy was established by Chirurgus Hektor. Field Marshal Gebhard Leberecht von Blücher visited the city in 1814.

In 1829, Laage was better connected to the transport network with the construction of the Chaussee Rostock-Neubrandenburg. After the Gründerzeit, the village had a population of 2,345. The Amtsgericht and a paper mill were set up. It was followed in 1886 by a railway connection with Laage station west of the city center. In 1891, a voluntary fire brigade was founded. A dairy, the gas plant (1905), the waterworks and the water tower (1926) were built, and in 1915 the village received electric light.

=== Recent history ===
In the 1920s, new residential buildings were built, among others in the Paul-Lüth-Straße, the St. -Jürgen-Straße, Goethestraße and Breesener Straße. The sewerage system was also further expanded.

On May 1, 1945, the Red Army invaded Laage. The day before, local Social Democrats had dismantled the tank barriers erected for the defense. The acting mayor, Otto Thode, met the Soviet troops and prevented destruction in Laage.

Shortly after the invasion of the Red Army, on 2 May 1945, the well-known architect Paul Korff took his own life together with his wife. Otto Thode also chose suicide with his wife and daughter on that day. They were buried in communal graves at the Laager Cemetery.

After the Second World War, the number of inhabitants doubled due to the influx of refugees.

At the end of 1945 and the beginning of 1946, ten young people (aged 16 and over) were arrested by the Soviet secret service NKVD and sentenced by a military tribunal to heavy prison terms for “hostile attitudes towards Communism and the Red Army”. Seven of them died in the Soviet special camp Sachsenhausen. The group was rehabilitated in 1993 by the Prosecutor General's Office of the Russian Federation.

The milk sugar factory resumed production in 1946. Agricultural production cooperatives were established around 1950, and the Volkseigenes Gut was important. An outdoor swimming pool was built and in 1967 a second school was built on the new sports ground. The Breesener Straße Hospital became a rural ambulatory.

Around 1980, the military airfield was built. The Fighter Bomber Squadron 77 and the Marine Squadron 28 of the National People's Army (NVA) had been stationed at this military airfield since 1984 with Sukhoi Su-22 aircraft until the dissolution of the NVA. From 1979 to 1988, the Kronskamp residential area was built with 850 apartments in Large panel system-building, among other things for the soldiers stationed in Laage. A third school also had to be built.

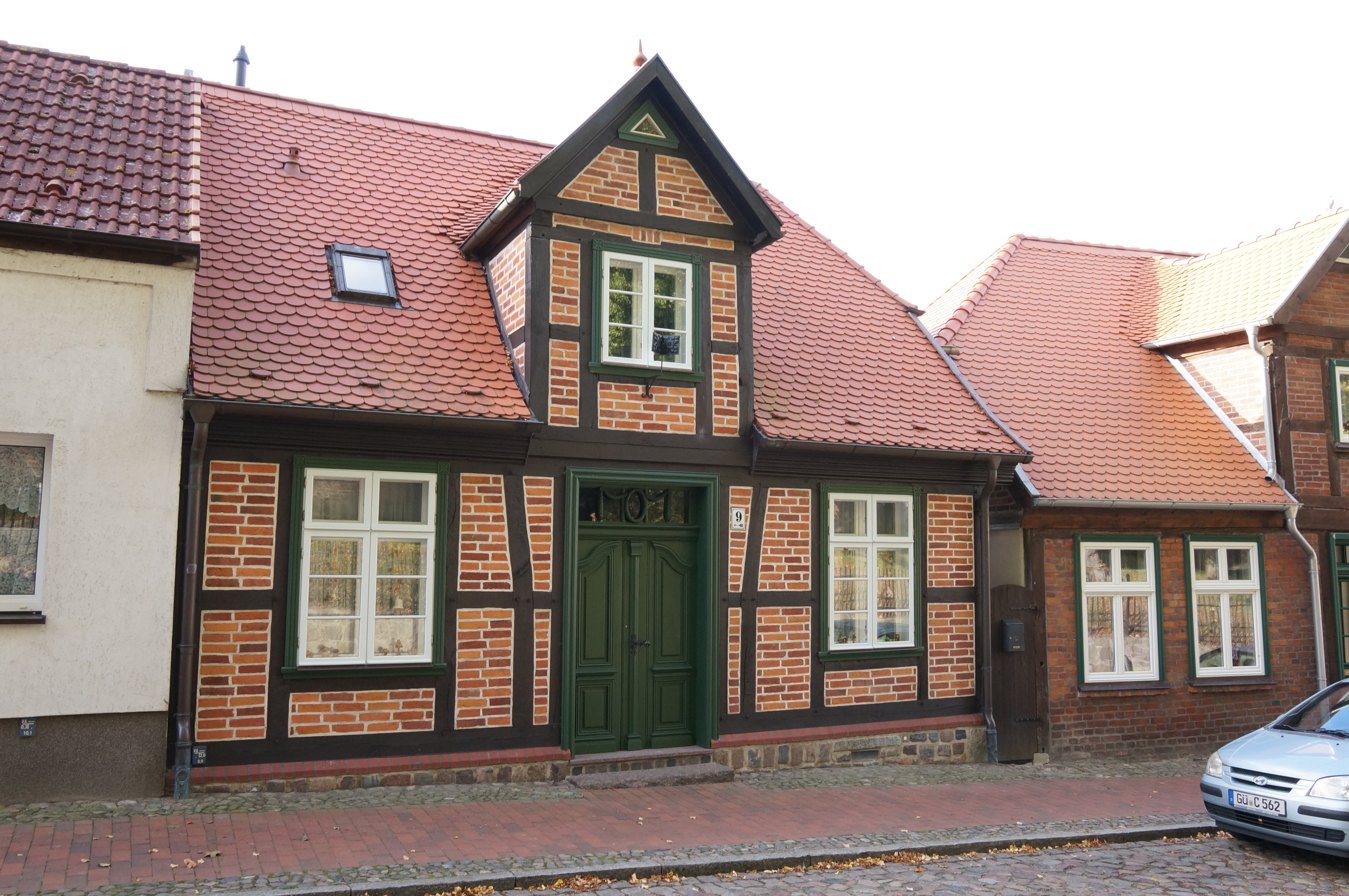
Saniertes Fachwerkhaus

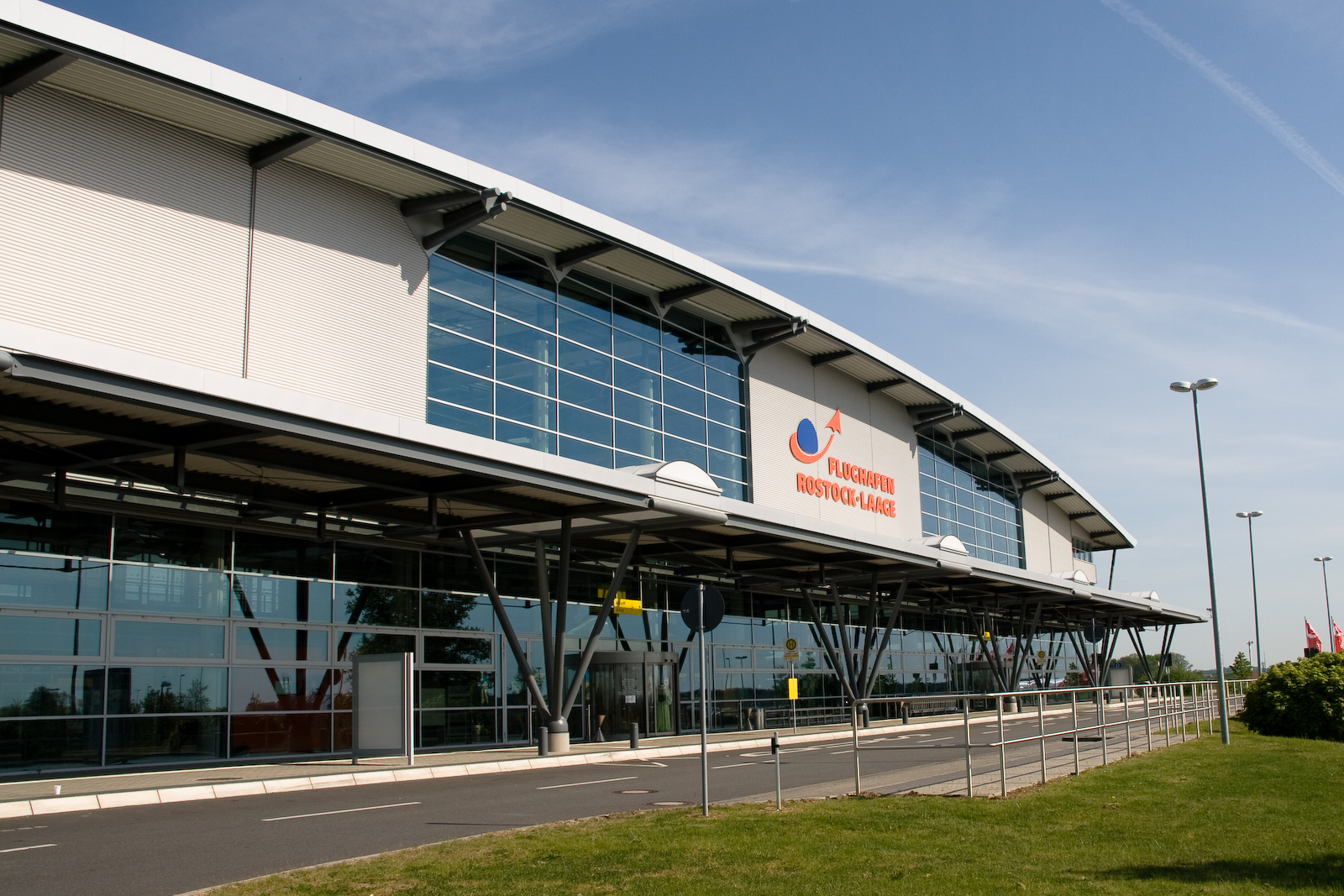
Flughafen Rostock-Laage

Since 1991, the historical town centre with its town hall and a little later the only remaining de:Scheunenviertel in Mecklenburg were fundamentally renovated as part of the urban development funding. The slab construction area has also been significantly improved since 1998 by demolition and upgrading measures.

The military airfield is operated by Jagdgeschwader 73 "Steinhoff" of the Bundeswehr and was expanded after 1994 in parallel to the civil airport Rostock-Laage. In 2018, around 290,000 passengers used the airport.

From 1952 to 2011 Laage belonged to the district of Güstrow (GDR-Bezirk Schwerin / State of Mecklenburg-Vorpommern) and since then is part of the district of Rostock.

=== History of municipal areas ===
Rossewitz: There was a castle here in the Middle Ages. Owner of the estates included the noble families Nortman (until 1450) and von Vieregg (until 1760), after which it was a ducal chamberlain. The early Baroque manor house Rossewitz was built on the foundations of the castle according to plans by Charles Philippe Dieussart between 1657 and 1680. It is considered to be the first Baroque building in Mecklenburg. Grand Duke Frederick Franz I lived in the castle several times. After 1945 it was a shelter for refugees. The roof collapsed in 1982, and an emergency roof was erected in 1986. Renovation work has taken place since 1993.

Schweez is a manor village and was owned by the families of Hahn (until 1771), Reichgrave von Wallmoden-Gimborn (until 1845), Count von Bassewitz (until 1913) and Count von Schlieffen.

Weitendorf: The church dates from the 13th century, the upper baroque tower from the 18th century, and the baroque park from 1763.

=== Incorporation ===
On 1 July 1950, the formerly independent communities of Breesen and Kronskamp were incorporated. Liessow was incorporated into the city of Laage on 13 June 2004, Weitendorf on 1 July 2006 and Diekhof on 26 May 2019.

== Population ==
Year	Residents
1637	5
1706	66
1756	513
1813	925
1850	1828
1885	2345
1900	2548
1939	2924
1984	3884

Year	Residents
1990	6295
1995	6042
2000	5223
2005	5119
2010	5591
2015	5403

Year	Residents
2020	6477
2021	6450
2022	6549

From 1990 onwards, 31 December of each year

The stark increase in the population in 2019 is due to the incorporation of Diekhof.

== Politics ==
=== Municipal elections ===
Following the municipal elections on 26 May 2019, the municipal council of Laage is composed of the mayor and 19 city representatives:

Party / List	CDU	Laage Electorate	Die Linke	FDP	Diekhof Electorate	SPD	Total
Seats	7	3	3	2	2	2	19
Share of the vote	35,7 %	16,4 %	14,4 %	12,6 %	11,1 %	9,8 %	100%

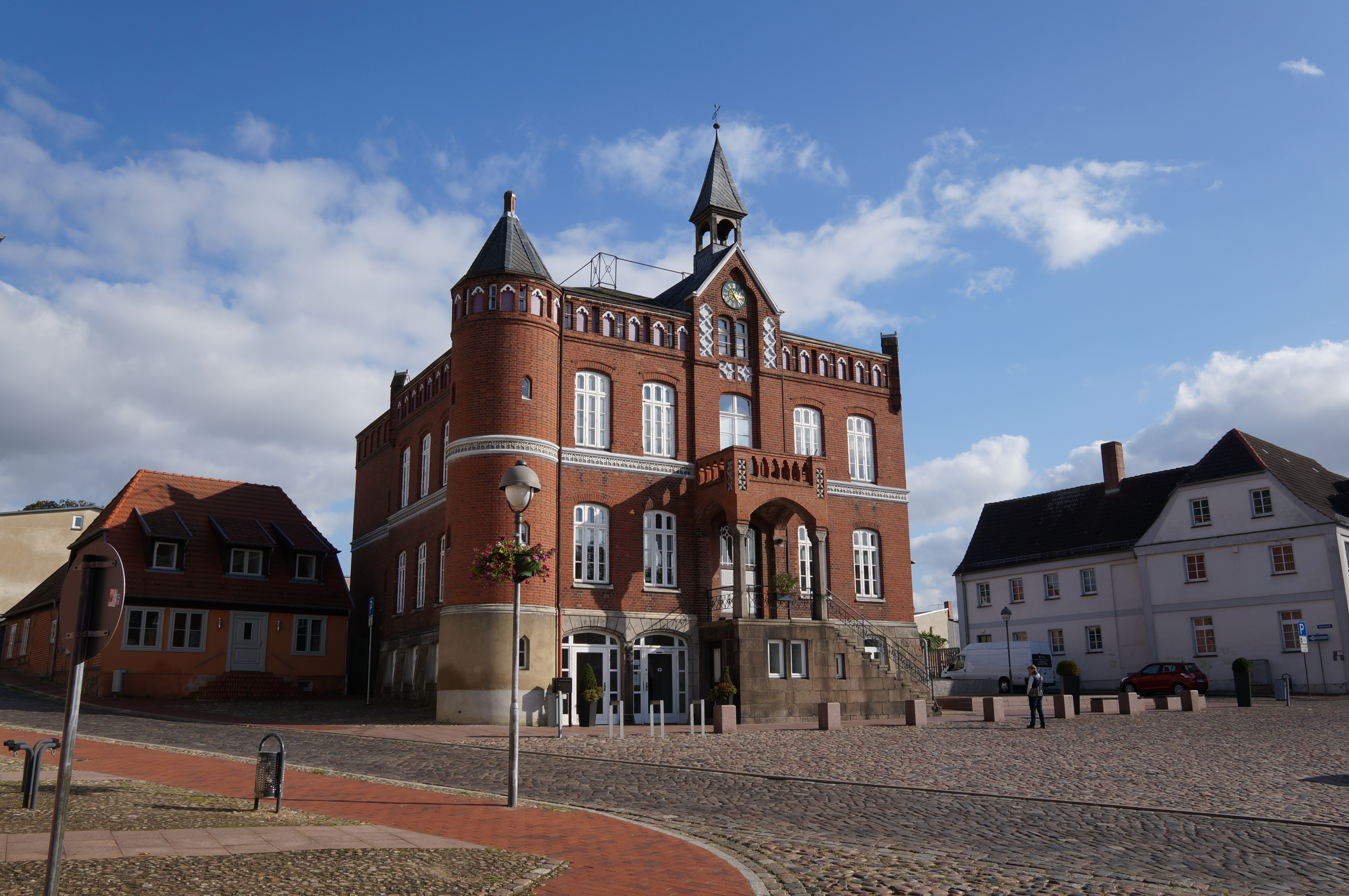
Town Hall

=== Mayor ===
- 1900–1936: Fritz Kähler
- 1936–1942: Paul Koop (NSDAP)
- 1943–1945: Otto Thode (NSDAP)
- 1945–1946: August Hanitz (KPD)
- 1946–1947: Richard Hübner (SED)
- 1947–1950: Heinrich Schlaack (SED)
- 1951–1954: Helmuth Lendner (SED)
- 1954–1955: Robert Bendlin (SED)
- 1955–1960: Fritz Gelhaar (SED)
- 1960–1975: Willi Serve (SED)
- 1975–1979: Annelore Bull (SED)
- 1979–1990: Eckhart Bomke (SED)
- 1990–1994: Wolfram Steinke (CDU)
- 1994–2010: Uwe Heinze (SPD)
- 2010–2017: Ilka Lochner (CDU)
- 2017–2023: Holger Anders (FDP)

Anders was elected in the mayoral run-off election on 8 October 2017 with 50.9% of the valid votes. He remained in office until his death in September 2023.

=== Coat of arms ===
Coat of arms of Laage
Notes Coat of Arms of the City of Laage. In gold a visionary black bull's head with a closed mouth, a beaten red tongue, between whose silver horns a red lily grows. Adopted The coat of arms was established on 10 April 1858 by Grand Duke Friedrich Franz II of Mecklenburg-Schwerin, redrawn in 1998 and registered under No. 5 of the coat of arms of the state of Mecklenburg-Western Pomerania. Symbolism The coat of arms, designed after the seal image of the SIGILLVM CIVITATIS LAWE – first handed down as a print in 1353, and laid down in its current form in April 1858, points with the bull head typical of the Werl line of the Mecklenburg princely house to Herr zu Werle as the city's founder and lord. As the meaning of the lily is largely unclear, over time it disappeared from the city's seal paintings.

=== Flag ===
The flag was approved by the Ministry of Interior on 4 April 2016.

The flag consists of a yellow cloth and is covered in the centre with the figure of the city's coat of arms, which occupies two thirds of the height of the flag cloth: a visionary black bull's head with a closed mouth and a knocked out red tongue, between whose silver horns a red lily grows. The height of the flag cloth is related to the length as 3:5.

=== Seal of office ===
The official seal shows the city coat of arms with the inscription • STADT LAAGE •.

== Places of interest ==
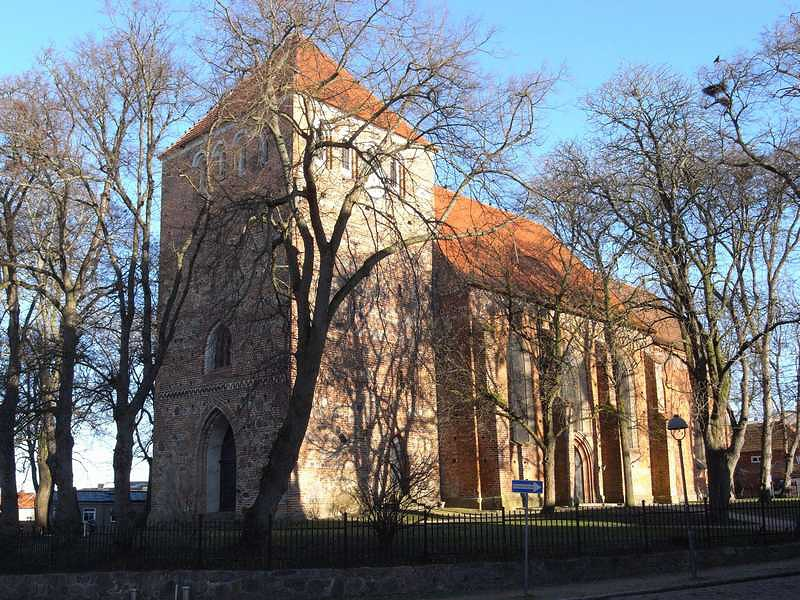
Stadtkirche

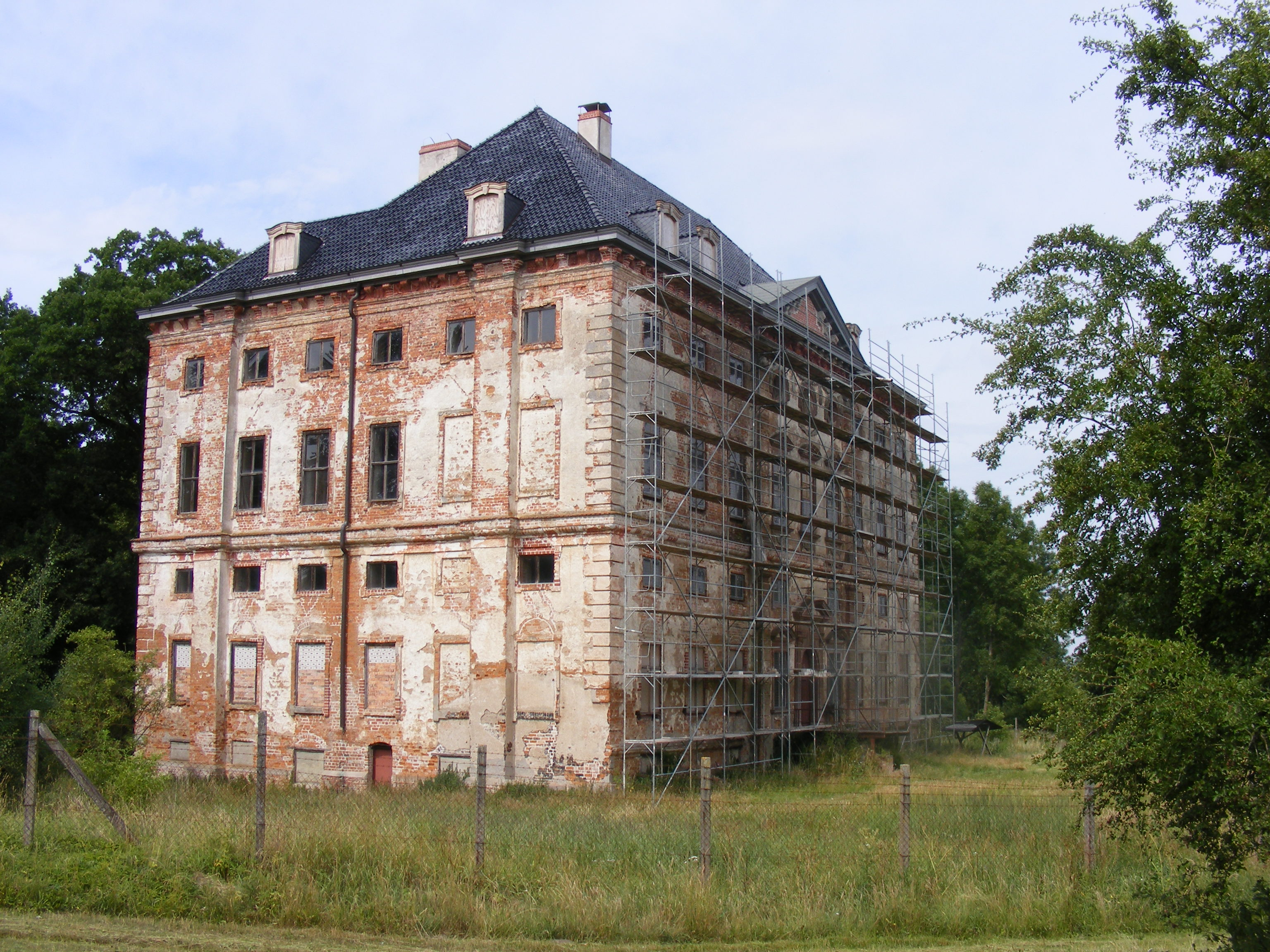
Herrenhaus Rossewitz

- Town Church; a romanesque/gothic three-bay Hall church made from brick and stone. Start of construction in the middle of the 13th century, massive west tower from the 14. or 15th century. Interior: wooden ceilings of the vaults in the first two naves, glass windows with motifs of biblical history, chalice from 1603. The houses around the church square are among the oldest in the city. The rectory dates back to the late 18th century.
- Neogothic Town Hall located on the market square since 1876; repaired from 1996-2000
- Ruin of the Dutch windmill from 1792 on the Mühlenberg
- de:Scheunenviertel from 1875, shows Laage's development as a farming town
- Apothecary from 1786 and other timber framed houses on the market square
- Fachwerkhaus Breesener Straße 21 from the early 19th century, birthplace of Otto Intze
- Stadtscheune, from around 1860/1880 on Pfendkammerweg; today meeting place and local museum
- Villa Korff, from 1912, Architect: Paul Korff
- Water Tower on Pfendkammerweg, used until the 1980s and used today as an observation tower along the Recknitztal
- Memorial for the fallen from the Franco-Prussian War and World War I and the victims of the Second World War
- Weitendorf Municipal Area: Town church, classical funeral chapels from 1816 to 1845
- Kritzkow Municipal Area: Town church, a middle-aged gothic brick building, almost completely renovated in 1900, a half-timbered rectory from the 19th century
- Liessow Municipal Area: Herrenhaus Rossewitz from 1657 to 1680, first owner General Major Heinrich von Vieregge, first renovation efforts 1993

== Transportation ==
Laage is located along the Bundesstraßen B 103 to Güstrow and B 108 to Teterow along with the Landesstraßen L 18 to Tessin and the L 39 to Rostock.

The Laage (Meckl) station sits on the Neustrelitz–Warnemünde railway. The Rostock S-Bahn S3 line runs through here from Rostock–Güstrow.

West of the city is the Rostock–Laage Airport.

== Notable people ==
=== Söhne und Töchter of the city ===
- Franz Susemihl (1826–1901), Classics#Philology
- Otto Intze (1843–1904), Hydraulic engineer and university lecturer
- Bernhard Riedel (1846–1916), Surgeon
- Paul Korff (1875–1945), Architect
- Bernhard Beyer (1879–1966), Freemason
- Rolf H. Dittmeyer (1921–2009), Entrepreneur
- Karlheinz Gieseler (1925–2010), Sports official, born in Schweez
- Axel Kaspar (* 1939), Documentary filmmaker
- Frauke Weiß (* 1946), Politician (CDU)

=== With a personal connection to Laage ===
- Carl Beyer (1847–1923), 1875–1900 Pastor in Laage, Heimat Author
- Rudolf Sieger (1867–1925), painter, lived in Laage
- Friedrich Kähler (1873–1942), 1900–1936 mayor in Laage, Heimat Author
- Peter Kauffold (1937–2014), 1998–2002 Minister of Education for Mecklenburg-Vorpommern, lived in Laage
- Joachim Gauck (* 1940), former President of Germany, Vicar in Laage
- Karin Schmidt (* 1955), Politician (Die Linke), Teacher in Laage
- Ilka Lochner (* 1970), Politician (CDU), 2010–2017 Mayor of Laage

== Bibliography ==
- Martin Zeiller: Lage. In: Matthäus Merian (Hrsg.): Topographia Saxoniae Inferioris (= Topographia Germaniae. Band 14). 1. Auflage. Matthaeus Merians Erben, Frankfurt am Main 1653, S. 151 (Volltext [Wikisource]).
- Carl Beyer: Geschichte der Stadt Lage. In: Jahrbücher des Vereins für mecklenburgische Geschichte und Altertumskunde. Teil I, Band 52, 1887, S. 209–293; Teil II, Band 53, 1888, S. 1–130.
- Fritz Kähler: Wahrheit und Dichtung über Laage. Paul Holm, Laage 1937.
- Stadtverwaltung Laage (Hrsg.): 775 Jahre Laage/Mecklenburg. Chronik. Lage/Lippe 1991.
- Monika Riek: Laage und Umgebung. Edition Temmen, Rostock 1998, ISBN 3-86108-433-3.
- Stadt Laage (Hrsg.): Laager Almanach 2004. Druckerei AC. Froh, Plau am See 2004.
- Verein der Natur- und Heimatfreunde Laage und Umgebung e. V.: Laager Geschichten I. Beiträge zur Geschichte anlässlich des 800. Jahrestages der Stadt Laage. Laage 2016.
- Verein der Natur- und Heimatfreunde Laage und Umgebung e.V.: Laager Geschichten II. Beiträge zur Geschichte der Stadt Laage. Laage 2016.
