= Güstrow station =

Railway station in Mecklenburg-Vorpommern, Germany

Güstrow
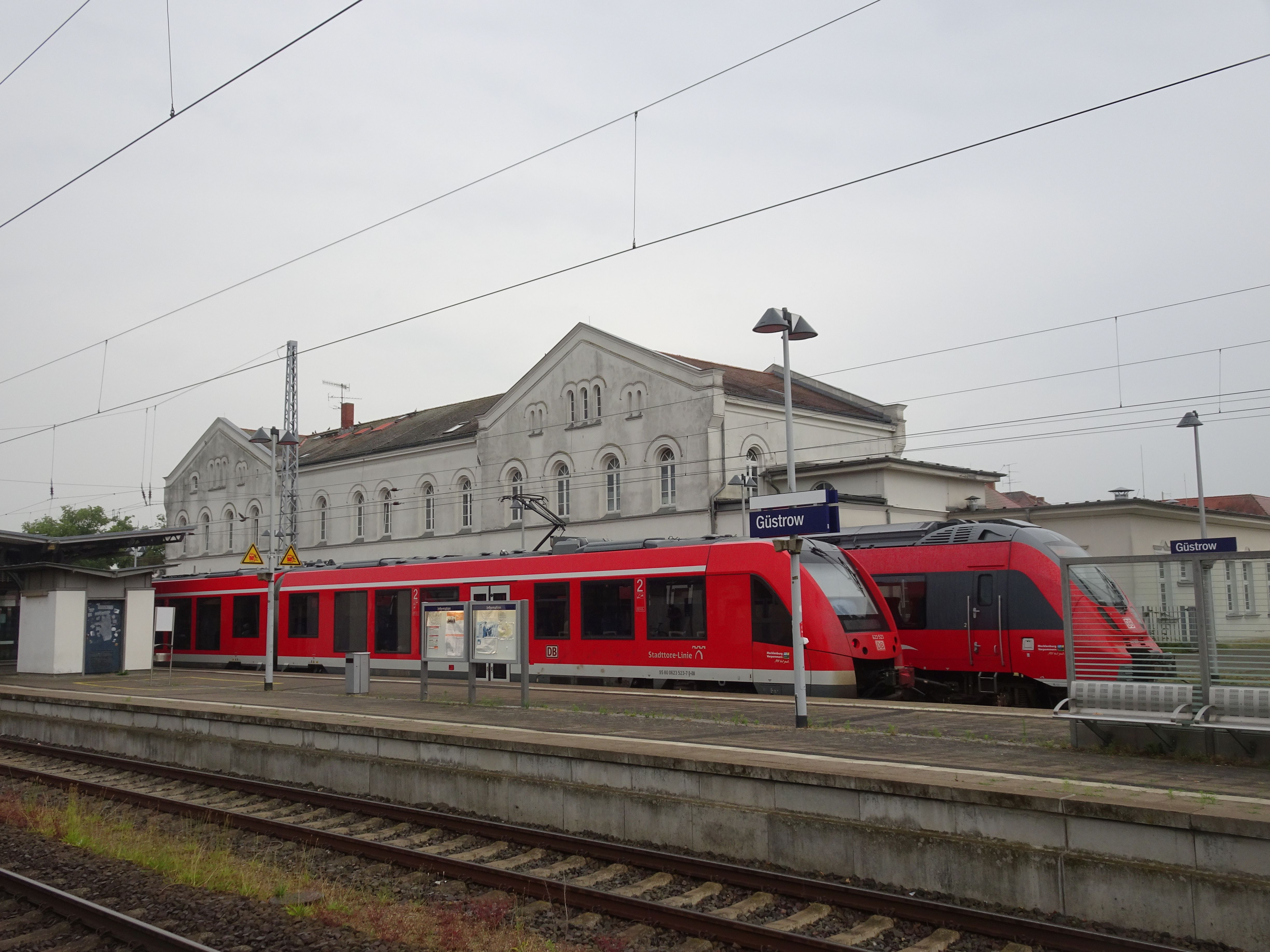
- 2021

General information
- Location: Bahnhofsplatz 3; 18273 Güstrow; Mecklenburg-Vorpommern; Germany
- Coordinates: 53°48′03″N 12°10′21″E
- Owner: Deutsche Bahn
- Operator: DB Station&Service
- Lines: Bützow–Szczecin railway (KBS 175); Güstrow–Schwaan railway (KBS 182); Güstrow–Meyenburg railway
- Platforms: 2 island platforms 1 side platform
- Tracks: 5
- Train operators: DB Regio Nordost
- Connections: RE 4RE 5; S2S2XS3

Other information
- Station code: 2432
- DS100 code: WG
- IBNR: 8010153
- Category: 3
- Fare zone: VVW
- Website: www.bahnhof.de

History
- Opened: 13 May 1850; 176 years ago
- Electrified: 18 May 1985; 41 years ago

Services
Preceding station	DB Regio Nordost	Following station
Bützow Terminus	RE 4	Priemerburg towards Szczecin Główny or Ueckermünde Stadthafen
Bützow Terminus	RE 4	Priemerburg towards Ueckermünde Stadthafen
Rostock Hbf Terminus	RE 5	Langhagen towards Berlin Südkreuz
Rostock Hbf Terminus	RE 50	Langhagen towards Neustrelitz Hbf
Preceding station	Rostock S-Bahn	Following station
Lüssow (Meckl) towards Warnemünde	S2	Terminus
Rostock Hbf Terminus	S2X	Terminus
Priemerburg towards Warnemünde	S3	Terminus
Location
- Location within Mecklenburg-Vorpommern Location within Germany Location within Europe

Güstrow station is a railway station in the municipality of Güstrow, located in the Rostock district in Mecklenburg-Vorpommern, Germany.
