= Warnemünde station =

Railway station in Mecklenburg-Vorpommern, Germany

Warnemünde
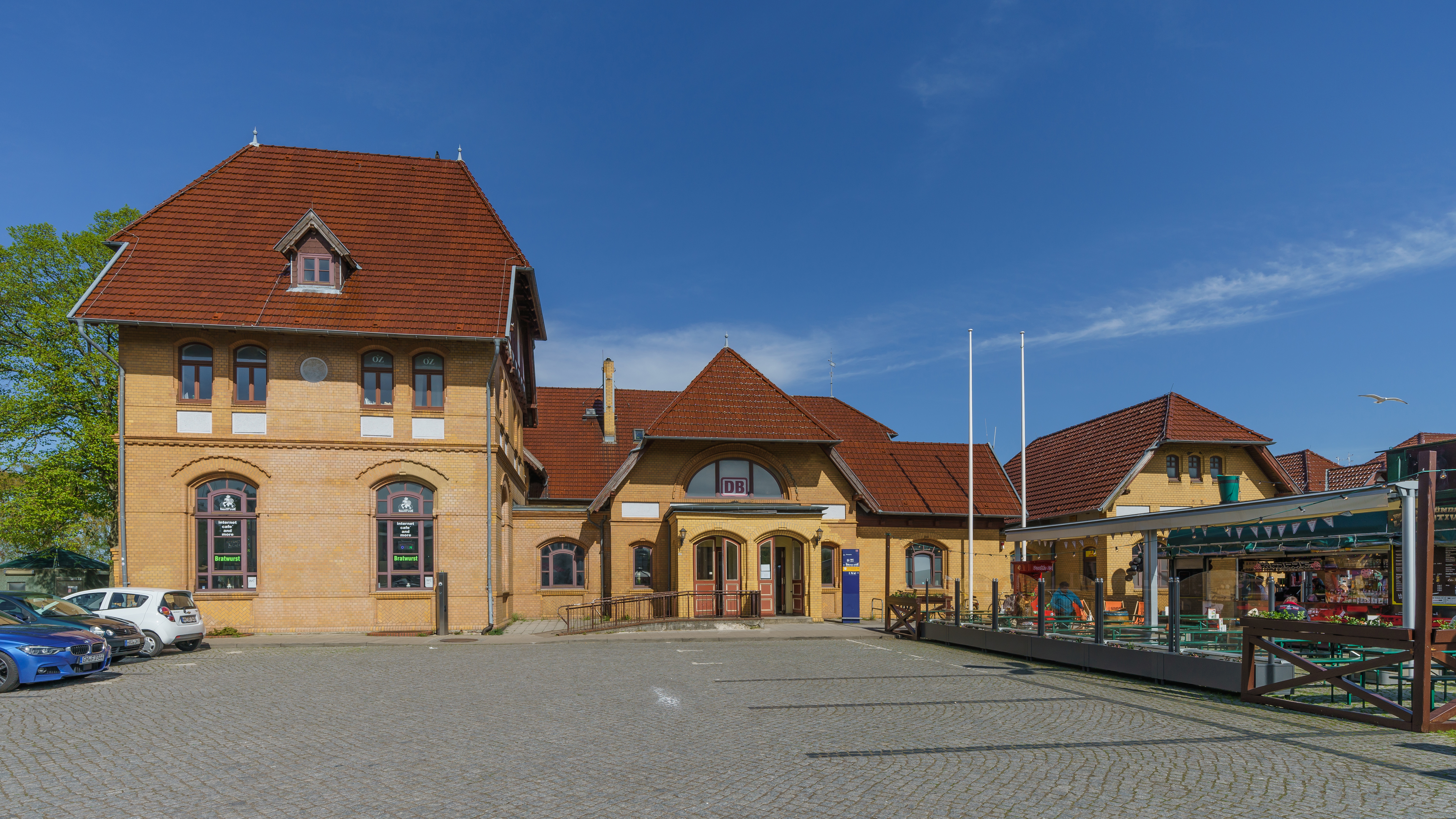
- Warnemünde railway station

General information
- Location: Am Bahnhof 5, Warnemünde, MV; Germany
- Coordinates: 54°10′38″N 12°05′27″E
- Owner: Deutsche Bahn
- Operator: DB Netz; DB Station&Service
- Line: Neustrelitz–Warnemünde railway
- Platforms: 5

Construction
- Accessible: Yes

Other information
- Station code: 6545
- DS100 code: WWM
- IBNR: 8013263
- Category: 3
- Website: www.bahnhof.de

History
- Opened: 30 September 1903; 123 years ago
- Electrified: 14 December 1985; 40 years ago

Services
| Preceding station | DB Fernverkehr | Following station |
|---|---|---|
| Terminus | IC 57 | Rostock Hbf towards Leipzig Hbf |
| Preceding station | Rostock S-Bahn | Following station |
| Terminus | S1 | Warnemünde Werft towards Rostock Hbf |
| Terminus | S2 | Warnemünde Werft towards Güstrow |
| Terminus | S3 | Warnemünde Werft towards Güstrow |
Location

Warnemünde station is located in the seaside resort of Warnemünde, a district of the Hanseatic city of Rostock in the German state of Mecklenburg-Vorpommern. The station opened on 30 September 1903 and is located on the Neustrelitz–Warnemünde railway. It is the terminus of all three Rostock S-Bahn lines. In addition, some long-distance trains serve the station. Until 1995, it was the starting point of ferries to Gedser in Denmark. The station building and some other facilities of the station have heritage protection.

== Infrastructure ==
The station is located on an island between two arms of the estuary of the Warnow, the old and the new channel, a few metres away from the Baltic Sea. A swing bridge connects it to the west to the centre of Warnemünde. To the east of the station on the new channel is the Warnemünde Cruise Terminal, which is the location of berths for cruise ships as well as the departure point of the ferry crossing the Warnow to Hohe Düne.

The station consists of a terminal platform for tracks 1 and 2, a broad central platform with track 3, which also terminates, and track 4, which formerly served traffic continuing north to the ferry wharf. This is followed by track 5 and a side platform serving track 6. There were formerly some sidings east of platform 6. Tracks 1 to 4 are reached directly from the station forecourt, while a pedestrian tunnel leads to platform 6 and the berthings. There were some sidings southeast of platform 6 in an area that is now used for paid parking.

The station building is located north of the platforms on the station forecourt (Bahnhofsvorplatz). On the middle platform there is a building that was formerly used as the waiting room for the grand duke.

=== Old railway station, freight yard and Warnemünde Werft station ===
Until 1903 the track ended about one kilometre south of the present passenger station at a terminal station. The site of the old station was then used as a freight yard. Parts of the system of tracks exist until 2014, but like the rest of the site, it was no longer used. Warnemünde Werft (shipyard) station is now in the area of the former freight yard. It consists of two outside platforms. Both platforms are connected to each other and with the suburb by a subway. The freight yard and Werft station are administered as part of Warnemünde station. The station building of the old station remained largely intact during the renovation in 1903 with the tracks to the new station running through it. The building was largely demolished during the electrification of the line in the early 1980s, with only the western part of the station house having been preserved. The remains were destroyed in 2014 when part of the area was used for new resident buildings.

=== Ferry terminal ===
To the north of the passenger station there was the ferry terminal, which was the former departure point for ferries to Gedser. Two ferry berths were available for the ferry.

== History ==
The Deutsch-Nordische-Lloyd (German-Nordic-Lloyd) Railway Company opened the line to Warnemünde in 1886. Its main purpose was to connect Berlin with Denmark. The railway was opened on 26 June 1886 along with the two ports of Warnemünde and Gedser, replacing the mail steamer connection between Rostock and Nykøbing Falster. The travel time from Berlin to Copenhagen was reduced to 12 hours as a result. Warnemünde station was a railway terminus at the end of the track with an entrance building. Immediately adjacent to it and connected by a covered walkway was the departure point for the steamer to Gedser, which was a 450-metre-long pool.

The waterways in Warnemünde were rebuilt at the beginning of the 20th century. The new channel was built as a connection to Rostock for wider vessels and the old channel lost its importance for access to Rostock. The Grand Duchy of Mecklenburg Friedrich-Franz Railway (Großherzoglich Mecklenburgische Friedrich-Franz-Eisenbahn), which had acquired the railway in 1894, the Postdampferlinie (mail steamer line) and the Danish State Railway planned to convert the link into a steam-powered train ferry. To allow a train ferry to carry railway cars directly to Denmark, a new railway station and a ferry port were built across the old channel, enabling the direct loading of trains.

Construction began in 1900. The city of Rostock took responsibility for constructing the earthworks for the new railway station premises, the reconstruction of the piers, the construction of the new 1.1 kilometre-long sea channel and the construction of a bridge across the old channel to connect with the station.

The station building of the old railway station was in the way of the extension of the line. That is why the tracks were built directly through the central part of the entrance building, creating a kind of tunnel.

=== Further development ===
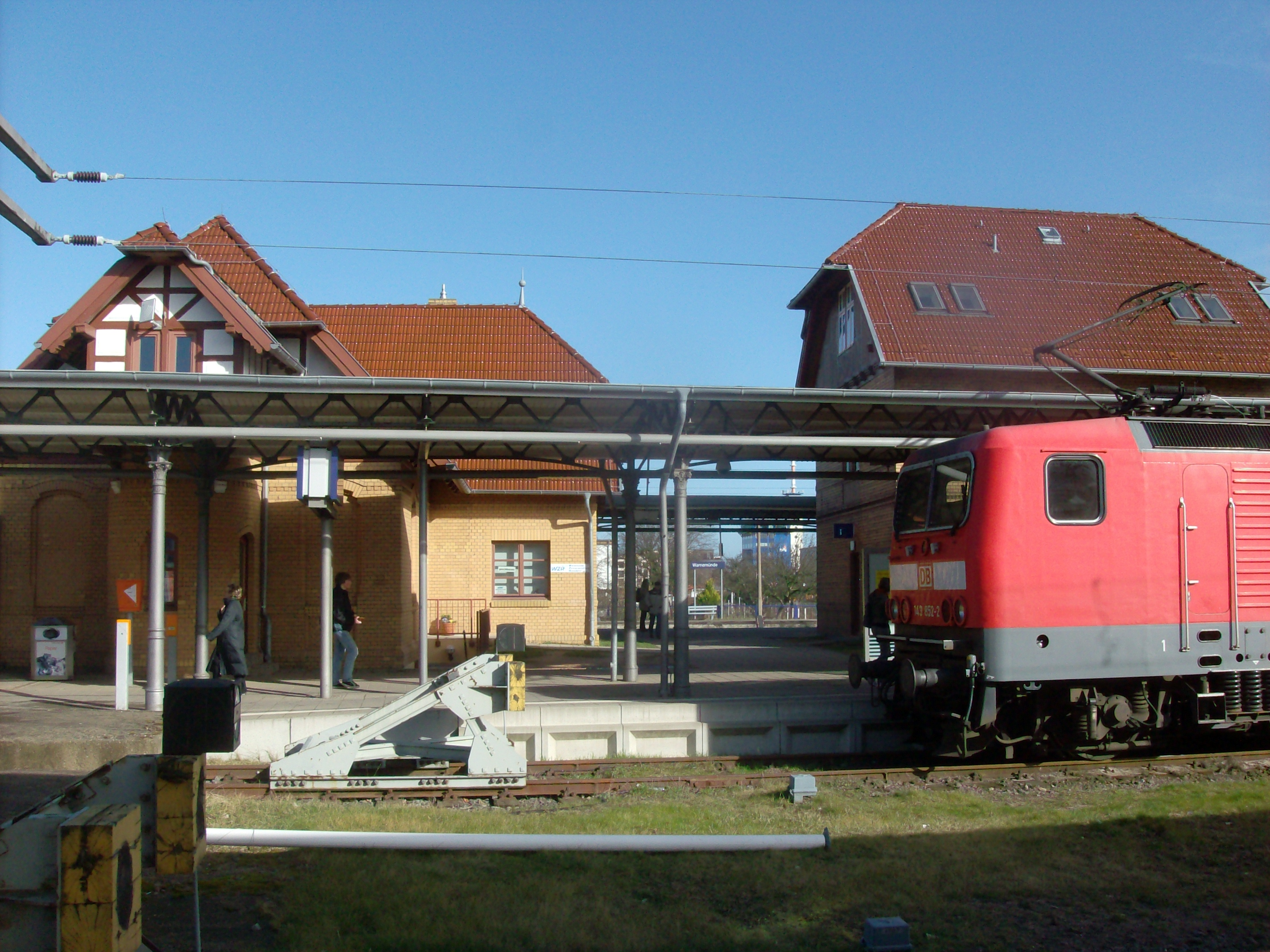
Platform with grand duke's waiting room (March 2008)

The work was completed on 30 September 1903 and the new station went into operation. The tracks of the old railway station have since served as a freight yard. In 1935/36, the outside platform 6 was built on the side to add new capacity at the station.

In 1911, the track to Rostock was doubled, but the second track was ripped up after 1945 to provide reparations to the Soviet Union. The ferry, which irrespective of political difficulties, had continued even in times of war, was closed on 1 May 1945 and was restored mainly at the instigation of the Danish on 10 May 1947. The ferry infrastructure had survived the war without major damage.

After the Second World War, the Warnow shipyard was built. Warnow Werft station was built next to it on the site of the freight yard for the transport of workers in 1949. It was served only at peak-hours until 1959, but since then it has been used for normal traffic.

The ferry berths were rebuilt in 1962. The international traffic to Denmark in the decades from the early 1960s to the late 1980s consisted of two pairs of direct trains, the Neptun, which ran during the daytime, and the Ostsee-Express, which ran during the night. In addition, an express train connected with the afternoon ferry to and from Gedser with Berlin.

The connection to Rostock was converted into an S-Bahn in 1974. After double track had been restored on the section from Rostock Hauptbahnhof to Bramow, the line was fully redoubled. Between Marienehe and Warnemünde Werft, the line was at the same time moved further west to be closer to residential areas. An additional island platform was installed at Warnemünde Werft station, requiring one of the tracks in the freight yard to be dismantled. The line from Rostock to Warnemunde was electrified in 1985. The "tunnel" through the old Warnemünde Werft station building obstructed the electrification, requiring part of the building to be demolished. Only the western part of the building remained and served as a residence.

In 1988, a new signal box of GSIII SP68 design was put in operation at the station; it controls traffic to Bramow and replaced three old mechanical signal boxes.

After the political change in the GDR (Die Wende), there was a boom in international travel. A third train service to Denmark was established. However, it turned out that the connection from the ferry terminal to the road network was unsuitable for the increased traffic. Car ferries from the port of Rostock took over the bulk of the traffic. On 23 September 1995, the ferry service from Warnemünde to Denmark was closed thus ending passenger services on this route and the rail connections to the ferry port have been unused since then. Several attempts to restart them have been unsuccessful. In 2014/2015 the berths were rebuilt.

In 1992, the passenger station was redeveloped with its historic buildings. Platform 1/2 received a continuous canopy in 1999.

== Station operations ==
The station is the terminus of the S-Bahn service from Rostock every quarter of an hour (every 7.5 minutes during the peak hour). In addition, it is served by an Intercity-Express to Munich via Berlin running six times a week. In summer, an Intercity service runs to Magdeburg, Halle and Leipzig. A direct tourist train linking Berlin and Warnemünde runs all year round on weekends. The trains mostly use just platforms 1–4. The outer platform 6 has been used since the early 2000s mostly for special trains to cruise ships and at the nightly shutdown of S-Bahn services.

A direct connection between city buses does not exist. A ferry runs from the southeast of the station across the river Warnow to Hohe Dune.

The pedestrian tunnel from the ferry, the cruise terminal and platform 6 is planned to be demolished in the future as part of the reconstruction of the station. Tracks 4–6, which lead to the now disused ferry terminal and are crossed by the tunnel, will perhaps be shortened so that a cross platform may be built to connect the ends of the platforms. Three platform tracks for the S-Bahn and another two platforms for other trains and cruise trains remain in operation. It is estimated that the reconstruction costs will amount to €6.5 million. The site of the former terminals would be available for the urban development, but now partly belongs to Scandlines. A car park has been established on the remaining part.

In the freight yard, the disused railway siding to the shipyard was put back into operation at the end of 2007. The area around the former freight yard and at the station Warnemünde Werft was rebuilt. The pedestrian bridge was replaced by a tunnel for pedestrians and cyclists. South of the station a road bridge has been built that is used by traffic running to the cruise terminal and the Warnemünde – Hohe Düne ferry. The level crossing between the passenger station and the freight yard was closed after the completion of the bridge. On the site of the disused freight yard apartments are to be built.

Several parts of the station have heritage protection. These include the entrance building, the grand waiting room on the central platform 3/4, the platform itself with its canopy on cast-iron columns, the former post office building and the old signal box on the eastern side of the station. The swing bridge over the old channel that connects the station and central Warnemünde is also a listed building.

=== Rail services ===
In the 2026 timetable, the following services stop at the station:

| Line | Route | Frequency (min) | Operator |
|---|---|---|---|
| IC 57 | Leipzig – Halle – Magdeburg – Stendal – Wittenberge – Ludwigslust – Schwerin – Rostock – Warnemünde | 1 train pair | DB Fernverkehr |
| S1 | Warnemünde – Rostock-Lütten Klein – Rostock Hbf | 15; 7.5 in the peak together with S2 and S3 | DB Regio Nordost |
| S2 | Warnemünde – Rostock-Lütten Klein – Rostock Hbf – Schwaan – Güstrow | 60; 120 on the weekend | DB Regio Nordost |
| S3 | Warnemünde – Rostock-Lütten Klein – Rostock Hbf – Laage – Plaaz – Güstrow | 60; 120 on the weekend | DB Regio Nordost |

== See also ==
- Rail transport in Germany
- Railway stations in Germany
