= Berlin-Albrechtshof station =

Railway station in Spandau, Germany

Coordinates: 52°32′58″N 13°07′42″E

Albrechtshof
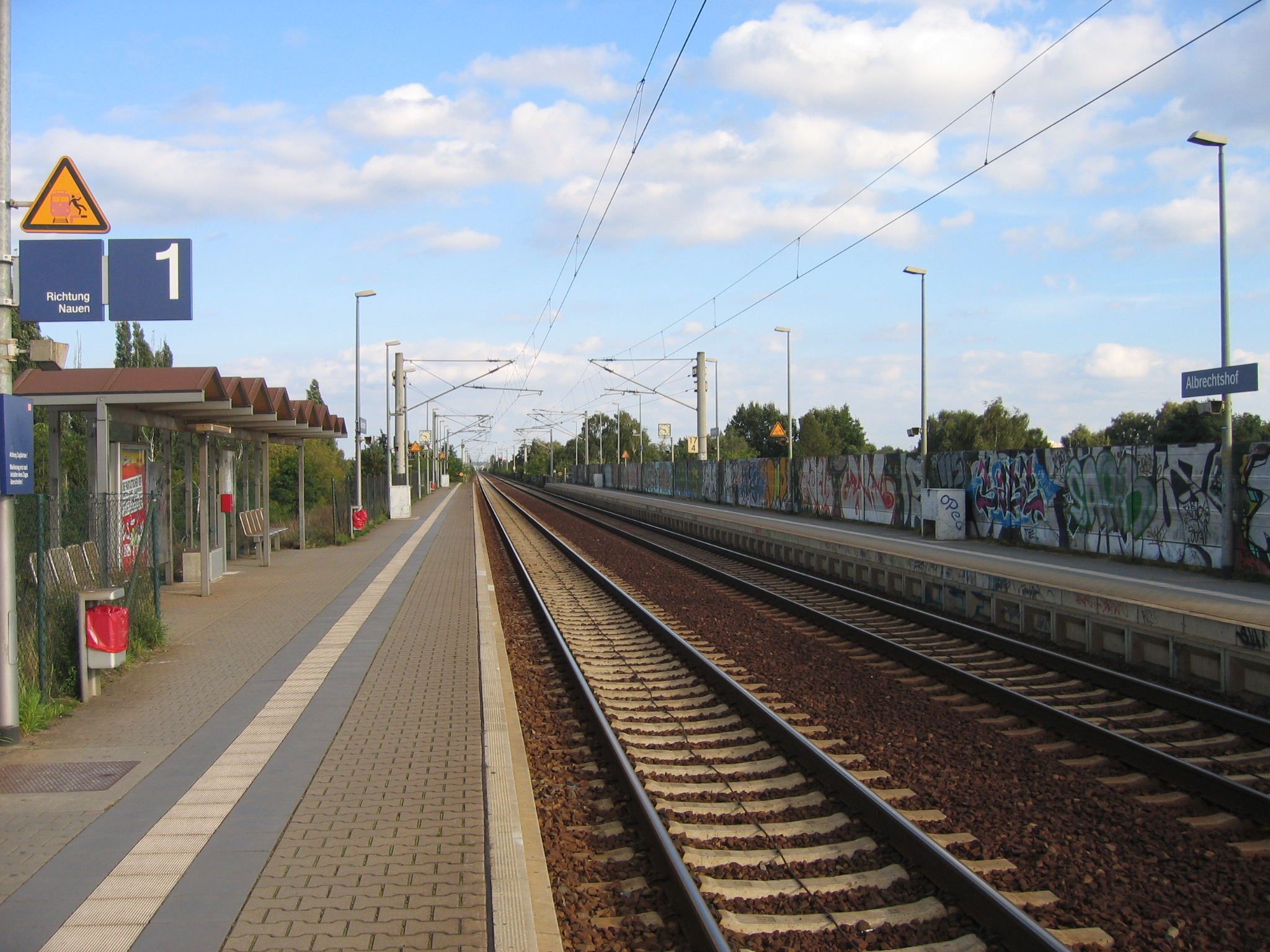
- 2007

General information
- Location: Seegefelder Weg 464; 13591 Berlin; Spandau; Germany
- Owner: DB Netz
- Operator: DB Station&Service
- Lines: Berlin–Hamburg Railway (KBS 209.10/209.14)
- Platforms: 2 side platforms
- Tracks: 2
- Train operators: DB Regio Nordost
- Connections: : 237

Other information
- Station code: 45
- DS100 code: BAS
- IBNR: 8080040
- Category: 5
- Fare zone: : Berlin B/5656
- Website: www.bahnhof.de

History
- Opened: 1 April 1943; 83 years ago
- Closed: 9 October 1961; 64 years ago
- Electrified: 14 August 1951; 75 years ago, 750 volts DC system (3rd rail) main line 28 September 1983; 42 years ago, 15 kV 16 2/3 Hz AC system (overhead)

Key dates
- 1945, 24 April - early August: operation interrupted
- 23 May 1993 - 28 May 1995: operation interrupted

Services
Preceding station	DB Regio Nordost	Following station
Seegefeld towards Nauen	RB 10	Berlin-Spandau towards Rangsdorf
Seegefeld towards Nauen	RB 14	Berlin-Spandau towards Berlin Ostbahnhof
Location

Berlin-Albrechtshof is a railway station located in Staaken, a locality in the Spandau district of Berlin. It is one of only two Deutsche Bahn stations in Berlin not served by the S-Bahn; Staaken station is the other.

== Overview ==
The station is situated on the Berlin–Hamburg railway, between the stations of Berlin Spandau and Seegefeld.

The station has two side platforms for passenger service, served by the local trains RB10 (in 2014: Berlin Hauptbahnhof - Jungfernheide - Nauen) and RB14 (Senftenberg-Nauen). The regional express trains do not call here.

On 5 December 1961, Albrechtshof station was the scene of the successful escape of a Reichsbahn steam-engine driver, who managed to overcome the barriers erected in August that year. As a consequence of the escape of 25 GDR citizens to West-Berlin, 20 metres of track were removed to prevent another breakthrough. The event was the basis for a 1963 film, The Breakthrough.

== Train services ==
The station is served by the following services:

- RB 10: Nauen – Berlin-Albrechtshof – Berlin – Berlin Südkreuz
- RB 14: Nauen – Berlin-Albrechtshof – Berlin – Berlin Südkreuz

== See also ==
- List of railway stations in the Berlin area
