= Seegefeld station =

Railway station in Germany

Seegefeld

General information
- Location: Seegefelder Straße 144; 14612 Falkensee; Brandenburg; Germany
- Coordinates: 52.5525°N 13.1169°E
- Owner: DB Netz
- Operator: DB Station&Service
- Lines: Berlin–Hamburg Railway (KBS 209.10/209.14)
- Platforms: 2 side platforms
- Tracks: 2
- Train operators: DB Regio Nordost

Other information
- Station code: 7743
- DS100 code: BSFD
- IBNR: 8081586
- Category: 5
- Fare zone: VBB: Berlin C/5451
- Website: www.bahnhof.de

History
- Opened: 1995; 31 years ago

Services
| Preceding station | DB Regio Nordost | Following station |
|---|---|---|
| Falkensee towards Nauen | RB 10 | Berlin-Albrechtshof towards Rangsdorf |
| Falkensee towards Nauen | RB 14 | Berlin-Albrechtshof towards Berlin Ostbahnhof |
Location
- Location within Brandenburg Location within Germany Location within Europe

Seegefeld station is a railway station in the Seegefeld district in the municipality of Falkensee, located in the Havelland district in Brandenburg, Germany.
