= Finkenkrug station =

Railway station in Germany

Finkenkrug
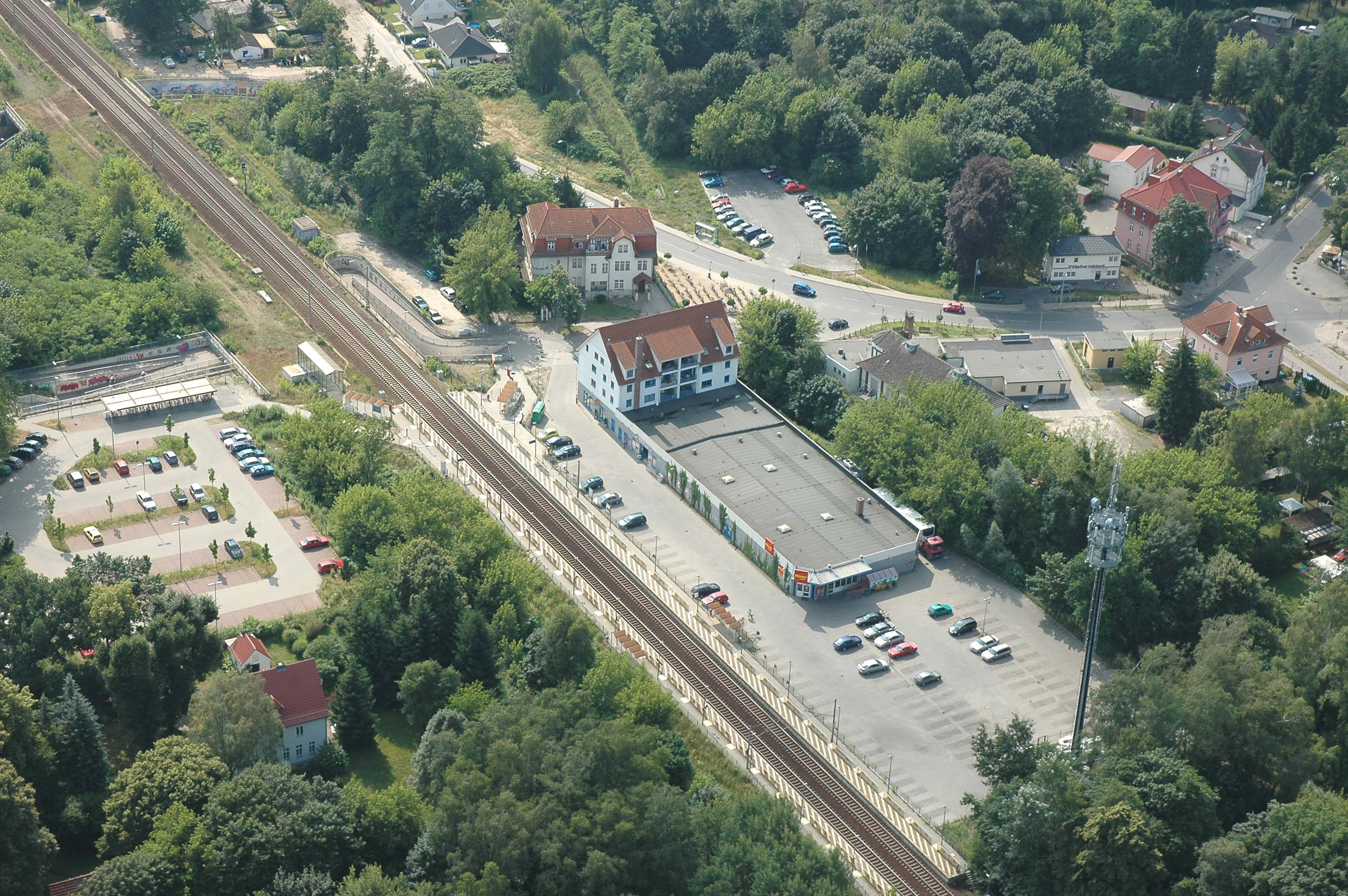
- 2006

General information
- Location: Karl-Marx-Straße 68; 14612 Falkensee; Brandenburg; Germany
- Coordinates: 52.5697°N 13.0511°E
- Owner: DB Netz
- Operator: DB Station&Service
- Lines: Berlin–Hamburg Railway (KBS 209.10/209.14)
- Platforms: 2 side platforms
- Tracks: 2
- Train operators: DB Regio Nordost

Other information
- Station code: 1792
- DS100 code: BFIN
- IBNR: 8011541
- Category: 5
- Fare zone: VBB: Berlin C/5350
- Website: www.bahnhof.de

Services
Preceding station	DB Regio Nordost	Following station
Brieselang towards Nauen	RB 10	Falkensee towards Rangsdorf
Brieselang towards Nauen	RB 14	Falkensee towards Berlin Ostbahnhof
Location
- Location within Brandenburg Location within Germany Location within Europe

Finkenkrug station is a railway station in the Finkenkrug district in the municipality of Falkensee, located in the Havelland district in Brandenburg, Germany.
