= List of railway routes in Berlin and Brandenburg =

The List of railway routes in Berlin and Brandenburg provides a list of all railway routes in Brandenburg and Berlin, eastern Germany. This includes Regional-Express, Regionalbahn and S-Bahn Berlin services. In the route tables, the major stations are shown in bold text. Where intermediate stations are not given, these are replaced by three dots "...". The information is up to date to February 2025.

== Regional services ==
The following Regional-Express and Regionalbahn services run through Berlin and Brandenburg.

Line	Route	Frequency	Material	Operator	Image
FEX; Flughafen-Express	Berlin Hauptbahnhof – Berlin Potsdamer Platz – Berlin Südkreuz – Flughafen BER	15 min	DBAG Class 147 + Double deck stock	DB Regio Nordost	
RE 1	Magdeburg Hbf – Magdeburg-Neustadt – Burg (Magdeburg) – Güsen – Genthin – Wusterwitz – Kirchmöser – Brandenburg – Götz – Groß Kreutz – Werder (Havel) – Potsdam Park Sanssouci – Potsdam Charlottenhof – Potsdam Hbf – Berlin Wannsee – Berlin-Charlottenburg – Berlin Zoologischer Garten – Berlin Hbf – Berlin Friedrichstraße – Berlin Alexanderplatz – Berlin Ostbahnhof – Berlin-Ostkreuz – Erkner – Fangschleuse – Hangelsberg – Fürstenwalde (Spree) – Berkenbrück – Briesen – Jacobsdorf – Pillgram – Frankfurt (Oder)-Rosengarten – Frankfurt (Oder)	Every 60 mins between Magdeburg and Brandenburg, every 30 mins (every 20 mins in the peak) between Brandenburg and Frankfurt, some services in the peak between Frankfurt and Cottbus	Siemens Desiro HC ET 462	ODEG	
RE 2	Nauen – Brieselang – Finkenkrug – Falkensee – Seegefeld – Albrechtshof – Berlin-Spandau – Berlin-Charlottenburg – Berlin Zoologischer Garten – Berlin Hbf – Berlin Friedrichstraße – Berlin Alexanderplatz – Berlin Ostbahnhof – Berlin-Ostkreuz – Königs Wusterhausen – Brand Tropical Islands – Lübben (Spreewald) – Lübbenau – Raddusch – Vetschau – Kunersdorf – Kolkwitz – Cottbus	60 min (Wittenberge-Cottbus); 120 min (Wismar-Cottbus)	DB Class 182 + 5 double deck stock	DB Regio Nordost	
RE 3	Stralsund Hbf – Miltzow – Greifswald – Greifswald Süd – Groß Kiesow – Züssow – Klein Bünzow – Anklam – Ducherow – Ferdinandshof – Jatznick – Pasewalk – Nechlin – Prenzlau – Seehausen – Warnitz – Wilmersdorf – Angermünde – Chorin – Britz – Eberswalde Hbf – Bernau bei Berlin – Berlin-Gesundbrunnen – Berlin Hbf – Berlin Potsdamer Platz – Berlin Südkreuz – Berlin-Lichterfelde Ost – Teltow – Birkengrund – Ludwigsfelde –Luckenwalde – Jüterbog branch line: Schwedt – Schwedt Mitte – Pinnow – Angermünde branch line: Jüterbog – Niedergörsdorf – Blönsdorf – Klebitz – Zahna – Bülzig– Zörnigall – Lutherstadt Wittenberg	Stralsund–Falkenberg 1× per 2 hours (with connecting service RB61 Schwedt–Angermünde) Falkenberg–Elsterwerda-Biehla 1× per 4 hours, Schwedt–Lutherstadt Wittenberg 1× per 2 hours	DB Class 112 + Double deck stock	DB Regio Nordost	
RE 4	(Stendal –) Rathenow – Nennhausen – Buschow – Wustermark – Elstal – Dallgow-Döberitz – Berlin-Staaken – Berlin-Spandau – Berlin Jungfernheide – Berlin Hbf – Berlin Potsdamer Platz – Berlin Südkreuz – Berlin-Lichterfelde Ost – Ludwigsfelde – Thyrow – Trebbin – Woltersdorf – Luckenwalde – Jüterbog – Oehna – Zellendorf – Linda (Elster) – Holzdorf (Elster) – Herzberg (Elster) – Falkenberg (Elster)	Hourly	DB Class 146 + Double deck stock	DB Regio Nordost	
RE 5	Rostock – Güstrow – / Stralsund – Neustrelitz – Oranienburg – Berlin Hbf – Berlin Südkreuz	60 min (Stralsund–Berlin); 120 min	DB class 112 + 6 double Decker coaches	DB Regio Nordost	
RE 6	Wittenberge – Weisen – Perleberg – Groß Pankow – Pritzwalk – Heiligengrabe – Liebenthal – Wittstock – (Dossow – Fretzdorf – Netzeband – Walsleben –) Neuruppin West – Neuruppin Rheinsberger Tor – (Wustrau-Radensleben –) Beetz-Sommerfeld – Kremmen – Velten – Hennigsdorf – Falkensee – Berlin-Spandau – Berlin-Charlottenburg	Hourly	LINT 41	DB Regio Nordost	
RE 7	Dessau Hbf – Roßlau (Elbe) – Jeber-Bergfrieden – Medewitz – Wiesenburg – Bad Belzig – Baitz – Brück – Borkheide – Beelitz-Heilstätten – Seddin – Michendorf – Wilhelmshorst – Potsdam-Rehbrücke – Potsdam Medienstadt Babelsberg – Berlin Wannsee – Berlin-Charlottenburg – Berlin Zoologischer Garten – Berlin Hbf – Berlin Friedrichstraße – Berlin Alexanderplatz – Berlin Ostbahnhof – Berlin-Ostkreuz – Königs Wusterhausen – Zeesen – Bestensee – Groß Köris – Halbe – Oderin – Brand Tropical Islands – Schönwalde – Lubolz – Lübben (Spreewald) – Lübbenau (Spreewald) – Calau (Niederlausitz) – Luckaitztal – Altdöbern – Großräschen – Sedlitz Ost – Senftenberg	Hourly	Talent 2	DB Regio Nordost	
RE 8	Wismar – Dorf Mecklenburg – Bad Kleinen – Lübstorf – Schwerin Hbf – Schwerin Mitte – Schwerin Süd – Holthusen – Sülstorf – Rastow – Lüblow – Ludwigslust – Grabow – Karstädt – Wittenberge – Bad Wilsnack – Glöwen – Breddin – Neustadt – Friesack – Paulinenaue – Nauen – Falkensee – Spandau – Jungfernheide – Berlin Hbf – Potsdamer Platz – Südkreuz – Lichterfelde Ost– Blankenfelde – Dahlewitz – Rangsdorf – Dabendorf – Zossen – Wünsdorf-Waldstadt – Neuhof – Baruth – Klasdorf Glashütte – Golßen – Drahnsdorf – Luckau-Uckro – Walddrehna – Doberlug-Kirchhain – Rückersdorf – Hohenleipisch – Elsterwerda	RE 8 runs every hour between Wittenberge and Elsterwerda, and every two hours between Wismar and Baruth. Between Wittenberge and Baruth, this results in an approximate hourly service. For some trains in the morning and evening, the hourly service extends to Elsterwerda. In Mecklenburg-Western Pomerania, the RE 8 also runs hourly between Wismar and Ludwigslust. Only the cross-border section between Ludwigslust and Wittenberge is served exclusively every two hours. Between Nauen and Wünsdorf-Waldstadt, the RE 8 is supplemented by the RB 10.	Stadler KISS	ODEG	
RE 10	Leipzig – Taucha (Leipzig) – Eilenburg – Torgau – Beilrode – Falkenberg (Elster) – Doberlug-Kirchhain – Finsterwalde (Niederlausitz) – Calau (Nl) – Cottbus – Cottbus-Sandow – Cottbus-Merzdorf – Cottbus-Wilmersdorf Nord – Teichland – Peitz Ost – Jänschwalde – Jänschwalde Ost – Kerkwitz – Guben – Coschen – Wellmitz – Neuzelle – Eisenhüttenstadt – Ziltendorf – Wiesenau – Finkenheerd – Kraftwerk Finkenheerd – Frankfurt (Oder)	Every 2 hours	Siemens Mireo	DB Regio Nordost	
RE 11	Leipzig Hbf – Taucha – Eilenburg – Torgau – Beilrode – Falkenberg (Elster) – Bad Liebenwerda – Elsterwerda-Biehla – Plessa – Lauchhammer – Ruhland – Hosena – Lauta – Schwarzkolm – Hoyerswerda	Every 2 hours	Siemens Mireo	DB Regio Nordost	
RE 13	Cottbus Hbf – Sedlitz Ost – Senftenberg – Ruhland – Lauchhammer – Plessa –Elsterwerda-Biehla – Elsterwerda	Hourly from Monday to Friday from Cottbus to Senftenberg and every two hours to Elsterwerda	Siemens Mireo	DB Regio Nordost	
RE 14	Dessau Hbf – Roßlau (Elbe) – Coswig (Anh) Hp – Lutherstadt Wittenberg-Piesteritz – Lutherstadt Wittenberg Altstadt – Lutherstadt Wittenberg – Labetz – Mühlanger – Elster – Jessen – Annaburg – Fermerswalde – Falkenberg (Elster)	Some trains	Talent 2	DB Regio Südost	
RE 15	Hoyerswerda – Schwarzkollm – Lauta – Hosena – Ruhland – Ortrand – Lampertswalde – Großenhain – Priestewitz – Weinböhla Hp – Coswig – Dresden-Neustadt	Every 2 hours	DB Class 143 + Double deck stock Talent 2	DB Regio Nordost	
RE 18	Cottbus – Drebkau – Neupetershain – Sedlitz Ost – Senftenberg – Ruhland – Ortrand – Lampertswalde – Großenhain – Priestewitz – Weinböhla – Coswig – Dresden-Neustadt	Every 2 hours	DB Class 143 + Double deck stock Talent 2	DB Regio Nordost	
RE 20	Berlin Hbf – Potsdamer Platz – Südkreuz – BER Airport – Königs Wusterhausen – Lübben – Lübbenau (– Vetschau – Cottbus)	Hourly, Mon–Fri	Talent 2, 3 coaches	DB Regio Nordost	
RE 30	Stralsund – Miltzow – Greifswald – Greifswald South – Groß Kiesow – Züssow – Klein Bünzow – Anklam – Ducherow – Ferdinandshof – Jatznick – Pasewalk – Prenzlau – Angermünde	Every 2 hours	Class 143/Traxx AC3 + 5 double-decker carriages	DB Regio Nordost	
RB 10	Südkreuz – Potsdamer Platz – Berlin Hbf – Jungfernheide – Spandau – Albrechtshof – Seegefeld – Falkensee – Finkenkrug – Brieselang – Nauen	Hourly	Stadler KISS	ODEG	
RB 12	Berlin Ostkreuz – Lichtenberg – Berlin-Hohenschönhausen – Oranienburg – Sachsenhausen – Nassenheide – Grüneberg – Löwenberg – Bergsdorf – Zehdenick – Zehdenick-Neuhof – Vogelsang – Hammelspring – Templin – Templin Stadt	Hourly	Siemens Mireo	NEB	
RB 14	Ostbahnhof – Alexanderplatz – Friedrichstraße – Berlin Hbf – Zoologischer Garten – Berlin-Spandau – Albrechtshof – Seegefeld – Falkensee – Finkenkrug – Brieselang – Nauen	Hourly	DBAG Class 182 + Double deck stock	DB Regio Nordost	
RB 20	Oranienburg – Birkenwerder – Hohen Neuendorf West – Hennigsdorf – Golm – Potsdam Park Sanssouci – Potsdam Charlottenhof – Potsdam Hbf – Potsdam Griebnitzsee	Hourly (Monday-Friday)	Traxx + 4–5 double-deck coaches	DB Regio Nordost	
RB 21	Potsdam Hbf – Potsdam Charlottenhof – Potsdam Park Sanssouci – Golm – Marquardt – Priort – Wustermark – Elstal – Dallgow-Döberitz – Staaken – Berlin-Spandau – Berlin Jungfernheide – Berlin Gesundbrunnen	Hourly	Talent 2	DB Regio Nordost	
RB 22	Potsdam Griebnitzsee – Potsdam Hbf – Potsdam Charlottenhof – Potsdam Park Sanssouci – Golm – Potsdam Pirschheide – Saarmund – Ludwigsfelde-Struveshof – Flughafen BER – Königs Wusterhausen	Hourly. Between Potsdam Griebnitzsee and Golm, the trains run combined with the RB 20	Talent 2	DB Regio Nordost	
RB 23	(Ostbahnhof – Alexanderplatz – Friedrichstraße – Berlin Hbf – Zoo – Charlottenburg – Wannsee –) Potsdam Griebnitzsee – Potsdam Hbf – Potsdam Charlottenhof – Potsdam Park Sanssouci – Golm	Hourly. In the peak trains extended to/from Ostbahnhof	Talent 2	DB Regio Nordost	
RB 24	Eberswalde – Melchow – Biesenthal – Rüdnitz – Bernau – Hohenschönhausen – Lichtenberg – Ostkreuz – Schöneweide – Schönefeld – BER Airport – Blankenfelde – Dahlewitz – Rangsdorf – Dabendorf – Zossen – Wünsdorf-Waldstadt	Hourly	DBAG Class 147/EuroSprinter ES64U2 + 5 double-deck coaches	DB Regio Nordost	
RB 25	Berlin Ostkreuz – Berlin-Lichtenberg – Ahrensfelde – Ahrensfelde Friedhof – Ahrensfelde Nord – Blumberg-Rehhahn – Blumberg (b Berlin) – Seefeld (Mark) – Werneuchen	Hourly	Talent 2, Pesa Link	NEB	
RB 26	Berlin Ostkreuz – Berlin-Lichtenberg – Berlin-Mahlsdorf – Strausberg – Herrensee – Rehfelde – Müncheberg (Mark) – Obersdorf – Trebnitz (Mark) – Alt Rosenthal – Seelow-Gusow – Werbig – Golzow (Oderbruch) – Gorgast – Küstrin-Kietz – Kostrzyn (– Witnica – Gorzów Wielkopolski Wieprzyce – Gorzów Wielkopolski – Strzelce Krajeńskie Wschód – Nowe Drezdenko – Krzyż)	Hourly, on weekdays every 30 mins between Lichtenberg and Müncheberg	Pesa Link; DB Class 628 (Berlin-Krzyż)	NEB	
RB 27	(Berlin-Gesundbrunnen –)/Berlin-Karow – Schönerlinde – Schönwalde (Barnim) – Basdorf – Wandlitz – Wandlitzsee – Klosterfelde – Lottschesee – Ruhlsdorf-Zerpenschleuse – Klandorf – Groß Schönebeck (Schorfheide)	Hourly (Berlin-Karow-Klosterfelde), every 2 hours (Klosterfelde-Groß Schönebeck)	SIemens Mireo	NEB	
RB 27	(Berlin-Gesundbrunnen –)/Berlin-Karow – Schönerlinde – Schönwalde (Barnim) – Basdorf – Zühlsdorf – Wensickendorf	Hourly, weekday peaks only	SIemens Mireo	NEB	
RB 31	Elsterwerda-Biehla – Elsterwerda – Prösen Ost – Frauenhain – Zabeltitz – Großenhain Cottb Bf – Priestewitz – Niederau – Weinböhla – Coswig – Radebeul-Naundorf – Niederwartha – Cossebaude – Dresden-Stetzsch – Dresden-Kemnitz – Dresden-Cotta – Dresden-Friedrichstadt – Dresden Hauptbahnhof	Every 2 hours	Talent 2 DB Class 112 + Double deck stock	DB Regio Nordost	
RB 32	Oranienburg – Berlin-Hohenschönhausen –Berlin-Lichtenberg – Berlin Ostkreuz – Berlin-Schöneweide – BER Airport – Birkengrund – Ludwigsfelde	Hourly	DBAG Class 147 + double-deck coaches	DB Regio Nordost	
RB 33	Potsdam Hbf – Potsdam Charlottenhof – Potsdam Pirschheide – Caputh-Geltow – Caputh-Schwielowsee – Ferch-Lienewitz – Beelitz Stadt – Elsholz – Buchholz – Treuenbrietzen – Treuenbrietzen Süd – Altes Lager – Jüterbog'	Hourly	LINT 54	ODEG	
RB 34	Stendal – Hämerten – Schönhausen (Elbe) – Großwudicke – Rathenow	Every 2 hours	LINT 27	HANS	
RB 35	Fürstenwalde (Spree) – Fürstenwalde (Spree) Süd – Bad Saarow – Bad Saarow Klinikum – Bad Saarow-Pieskow	Hourly	Siemens Mireo	NEB	
RB 36	Königs Wusterhausen – Niederlehme – Zernsdorf – Kablow) – Friedersdorf – Kummersdorf – Storkow (Mark) – Hubertushöhe – Wendisch-Rietz – Lindenberg (Mark) – Buckow – **Beeskow** – Oegeln – Schneeberg (Mark) – Grunow (Niederlausitz) – Mixdorf – Müllrose – Helenesee – Frankfurt (Oder)-Neuberesinchen – Frankfurt (Oder)	Hourly	Stadler Regio-Shuttle RS1		
RB 37	Berlin-Wannsee – Potsdam Medienstadt Babelsberg – Potsdam-Rehbrücke – Wilhelmshorst – Michendorf – Beelitz Stadt	Hourly on weekdays and every two hours on weekends	Alstom Coradia LINT	ODEG	
RB 43	Frankfurt (Oder) – Kraftwerk Finkenheerd – Finkenheerd – Wiesenau – Ziltendorf – Eisenhüttenstadt – Neuzelle – Wellmitz – Coschen – Guben – Kerkwitz – Jänschwalde Ost – Jänschwalde – Peitz Ost – Teichland – Cottbus-Willmersdorf Nord – Cottbus-Merzdorf – Cottbus-Sandow – Cottbus Hauptbahnhof – Kolkwitz Süd – Calau – Gollmitz – Finsterwalde – Doberlug-Kirchhain – Schönborn – Beutersitz – Uebigau – Falkenberg (Elster)	Every 2 hours	Siemens Mireo	DB Regio Nordost	
RB 45	Elsterwerda – Prösen – Prösen West – Gröditz (Riesa) – Tiefenau – Wülknitz – Zeithain – Riesa – Seerhausen – Stauchitz – Ostrau – Zschaitz – Döbeln Hbf – Limmritz (Sachs) – Mittweida – Altmitweida – Ottendorf (Mittweida) – Oberlichtenau – Chemnitz Kinderwaldstätte – Chemnitz Hbf	Hourly, every 2 hours on weekends	Alstom Coradia Continental	Mitteldeutsche Regiobahn	
RB 46	Cottbus – Cottbus-Sandow – Klinge – Forst (Lausitz)	Hourly in conjunction with RB 93, hourly on weekends	Siemens Desiro Classic	ODEG	
RB 49	Cottbus Hauptbahnhof – Leuthen – Drebkau – Neupetershain – Bahnsdorf – Sedlitz Ost – Senftenberg – Schwarzheide Ost – Ruhland – Lauchhammer – Plessa – Elsterwerda-Biehla – Bad Liebenwerda – Falkenberg (Elster)	Every 2 hours	Siemens Mireo, 3 part	DB Regio Nordost	
RB 51	Rathenow – Mögelin – Premnitz Nord – Premnitz Zentrum – Döberitz – Pritzerbe – Fohrde – Görden – Brandenburg Altstadt – Brandenburg	Hourly	Lint 54, Stadler GTW	ODEG	
RB 51	Dessau – Roßlau (Elbe) – Meinsdorf – Klieken – Coswig (Anh) – Griebo – Lutherstadt Wittenberg-Piesteritz – Lutherstadt Wittenberg Altstadt – Lutherstadt Wittenberg – Mühlanger – Elster – Jessen – Annaburg – Fermerswalde – Falkenberg (Elster)	Every 2 hours	Talent 2	DB Regio Südost	
RB 54	Berlin-Lichtenberg – Berlin-Gesundbrunnen – Löwenberg (Mark) – Herzberg – Lindow – Rheinsberg	Every 2 hours	Pesa Link, 2 part	NEB	
RB 55	Kremmen – Schwante – Vehlefanz – Bärenklau – Velten (Mark) – Hennigsdorf	Hourly	Stadler GTW	DB Regio Nordost	
RB 60	Eberswalde Hbf – Niederfinow – Falkenberg (Mark) – Bad Freienwalde (Oder) – Altranft – Wriezen – Neutrebbin – Letschin – Werbig – Seelow (Mark) – Frankfurt (Oder)	Hourly	Stadler Regio-Shuttle RS1	NEB	
RB 61	Schwedt – Schwedt Mitte – Pinnow – Angermünde	Hourly	Stadler Regio-Shuttle RS1	NEB	
RB 63	Eberswalde Hauptbahnhof – Britz – Golzow – Alt Hüttendorf – Joachimsthal Kaiserbahnhof – Joachimsthal	Hourly	Stadler Regio-Shuttle RS1	NEB	
RB 65	Cottbus Hauptbahnhof – Neuhausen– Bagenz – Spremberg – Schleife – Weißwasser – Rietschen – Hähnichen – Uhsmannsdorf – Horka – Kodersdorf – Görlitz – Görlitz-Weinhübel – Hagenwerder – Krzewina Zgorzelecka – Hirschfelde – Zittau	Hourly	Siemens Desiro Classic	ODEG	
RB 73	Neustadt – Wusterhausen – Kyritz – Kyritz Am Bürgerpark – Wutike – Rosenwinkel – Blumenthal – Bölzke – Sarnow – Pritzwalk	Monday-Friday: hourly (Neustadt-Kyritz), 4 train pairs (Neustadt-Pritzwalk); weekends: the three train pairs of RB 73 and RB 74 run through from Neustadt via Kyritz and Pritzwalk to Meyenburg.	DWA LVT/S (classes 672.0/672.9, 672)	HANS	
RB 74	Pritzwalk West – Pritzwalk – Pritzwalk Hainholz – Falkenhagen Gewerbepark Prignitz – Brügge (Prign) – Meyenburg (– Wendisch Priborn – Ganzlin – Plau am See)	Monday-Friday: every 2 or 3 hours; weekends: 3 train pairs of RB 73 and RB 74 run through to Plau am See	DWA LVT/S (classes 672.0/672.9, 672)	HANS	
RB 91	(Berlin-Lichtenberg –) Frankfurt (Oder) – Słubice – Kunowice – Rzepin – Jerzmanice Lubuskie – Gądków Wielki – Budachów – Bytnica – Radnica – Będów – Nietkowice – Czerwieńsk – Przylep – Zielona Góra Glowna	Infrequent	Pesa Link	DB Regio Nordost Polregio	
RB 92	Guben – Walowice – Wezyska – Krosno Odrzanskie – Ciemnice – Laski Odrzanskie – Nietkow – Czerwiensk – Zielona Gora Przylep – Zielona Gora Glowna	Infrequent	Pesa Link	DB Regio Nordost Polregio	
RB 93	Cottbus – Cottbus-Sandow – Klinge – Forst (Lausitz) – Zasieki – Tuplice – Tuplice Dębinka – Lipinki Łużyckie – Sieniawa Żarska – Żary – Żagań	Together with the RB 46 line, roughly hourly between Cottbus and Forst. Less frequent east of Forst	Stadler GTW	DB Regio Nordost Polregio	

== Berlin S-Bahn ==
All are operated by Berlin S-Bahn.

Line	Route	KBS	Frequency	Material	Image
S1	**Wannsee** – Nikolassee – Schlachtensee – Mexikoplatz – Zehlendorf – Sundgauer Straße – Lichterfelde West – Botanischer Garten – Rathaus Steglitz – Feuerbachstraße – Friedenau – Schöneberg – Julius-Leber-Brücke – Yorckstraße – Anhalter Bahnhof – Potsdamer Platz – Brandenburger Tor – Friedrichstraße – Oranienburger Straße – Nordbahnhof – Humboldthain – Gesundbrunnen – Bornholmer Straße – Wollankstraße – Schönholz – Wilhelmsruh – Wittenau - Waidmannslust – Hermsdorf – **Frohnau** – Hohen Neuendorf – Birkenwerder – Borgsdorf – Lehnitz – **Oranienburg**	200.1	6× per hour	DBAG Class 481	
S2	**Blankenfelde** – Mahlow – **Lichtenrade** – Schichauweg – Buckower Chaussee – Marienfelde – Attilastraße – Priesterweg – Südkreuz – Yorckstraße – Anhalter Bahnhof – Potsdamer Platz – Brandenburger Tor – Friedrichstraße – Oranienburger Straße – Nordbahnhof – Humboldthain – Gesundbrunnen – Bornholmer Straße – Pankow – Pankow-Heinersdorf – Blankenburg – Karow - **Buch** – Röntgental – Zepernick – Bernau-Friedenstal – **Bernau**	200.2	6× per hour	DBAG Class 481	
S25	**Teltow Stadt** – Lichterfelde Süd – Osdorfer Straße – Lichterfelde Ost – Lankwitz – Südende – Priesterweg – Südkreuz – Yorckstraße – Anhalter Bahnhof – Potsdamer Platz – Brandenburger Tor – Friedrichstraße – Oranienburger Straße – Nordbahnhof – Humboldthain – Gesundbrunnen – Bornholmer Straße – Wollankstraße – Schönholz – Alt-Reinickendorf – Karl-Bonhoeffer-Nervenklinik - Eichborndamm – Tegel – Schulzendorf – Heiligensee – **Hennigsdorf**	200.25	3× per hour	DBAG Class 481	
S26	**Teltow Stadt** – Lichterfelde Süd – Osdorfer Straße – Lichterfelde Ost – Lankwitz – Südende – Priesterweg – Südkreuz – Yorckstraße – Anhalter Bahnhof – **Potsdamer Platz** (– Brandenburger Tor – Friedrichstraße – Oranienburger Straße – Nordbahnhof – Humboldthain – Gesundbrunnen – Bornholmer Straße – Wollankstraße – Schönholz – Wilhelmsruh – Wittenau – **Waidmannslust**)	200.26	6× per hour	DBAG Class 481	
S3	**Erkner** – Wilhelmshagen – Rahnsdorf – **Friedrichshagen** – Hirschgarten – Köpenick – Wuhlheide – Karlshorst – Rummelsburg Betriebsbahnhof – Rummelsburg – Ostkreuz – Warschauer Straße – **Ostbahnhof** – Jannowitzbrücke – Alexanderplatz – Hackescher Markt – Friedrichstraße – Hauptbahnhof – Bellevue – Tiergarten – Zoologischer Garten – Savignyplatz – Charlottenburg – Westkreuz – Grunewald – Messe Süd – Heerstraße – Olympiastadion – Pichelsberg – Stresow – **Spandau**	200.3	6× per hour	DBAG Class 480DBAG Class 481	
Ringbahn (clockwise)	**Südkreuz** – Schöneberg – Innsbrucker Platz – Bundesplatz – Heidelberger Platz – Hohenzollerndamm – Halensee – Westkreuz – Messe Nord/ICC – Westend – Jungfernheide – Beusselstraße – Westhafen – Wedding – Gesundbrunnen – Schönhauser Allee – Prenzlauer Allee – Greifswalder Straße – Landsberger Allee – Storkower Straße – Frankfurter Allee – Ostkreuz – Treptower Park – Sonnenallee – Neukölln – Hermannstraße – Tempelhof – **Südkreuz**	200.4	6× per hour	DBAG Class 481; DBAG Class 484	
Ringbahn (counter-clockwise)	**Südkreuz** – Tempelhof – Hermannstraße – Neukölln – Sonnenallee – Treptower Park – Ostkreuz – Frankfurter Allee – Storkower Straße – Landsberger Allee – Greifswalder Straße – Prenzlauer Allee – Schönhauser Allee – Gesundbrunnen – Wedding – Westhafen – Beusselstraße – Jungfernheide – Westend – Messe Nord/ICC – Westkreuz – Halensee – Hohenzollerndamm – Heidelberger Platz – Bundesplatz – Innsbrucker Platz – Schöneberg – **Südkreuz**	200.4	6× per hour	DBAG Class 481; DBAG Class 484	
S45 Berlin Brandenburg Airport	**Flughafen BER** – Waßmannsdorf – Schönefeld (bei Berlin) – Grünbergallee – Altglienicke – Adlershof – Johannisthal – Schöneweide – Baumschulenweg – Köllnische Heide – Neukölln – Hermannstraße – Tempelhof – **Südkreuz**	200.45	3× per hour	DBAG Class 481	
S46	**Königs Wusterhausen** – Wildau – Zeuthen – Eichwalde – Grünau – Adlershof – Johannisthal – Schöneweide – Baumschulenweg – Köllnische Heide – Neukölln – Hermannstraße – **Tempelhof** – **Südkreuz** – Schöneberg – Innsbrucker Platz – Bundesplatz – Heidelberger Platz – Hohenzollerndamm – Halensee – Westkreuz – Messe Nord/ICC – **Westend**	200.46	3× per hour	DBAG Class 484	
S47	**Spindlersfeld** – Oberspree – **Schöneweide** (– Baumschulenweg – Köllnische Heide – Neukölln – **Hermannstraße**)	200.47	3× per hour	DBAG Class 483; DBAG Class 484	
S5	**Strausberg Nord** – Strausberg Stadt – Hegermühle – **Strausberg** – Petershagen Nord – Fredersdorf – Neuenhagen – Hoppegarten – Birkenstein – **Mahlsdorf** – Kaulsdorf – Wuhletal – Biesdorf – Friedrichsfelde Ost – Lichtenberg – Nöldnerplatz – Ostkreuz – Warschauer Straße – Ostbahnhof – Jannowitzbrücke – Alexanderplatz – Hackescher Markt – Friedrichstraße – Hauptbahnhof – Bellevue – Tiergarten – Zoologischer Garten – Savignyplatz – Charlottenburg – **Westkreuz**	200.5	6× per hour	DBAG Class 481	
S7	**Ahrensfelde** – Mehrower Allee – Raoul-Wallenberg-Straße – Marzahn – Poelchaustraße – Springpfuhl – Friedrichsfelde Ost – Lichtenberg – Nöldnerplatz – Ostkreuz – Warschauer Straße – Ostbahnhof – Jannowitzbrücke – Alexanderplatz – Hackescher Markt – Friedrichstraße – Hauptbahnhof – Bellevue – Tiergarten – Zoologischer Garten – Savignyplatz – Charlottenburg – Westkreuz – Grunewald – Nikolassee – Wannsee - Griebnitzsee – Babelsberg – **Potsdam Hbf**	200.7	6× per hour	DBAG Class 481	
S75	**Wartenberg** – Hohenschönhausen – Gehrenseestraße – Springpfuhl – Friedrichsfelde Ost – **Lichtenberg** – Nöldnerplatz – Ostkreuz – **Warschauer Straße**	200.75	6× per hour	DBAG Class 481	
S8	**(Zeuthen** – Eichwalde –) **Grünau** – Johannisthal – Schöneweide – Baumschulenweg – Plänterwald – Treptower Park – Ostkreuz – Frankfurter Allee – Storkower Straße – Landsberger Allee – Greifswalder Straße – Prenzlauer Allee – Schönhauser Allee – Bornholmer Straße – Pankow – Pankow-Heinersdorf – **Blankenburg** – Mühlenbeck-Mönchmühle – Schönfließ – Bergfelde – Hohen Neuendorf – **Birkenwerder (b Berlin)**	200.8	3× per hour	DBAG Class 483; DBAG Class 484	
S85	**(Grünau** – Adlershof – Johannisthal –) **Schöneweide** – Baumschulenweg – Plänterwald – Treptower Park – Ostkreuz – Frankfurter Allee – Storkower Straße – Landsberger Allee – Greifswalder Straße – Prenzlauer Allee – Schönhauser Allee – Bornholmer Straße – **Pankow**	200.85	3× per hour	DBAG Class 481; DBAG Class 485	
S9 Berlin Brandenburg Airport	**Flughafen BER** – Waßmannsdorf – Schönefeld (bei Berlin) – Grünbergallee – Altglienicke – Adlershof – Johannisthal – Schöneweide – Baumschulenweg – Plänterwald – Treptower Park – Warschauer Straße – Ostbahnhof – Jannowitzbrücke – Alexanderplatz – Hackescher Markt – Friedrichstraße – Hauptbahnhof – Bellevue – Tiergarten – Zoologischer Garten – Savignyplatz – Charlottenburg – Westkreuz – Messe Süd – Heerstraße – Olympiastadion - Pichelsberg – Stresow – **Spandau**	200.9	3× per hour	DBAG Class 481	

=== TES ===
Since September 2023, almost 30 train pairs have been operating Monday to Friday on behalf of Tesla, Inc., providing publicly accessible factory transport to the Gigafactory Berlin-Brandenburg.

Line	Railways	Operator	Route	Material
TES	Berlin–Wrocław; Fangschleuse–Freienbrink railway	NEB	Erkner – Fangschleuse Tesla Süd	Siemens Mireo Smart

== See also ==
- List of scheduled railway routes in Germany
