= Dallgow-Döberitz station =

Railway station in Germany

Dallgow-Döberitz
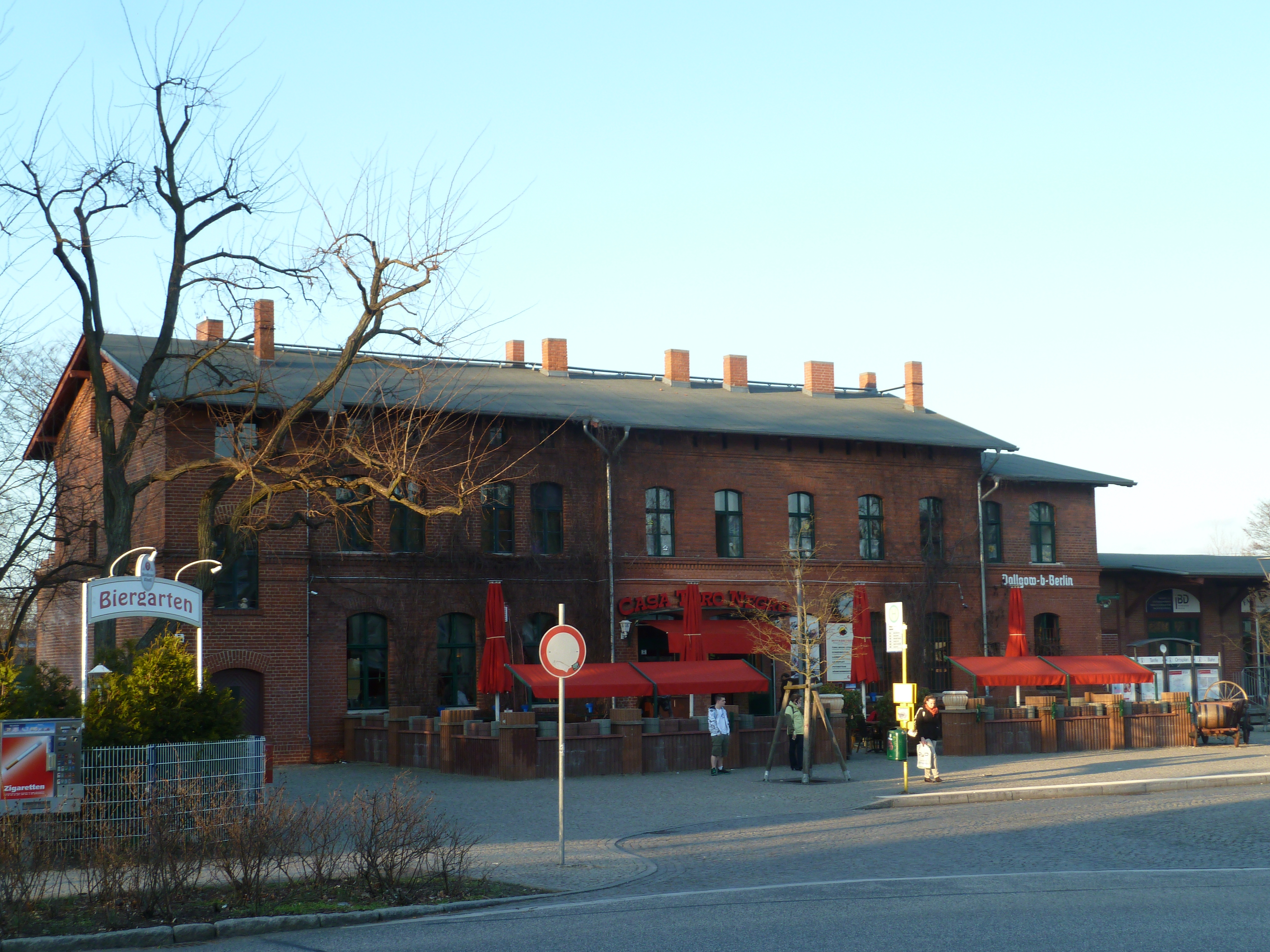
- Dallgow-Döberitz railway station

General information
- Location: Dallgow-Döberitz, Brandenburg, Germany
- Coordinates: 52.3237°N 13.0334°E
- Line: Berlin–Lehrte railway
- Platforms: 2

Construction
- Accessible: Yes

Other information
- Station code: 1116
- DS100 code: BDL
- Category: 5
- Fare zone: VBB: Berlin C/5350
- Website: www.bahnhof.de

History
- Opening: 1871

Services
Preceding station	DB Regio Nordost	Following station
Elstal towards Rathenow or Stendal Hbf	RE 4	Berlin-Staaken towards Jüterbog or Falkenberg (Elster)
Elstal towards Potsdam Hbf	RB 21	Berlin-Staaken towards Berlin Gesundbrunnen
Location

Dallgow-Döberitz (German: Bahnhof Dallgow-Döberitz) is a railway station located in Dallgow-Döberitz, Germany. The station is located on the Berlin-Lehrte Railway. The train services are operated by Deutsche Bahn and Ostdeutsche Eisenbahn (ODEG).

The station was opened with the construction of the Berlin–Lehrte railway in 1871 as Dallgow. It was renamed Dallgow-Döberitz in 1898. In 1996, as the railway was converted into a high-speed line, an island platform was built for the regional traffic.

The station is served by the following services as of 2026:

- Regional service RE 4 (Stendal –) Rathenow – Dallgow-Döberitz – Berlin Jungfernheide – Berlin Südkreuz – Ludwigsfelde – Jüterbog (– Falkenberg)
- Regional service RB 21 Potsdam – Wustermark – Elstal – Berlin-Spandau – Berlin Gesundbrunnen
