= Elstal station =

Railway station in Germany

Elstal
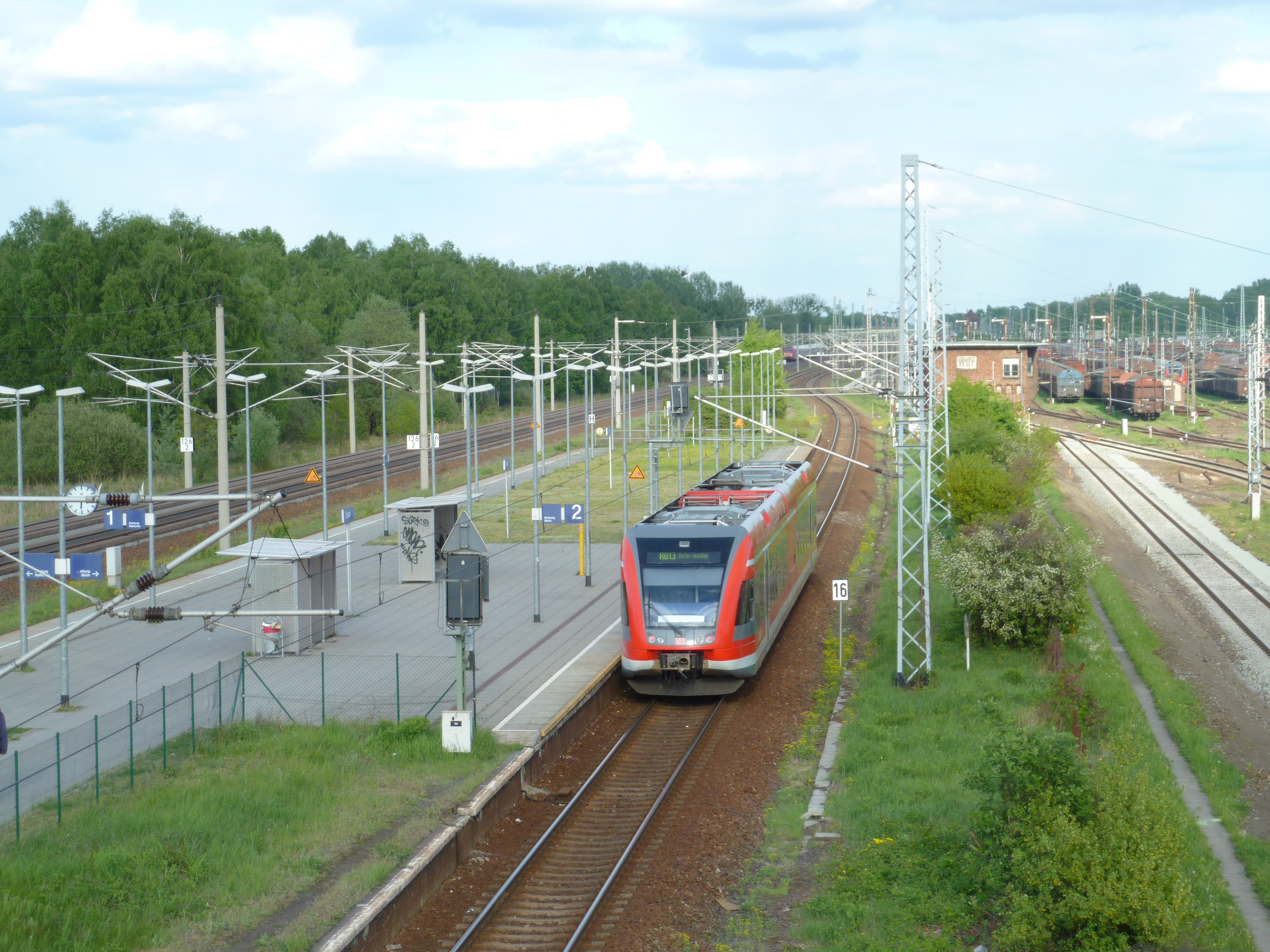
- Elstal railway station

General information
- Location: Elstal, Brandenburg; Germany
- Coordinates: 52.5475°N 13.0001°E
- Platforms: 2

Construction
- Accessible: Yes

Other information
- Station code: 6958
- Category: 6
- Fare zone: VBB: Berlin C and Potsdam C/5549
- Website: www.bahnhof.de

Services
Preceding station	DB Regio Nordost	Following station
Wustermark towards Rathenow or Stendal Hbf	RE 4	Dallgow-Döberitz towards Jüterbog or Falkenberg (Elster)
Wustermark towards Potsdam Hbf	RB 21	Dallgow-Döberitz towards Berlin Gesundbrunnen
Location

Elstal (German: Bahnhof Elstal) is a railway station located in Wustermark, Germany. The station is located on the Berlin-Lehrte Railway. The train services are operated by Deutsche Bahn and Ostdeutsche Eisenbahn (ODEG).

Next to the station is a large goods yard, including two former turntables.

The station is served by the following services as of 2026:

- Regional service RE 4 (Stendal –) Rathenow – Elstal – Dallgow-Döberitz – Berlin Jungfernheide – Berlin Südkreuz – Ludwigsfelde – Jüterbog (– Falkenberg)
- Regional service RB 21 Potsdam – Wustermark – Elstal – Berlin-Spandau – Berlin Gesundbrunnen
