= Class 484 =

Class 484 may refer to:

- British Rail Class 484
- DBAG Class 483 and 484
- SB Cargo TRAXX class Re484 locomotives
