= Staaken station =

Railway station in Berlin, Germany

Staaken
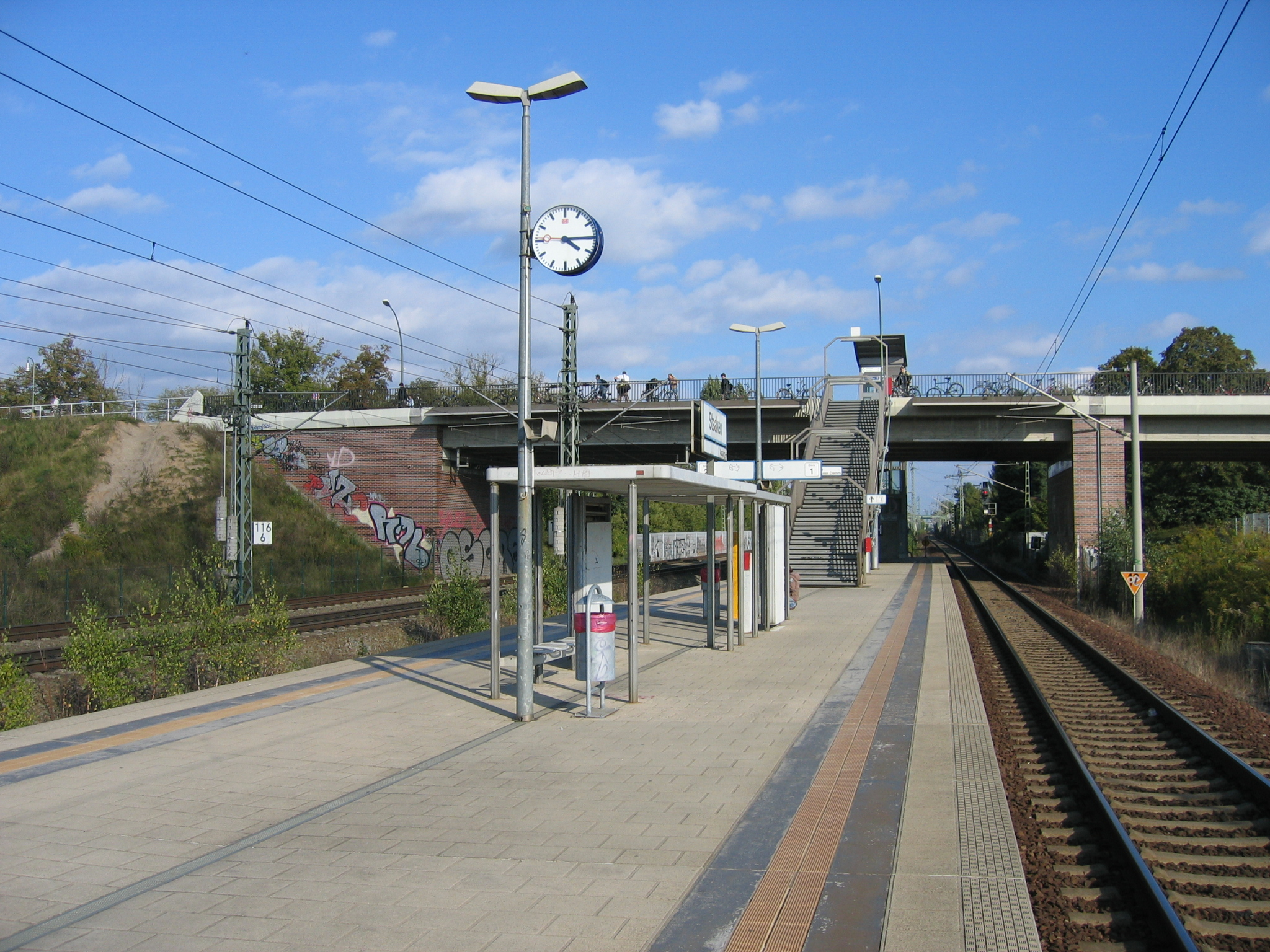

General information
- Location: Staaken, Spandau, Berlin; Germany
- Coordinates: 52°32′16″N 13°08′29″E
- Line: Lehrte Railway
- Platforms: 2

Construction
- Accessible: Yes

Other information
- Station code: 564
- DS100 code: BSTA
- Category: 6
- Fare zone: VBB: Berlin B/5656
- Website: www.bahnhof.de

History
- Opened: 15 August 1900; 126 years ago
- Closed: 18 September 1980 (strike), officially 28 September 1980; 45 years ago
- Rebuilt: 1951: new platform in West Staaken, opposite to station in East Staaken; 1976: new station 700 further west 1998: new main line station 700 further east
- Electrified: 3 August 1951; 75 years ago, 750 V DC system (3rd rail) main line: 13 December 1998; 27 years ago, 15 kV AC system (overhead)
- Former names: 1910-1937 Staaken; 1937-1980 Berlin-Staaken; 1962-1990 Staaken

Key dates
- 13 August 1961 - 4 March 1962: operation interrupted
- 1995 - 1998: operation interrupted

Services
Preceding station	DB Regio Nordost	Following station
Dallgow-Döberitz towards Rathenow or Stendal Hbf	RE 4	Berlin-Spandau towards Jüterbog or Falkenberg (Elster)
Dallgow-Döberitz towards Potsdam Hbf	RB 21	Berlin-Spandau towards Berlin Gesundbrunnen
Location

Berlin-Staaken is a railway station located in Staaken, a locality in the Spandau district of Berlin. It is one of only two Deutsche Bahn stations in Berlin not served by the S-Bahn; Albrechtshof station is the other.

== Overview ==
The station is situated on the "Lehrter Bahn" Berlin-Wolfsburg-Hannover, between the stations of Berlin Spandau and Dallgow-Döberitz. The station has two platforms.

The first station in Staaken was opened in 1900. That should change drastically after the Second World War. Staaken was divided by the Allies. The continuous train traffic was interrupted. On West Berlin side 1951 the rapid-transit railway of Spandau west was extended by a station to Staaken. Already in the 1930s an extension of the rapid-transit railway to the Brandenburg Wustermark had been aimed at. The S-Bahn station Berlin-Staaken was in West Berlin. On the other side of the Nennhauser dam was the station Staaken Kr. Nauen (at the former freight yard Staaken) in the GDR area, from where suburban trains in the direction of Wustermark and Nauen reversed. To change trains between S-Bahn and suburban trains, passengers had to change stations and pass a checkpoint. With the building of the Wall, another Staaken station was added far before the border: Staaken (GDR). He served the control of freight trains between West Berlin and the Federal territory or the GDR.

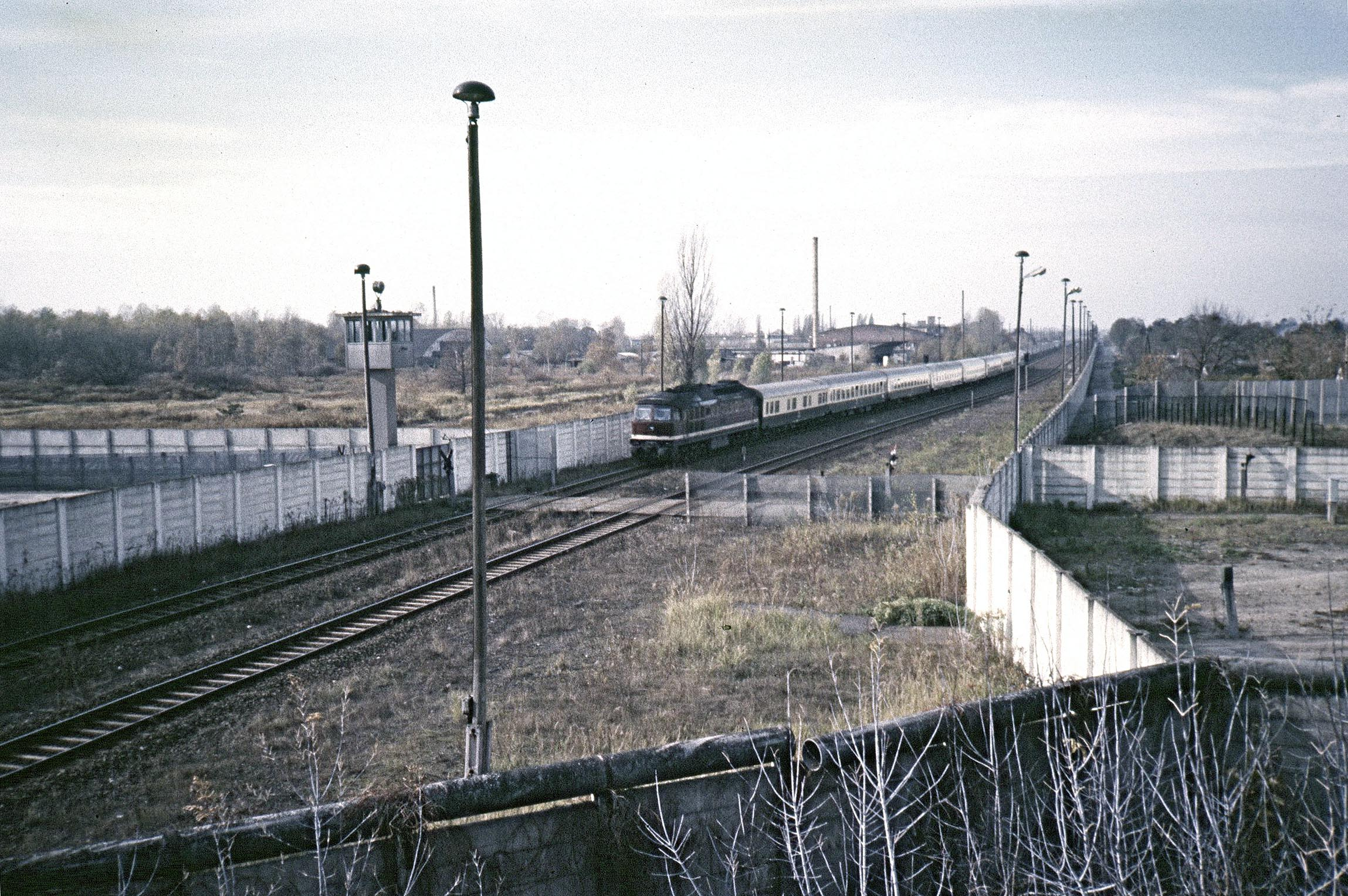
Transit train from Hamburg passes through the border facilities at Staaken station, 1986

When Staaken was also to be passed by transit trains of travel traffic between Berlin and Hamburg in 1976, a new control station Staaken (GDR) was built further west. Before, since 1961, the Hamburg long-distance trains had to take the detour via the Berlin outer ring and Griebnitzsee. The transit tracks were sealed off between border and control station on both sides by a high protective wall. The station Staaken Kr. Nauen for domestic traffic within the GDR was moved west to the Feldstraße. There the passenger trains from direction Wustermark ended at a separate head track south of the protective wall to the transit tracks.

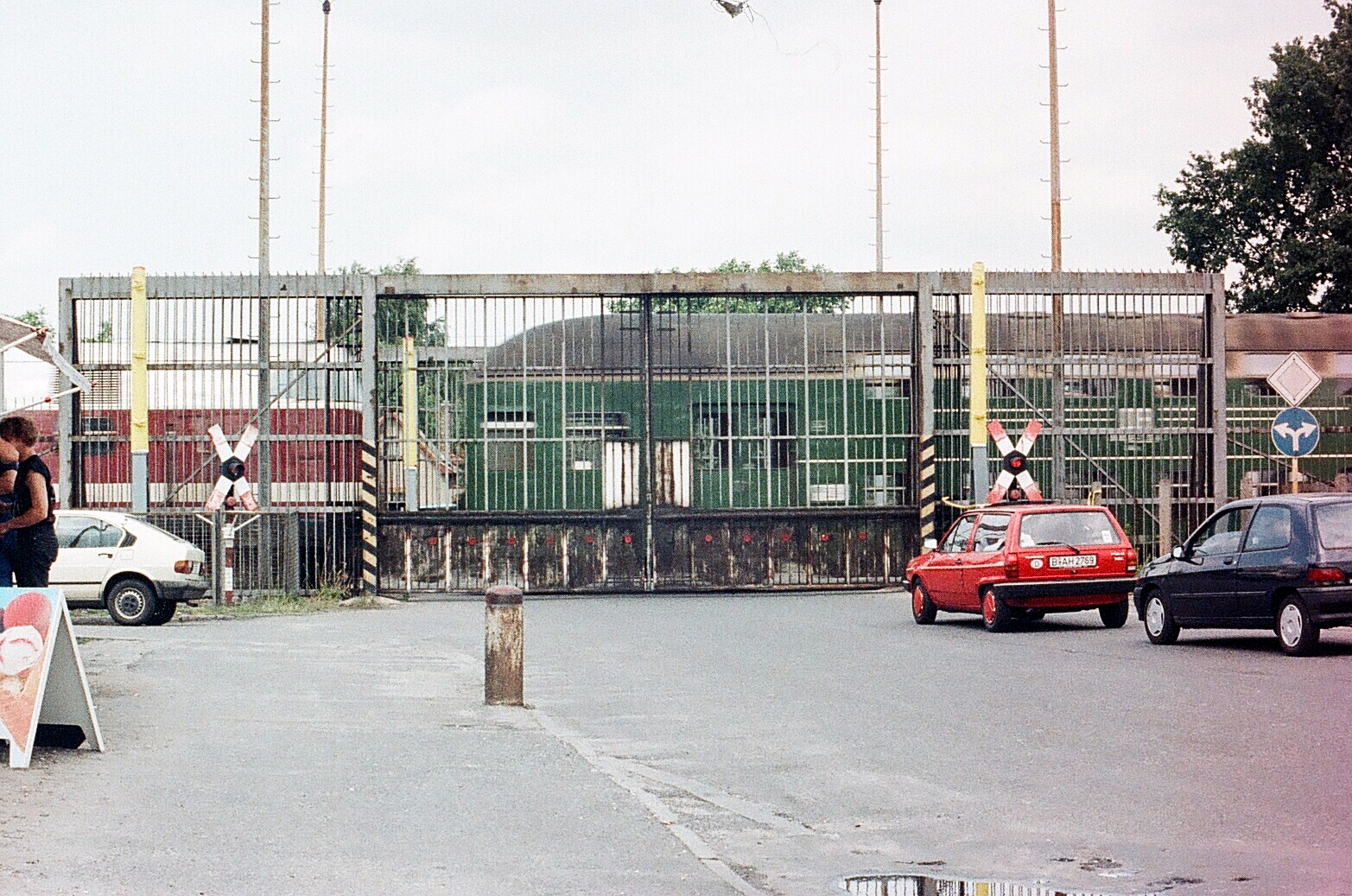
Formerly located in the death strip railway crossing "Elephant Gate", 1991

At the new Staaken Kr. Nauen station, the intersection of the field road and the transit tracks was heavily secured. Because the protective wall had to be interrupted, massive roller shutters instead of barriers secured the sealed transit corridor in train traffic through Staaken.

On West Berlin side of the S-Bahn operation ended after Staaken after not even 30 years as a result of the Berlin S-Bahn strike in 1980. After the takeover of the Berlin S-Bahn by the Berlin transport operations in 1984 was again a S-Bahn-development Staakens considered.

With the reunification all Staaken became part of Berlin-Spandau again. In regional traffic drove from 1990 again through trains from Nauen on the Lehrter Bahn to Berlin-Spandau, from 1991 completely replaced the previous train offer. The trains could no longer approach the head track on Feldstraße, the stop in Staaken was dropped. On pressure of the population drove first weekdays still commuter trains between Dallgow (later Dallgow-Döberitz) and Staaken, before a makeshift stop on the main tracks was built, so again a connection from Staaken towards Spandau was created. As of 1996, the Lehrter Bahn was expanded as one of the transport projects German unit for a top speed of 250 km / h. The rail traffic was replaced by buses for two years. The old Staakener stations were demolished during the construction. In 1998, the newly built platform was inaugurated on the side of the ICE route in the amount of existing from 1951 to 1976 station.

Also in the area of Staaken is the Berlin-Albrechtshof station.

== Train services ==
The station is served by the following services as of 2026:

- Regional service RE 4 (Stendal –) Rathenow – Wustermark – Berlin-Staaken – Berlin – Ludwigsfelde – Jüterbog (– Falkenberg (Elster))
- Regional service RB 21 Potsdam – Wustermark – Berlin-Staaken – Berlin-Spandau – Berlin Gesundbrunnen

== See also ==
- List of railway stations in the Berlin area
