= Brieselang station =

Railway station in Germany

Brieselang

General information
- Location: Platz des Friedens; 14656 Brieselang; Brandenburg; Germany
- Coordinates: 52.5825°N 13.0017°E
- Owner: DB Netz
- Operator: DB Station&Service
- Lines: Berlin–Hamburg Railway (KBS 209.10/209.14)
- Platforms: 2 side platforms
- Tracks: 4
- Train operators: DB Regio Nordost

Other information
- Station code: 885
- DS100 code: BBRI
- IBNR: 8013472
- Category: 6
- Fare zone: VBB: Berlin C/5449
- Website: www.bahnhof.de

Services
Preceding station	DB Regio Nordost	Following station
Nauen Terminus	RB 10	Finkenkrug towards Rangsdorf
Nauen Terminus	RB 14	Finkenkrug towards Berlin Ostbahnhof
Location
- Location within Brandenburg Location within Germany Location within Europe

Brieselang station is a railway station in the municipality of Brieselang, located in the Havelland district in Brandenburg, Germany.
