= Falkensee station =

Railway station in Falkensee, Germany

Falkensee
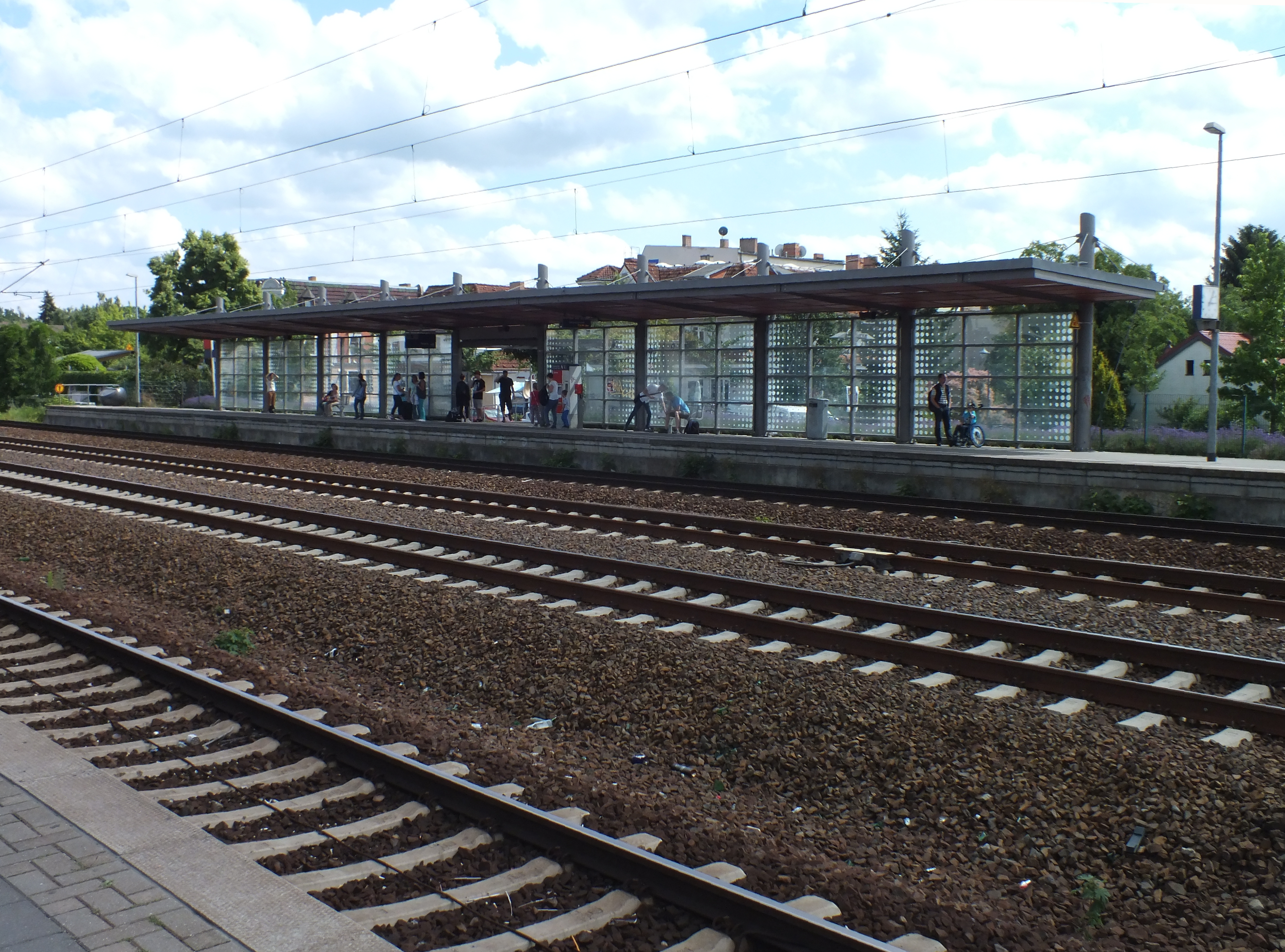
- Falkensee station

General information
- Location: Falkensee, Brandenburg, Germany
- Coordinates: 52°33′35″N 13°05′20″E
- Owner: DB Netz
- Operator: DB Station&Service
- Lines: Berlin–Hamburg Railway (KBS 209.10/209.14)
- Platforms: 2
- Tracks: 4

Construction
- Accessible: Yes

Other information
- Fare zone: VBB: Berlin C/5350
- Website: www.bahnhof.de

History
- Opened: 1848; 178 years ago
- Closed: defunct since 9 October 1961; 64 years ago
- Rebuilt: 11 August 1996
- Electrified: 14 August 1951; 75 years ago main line: 28 September 1983; 42 years ago
- Former names: 1848-1927 Seegefeld

Services
Preceding station	DB Regio Nordost	Following station
Nauen towards BER Airport	RE 2	Berlin-Spandau towards Cottbus Hbf
Hennigsdorf towards Wittenberge	RE 6	Berlin-Spandau towards Berlin-Charlottenburg
Finkenkrug towards Nauen	RB 14	Seegefeld towards Berlin Ostbahnhof
Preceding station	Ostdeutsche Eisenbahn	Following station
Nauen towards Wismar	RE 8	Berlin-Spandau towards Elsterwerda
Finkenkrug towards Nauen	RB 10	Seegefeld towards Wünsdorf-Waldstadt
Location

Falkensee (German: Bahnhof Falkensee) is a railway station in the town of Falkensee, Brandenburg, Germany. The station lies on the Berlin–Hamburg railway and the train services are operated by Deutsche Bahn and Ostdeutsche Eisenbahn.

== Rail services ==
The station is served by the following service:

- RE 2: Nauen – Falkensee – Berlin-Spandau – Berlin Zoologischer Garten – Berlin – Berlin Ostbahnhof – Königs Wusterhausen – Lübben (Spreewald) – Cottbus
- RE 6: Wismar – Schwerin – Ludwigslust – Wittenberge – Nauen – Falkensee – Berlin – Berlin Potsdamer Platz – Berlin Südkreuz – Wünsdorf-Waldstadt – Elsterwerda
- RE 8: Wismar – Schwerin – Ludwigslust – Wittenberge – Nauen – Falkensee – Berlin – Berlin Potsdamer Platz – Berlin Südkreuz –Wünsdorf-Waldstadt – Elsterwerda
- RB 10: Nauen – Falkensee – Berlin – Berlin Südkreuz – Rangsdorf
- RB 14: Nauen – Falkensee – Berlin – Berlin Ostbahnhof
