= Fretzdorf station =

Railway station near Wittstock, Germany

Fretzdorf
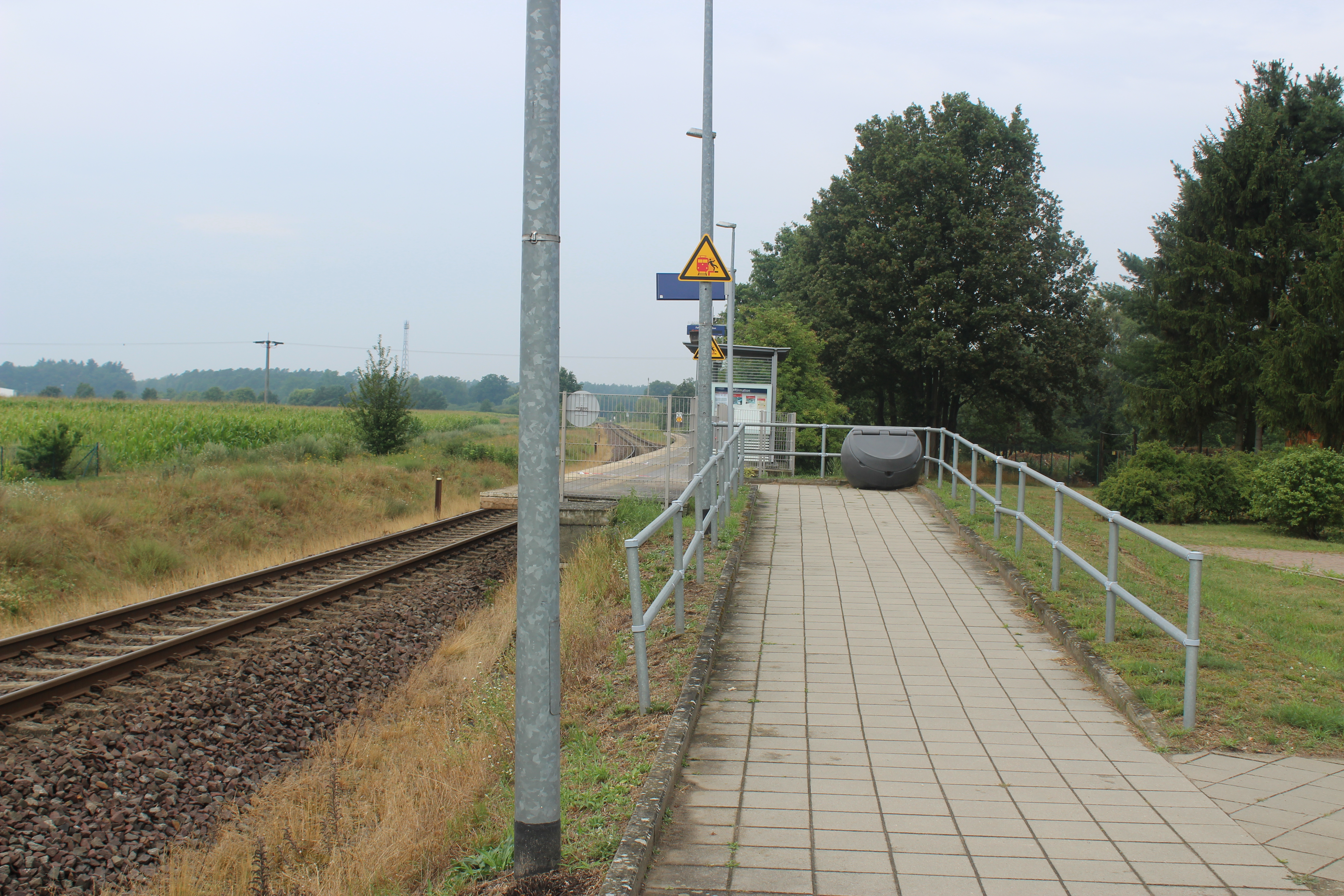
- 2019

General information
- Location: Fretzdorfer Weg/Teezer Straße; 16909 Fretzdorf; Brandenburg; Germany
- Coordinates: 53.065°N 12.546°E
- System: Hp
- Owner: Deutsche Bahn
- Operator: DB Station&Service
- Lines: Kremmen–Meyenburg railway (KBS 206)
- Platforms: 1 side platform
- Tracks: 1
- Train operators: DB Regio Nordost
- Connections: RE 6

Construction
- Parking: yes
- Cycle facilities: yes
- Accessible: yes

Other information
- Station code: 1919
- DS100 code: WFD
- IBNR: 8011572
- Category: 7
- Fare zone: VBB: 4242
- Website: www.bahnhof.de

Services
Preceding station	DB Regio Nordost	Following station
Dossow (Prign) towards Wittenberge	RE 6	Netzeband towards Berlin-Charlottenburg
Location
- Location within Brandenburg Location within Germany Location within Europe

Fretzdorf station (German: Haltepunkt Fretzdorf) is a railway station in the municipality of Fretzdorf, located in the Ostprignitz-Ruppin district in Brandenburg, Germany.
