= Spremberg station =

Railway station in Germany

Spremberg Grodk
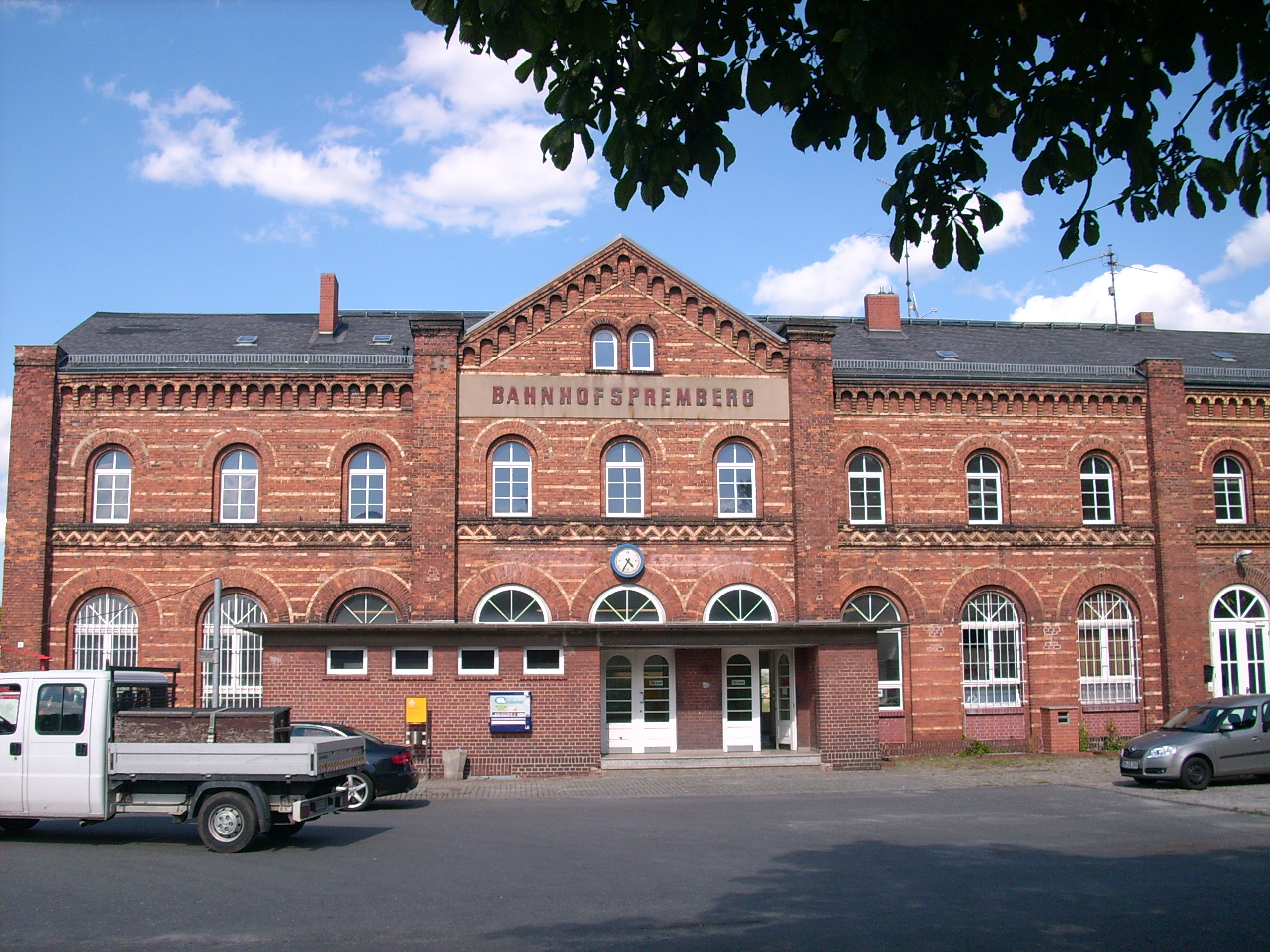
- Station building in 2012

General information
- Location: Bahnhofsvorplatz; 03130 Spremberg; Brandenburg; Germany
- Coordinates: 51.5750°N 14.3970°E
- Elevation: 125 m (410 ft)
- Owner: Deutsche Bahn
- Operator: DB Station&Service
- Lines: Berlin–Görlitz railway (KBS 220)
- Platforms: 2 side platforms
- Tracks: 2
- Train operators: Ostdeutsche Eisenbahn
- Connections: RB 65

Construction
- Parking: yes
- Cycle facilities: yes
- Accessible: yes

Other information
- Station code: 5930
- DS100 code: BSP
- IBNR: 8010330
- Category: 6
- Fare zone: VBB: 7671
- Website: www.bahnhof.de

Services
Preceding station	Ostdeutsche Eisenbahn	Following station
Bagenz towards Cottbus Hbf	RB 65	Schleife towards Zittau
Location
- Location within Brandenburg Location within Germany Location within Europe

Spremberg/Grodk (German: Bahnhof Spremberg; Lower Sorbian: Dwórnišćo Grodk) is a railway station in the municipality of Spremberg, located in the Spree-Neiße district in Brandenburg, Germany.

== Images ==
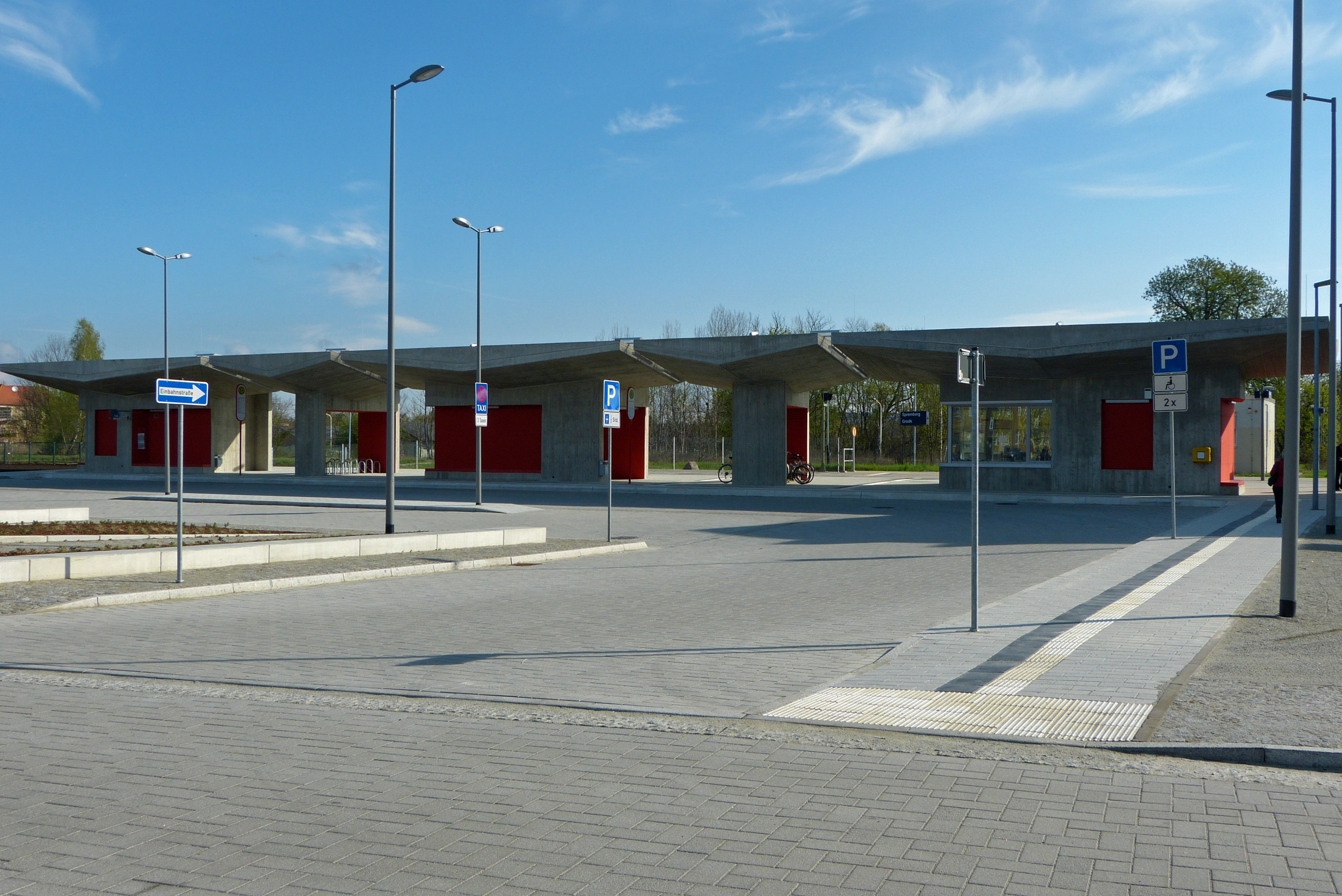
Modern platform area, 2014, on the north end of the station building

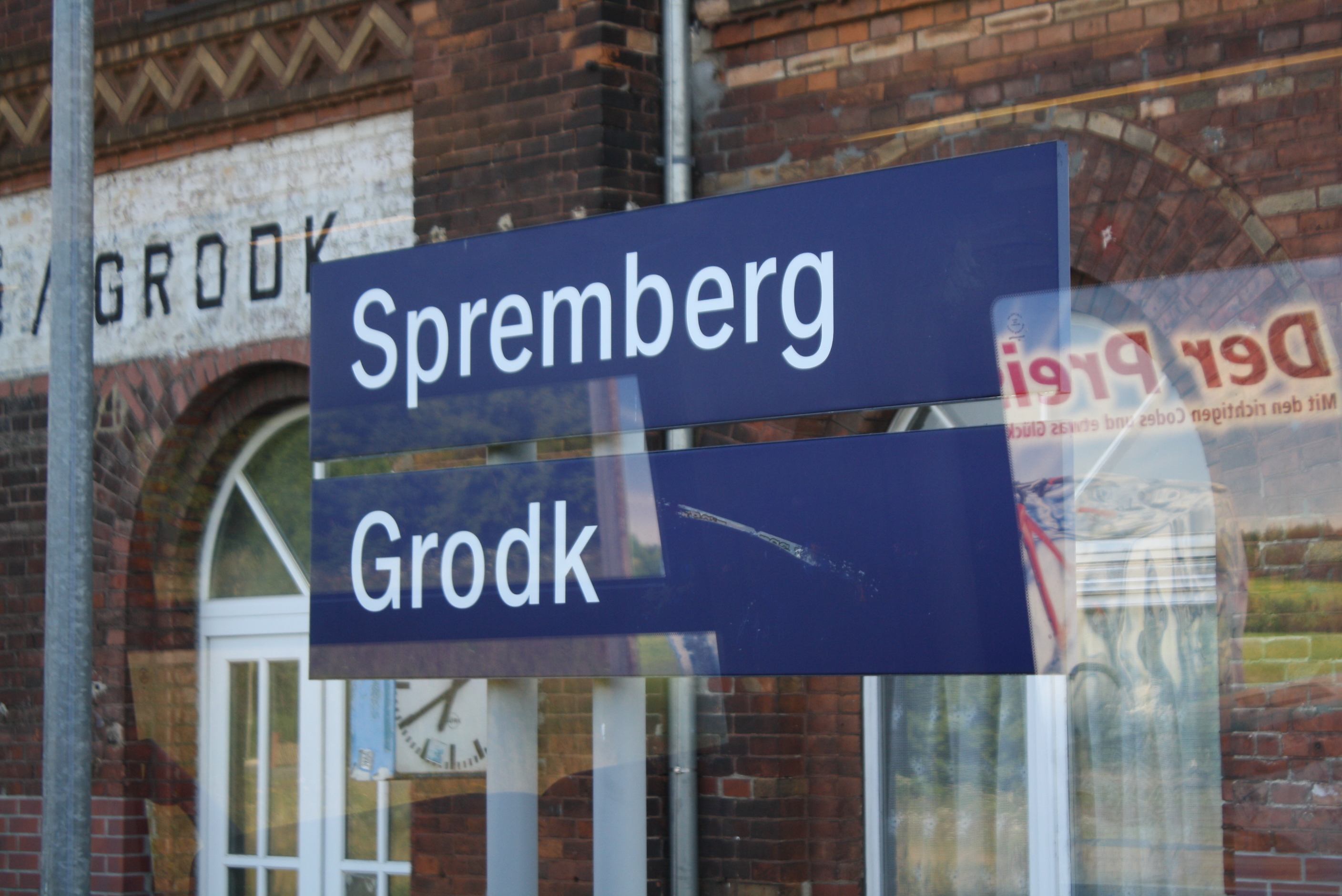
Bilingual sign in German and Lower Sorbian

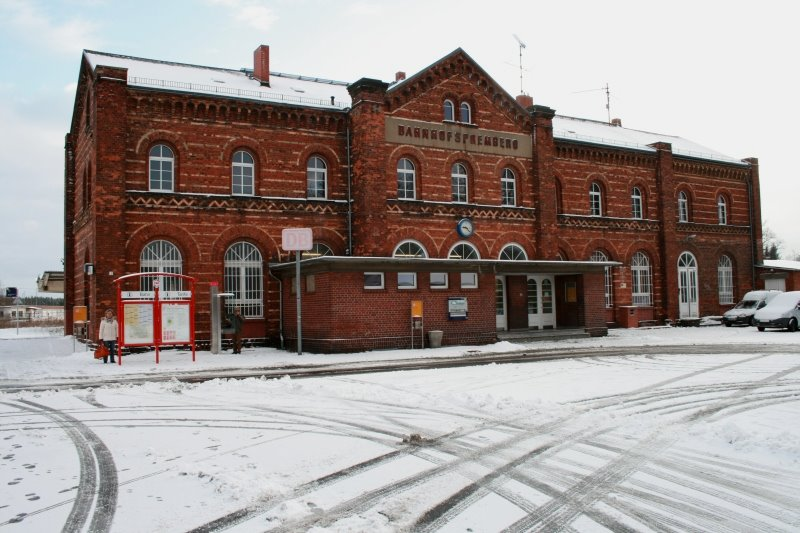
Reception building in snow, 2008
