= DBAG Class 483 =

Rolling stock for the Berlin S-bahn

DBAG Classes 483 & 484
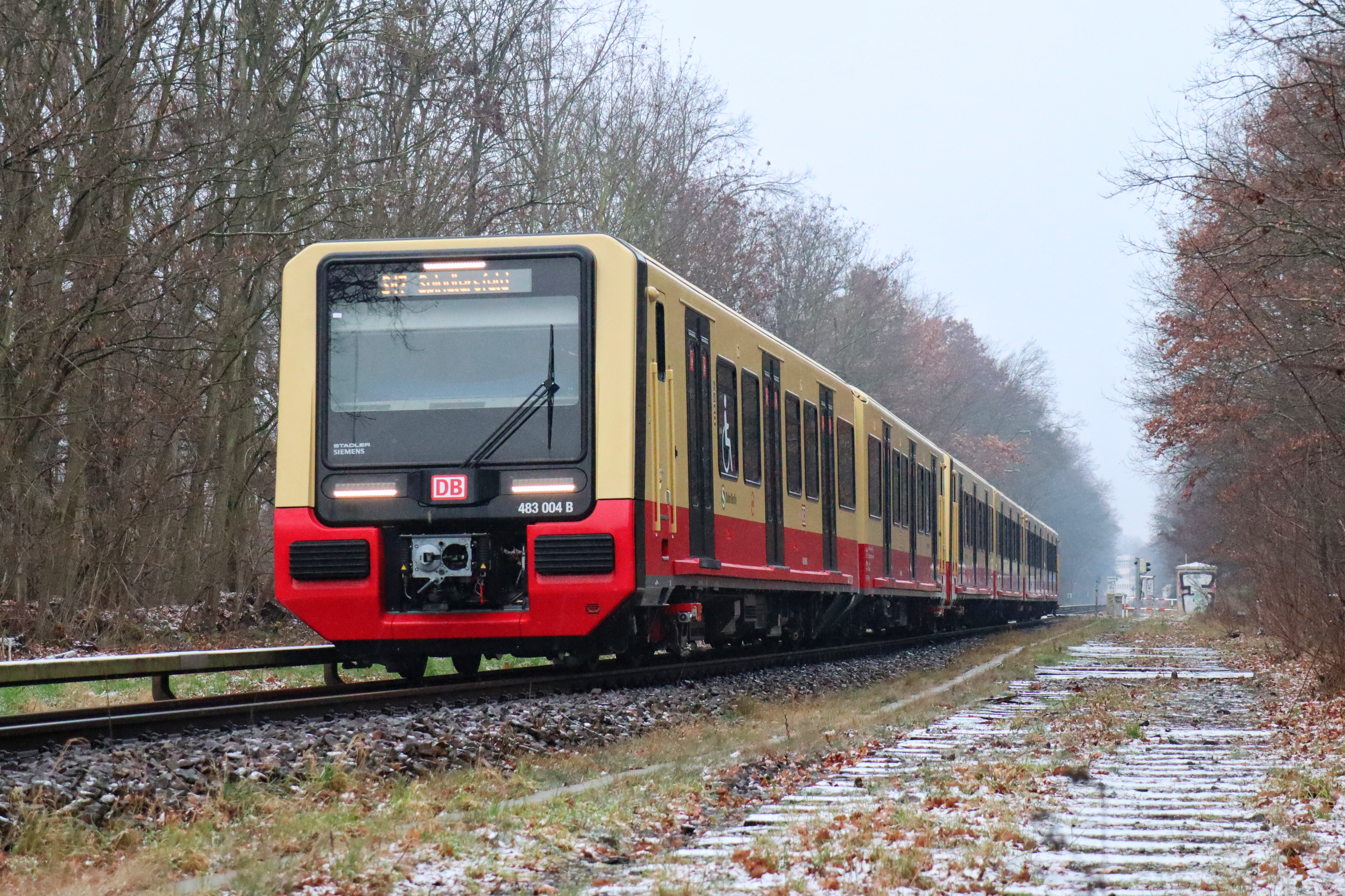
- Class 483 units working a service on the Schöneweide–Spindlersfeld branch line
- In service: 1 January 2021 – present
- Manufacturer: Stadler-Siemens consortium
- Assembly: Stadler Pankow GmbH
- Built at: Szolnok, Hungary (bodyshells); Pankow, Berlin (assembly)
- Constructed: 2020–2023
- Number built: Class 483: 21 units; Class 484: 85 units
- Formation: 2 cars per Class 483 unit; 4 cars per Class 484 unit
- Fleet numbers: 483 001 – 483 021; 484 001 – 484 085
- Capacity: Class 483: 174 (80 seated, 94 standing); Class 484: 386 (184 seated, 202 standing)
- Operators: S-Bahn Berlin GmbH
- Depots: Grünau

Specifications
- Car body construction: Aluminium
- Train length: Class 483: 36.8 m (120 ft 9 in); Class 484: 73.6 m (241 ft 6 in)
- Width: 3.140 m (10 ft 3.6 in)
- Height: 3.600 m (11 ft 9.7 in)
- Floor height: 1.000 m (3 ft 3.4 in)
- Doors: Double-leaf sliding plug, each 1.300 m (4 ft 3.2 in) wide (3 per side per car)
- Wheel diameter: 820 mm (32 in) (new)
- Wheelbase: Bogies: 2.100 m (6 ft 10.7 in)
- Maximum speed: 100 km/h (62 mph)
- Traction motors: asynchronous 3-phase AC (6 or 12 total, 3 per car)
- Power output: Class 483: 840 kW (1,130 hp); Class 484: 1,680 kW (2,250 hp)
- Tractive effort: Starting: 104 kN (23,000 lb_{f})
- Acceleration: Max.: 1.0 m/s^{2} (3.3 ft/s^{2})
- Electric system(s): 750 V DC third rail
- Current collection: Contact shoe
- UIC classification: Class 483: (1A)Bo′+Bo′(A1); Class 484: (1A)Bo′+Bo′(A1)+(1A)Bo′+Bo′(A1)
- Safety system(s): Mechanical train stop; ZBS
- Coupling system: Scharfenberg
- Multiple working: Within class (max. 8 cars)
- Track gauge: 1,435 mm (4 ft 8 1/2 in) standard gauge

Notes/references
- Sourced from except where otherwise noted.

Deutsche Bahn Classes 483 and 484 are related fleets of electric multiple unit (EMU) trains ordered by German railway operator Deutsche Bahn for use on the Berlin S-Bahn system. They are designed and manufactured by a consortium of Stadler Rail and Siemens Mobility. The first units entered public service on 1 January 2021.

== Technical details ==
The full fleet will comprise 21 two-car units of Class 483, referred to as "quarter trains", and 85 four-car units of Class 484, referred to as "half trains". Each unit has a full driver's cab at each end. Units of both classes can work in multiple with each-other, allowing services to be run with trains of two, four, six, or eight cars in total as required.

Stadler, the consortium leader, is responsible for the mechanical and structural aspects of the production process, as part of which the units' aluminium bodyshells are fabricated in Szolnok, Hungary, before being transported by road to the Stadler Pankow works in Berlin for final assembly. Siemens provide the bogies and the electrical subsystems, including the power supply gear, the traction and braking systems, the train control systems, and the passenger information equipment. A significant part of the Siemens contribution is based on the company's work delivering the Oslo Metro MX3000 fleet between 2005 and 2012; the bogies are derived from the lightweight and low-height SF 1000 model used on vehicles for both Oslo and Nuremberg, and the weather-proofing – including the hermetic sealing of much of the power electronics equipment – is especially configured to guard against ice and snow ingress.

The units' traction systems are designed to a high level of redundancy. Each vehicle in each unit is equipped with its own independent traction converter supplying the traction motors that are fitted to three out of the vehicle's four axles. This improves reliability, as on-board drive failures affect only individual vehicles while the rest of the train continues to function. Similarly, although each pair of vehicles shares a single auxiliary-supply converter, each converter has two independent sets of components, so that a failure of one set causes the loss of only half the supply rather than the whole.

In a departure from previous S-Bahn Berlin practice, the vehicles of each unit are identified by letters rather than by individual numbers; thus the vehicles of unit 483 001 are identified as 483 001 A and 483 001 B, and so on. Vehicles of Class 484 units are identified by letters A to D in the same manner.

The new units incorporate a number of new features designed to improve accessibility and comfort. Notably, they are the first trains on the Berlin S-Bahn to have air-conditioning fitted in the passenger saloons; due to height limitations imposed by the network's structure gauge, part of the system is installed under the vehicle floors.

Wheelchair spaces are provided adjacent to each driver's cab, with folding ramps available at the relevant doors. The exterior faces of all passenger doors have been painted black, to better contrast with the ochre-and-red coloured bodysides, and LED strips that illuminate green when the doors are open and red when they're closing are fitted at each door and vestibule. Audible indicators that sound when the doors are opening, and standing open, have been added in addition to the previously-required doors-closing alarm, which has been changed to match the European-standard warning tone used on mainline railways. (Note: An October 2018 article in the Frankfurter Allgemeine Zeitung alleged that the change away from the Berlin S-Bahn's proprietary three-tone warning horn was required by EU regulations, but a representative of the European Commission refuted this in a written response to a parliamentary question on the subject. The Commission opined that compliance with the relevant regulation is "not mandatory" for Berlin S-Bahn vehicles, on the grounds that the stand-alone nature of the Berlin S-Bahn network exempted it from the scope of the regulation.) CCTV is fitted throughout the trains, which can be remotely accessed by the network security centre in the event that an emergency alarm is activated. Open gangways between the vehicles of each unit make it easier for passengers to move through the train, but internal doors are still provided should it be necessary to lock certain vehicles out of use.

In addition to the front and rear destination displays carried by the previous Berlin S-Bahn fleets, the new units are fitted with side-facing displays at regular intervals along the train, and high-resolution internal screens that are capable of showing route diagrams and real-time journey updates.

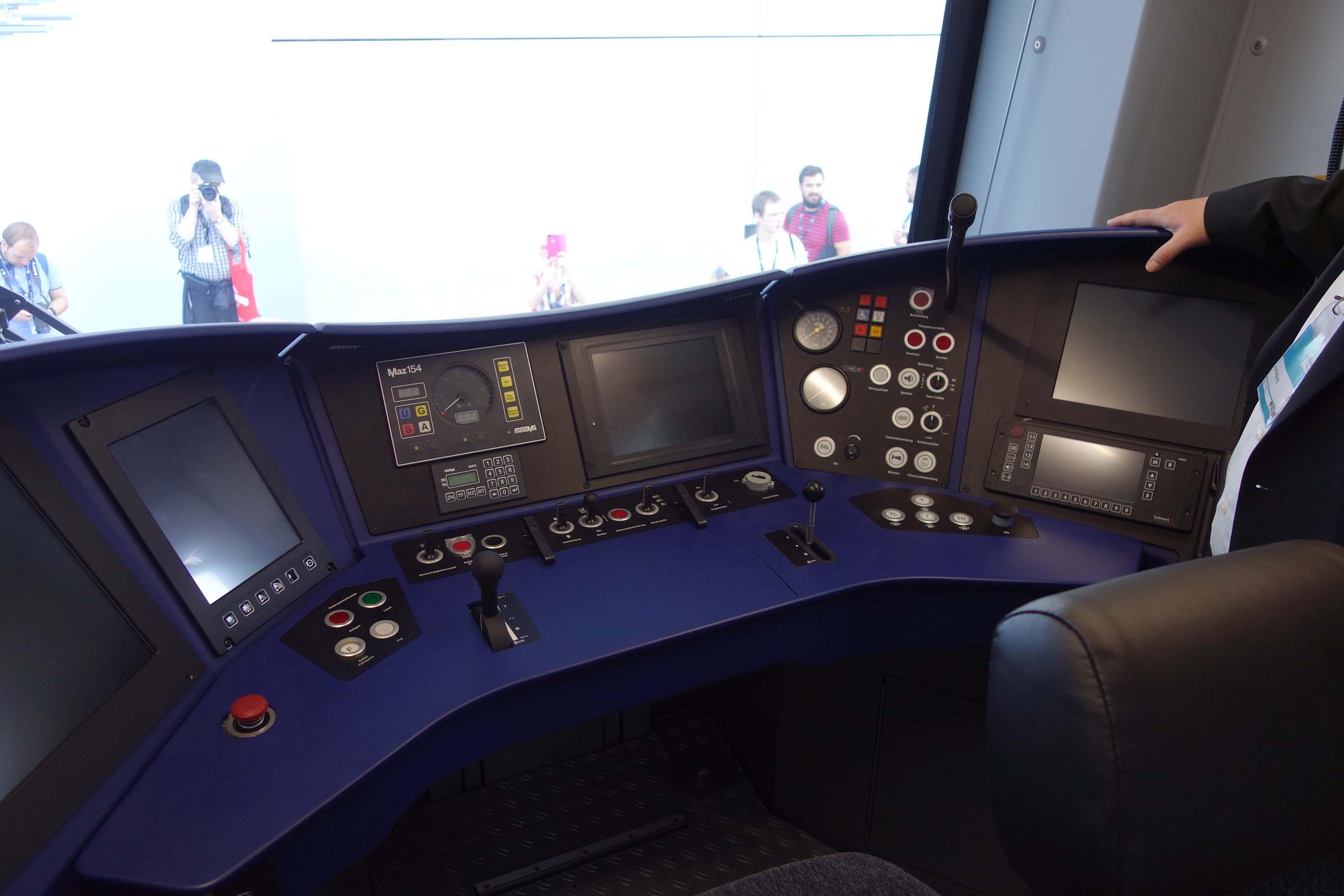
Driver's desk

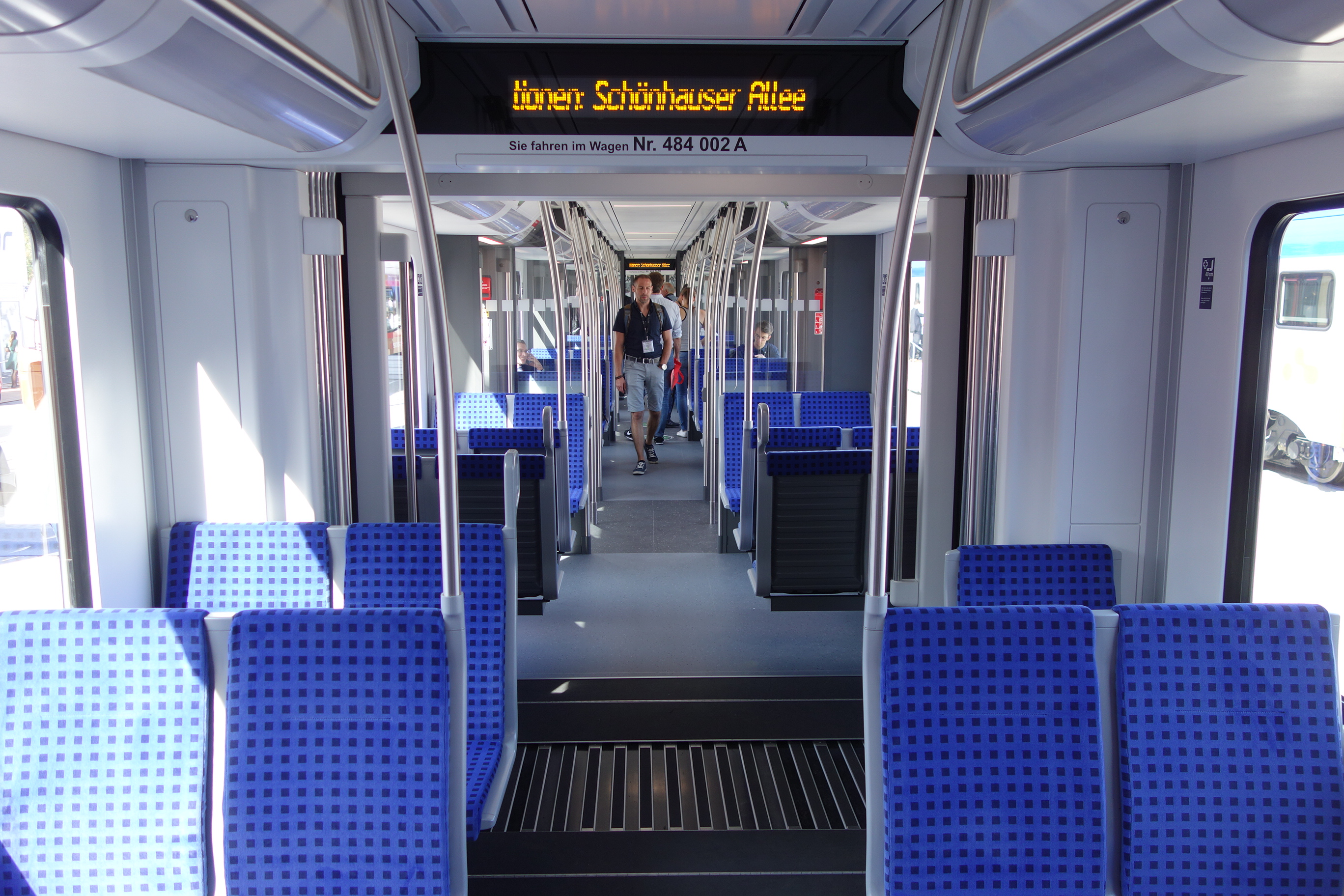
View through open gangway

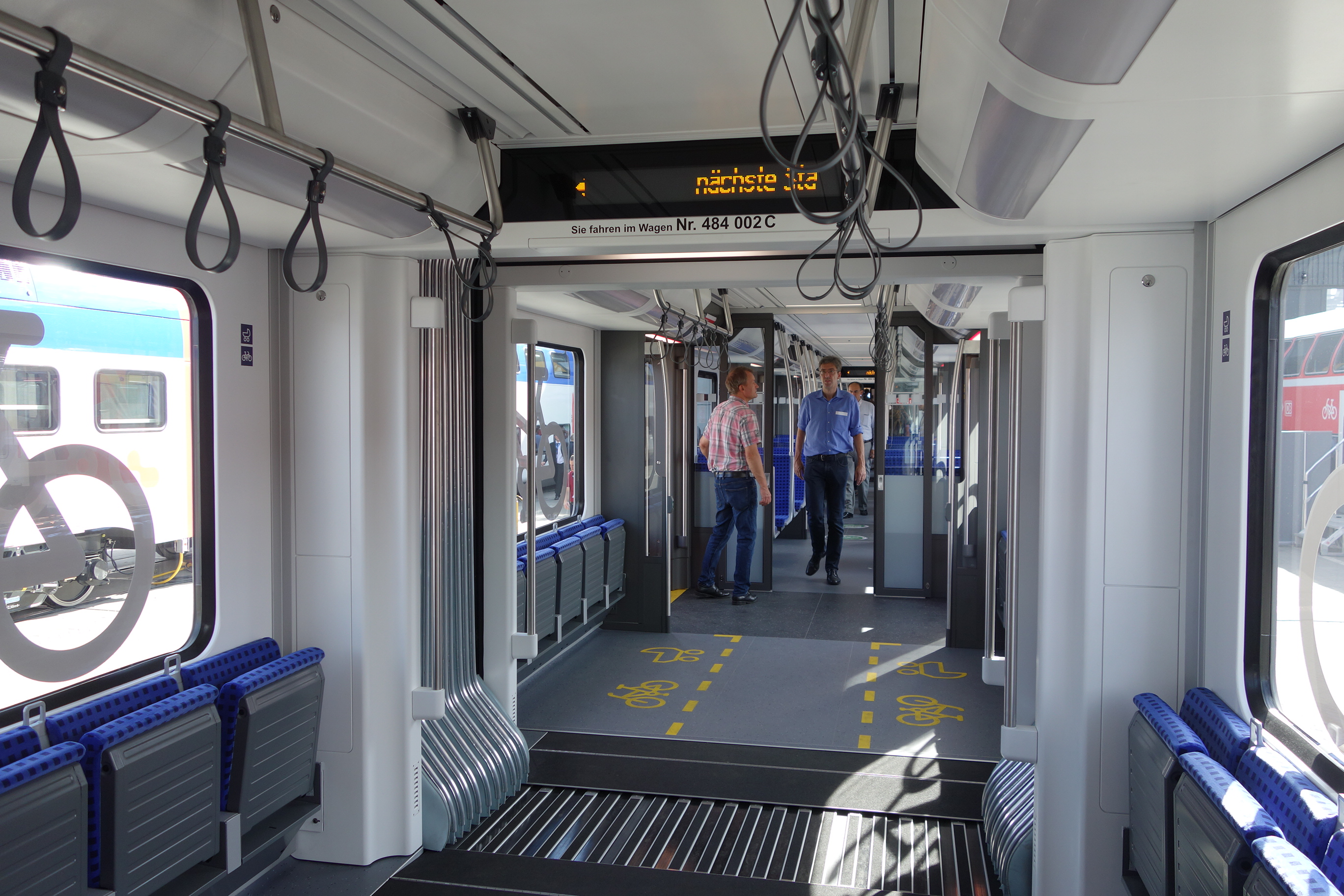
Multipurpose area with tip-up seats

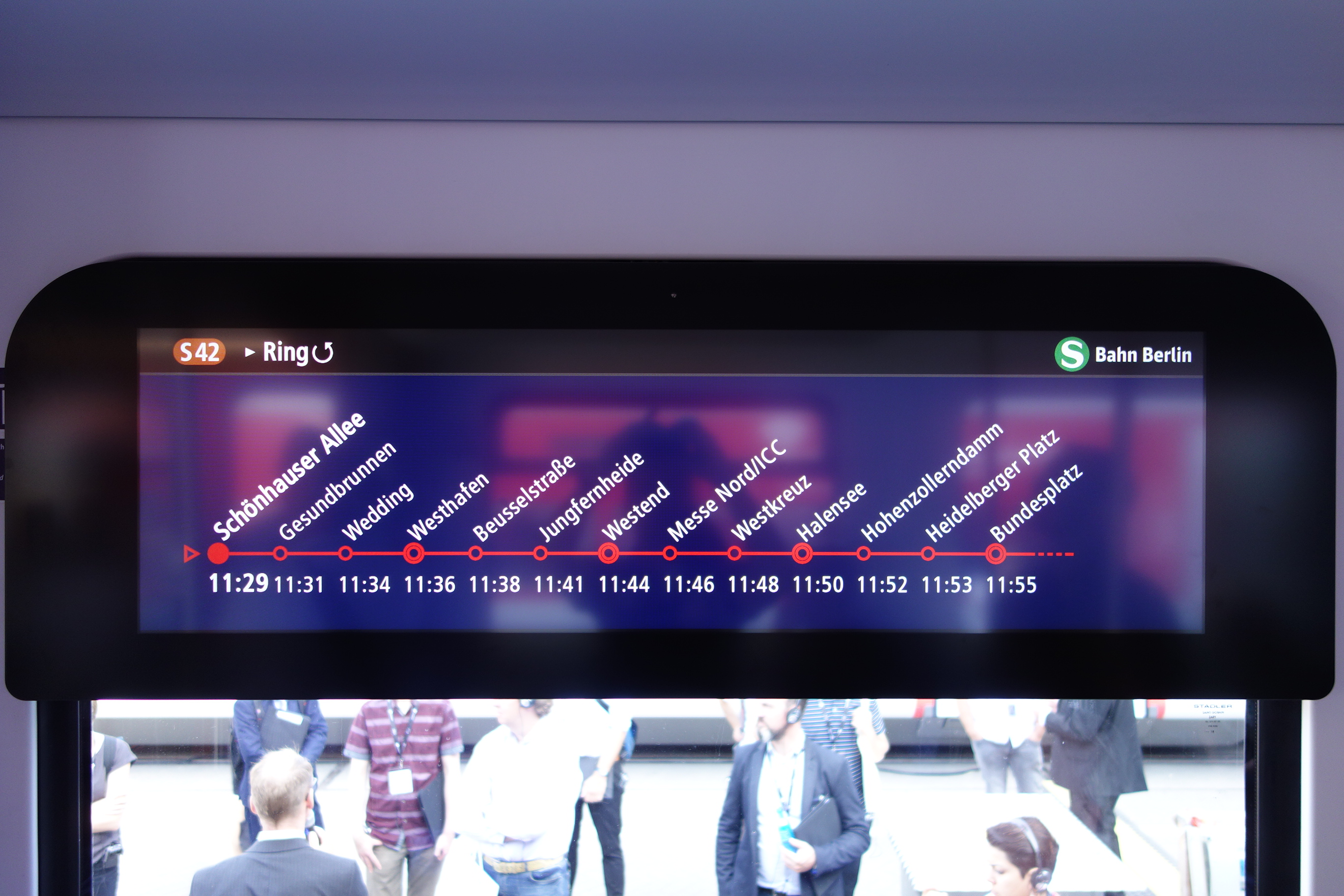
Internal information display

== History ==
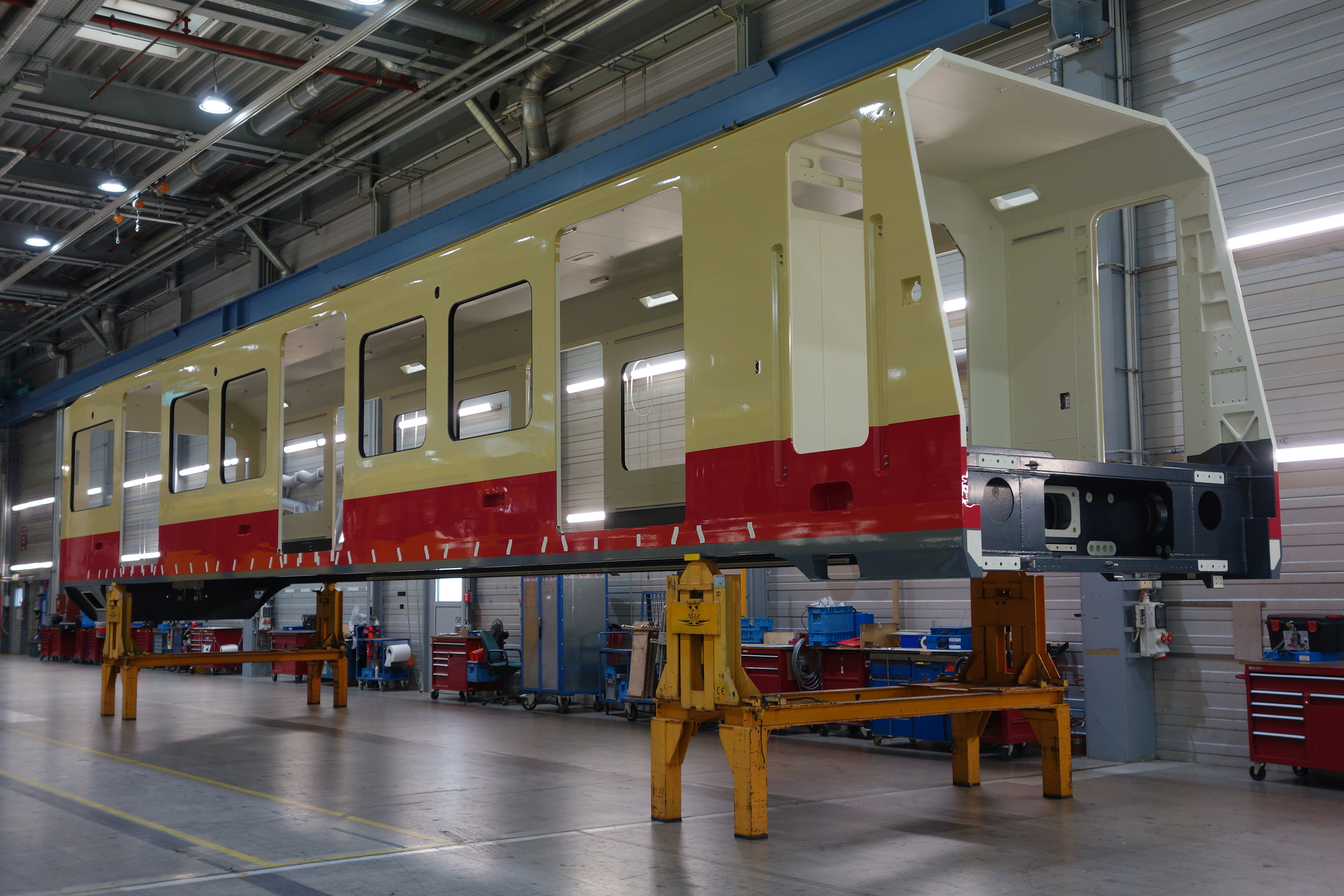
The first carbody after arrival at the Stadler Pankow factory, October 2017

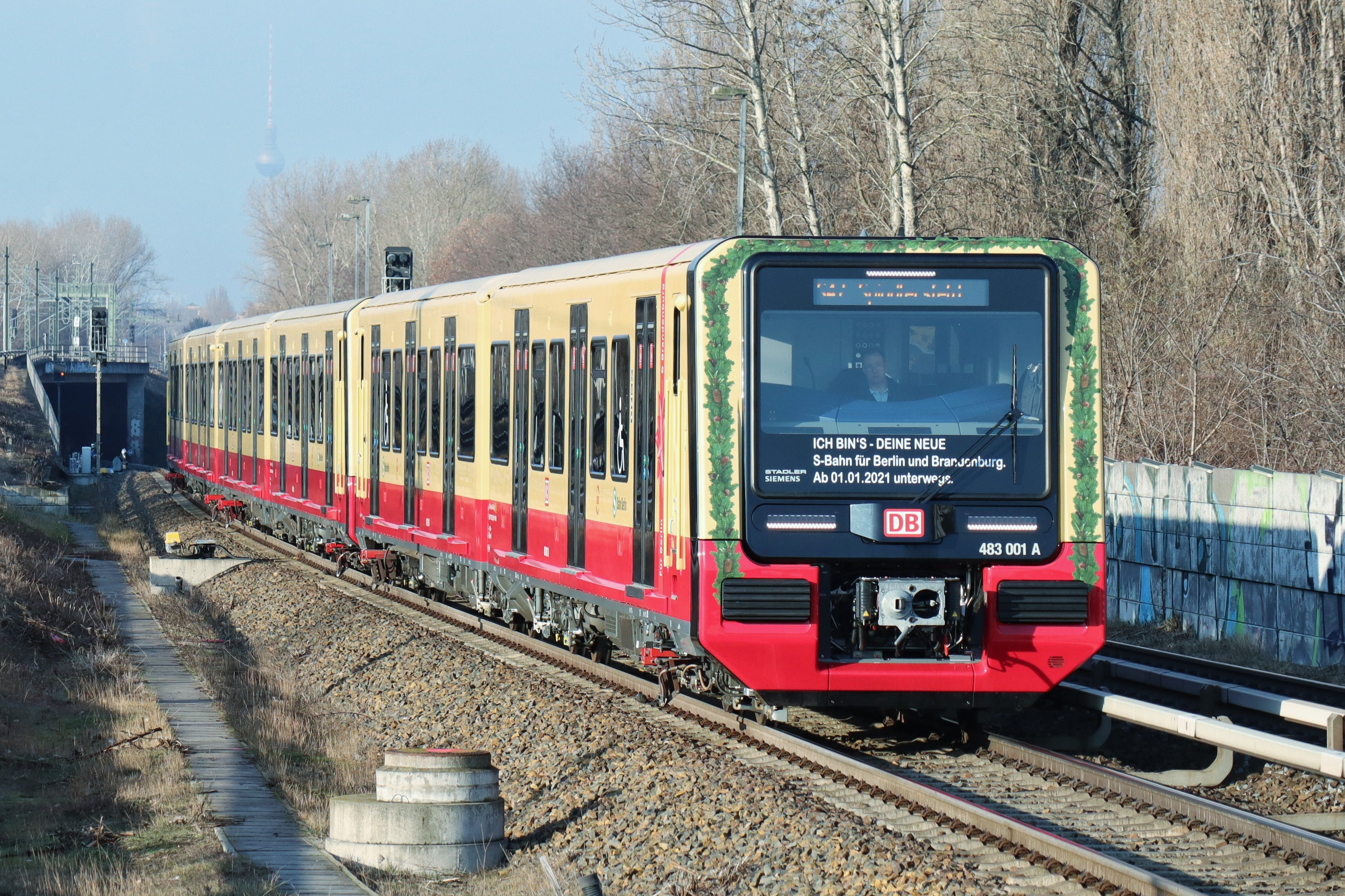
A Class 483+484 consist runs a "welcome train" at Baumschulenweg station, 2 January 2021

DB Regio subsidiary S-Bahn Berlin GmbH awarded a contract for the construction of 85 four-car and 21 two-car trains to the Stadler-Siemens consortium in December 2015. A mock-up of the train was presented in October 2016, and the first completed Class 484 train was rolled out on 27 June 2018.

The trains were tested at Siemens' Wegberg-Wildenrath Test and Validation Centre, with the first of five units to be tested there arriving in late 2018. Trial runs on the Berlin S-Bahn network started in September 2019, out of normal service hours.

The first passenger services with the new trains started on 1 January 2021, on line S47 between Hermannstraße and Spindlersfeld, although these used a subfleet of 10 pre-production units and were technically still considered to be tests. The transition to "regular" service occurred in August 2021 after the pre-production units had satisfactorily demonstrated ongoing availability exceeding 99%.

From December 2021, the new trains also began operating on line S45 to Berlin Brandenburg Airport (although this ended in December 2022). The arrival of additional units allowed operations to expand to line S46 between Westend and Königs Wusterhausen from 27 July 2022, and then onto line S8 between Hohen Neuendorf and Wildau from 14 October 2022.

Operation on the Ring lines S41 and S42, originally scheduled for April–October 2023, instead commenced on 11 December 2022.

In September 2023, it was announced that all trains had entered service.
