= Rathenow station =

Railway station in Rathenow, Germany

Rathenow
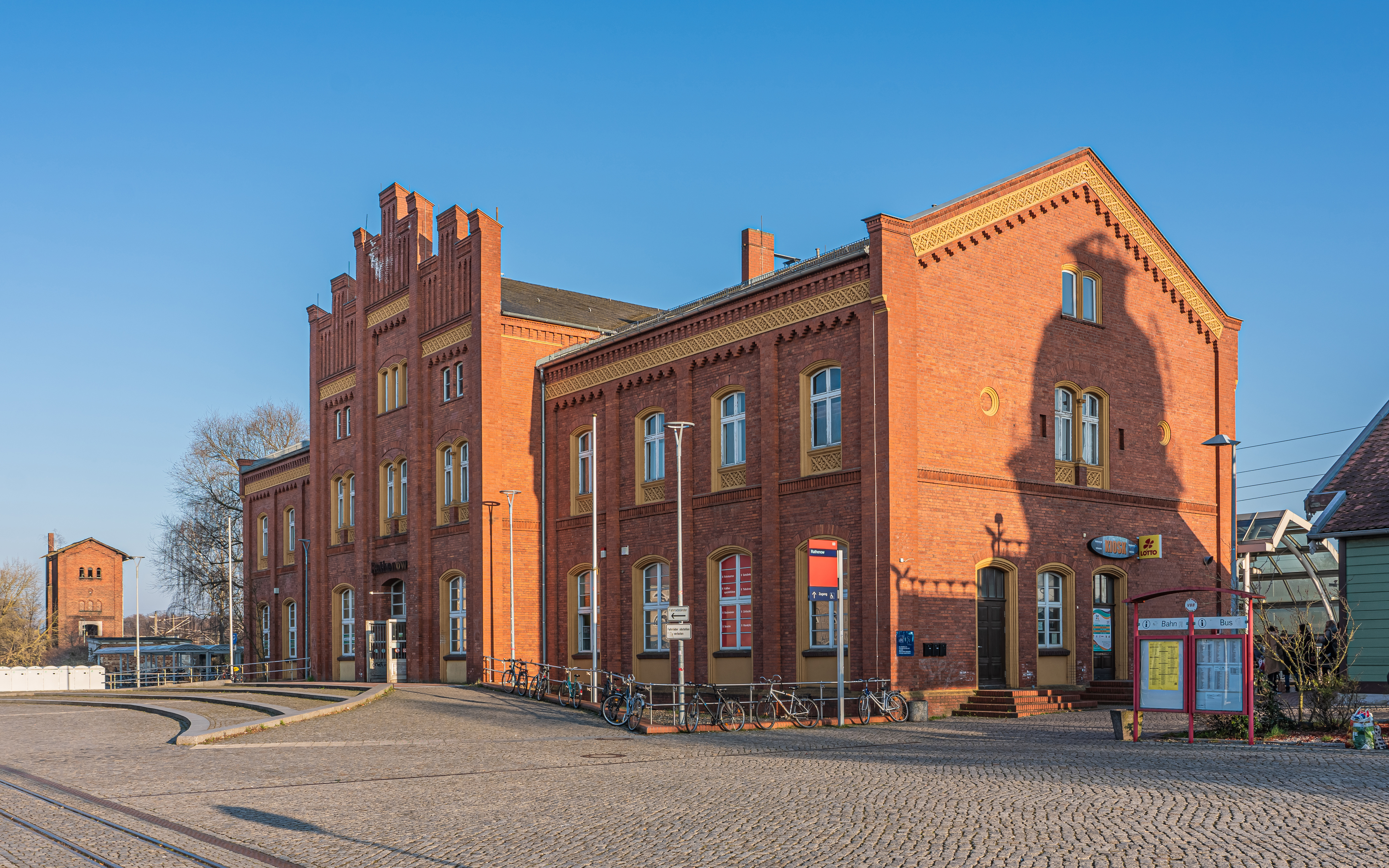
- Rathenow railway station

General information
- Location: Dunkerplatz 21, Rathenow, Brandenburg; Germany
- Coordinates: 52°36′0″N 12°21′17″E
- Lines: Berlin–Lehrte (KBS 202); Brandenburg Towns Railway (KBS 209.51); former Rathenow-Senzke-Nauen District Railway
- Platforms: 4

Construction
- Accessible: Yes

Other information
- Station code: 5131
- DS100 code: LRW
- IBNR: 8010296
- Category: 4
- Fare zone: VBB: 5339
- Website: www.bahnhof.de

History
- Opening: 1870

Services
Preceding station	Hanseatische Eisenbahn	Following station
Großwudicke towards Stendal Hbf	RB 34	Terminus
Preceding station	DB Regio Nordost	Following station
Stendal Hbf Terminus	RE 4	Nennhausen towards Jüterbog or Falkenberg (Elster)
Preceding station	Ostdeutsche Eisenbahn	Following station
Terminus	RB 51	Mögelin towards Brandenburg Hbf
Location

Rathenow (German: Bahnhof Rathenow) is a railway station on the Berlin–Lehrte railway located in Rathenow, in the Havelland, Germany. It is used by about 3,300 passengers daily.

The station consists of the main building, located on the Dunckerplatz ("Duncker place"), later partly renamed as the Bahnhofsvorplatz (“station forecourt”), a disused water tower and the former entrance building for the German Emperor, which now serves as a tourist information office and a bike rental agency. The station also has a platform subway connecting to platform tracks 3 and 4, which are used by the Brandenburg Towns Railway (Brandenburgische Städtebahn), a parking area with 133 spaces and parking for 80 bicycles, 20 of which are covered.

Rathenow station also included a terminus of the former 750 mm gauge Rathenow-Senzke-Nauen District Railway (Kreisbahn Rathenow-Senzke-Nauen). Outside the station there are still remnants of the tracks of the District Railway, which are heritage-listed. The also listed remains of the Brandenburg Towns Railway, including the reception building, are on the south side of the station.

== History ==
Rathenow station was built as part of the construction of the Berlin-Lehrte railway in 1870. The station building was built of Rathenow brick.

The Rathenow Senzke-Nauen District Railway was opened in 1900. With the opening of the Brandenburg Towns Railway in 1904, Rathenow became a small railway junction. All three railway companies operated separate parts of the station: the narrow gauge railway to Nauen ran from the station forecourt and the Brandenburg Towns Railway had its own station building south of the platforms of the Lehrte railway.

The most important line was the Lehrte railway, which carried a large part of the traffic from Berlin to the west. The first major redesign of the station forecourt began in 1936.

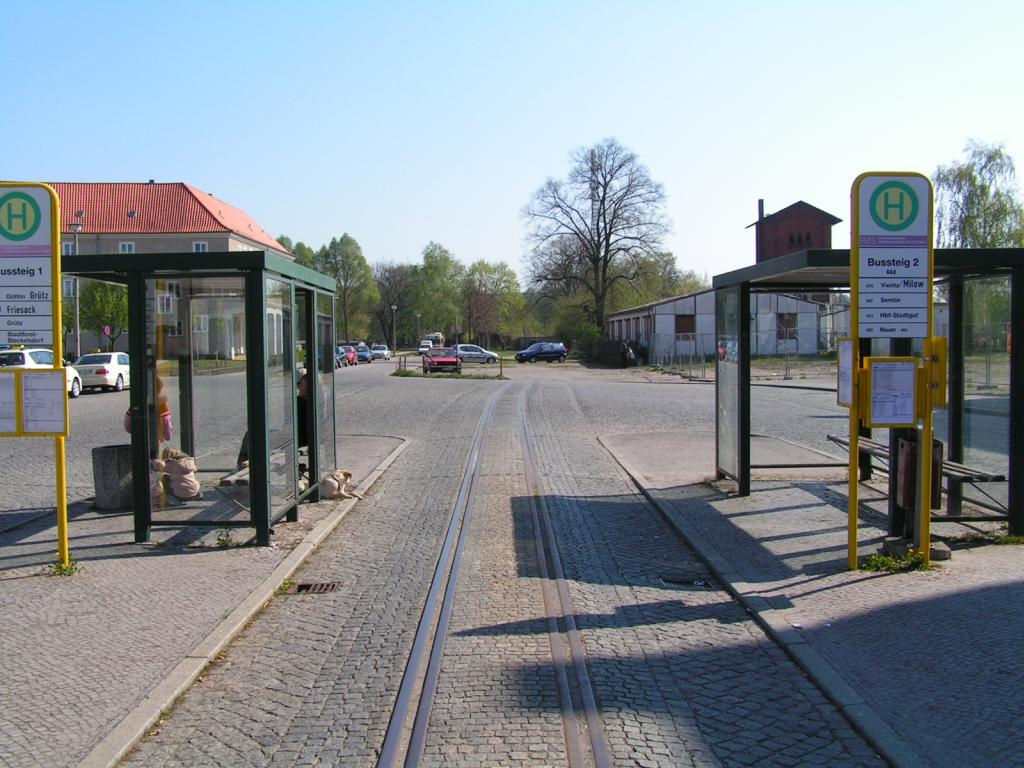
Station forecourt with bus station and remains of the narrow gauge railway

After the Second World War, operations ended on the narrow-gauge railway from Rathenow to Senzke and the section of the track near the station was dismantled. One track of the Lehrte railway was dismantled for reparations. With the division of Germany, the importance of traffic on the line from Berlin to the West Germany via Magdeburg fell.

Even before Die Wende, both German states planned to build a high-speed line between Hanover and Berlin. After German reunification, the project was promoted as a "German Unity Transport Project" (Verkehrsprojekt Deutsche Einheit). As a result, the station was completely rebuilt in the mid-1990s. During the upgrade from 1995 until 1998, the line from Rathenow towards Berlin was completely blockaded and the trains from Stendal were terminated at this time in Rathenow station. A new separate two-track electrified high-speed railway was built. In Rathenow station this meant building the new tracks between the platforms and the station building. The station building gained a glazed extension next to the tracks. The old track was retained on most sections and has since been used for freight and regional services. In the eastern and the western parts of Rathenow station, connecting tracks have been established between the high speed line and the platforms.

The traffic on the section of the Brandenburg Towns Railway between Rathenow Nord (north) and Neustadt (Dosse) was closed on 31 December 2001, but operations continued between Rathenow and Rathenow Nord until 2003.

From 2003 to 2005, the Brandenburg Towns Railway between Rathenow and Brandenburg was completely blockaded and rehabilitated. In 2005 and 2006, parts of the station forecourt were renewed and transformed for the State Garden Show (Landesgartenschau).

== Passenger services ==
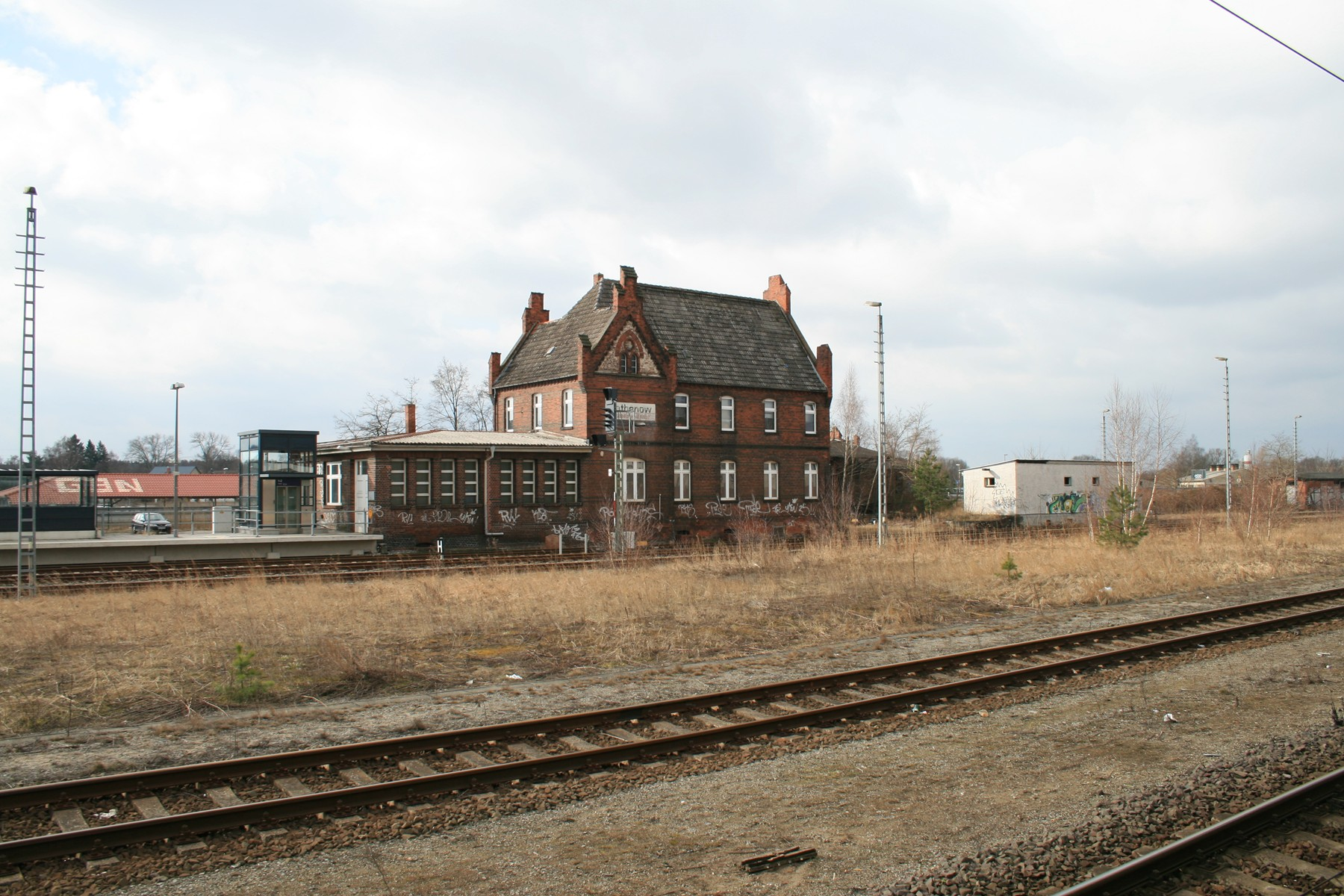
Heritage-listed station building of the Brandenburg Towns Railway

Until the Second World War, the Lehrte railway was an important long-distance connection between Berlin and parts of Germany to the west of Rathenow. Some express trains stopped in Rathenow.

After 1945, the importance of the line for passenger declined significantly as express trains stopped running on it. Until the building of the Berlin Wall in 1961, there were passenger trains from Rathenow to Staaken on the border with West Berlin, where it was possible to change to the Berlin S-Bahn. It was then only possible for trains to reach Rathenow from East Berlin via the Berlin outer ring, with a reversal in Wustermark, and there were only two direct express services a day between Berlin, Rathenow and Stendal.

After 1990, Rathenow had rail services until 1995, when the line was blockaded for the reconstruction of the line. Express trains from Berlin to Amsterdam stopped at the station during this period. After the opening of the high-speed line in 1998, the station was served every two hours from 1998 by an InterRegio service. Direct Regional-Express trains have run directly to Berlin at hourly intervals since then. Stops for long-distance were temporarily resumed in 2008 and 2009, when no regional trains could run to Stendal due to the construction of the new bridge over the Havel.

The station is served by the following service:

- Regional services RE 4 (Stendal –) Rathenow – Wustermark – Berlin – Ludwigsfelde – Jüterbog (– Falkenberg (Elster))
- Local services RB 34 Stendal – Rathenow
- Local services RB 51 Rathenow – Brandenburg
