= Nauen station =

Railway station in Brandenburg, Germany

Nauen
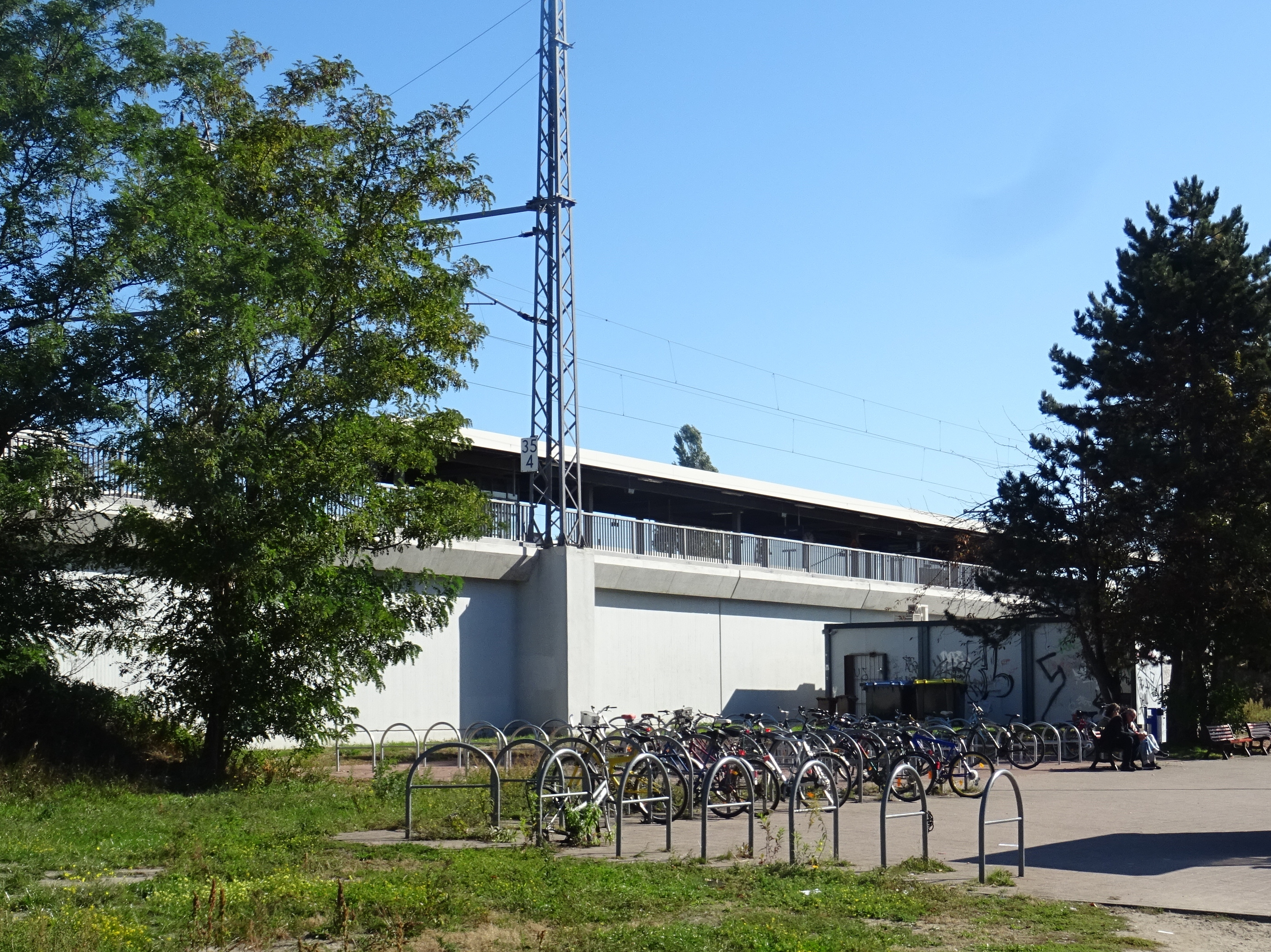
- 2019

General information
- Location: Zum Güterbahnhof; 14641 Nauen; Brandenburg; Germany
- Coordinates: 52°36′45″N 12°53′11″E
- Owner: Deutsche Bahn
- Operator: DB Netz; DB Station&Service
- Lines: Berlin–Hamburg Railway (KBS 209.10/209.14)
- Platforms: 2 island platforms
- Tracks: 7
- Train operators: DB Regio Nordost; Ostdeutsche Eisenbahn

Other information
- Station code: 4306
- DS100 code: BNAU
- IBNR: 8010239
- Category: 3
- Fare zone: VBB: 5347
- Website: www.bahnhof.de

History
- Opened: 15 October 1846; 179 years ago
- Electrified: 28 September 1983; 42 years ago, 15 kV 16 2/3 Hz AC system (overhead)

Services
Preceding station	Ostdeutsche Eisenbahn	Following station
Terminus	RE 2	Falkensee towards Cottbus Hbf
Paulinenaue towards Wismar	RE 8	Falkensee towards Elsterwerda
Terminus	RB 10	Brieselang towards Wünsdorf-Waldstadt
Preceding station	DB Regio Nordost	Following station
Terminus	RB 14	Brieselang towards Berlin Ostbahnhof
Location
- Location within Brandenburg Location within Germany Location within Europe

Nauen station (German: Bahnhof Nauen) is a railway station located in the town of Nauen, Brandenburg, Germany. The station lies on the Berlin–Hamburg railway and the train services are operated by Deutsche Bahn and Ostdeutsche Eisenbahn.

The station was served by the following services in 2026:

- RE 2: Nauen – Berlin-Spandau – Berlin Zoologischer Garten – Berlin – Berlin Ostbahnhof – Königs Wusterhausen – Lübben (Spreewald) – Cottbus
- RE 8: Wismar – Schwerin – Ludwigslust – Wittenberge – Nauen – Berlin – Potsdamer Platz – Südkreuz –Wünsdorf-Waldstadt – Elsterwerda
- RB 10: Nauen – Falkensee – Berlin – Südkreuz – Rangsdorf
- RB 14: Nauen – Falkensee – Berlin – Berlin Ostbahnhof
