= Miltzow station =

Railway station in Germany

Miltzow

General information
- Location: Miltzow, MV, Germany
- Coordinates: 54°11′57″N 13°12′05″E
- Line: Angermünde–Stralsund railway
- Platforms: 2
- Tracks: 4

Construction
- Accessible: Yes

Other information
- Station code: 4115
- DS100 code: WMI
- IBNR: 8012358
- Category: 6
- Website: www.bahnhof.de

History
- Opened: 1 November 1863; 162 years ago
- Electrified: 17 December 1988; 37 years ago

Services
Preceding station	DB Regio Nordost	Following station
Stralsund Hbf Terminus	RE 3	Greifswald towards Jüterbog or Lutherstadt Wittenberg Hbf
Stralsund Hbf Terminus	RE 7	Greifswald Terminus
Stralsund Hbf Terminus	RE 30	Greifswald towards Angermünde
Location

Miltzow (German: Bahnhof Miltzow) is a railway station in the village of Miltzow and close to the town of Reinkenhagen, Mecklenburg-Vorpommern, Germany. The station lies of the Angermünde–Stralsund railway and the train services are operated by Deutsche Bahn.

In the 2026 timetable the following lines stop at the station:

Line	Route	Frequency
RE 3	Stralsund – Miltzow – Greifswald – Züssow – Pasewalk – Angermünde – Erberswalde – Berlin-Gesundbrunnen – Berlin Hbf – Berlin Südkreuz – Ludwigsfelde – Luckenwalde – Jüterbog – Falkenberg	every 2 hours
RE 7	Stralsund – Miltzow – Greifswald	every 2 hours during peak times
RE 30	Stralsund – Miltzow – Greifswald – Pasewalk – Prenzlau – Angermünde	every 2 hours
