= Klein Bünzow station =

Railway station in Germany

Klein Bünzow

General information
- Location: Klein Bünzow, MV, Germany
- Coordinates: 53°55′30″N 13°37′12″E
- Line: Angermünde–Stralsund railway
- Platforms: 2
- Tracks: 2

Construction
- Accessible: Yes

Other information
- Station code: 3228
- DS100 code: WKB
- IBNR: 8011244
- Category: 7
- Website: www.bahnhof.de

History
- Opened: 1902
- Electrified: 23 September 1988; 37 years ago

Services
Preceding station	DB Regio Nordost	Following station
Züssow towards Stralsund Hbf	RE 3	Anklam towards Jüterbog or Lutherstadt Wittenberg Hbf
Züssow towards Stralsund Hbf	RE 30	Anklam towards Angermünde
Location
- Location within Mecklenburg-Vorpommern Location within Germany Location within Europe

Klein Bünzow (German: Bahnhof Klein Bünzow) is a railway station in the village of Klein Bünzow, Mecklenburg-Vorpommern, Germany. The station lies of the Angermünde–Stralsund railway and the train services are operated by Deutsche Bahn and Ostdeutsche Eisenbahn.

In the 2026 timetable the following lines stop at the station:

Line	Route	Frequency
RE 3	Stralsund – Greifswald – Klein Bünzow – Angermünde – Eberswalde – Berlin – Ludwigsfelde – Jüterbog	120 min
RE 30	Stralsund – Greifswald – Klein Bünzow – Pasewalk – Prenzlau – Angermünde	120 min
