= Groß Kiesow station =

Railway station in Germany

Groß Kiesow

General information
- Location: Groß Kiesow, MV, Germany
- Coordinates: 54°00′48″N 13°28′50″E
- Line: Angermünde–Stralsund railway
- Platforms: 2
- Tracks: 2

Construction
- Accessible: Yes

Other information
- Website: www.bahnhof.de

History
- Opened: 1894
- Electrified: 9 December 1988; 37 years ago

Services
Preceding station	DB Regio Nordost	Following station
Greifswald Süd towards Stralsund Hbf	RE 3	Züssow towards Jüterbog or Lutherstadt Wittenberg Hbf
Greifswald Süd towards Stralsund Hbf	RE 30	Züssow towards Angermünde
Location

Groß Kiesow (German: Bahnhof Groß Kiesow) is a railway station in the town of Groß Kiesow, Mecklenburg-Vorpommern, Germany. The station lies of the Angermünde–Stralsund railway and the train services are operated by Deutsche Bahn and Ostdeutsche Eisenbahn.

In the 2026 timetable the following lines stop at the station:

Line	Route	Frequency
RE 3	Stralsund – Greifswald – Groß Kiesow – Angermünde – Eberswalde – Berlin – Ludwigsfelde – Jüterbog	120 min
RE 30	Stralsund – Greifswald – Groß Kiesow – Pasewalk – Prenzlau – Angermünde	120 min
