= Greifswald Süd station =

Railway station in Germany

Greifswald Süd
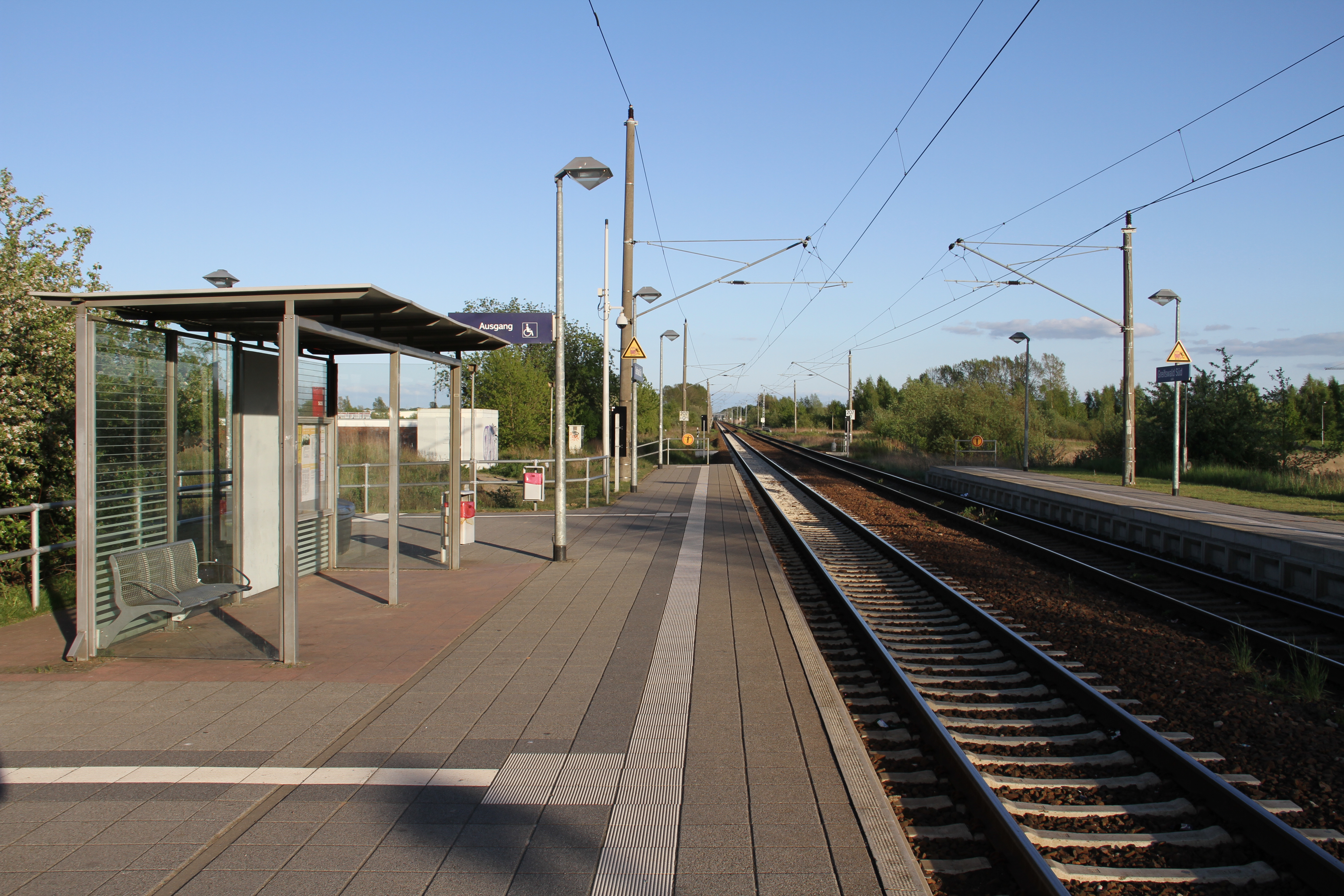

General information
- Location: Greifswald, MV, Germany
- Coordinates: 54°04′34″N 13°23′49″E
- Owner: Deutsche Bahn
- Operator: DB Station&Service
- Line: Angermünde–Stralsund railway
- Platforms: 2 side platforms
- Tracks: 2

Construction
- Accessible: Yes

Other information
- Station code: 2253
- DS100 code: WGWS
- Category: 6
- Website: www.bahnhof.de

History
- Opened: 1 June 1970; 56 years ago
- Electrified: 9 December 1988; 37 years ago

Services
Preceding station	DB Regio Nordost	Following station
Greifswald towards Stralsund Hbf	RE 3	Groß Kiesow towards Jüterbog or Lutherstadt Wittenberg Hbf
Greifswald towards Stralsund Hbf	RE 30	Groß Kiesow towards Angermünde
Location

Greifswald Süd (German: Bahnhof Greifswald Süd) is a railway station in the town of Greifswald, Mecklenburg-Vorpommern, Germany. The station lies of the Angermünde–Stralsund railway and the train services are operated by DB Regio Nordost.

In the 2026 timetable the following lines stop at the station:

Line	Route	Frequency
RE 3	Stralsund – Greifswald – Greifswald Süd – Angermünde – Eberswalde – Berlin – Ludwigsfelde – Jüterbog	120 min
RE 30	Stralsund – Greifswald – Greifswald Süd – Pasewalk – Prenzlau – Angermünde	120 min

'
