= Anklam station =

Railway station in Germany

Anklam
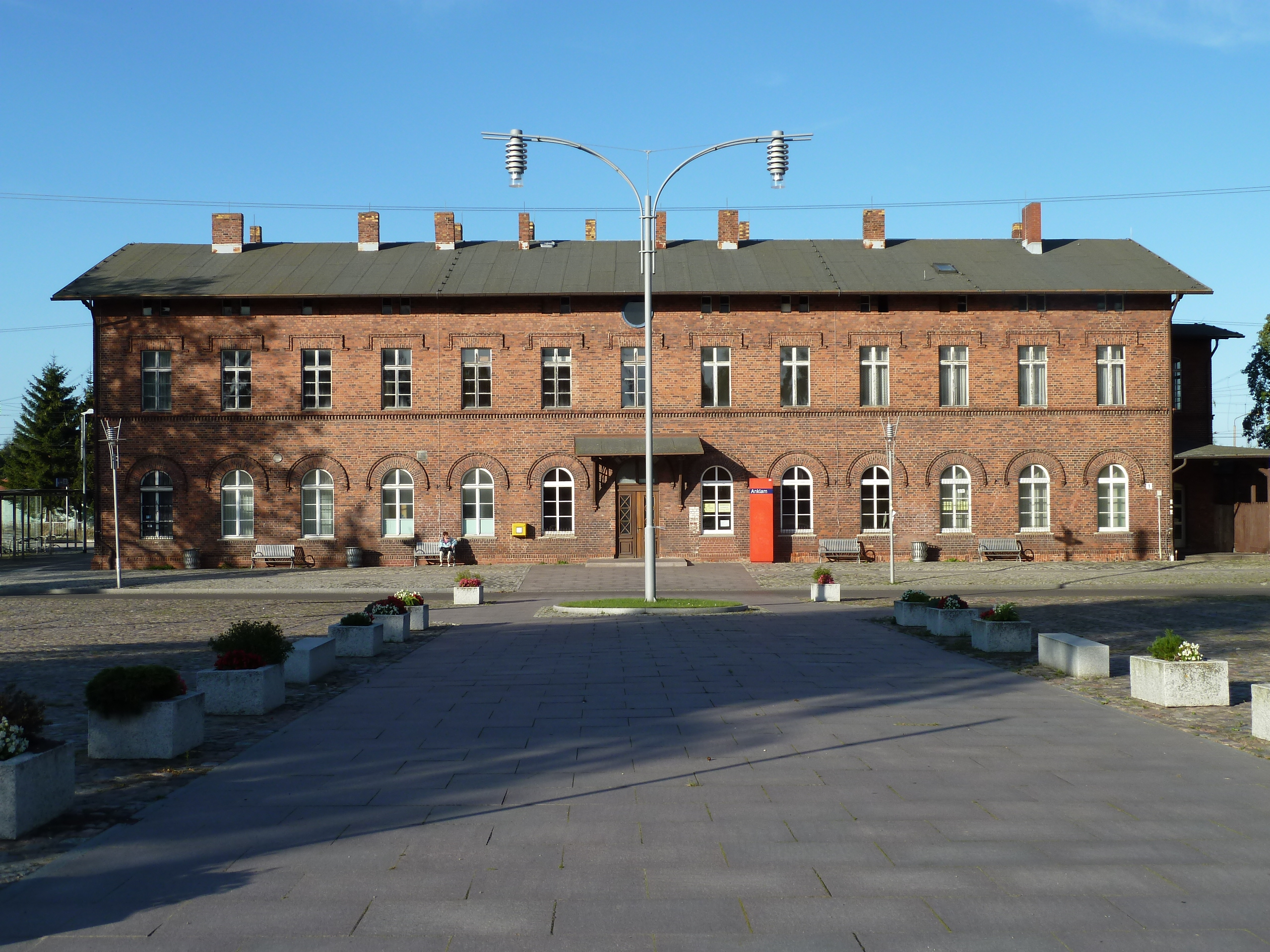
- Anklam railway station

General information
- Location: Anklam, Mecklenburg-Vorpommern, Germany
- Coordinates: 53°51′21″N 13°42′05″E
- Owner: Deutsche Bahn
- Operator: DB Station&Service
- Line: Angermünde–Stralsund railway
- Platforms: 2
- Tracks: 4

Construction
- Accessible: Yes

Other information
- Website: www.bahnhof.de

History
- Opened: 16 March 1863; 163 years ago
- Electrified: 23 September 1988; 37 years ago

Services
Preceding station	DB Fernverkehr	Following station
Züssow towards Ostseebad Binz	ICE 15	Pasewalk towards Saarbrücken Hbf
Preceding station	DB Regio Nordost	Following station
Klein Bünzow towards Stralsund Hbf	RE 3	Ducherow towards Jüterbog or Lutherstadt Wittenberg Hbf
Klein Bünzow towards Stralsund Hbf	RE 30	Ducherow towards Angermünde
Location
- Location within Mecklenburg-Vorpommern Location within Germany Location within Europe

Anklam (German: Bahnhof Anklam) is a railway station in the town of Anklam, Mecklenburg-Vorpommern, Germany. The station lies on the Angermünde–Stralsund railway and the train services are operated by Deutsche Bahn Ostdeutsche Eisenbahn.

== Train services ==
In the 2026 timetable the following lines stop at the station:

Line	Route	Frequency
ICE 15	Binz – Stralsund – Anklam – Berlin – Halle – Erfurt – Frankfurt – Darmstadt – Mannheim – Kaiserslautern – Saarbrücken	Four times a day
RE 3	Stralsund – Greifswald – Anklam – Angermünde – Eberswalde – Berlin – Ludwigsfelde – Jüterbog – Falkenberg (Elster)	120 min
RE 30	Stralsund – Greifswald – Anklam – Pasewalk – Prenzlau – Angermünde	120 min
