= Seehausen (Uckermark) station =

Railway station in Brandenburg, Germany

Seehausen (Uckermark)

General information
- Location: Seehausen, Brandenburg, Germany
- Coordinates: 53°13′15″N 13°53′05″E
- Line: Angermünde–Stralsund railway
- Platforms: 2
- Tracks: 2

Other information
- Fare zone: VBB: 3963

History
- Opened: 16 March 1863

Services
| Preceding station | DB Regio Nordost | Following station |
|---|---|---|
| Prenzlau towards Stralsund Hbf | RE 3 | Warnitz (Uckermark) towards Jüterbog or Lutherstadt Wittenberg Hbf |
Location
- Location within Brandenburg Location within Germany Location within Europe

Seehausen (Uckermark) (German: Bahnhof Seehausen (Uckermark)) is a railway station in the village of Seehausen, municipality Oberuckersee, Brandenburg, Germany. The station lies of the Angermünde–Stralsund railway and the train services are operated by Deutsche Bahn.

== Train services ==
The station is served by the following service(s):

- Regional services RE 3 Stralsund - Greifswald - Pasewalk - Angermünde - Berlin - Ludwigsfelde - Jüterbog - Falkenberg - Elsterwerda
