= Nechlin station =

Railway station in Brandenburg, Germany

Nechlin

General information
- Location: Nechlin, Brandenburg, Germany
- Coordinates: 53°26′30″N 13°54′12″E
- Owner: Deutsche Bahn
- Operator: DB Station&Service
- Line: Angermünde–Stralsund railway
- Platforms: 2
- Tracks: 2

Other information
- Fare zone: VBB: 3563
- Website: www.bahnhof.de

History
- Opened: 16 March 1863

Services
Preceding station	DB Regio Nordost	Following station
Pasewalk towards Stralsund Hbf	RE 3	Prenzlau towards Jüterbog or Lutherstadt Wittenberg Hbf
Location
- Location within Brandenburg Location within Germany Location within Europe

Nechlin (German: Haltepunkt Nechlin) is a railway station in the village of Nechlin, Brandenburg, Germany. The station lies of the Angermünde–Stralsund railway and the train services are operated by Deutsche Bahn.

== Train services ==
The station is served by the following service(s):

- Regional services RE 3 Stralsund - Greifswald - Pasewalk - Angermünde - Berlin - Ludwigsfelde - Jüterbog - Falkenberg - Elsterwerda
