= Groß Kiesow =

- Municipality
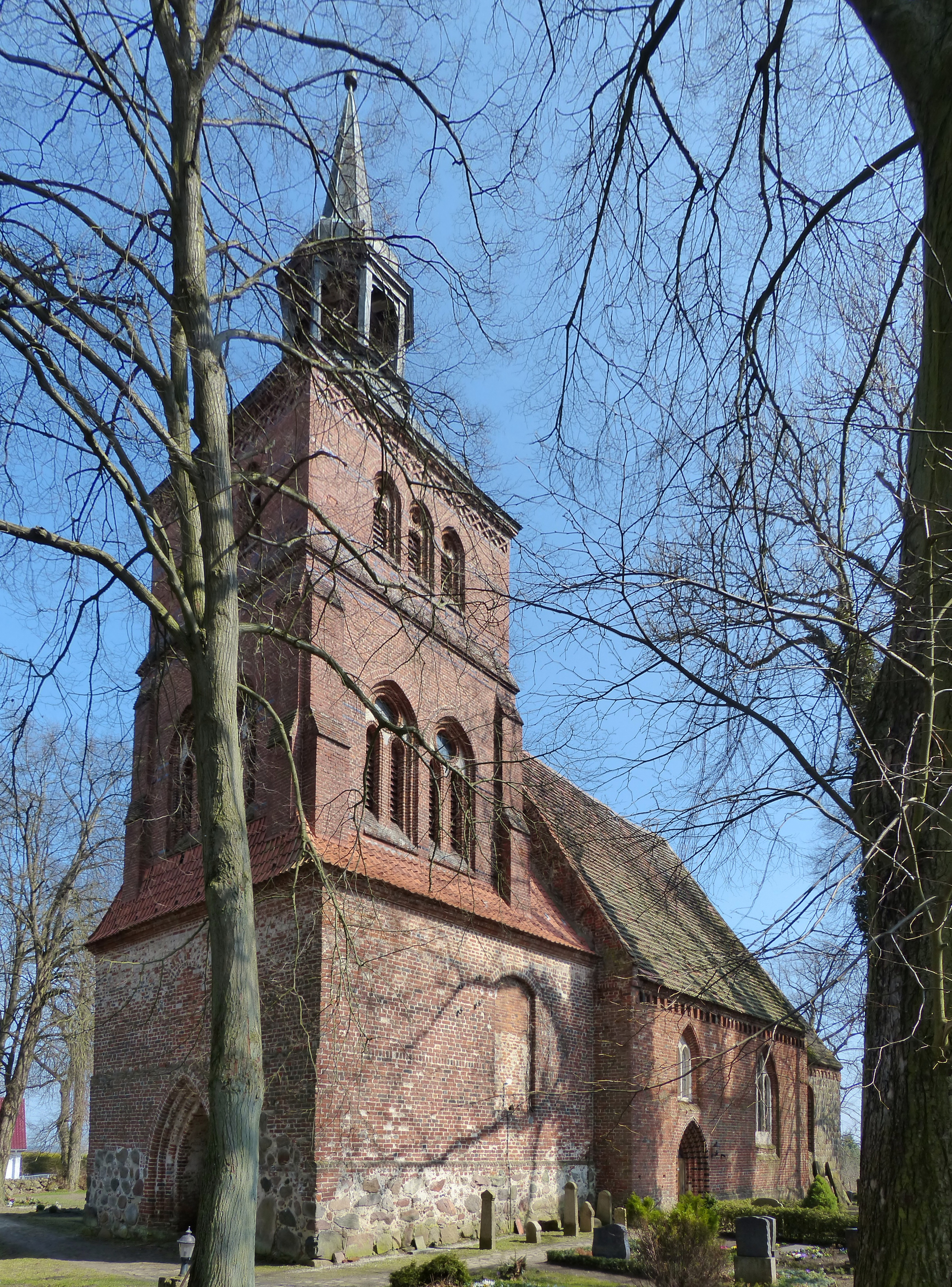
- Medieval church in Groß Kiesow

- Location of Groß Kiesow within Vorpommern-Greifswald district
- Interactive map of Groß Kiesow
- Location within Germany Location within Mecklenburg-Vorpommern
- Coordinates: 54°01′N 13°27′E
- Country: Germany
- State: Mecklenburg-Vorpommern
- District: Vorpommern-Greifswald
- Municipal assoc.: Züssow
- Subdivisions: 11 Ortsteile

Government
  - Mayor: Astrid Zschiesche

Area
  - Total: 47.65 km^{2} (18.40 sq mi)
- Elevation: 26 m (85 ft)

Population (2025-12-31)
  - Total: 1,212
  - Density: 25.44/km^{2} (65.88/sq mi)
- Time zone: UTC+01:00 (CET)
  - Summer (DST): UTC+02:00 (CEST)
- Postal codes: 17495
- Dialling codes: 038356
- Vehicle registration: VG

Groß Kiesow is a municipality in the Vorpommern-Greifswald district, in Mecklenburg-Vorpommern, Germany. It consists of

- Dambeck
- Groß Kiesow
- Groß Kiesow-Meierei
- Kessin
- Klein Kiesow
- Klein Kiesow-Kolonie
- Krebsow
- Sanz (Hof I, III, IV, V, VI, VII)
- Schlagtow
- Schlagtow-Meierei
- Strellin

== Transport ==
Groß Kiesow railway station connects Groß Kiesow with Stralsund, Greifswald, Züssow, Usedom, Angermünde, Eberswalde and Berlin.
