= Züssow station =

Railway station in Germany

Züssow
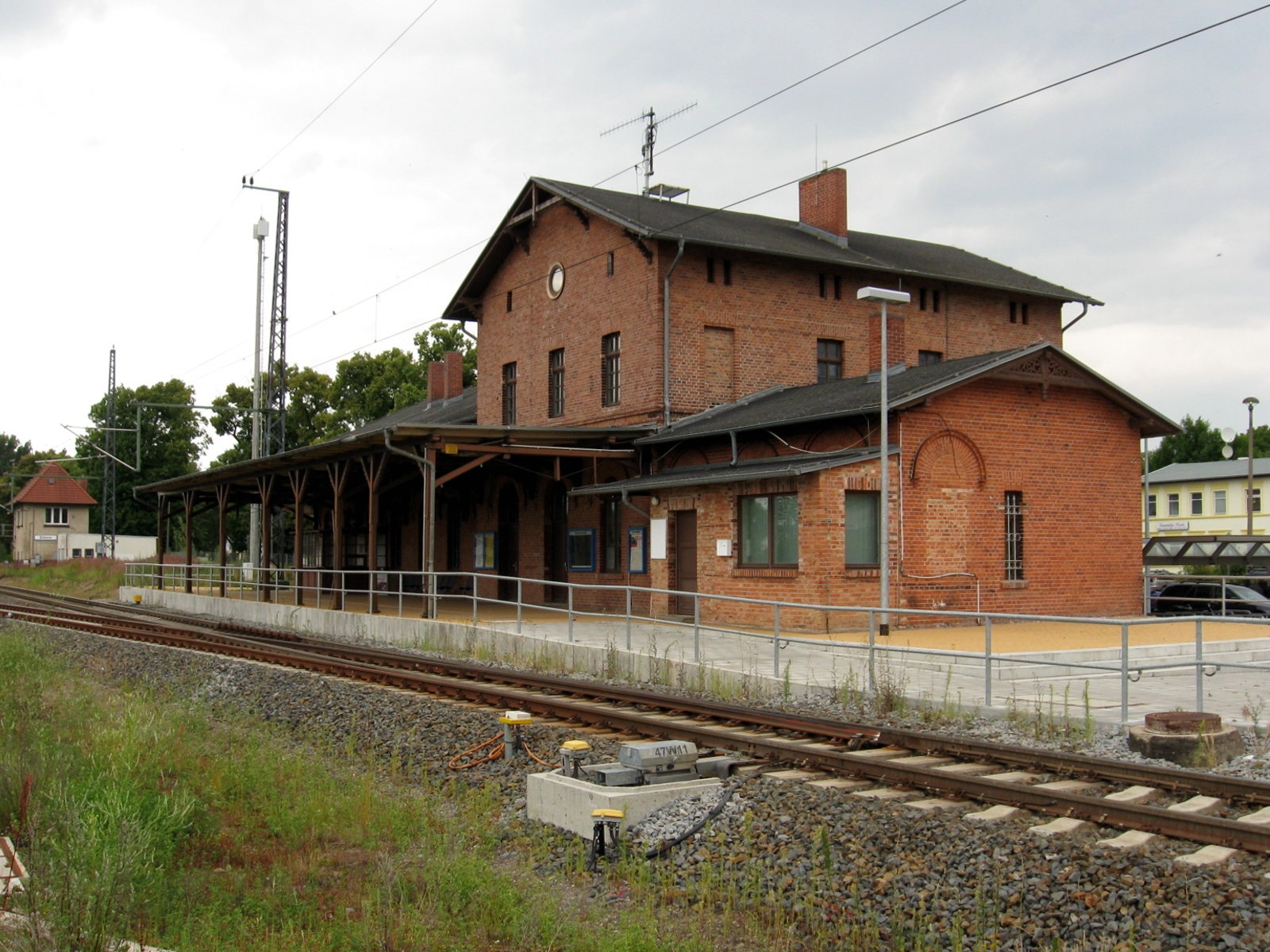
- Züssow railway station

General information
- Location: Züssow, MV, Germany
- Coordinates: DE 53°58′26″N 13°32′54″E
- Owner: Deutsche Bahn
- Operator: DB Station&Service
- Lines: Angermünde–Stralsund railway Züssow–Wolgast Hafen railway
- Platforms: 2
- Tracks: 4

Construction
- Accessible: Yes

Other information
- Website: www.bahnhof.de

History
- Opened: 1 November 1863; 162 years ago
- Electrified: 23 September 1988; 38 years ago
Services
| Preceding station | DB Fernverkehr | Following station |
|---|---|---|
| Greifswald towards Ostseebad Binz | ICE 15 | Anklam towards Saarbrücken Hbf |
| Preceding station | DB Regio Nordost | Following station |
| Groß Kiesow towards Stralsund Hbf | RE 3 | Klein Bünzow towards Jüterbog or Lutherstadt Wittenberg Hbf |
| Terminus | RB 23 | Karlsburg towards Świnoujście Centrum |
| Groß Kiesow towards Stralsund Hbf | RE 30 | Klein Bünzow towards Angermünde |
Location

Züssow (German: Bahnhof Züssow) is a railway station in the town of Züssow, Mecklenburg-Vorpommern, Germany. The station lies on the Angermünde–Stralsund railway and the Züssow–Wolgast Hafen railway and the train services are operated by Deutsche Bahn, Ostdeutsche Eisenbahn and Usedomer Bäderbahn. This station is where the junction to services onto the island of Usedom is.

== Train services ==
In the 2026 timetable the following lines stop at the station:

| Line | Route | Frequency |
|---|---|---|
| ICE 15 | Binz – Stralsund – Züssow – Berlin – Halle – Erfurt – Frankfurt – Darmstadt – Mannheim – Kaiserslautern – Saarbrücken | |
| RE 3 | Stralsund – Greifswald – Züssow – Pasewalk – Angermünde – Erberswalde – Berlin-Gesundbrunnen – Berlin Hbf – Berlin Südkreuz – Ludwigsfelde – Luckenwalde – Jüterbog – Falkenberg | Every 2 hours |
| RE 30 | Stralsund – Greifswald – Züssow – Pasewalk – Prenzlau – Angermünde | Every 2 hours |
| RB 23 | Züssow – Wolgast – Seebad Heringsdorf – Świnoujście/Swinemünde | Hourly |
