= Zarrendorf station =

Railway station in Germany

Zarrendorf

General information
- Location: Zarrendorf, MV, Germany
- Coordinates: 54°14′26″N 13°04′48″E
- Line: Stralsund–Neubrandenburg
- Platforms: 1
- Tracks: 1

History
- Electrified: 29 May 1994; 32 years ago

Services
Preceding station	DB Regio Nordost	Following station
Stralsund Hbf Terminus	RE 5	Elmenhorst towards Berlin Südkreuz
Stralsund Hbf Terminus	RE 51	Elmenhorst towards Neustrelitz Hbf
Location

Zarrendorf (German: Bahnhof Zarrendorf) is a railway station in the village of Zarrendorf, Mecklenburg-Vorpommern, Germany. The station lies on the Stralsund-Neubrandenburg railway and the train services are operated by DB Regio Nordost.

== Train services ==
The station is served by the following services:

Line	Route	Frequency
RE 5	Stralsund – Neubrandenburg – Neustrelitz – Oranienburg – Berlin – Berlin Südkreuz	Every 2 hours
RE 51	Stralsund – Neubrandenburg – Neustrelitz	Every 2 hours
