= Greifswald station =

Railway station in Germany

Greifswald
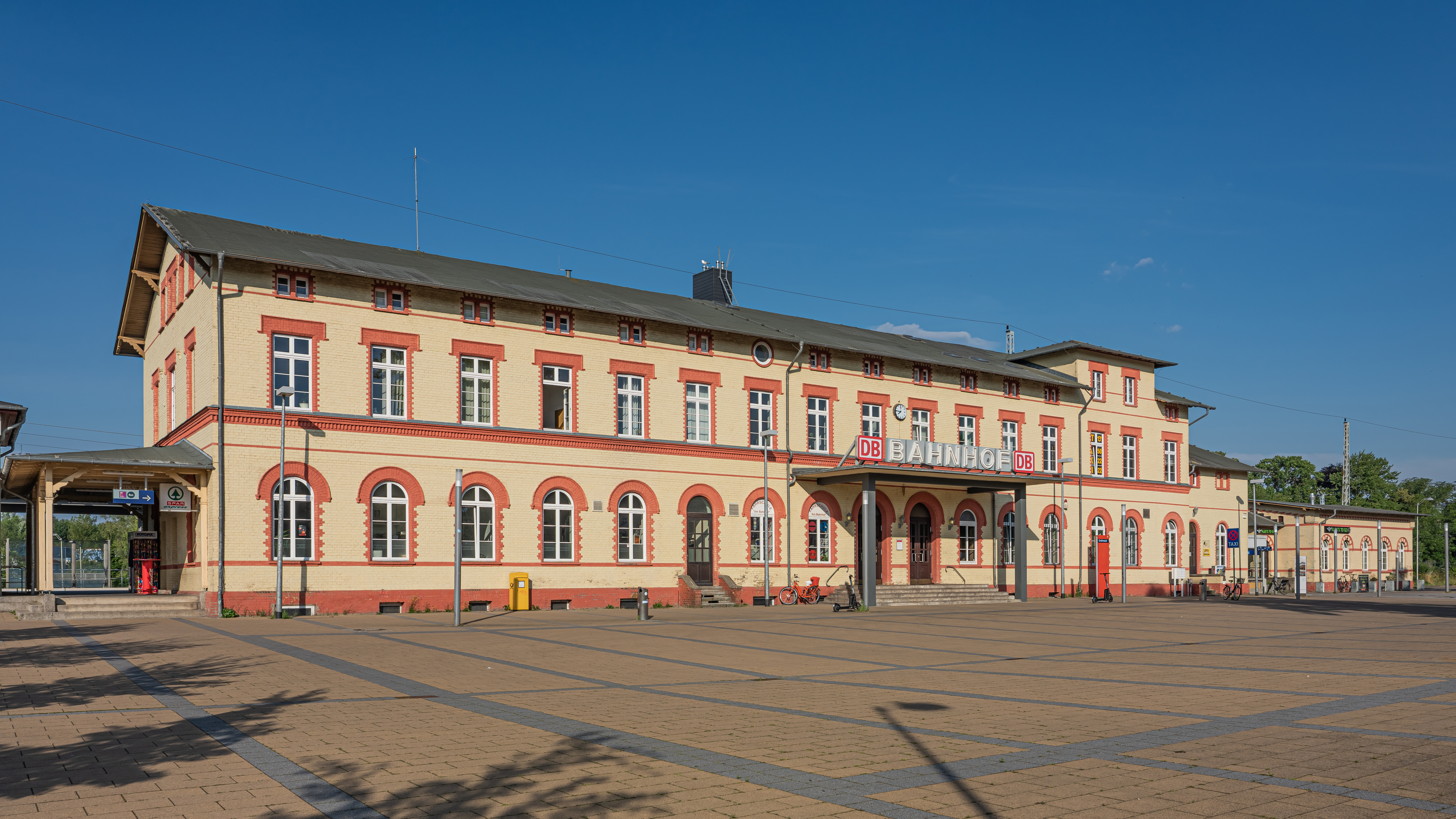
- Greifswald railway station

General information
- Location: Greifswald, MV, Germany
- Coordinates: 54°05′34″N 13°22′14″E
- Owner: Deutsche Bahn
- Operator: DB Station&Service
- Line: Angermünde–Stralsund railway
- Platforms: 1 island platform 1 side platform
- Tracks: 3

Construction
- Accessible: Yes

Other information
- Station code: 2252
- DS100 code: WGW
- IBNR: 8010139
- Category: 4
- Website: www.bahnhof.de

History
- Opened: 1 November 1863; 162 years ago
- Electrified: 9 December 1988; 37 years ago

Services
Preceding station	DB Fernverkehr	Following station
Stralsund Hbf towards Ostseebad Binz	ICE 15	Züssow towards Saarbrücken Hbf
Preceding station	DB Regio Nordost	Following station
Miltzow towards Stralsund Hbf	RE 3	Greifswald Süd towards Jüterbog or Lutherstadt Wittenberg Hbf
Miltzow towards Stralsund Hbf	RE 7	Terminus
Miltzow towards Stralsund Hbf	RE 30	Greifswald Süd towards Angermünde
Location

Greifswald (German: Bahnhof Greifswald) is a railway station in the town of Greifswald, Mecklenburg-Vorpommern, Germany. The station lies on the Angermünde–Stralsund railway and the train services are operated by Deutsche Bahn and Ostdeutsche Eisenbahn.

In the 2026 timetable the following lines stop at the station:

Line	Route	Frequency
ICE 15	Binz – Stralsund – Greifswald – Berlin – Halle – Erfurt – Frankfurt – Darmstadt – Mannheim – Kaiserslautern – Saarbrücken	Every two hours
RE 3	Stralsund – Greifswald – Züssow – Pasewalk – Angermünde – Erberswalde – Berlin-Gesundbrunnen – Berlin Hbf – Berlin Südkreuz – Ludwigsfelde – Luckenwalde – Jüterbog – Falkenberg	every 2 hours
RE 7	Stralsund – Miltzow – Greifswald	every 2 hours during peak times
RE 30	Stralsund – Greifswald – Pasewalk – Prenzlau – Angermünde	every 2 hours

== See also ==
- Rail transport in Germany
- Railway stations in Germany
