= Züssow =

- Municipality
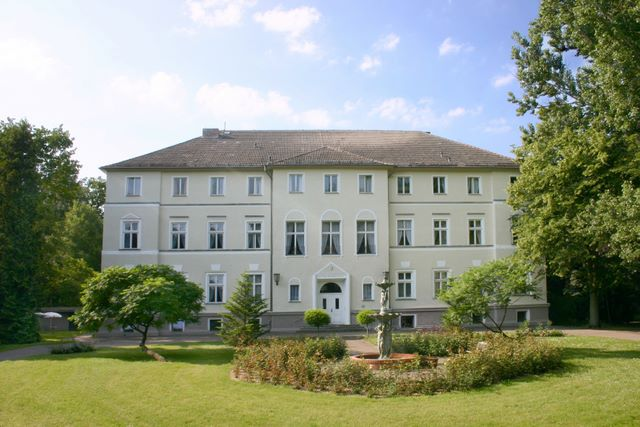
- Gutshaus Ranzin in Züssow

- Location of Züssow within Vorpommern-Greifswald district
- Interactive map of Züssow
- Location within Germany Location within Mecklenburg-Vorpommern
- Coordinates: 53°58′N 13°33′E
- Country: Germany
- State: Mecklenburg-Vorpommern
- District: Vorpommern-Greifswald
- Municipal assoc.: Züssow
- Subdivisions: 6

Government
  - Mayor: Eckhart Stöwhas

Area
  - Total: 29.52 km^{2} (11.40 sq mi)
- Elevation: 29 m (95 ft)

Population (2025-12-31)
  - Total: 1,246
  - Density: 42.21/km^{2} (109.3/sq mi)
- Time zone: UTC+01:00 (CET)
  - Summer (DST): UTC+02:00 (CEST)
- Postal codes: 17495
- Dialling codes: 038355
- Vehicle registration: VG

Züssow is a municipality in the Vorpommern-Greifswald district, in Mecklenburg-Vorpommern, Germany.

== Transport ==
Züssow railway station connects Züssow with Stralsund, Greifswald Angermünde, Eberswalde and Berlin. The station is also served by ICE, EuroCity and Intercity services connecting the area with cities in Germany and the Czech Republic. Züssow is also the station where trains for the island of Usedom connect with trains on the mainland.
