= Luckenwalde station =

Railway station in Luckenwalde, Germany

Luckenwalde
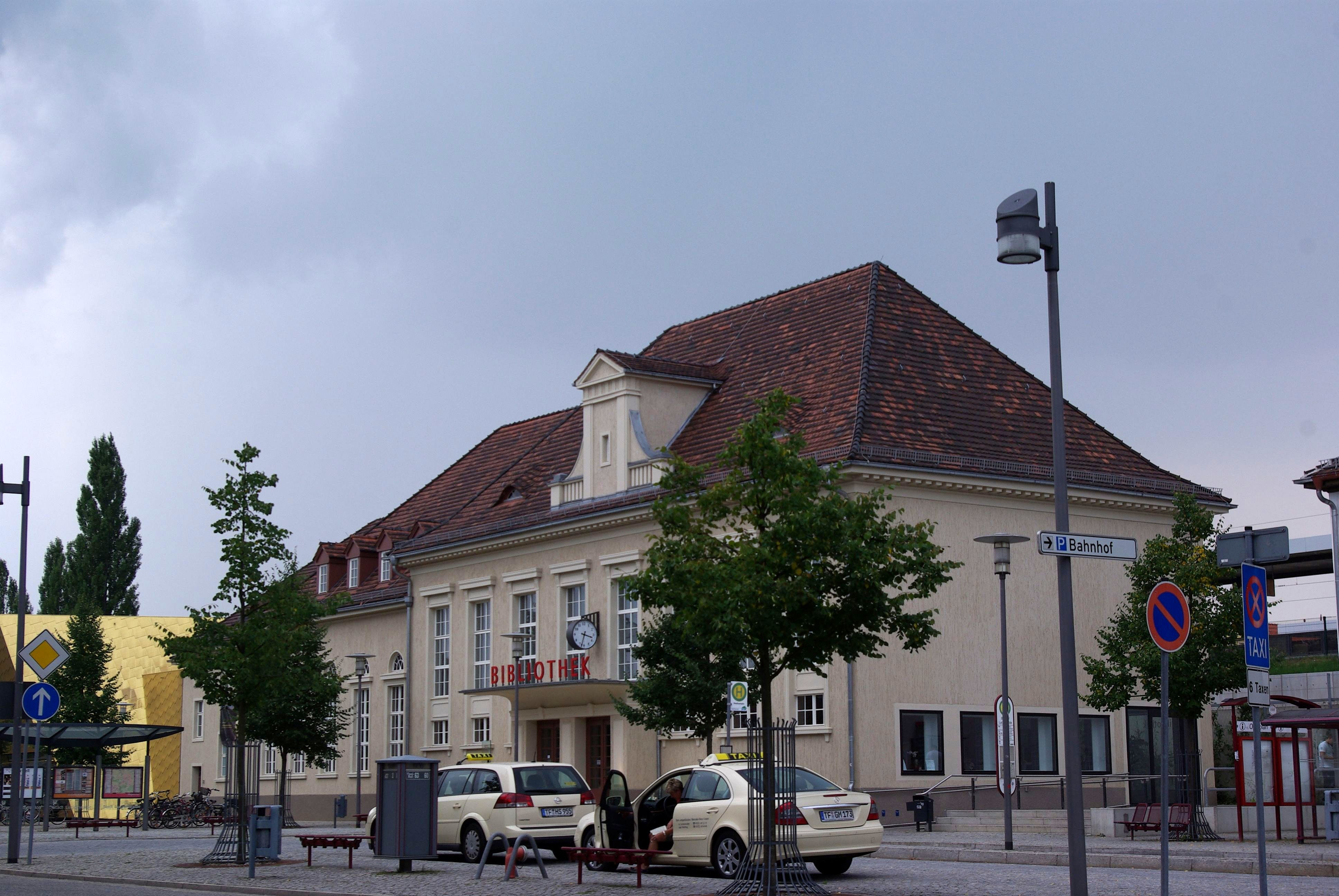
- Entrance building

General information
- Location: Bahnhofsplatz 7, Luckenwalde, Brandenburg; Germany
- Coordinates: 52°05′26″N 13°09′37″E
- Lines: Berlin–Halle km 49.8; Hohenseefeld–Luckenwalde km 46.4 (closed)
- Platforms: 2

Construction
- Accessible: Yes

Other information
- Station code: 3827
- DS100 code: BLD
- IBNR: 8012260
- Category: 5
- Fare zone: VBB: 6452
- Website: www.bahnhof.de

History
- Opened: 1 July 1841

Services
Preceding station	DB Regio Nordost	Following station
Woltersdorf (Nuthe-Urstromtal) towards Stralsund Hbf or Schwedt	RE 3	Jüterbog towards Jüterbog or Lutherstadt Wittenberg Hbf
Ludwigsfelde towards Rathenow or Stendal Hbf	RE 4	Jüterbog towards Jüterbog or Falkenberg (Elster)
Location
- Location within Brandenburg Location within Germany Location within Europe

Luckenwalde station is the station of the town of Luckenwalde in the German state of Brandenburg. It was opened in 1841. Luckenwalde was the terminus of a narrow-gauge railway from 1900 to 1939. The present entrance building is its third.

== Location ==
The station is located at line-kilometre 49.8 of the Berlin–Halle railway (Anhalterbahn), calculated from the former Anhalter Bahnhof in Berlin. It is centrally located in the town, about 600 metres (2,000 ft) west of the market square. The station borders the Bahnhofsplatz (station forecourt) and Käthe-Kollwitz-Straße. To the north, the nearest station is four kilometres away at the halt of Woltersdorf/Nuthe-Urstromtal. Jüterbog station is located about 14 kilometres (8.7 mi) further south. In addition, Luckenwalde is located in the area of the Verkehrsverbundes Berlin-Brandenburg (Berlin-Brandenburg transport association, VBB).

== History ==
=== State station ===
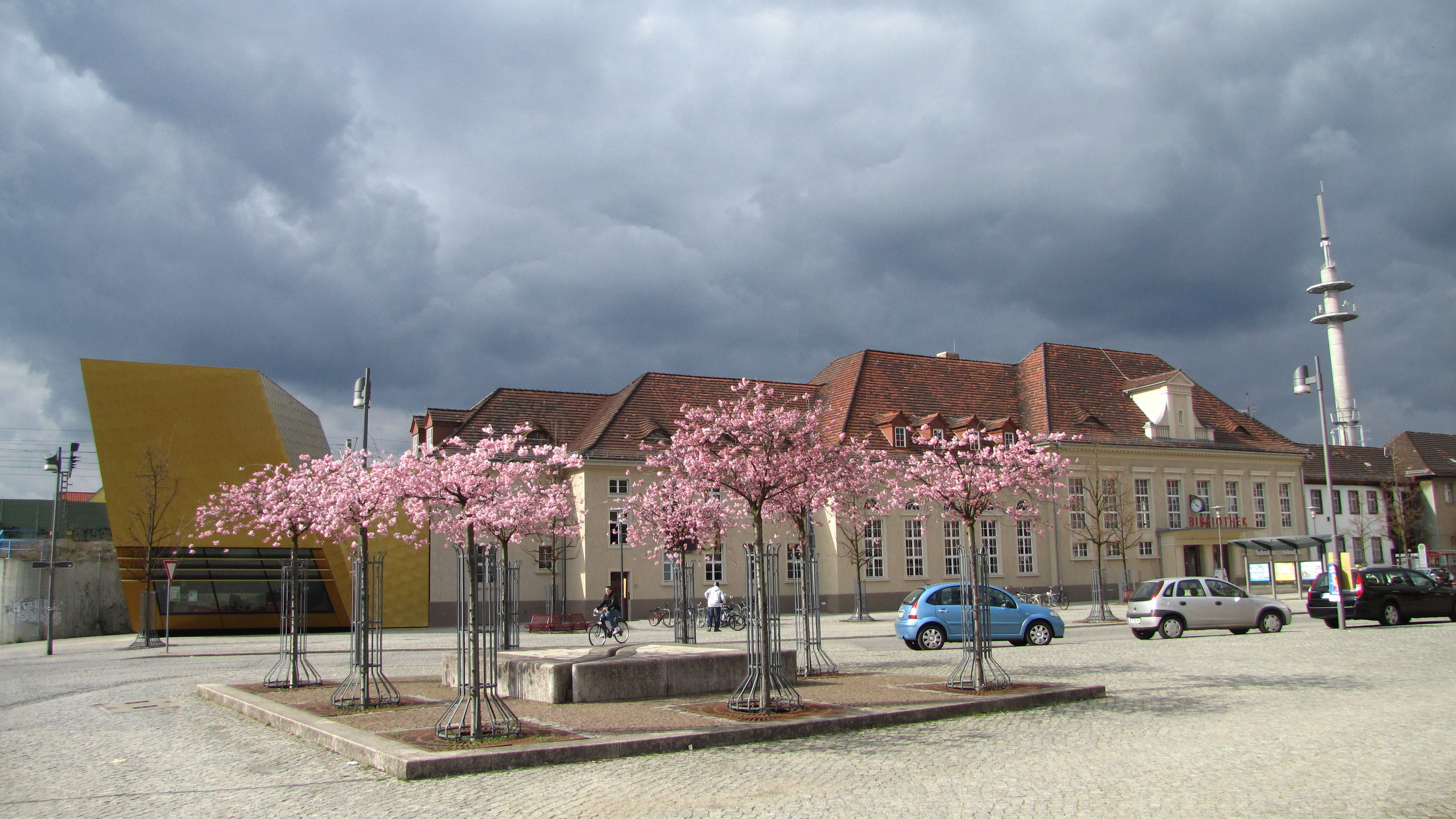
Entrance building with annex (2011)

Luckenwalde station was opened on 1 July 1841. Original considerations suggested a route via Treuenbrietzen, but the Administrative Director of the Berlin-Anhalt Railway Company (Berlin-Anhaltische Eisenbahn-Gesellschaft), Heinrich Conrad Carl selected a route via Luckenwalde. Carl also owned a factory in Luckenwalde.

After the opening of the first section of the Anhalterbahn from Berlin to Jüterbog, the opening of the rest of the line through Wittenberg to Köthen followed on 10 September 1841. An entrance building existed from the beginning. The construction of the entrance building was estimated to cost 12,000 Prussian Reichsthalers, but it actually cost 18,693 Reichsthalers.

The connection to the rail network had a positive effect on Luckenwald's economy. The upgrade of the Anhalterbahn began in 1872 in Berlin. A new entrance building was built in Luckenwalde. In contrast to the original building, this building was built on the eastern side. A pedestrian tunnel provided access to the platforms. The second entrance building had to be built because of the increasing number of passengers and to handle the dispatch of the products of Luckenwalde's industry. A freight yard with loading tracks and a small-consignment goods shed were also built.

At the beginning of the new century, plans were developed for an extensive upgrade of the Anhalterbahn. The line was to be rebuilt with four tracks between Berlin and Jüterbog. The works were not finished due to the First World War, although tracks were laid on a new embankment in the town of Luckenwalde. This work began in 1915, with some of it carried out by French prisoners of war. As part of this work, the station received a new, third station building, which was built between 1914 and 1916. The works were completed in 1917.

It was also planned to build a dedicated platform for the suburban railway. After the end of the First World War, the plans for a further upgrade of the line were revived, but this project was not pursued further after 1922. A third platform was not built. Parts of this partly-built platform were visible until the 21st century.

There has been a library in the former entrance building since 2008. Its conversion began at the end of 2006 and a gold-coloured extension was built in 2007. It cost about €3.4 million. Approximately 45,000 items can be borrowed there. The station building is a protected monument.

=== Station of the narrow-gauge railway ===
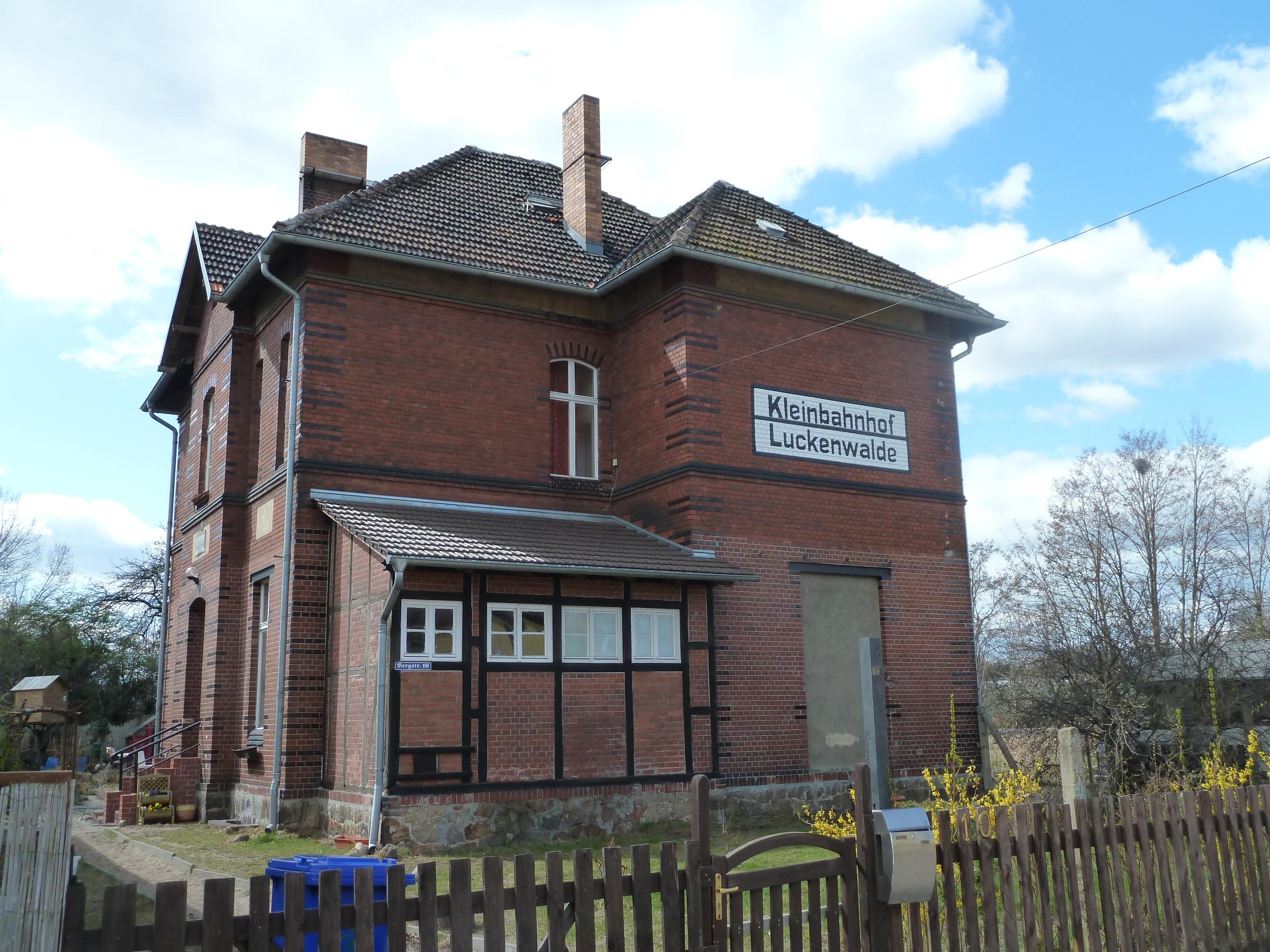
Heritage-listed entrance building of the narrow-gauge railway.

The narrow-gauge station of the 750 mm gauge railway was put into operation on 20 December 1900. There was a loading ramp from the station of the narrow-gauge railway to the standard-gauge railway. It was important for among other things the transport of agricultural products to Berlin. Passenger traffic on the section between Luckenwalde and Hohenseefeld was discontinued on 19 January 1932 and from then on passengers were carried by bus. Freight transport was also abandoned on 15 February 1939.

Passenger and freight traffic recommenced on the light railway after 1945, but traffic then ended on the southern outskirts and the old narrow-gauge station was no longer used. The old entrance building has been preserved and is under heritage protection.

== Infrastructure ==
=== Entrance building ===
The third entrance building of 1917 included the lodgings of the stationmaster and some offices. There were also waiting rooms separated by class and station restaurants in the building. The waiting room of the first class was somewhat more sumptuous. Large display boards, which gave information about the arrival of the trains, were in the waiting rooms and the lobby. Only people with tickets were allowed to enter the platform through a ticket barrier. People who wanted to go to the platform had to buy a platform ticket, even if they did not want to go by train.

=== Platforms and tracks ===
From the reconstruction of the station in the 1910s to the end of the 1990s, the station had two island platforms. The station was rebuilt after 2000. Since then, a total of four tracks have run through the station. Two of these are platform tracks with outside platforms. These are numbered 3 and 4. Their length is 270 metres (890 ft) each and their platform height is 76 cm (30 in).

=== Postal station ===
There was a loading station to the municipal gasworks at the postal station. It had two loading ramps. A passenger tunnel connected the postal station with the platforms. There were service rooms for the railway staff on the upper floor of the two-storey building.

=== Other facilities ===
To the left of the main entrance of the building was the passenger tunnel to the third, uncompleted platform.

== Passenger services ==
The station was served by the following service in 2026:

Line	Route		Interval (min)	Operator
RE 3	(Lutherstadt Wittenberg –) Jüterbog – Luckenwalde – Berlin – Angermünde –	Schwedt (Oder)	60 (120 Wittenberg–Jüterbog and Angermünde–Schwedt/Stralsund)	DB Regio Nordost
RE 3	(Lutherstadt Wittenberg –) Jüterbog – Luckenwalde – Berlin – Angermünde –	Züssow – Stralsund	60 (120 Wittenberg–Jüterbog and Angermünde–Schwedt/Stralsund)	DB Regio Nordost
RE 4	(Falkenberg (Elster) –) Jüterbog – Luckenwalde – Ludwigsfelde – Teltow – Berlin – Wustermark – Rathenow (– Stendal)		60 Jüterbog–Rathenow (120 Falkenberg–Jüterbog / Rathenow–Stendal)	Ostdeutsche Eisenbahn

Several bus lines stop in front of the station.
