= Angermünde–Stralsund railway =

Railway line in Germany

Angermünde–Stralsund
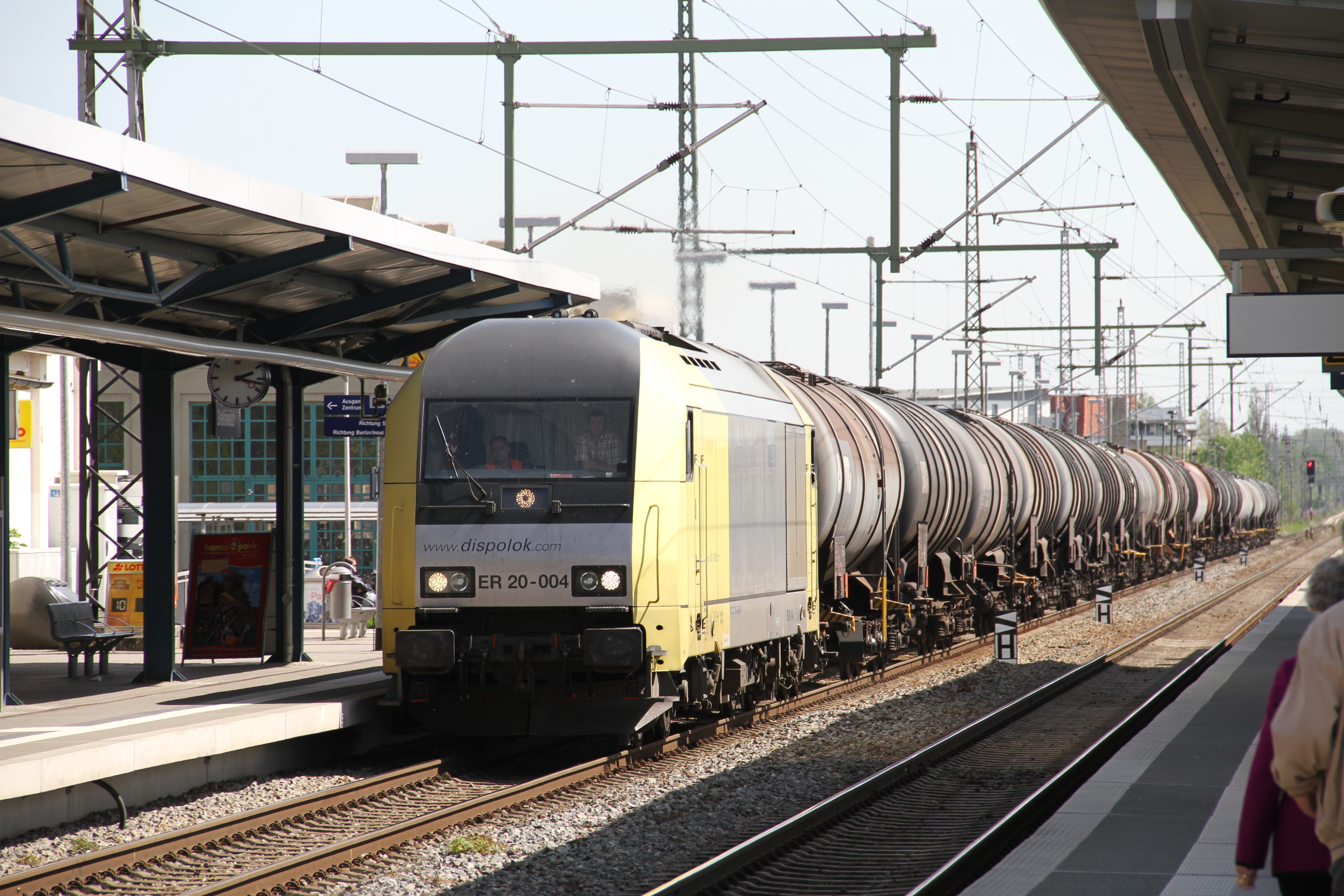
- A freight train at Greifswald station in 2012

Overview
- Line number: 6081
- Locale: Brandenburg and Mecklenburg-Vorpommern, Germany

Service
- Route number: 175 Pasewalk–Jatznick; 193 Züssow–Stralsund; 203 Angermünde–Stralsund

Technical
- Line length: 170.1 km (105.7 mi)
- Number of tracks: 2
- Track gauge: 1,435 mm (4 ft 8 1/2 in) standard gauge
- Electrification: 15 kV/16.7 Hz AC overhead catenary
- Operating speed: 140 km/h (87.0 mph) (maximum)
Route map
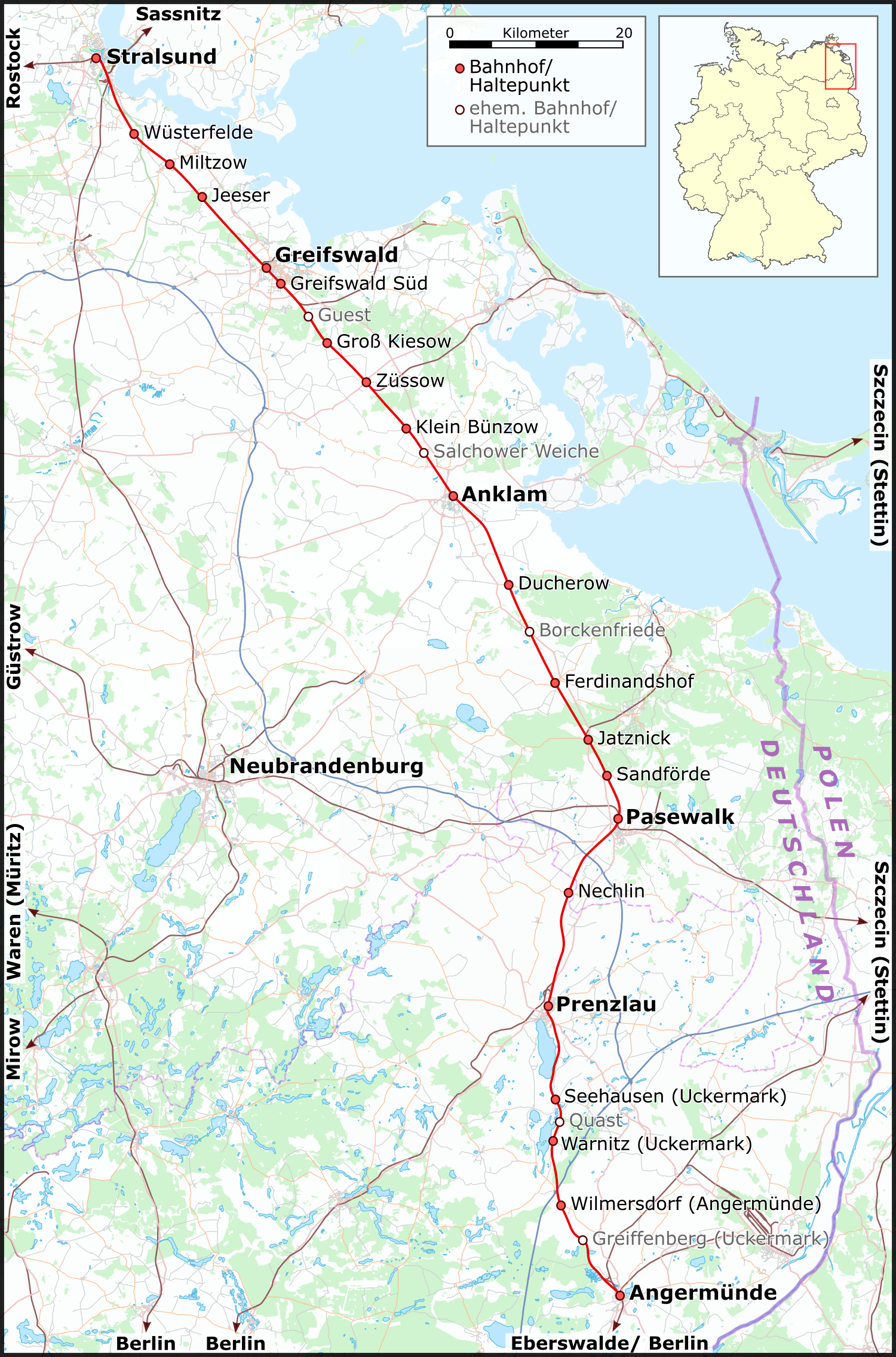
- Source: German railway atlas

The Angermünde–Stralsund railway is a major railway in the north-eastern German states of Brandenburg and Mecklenburg-Vorpommern, which is part of the long-distance line from Berlin to Rügen. The line is one of the oldest lines in Western Pomerania and was built and operated by the Berlin-Stettin Railway Company (Berlin-Stettiner Eisenbahn-Gesellschaft) from 1863.

== Route ==
The line start at Angermünde station, where the line branches off to the north from the main line of the Berlin–Szczecin railway. It first runs along the Uckermark lakes and the adjoining Uecker river through Prenzlau to Pasewalk. The border between Brandenburg and Mecklenburg-Vorpommern is about 1800 metres north of Nechlin station. The line swings to the north northwest to Pasewalk and runs on a mostly straight course through the foothills of Ueckermünder Heide. In Ferdinandshof the line runs for a few hundred metres through an extension of the Friedländer Große Wiese (a largely drained bog). It passes through Ducherow, which until 1945 was the start of a branch line to Heringsdorf, and continues to Anklam. About five kilometres before Anklam station the line turns more to the northwest. The line runs through Züssow to Greifswald. The last section of the line to Stralsund runs at a distance of about five kilometres from the coast. Before Stralsund the line turns back to the north and ends at Stralsund Hauptbahnhof in the suburb of Tribseer.

Since parts of the line crosses boggy terrain and several small and medium-sized rivers, several bridges and culverts are necessary. Major bridges include the crossing of the Ryck at Greifswald and the Zarow in Ferdinandshof. The Anklam railway bridge, a bascule bridge over the Peene, however, is most elaborate engineering structure on the line.

In addition, the line crosses in its course several main roads and autobahns, including the A 20 autobahn, which crosses the line on the Uecker Viaduct. Federal highway B 109 runs between Prenzlau and Greifswald largely parallel to the line and crosses it six times.

== History ==
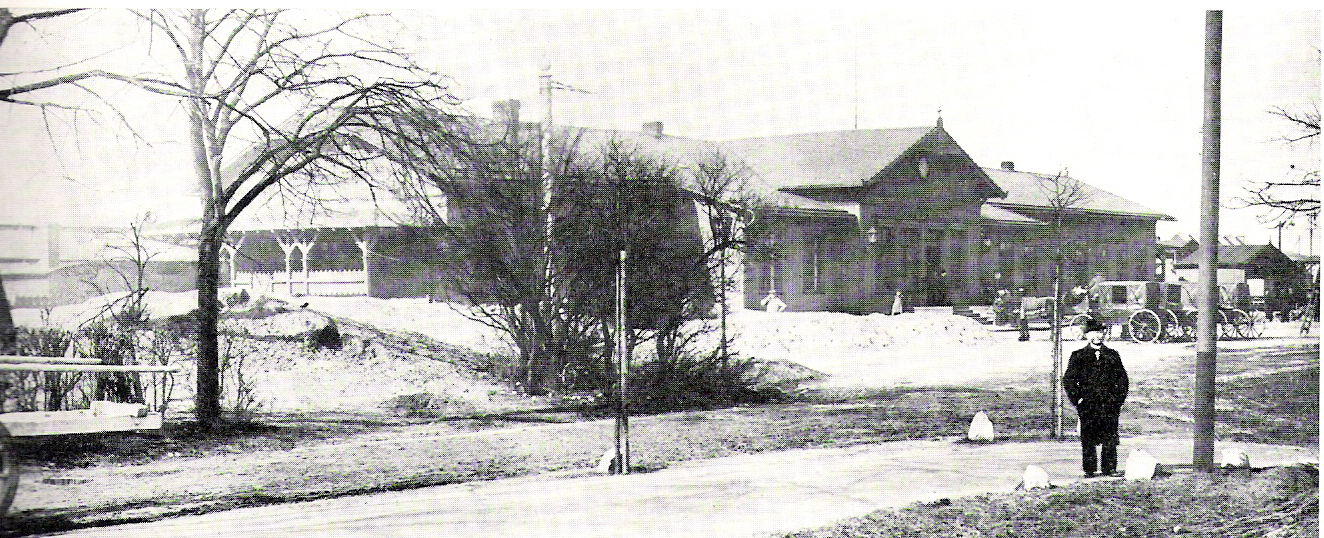
Stralsund station in 1870

The first plans to build a branch line towards Pomerania arose with the development of plans for the Berlin–Szczecin railway in 1837. The city of Prenzlau approached the planning committee for the Berlin-Stettin Railway Company (BStE) to ask it to build the line to Stettin (now Szczecin) as close as possible to Prenzlau. The Prussian inspector of road building, Friedrich Neuhaus investigated the various route alternatives and favoured a route via Prenzlau. Two years later, Prenzlau sent a deputation to offer a grant equivalent to 30,000–50,000 marks to sway the committee accordingly. Furthermore, it presented the benefits of a northern alignment via Prenzlau rather than a direct connection. These were mainly flatter terrain for the construction of the railway and the connection of the centre of Uckermark to the railway network.

The committee agreed that the line could run two kilometres from Prenzlau. A branch-line would provide a direct link. A later extension to the Pomeranian port cities was also considered. A discussion with these cities had already taken place, but the BStE demanded the financial participation of Prenzlaus and the port cities, before they would build such a line. Since Prenzlau refused to invest in the line, the BStE decided to build its main line along the southern route. The Prenzlau magistrate, however, succeeded in having a station established at Passow and a highway constructed between the two towns, which at least guarantee the first connection to the line from 1843.

In subsequent years, Prenzlau continued to campaign for a connection and hoped for the support of the Pomeranian port cities, especially in 1842 when plans surfaced for a direct connection from Berlin to Stralsund via Neustrelitz. As it was predicted that only one railway would be built initially, this created rivalry between the supporters of both routes. The Pomeranian cities, however, saw an advantage in the route designated as the Northern Railway running through Mecklenburg-Strelitz.

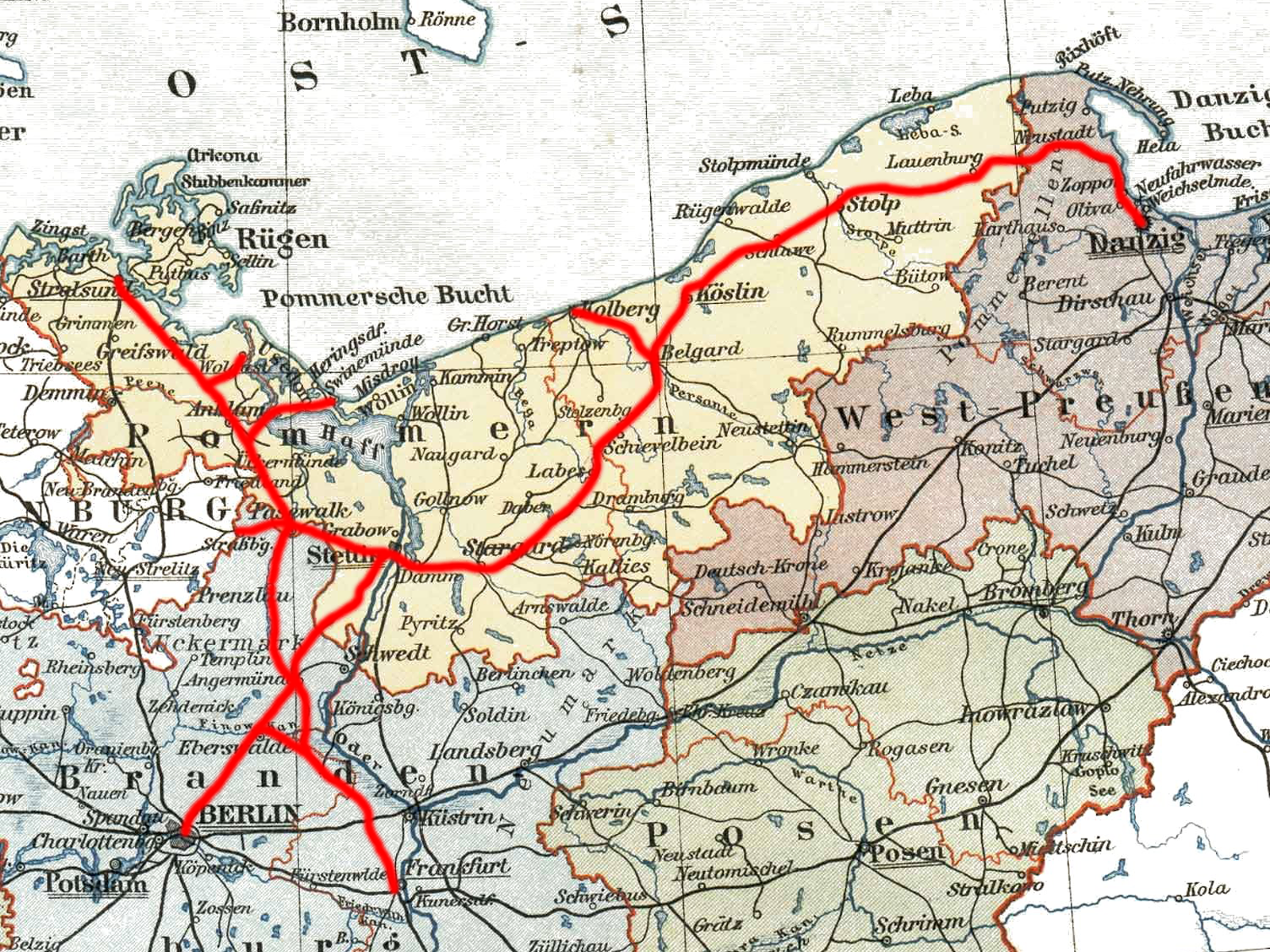
Network of the Berlin-Stettin Railway Company in 1879

Although the Northern Railway, ran through a more sparsely populated area, the line was licensed by Prussian King Friedrich William IV, as a state railway, on 18 June 1853. His ministers did not support the construction of a state railway, causing the king to change his mind the same year on 16 November 1853, when he agreed to the construction of three lines in Western Pomerania between Passow and Greifswald, Züssow and Wolgast and Pasewalk and Szczecin. The decision to build an extension from Greifswald to Stralsund followed later. Construction and management of all three routes was undertaken by the BStE.

In the following years up to the start of construction, however, the beginning and end of the line not yet been determined exactly. Angermünde and Passow were considered for the start of the line, as one city was closer to Berlin and the other was closer to Szczecin. Meanwhile, the option of starting the line in Pasewalk and running on the branch line between Pasewalk and Szczecin was considered. Eventually, in 1860, Angermünde was selected for the start of the line.

The original preference for the end of the line was Greifswald. Only after the approval of the Prussian War Ministry—Stralsund was a fortress at the time—and that of the Vorpommern communal parliament was the line able to continue to Stralsund.

After the final contract was signed on 26 February 1861, actual construction began at several places on 1 August 1861. Preliminary work had already been undertaken in 1859. The line was built as a single track with the track formation prepared for a second track. Eight optical telegraph towers per Prussian mile (7,532.5 metres) and a continuous double telegraph line were installed parallel to the line. Stations buildings were built in a neoclassical style and provided where necessary with a carriage shed. As carriages were partly manoeuvred with horses, some of these carriage shed also had their own stables. Engine shed were also established at the larger stations in Prenzlau and Pasewalk and in Anklam and Greifswald connections were built to ports.

The construction of the line itself proved to be mostly straightforward as the line ran mainly over flat terrain. However, bogs had to be drained to prevent the tracks subsiding. The biggest technical hurdle was the construction of river crossings over the Uecker north of Prenzlau, the Zarow in Ferdinandshof, the Peene at Anklam and the Ryck in Greifswald. In the last two swing bridges were used in order not to hinder shipping traffic on the rivers. The construction of these bridges, however, caused the planned opening date to slide, so that initially only the Angermünde–Anklam section was opened on 16 March 1863. The Prussian Minister of Commerce. Von Itzenplitz ordered a temporary stop to construction of the Greifswald–Stralsund section of the line in order that the exact location of Stralsund station could be clarified. After the selection of a site in Tribseer, a suburb to be west of the old town, work recommenced.

The first special train carrying the Prussian King William I ran on 26 October 1863. The first official passenger and goods trains ran on 1 November 1863. At the same time a branch line from Züssow to Wolgast was also opened. The stage coach postal services was closed in parallel with the opening of the railway.

=== Operations in the early years ===
In the first years there were seven pairs of trains each day between Berlin, Angermünde and Stralsund. Of these, four pairs were pure passenger trains, one pair was a pure freight train and two pairs were mixed trains. The planned top speed was 75 km/h for express trains, 56 km/h for ordinary passenger trains and 35 km/h for freight trains. Running times were about four hours.

In the early years, trains to Stralsund and Szczecin ran together to Angermünde, where they were uncoupled. As passenger traffic grew more strongly than was initially expected, the BStE began to run separate trains on these routes a few years later. The opening of the Ducherow–Swinoujsciein line in 1876 enabled a continuous connection to Usedom and the opening in 1883 of the Altefähr–Bergen line—with trains carried by ferry between Stralsund and Altefähr—further increased the number of services. In 1891 the latter line was extended to Sassnitz, which from 1897 was served by a mail steamer service towards Trelleborg. In 1909 this was replaced by a train ferry, the Königslinie ("Royal Line"). Simultaneously with the establishment of the train ferry, a pair of night trains was also established between Berlin and Stockholm.

The entire route was operated by the BStE until 1879, when it was nationalised and became the Königliche Direktion der Berlin-Stettiner Eisenbahn (Royal Directorate of the Berlin-Szczecin railway), one of the Prussian state railways. From 1895 it was called the Königliche Eisenbahn-Direktion Stettin ("Royal Railway Directorate Szczecin", Stettin KED).

As the condition of the line could no longer handle the ever-increasing traffic, Stralsund station was rebuilt in 1905 and the track was duplicated in 1907 and 1908. At the same time the Peene bridge in Anklam was replaced, with the old rolling bascule bridge replaced by two bascule bridges with a span of 32 metres.

In parallel, there was increasing freight traffic on the line, partly as a result of the connection of agricultural and light railways to it, such as the Mecklenburg-Pomeranian Narrow Gauge Railway. The main commodities were agricultural products such as potatoes, sugar beet or cereals.

=== Inter-war period ===
In 1920, the state railways were combined in the newly founded Deutsche Reichsbahn. Nevertheless, state railway locomotives were used exclusively almost during the following 20 years.

The construction of the Rügen embankment in 1936 involved some reconstruction of the Angermünde–Stralsund line. In Stralsund, a new signal box was built, the tracks of Stralsund freight yard were extended and a single-track curve, the so-called "Berlin curve", was built to the Angermünde–Stralsund line, so that the reversal in Stralsund station could be avoided, especially for freight trains. At the same time the line was upgraded to allow higher speeds. The speed limit was raised from 100 km/h along the entire route to 120 km/h on the Angermünde–Ducherow section (and continuing on the branch to Heringsdorf) and 110 km/h on the Ducherow–Stralsund section.

The increased line speeds reduced journey time. In 1939, the fastest train on the Berlin–Stralsund route took about three hours and ten minutes—a Regional-Express took about the same time in 2007. This increased patronage and Deutsche Reichsbahn had to increase services continuously. The pre-war peak in traffic was reached in 1939 with up to eight pairs of passenger trains daily.

=== Deutsche Reichsbahn after 1945 ===
During the Second World War the line was damaged or destroyed at several places. The station in Prenzlau was burnt as a result of a bomb attack and both the Ucker bridge at Nechlin and the Welse bridge at Angermünde were damaged. In many places bomb craters prevented continuous operations. Three temporary bridges had to be built in Anklam alone. In addition, the Karnin Lift Bridge on the line to Świnoujście (German: Swinemünd) was destroyed and the Rügen embankment was damaged. Shortages were exacerbated by the dismantling of the second track at the direction of the Soviet Military Administration in Germany and the removal of locomotives and wagons as reparations to the USSR in 1947–48. After initial repairs the first trains ran on the line in June 1945. Continuous operations between Berlin, Angermünde and Stralsund was possible at the end of the year.

In 1947, services ran over the Rügen embankment again. The importance of the Stralsund–Angermünde line increased as it again became part of a transit link to Sweden. In the 1950s, the Welse and Ucker bridge were rebuilt to handle growing traffic. During the 1960s and the 1970s increasing numbers of passengers travelled on the line, with increasing holiday traffic to the Baltic Sea and commuter traffic in the cities. In 1970, Deutsche Reichsbahn (East German railways) operated 56 trains per day on the Pasewalk–Jatznick section and 44 passenger trains on the Anklam–Züssow section. This increased in 1975 to 66 and 46 trains respectively. Together with the freight trains, mainly transporting products of the metal and petroleum industries, the capacity on the single track line was nearly exhausted. The reconstruction of the second track was thus essential for the further development of the line.

Therefore, starting in 1973, Deutsche Reichsbahn duplicated the line all the way from Bernau to Angermünde and Stralsund, together with the Angermünde–Passow section (on the line to Szczecin) and the connecting curve between the two lines at Angermünde. In addition, the existing track was renewed, the bridge over the Peene at Anklam was replaced by a new bridge and in Prenzlau a new relay interlocking was installed. Operation of the second track began between 1973 and 1978, although a short section near Angermünde was not completed until 1987. Along with the doubling of the track in the 1970s, the permissible axle load on the line was increased from 18 to 20 tons. This was mainly needed for heavy freight to the petrochemical complex (Petrolchemisches Kombinat, now PCK Raffinerie) at Schwedt.

A few years after the completion of the second track the new ferry terminal the district of Mukran in Sassnitz was opened originally only for the transport of freight to and from the Soviet Union, bypassing Poland. It was anticipated that traffic on the Berlin–Angermünde–Stralsund railway would continue to rise. To permit an increase in capacity, the line was included in East Germany’s electrification program. This provided for continuous electrification between Berlin and Sassnitz, including the Angermünde–Stendell and Züssow–Wolgast Hafen lines, with a total length of 340 kilometres. In addition a special design for electrification was installed on the Ziegelgraben Bridge—the bascule bridge on the Rügen embankment—and on the similarly constructed bridge over the Peene in Anklam. When the bridge is opened the electric lines are rotated outward, without interrupting the current. Between 1988 and 1989 electrification of the line was put into operation as follows:

- 6 March 1988: Angermünde–Prenzlau (37.6 km)
- 28 May 1988: Prenzlau–Pasewalk (24.0 km)
- 24 September 1988: Pasewalk–Züssow (59.6 km)
- 9 September 1988: Züssow–Greifswald (17.3 km)
- 17 December 1988: Greifswald–Stralsund (31.2 km)

=== After German reunification and the future ===
Shortly after the political changes in East Germany in 1989/1990 both passenger and freight traffic fell, since traffic shifted to the road. In 1990/91 the Punktförmige Zugbeeinflussung (PZB, “Indusi”) train protection system was installed on the line. On 1 January 1994, Deutsche Reichsbahn was absorbed into Deutsche Bahn (DB).

The fall in passenger numbers was soon used by DB as an opportunity to remove the little used stations at Greiffenberg and Dauer from the new timetable in 1995 and the station of Borckenfriede was closed at the 1997 timetable change. The station of Wilmersdorf, which was closed in 1995, was, however, reopened in 1996.

The number of inter-regional freight trains the Berlin–Sassnitz-Mukran route fell in the 1990s due to changes in commodity flows, since more trains ran to and from the ports of Rostock and Hamburg. Regional freight traffic fell as a result of the rationalisation of freight facilities to reduce costs.

Since the early 2000s the line has been served by DB's Regional-Express line 3, the trains of Usedomer Bäderbahn (Züssow–Stralsund) and the Ostseeland-Verkehr (Pasewalk–Jatznick). On the two sections with additional services, trains run at approximately 60-minute intervals; the rest of the line is served at 120-minute intervals.

In 2001, the power supply point at Guest was replaced by an autotransformer. As a result, the line from Stralsund to Prenzlau is the only line in Germany operated with autotransformers.

The entire Berlin–Stralsund–Sassnitz–Angermünde main line was included in the Federal Transport Infrastructure Plan (Bundesverkehrswegeplan) in 2003. This envisages the upgrading of the line for 160 km/h (instead of 140 km/h) by 2015. The running time of a Regional-Express train would be reduced from three hours and ten minutes by about 45 minutes. Investment of about €200 million is planned.

Although the line has been partly upgraded for 160 km/h, the current train protection only allows speeds of 120 km/h.

== Current operations ==
In regional services the entire length of the line is served by Regional-Express services on line RE 3 of DB Regio Nordost to and from Berlin and Elsterwerda. This is augmented by Usedomer Bäderbahn services between Züssow and Stralsund (with connections to Barth and Świnoujście) and services of Ostseeland-Verkehr between Jatznick and Pasewalk (with connections to Ueckermünde and to Schwerin and Lübeck). In the summer months an additional pair of excursion trains run as the UsedomExpress between Berlin and Seebad Heringsdorf.

The Intercity (IC) line 27 services between Binz and Dresden as well as the IC line 51 between Binz and Cologne run over the full length of the line. An additional pair of trains on IC line 26 runs on Fridays and Saturdays during the summer months between Heringsdorf and Hamburg or Cologne (via Rostock), running on the Züssow–Stralsund section. The long-distance services stop in Stralsund, Greifswald, Züssow, Anklam, Pasewalk, Prenzlau and Angermünde. Since 28 March 2011, a pair of Intercity-Express services runs from Monday to Friday at off-peak times between Stralsund and Munich; however, they do not stop in Prenzlau and Bernau due to their low platforms.

Long-distance freight traffic from the Sassnitz-Mukran ferry terminal run mainly at night. In 2008, DB Schenker Rail handled carloads of regional traffic from the stations of Miltzow and Pasewalk (including traffic on the branch line to Drögeheide) once or twice a week. If required, DB Schenker Rail also runs full trains to and from the port of Greifswald (especially oil), Lubmin, the port of Anklam (mainly wood and construction materials), Anklam (sugar), Torgelow (wood) and Prenzlau (mainly construction materials).

Selected railway stations on the line

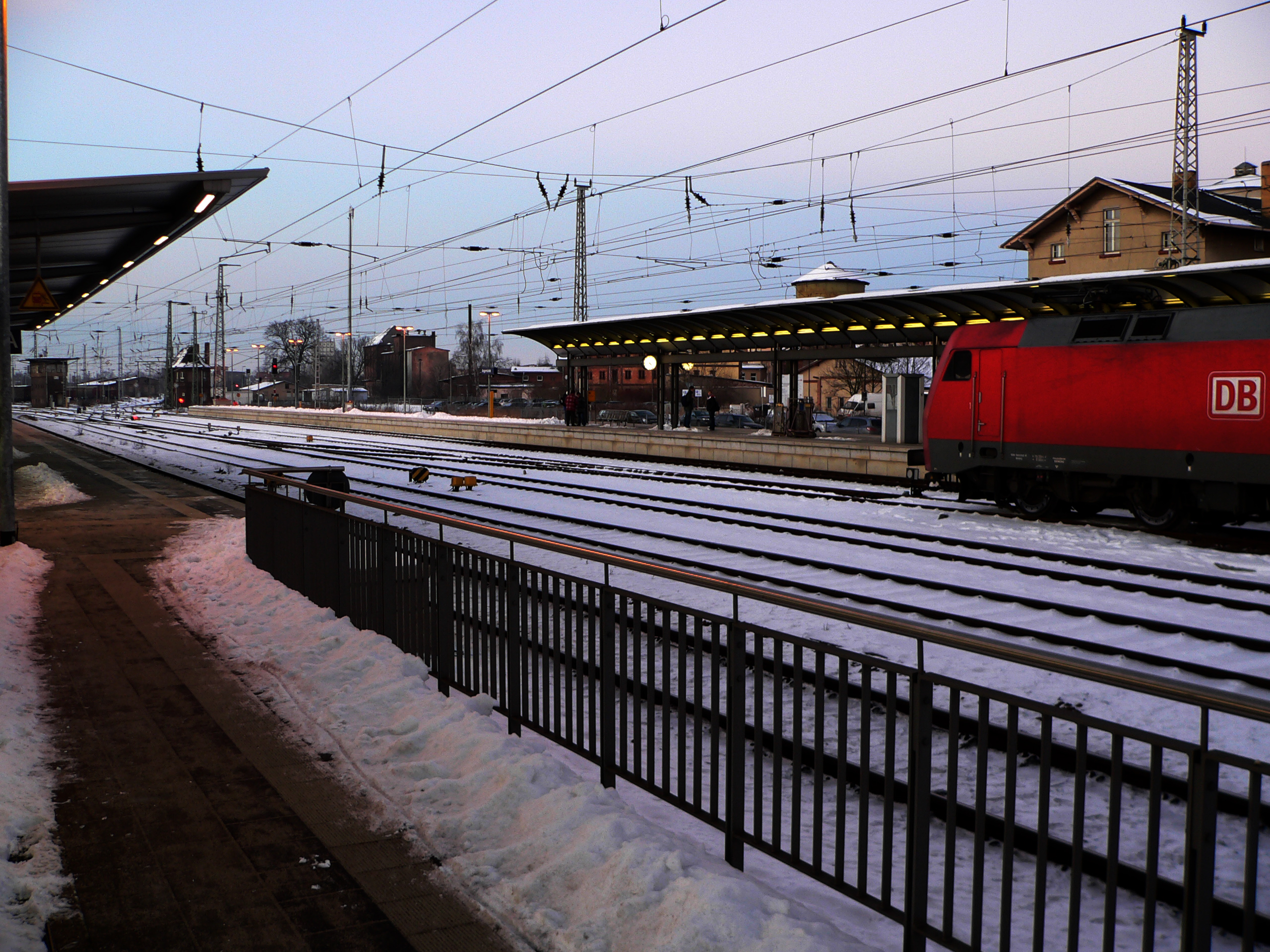
Angermünde station

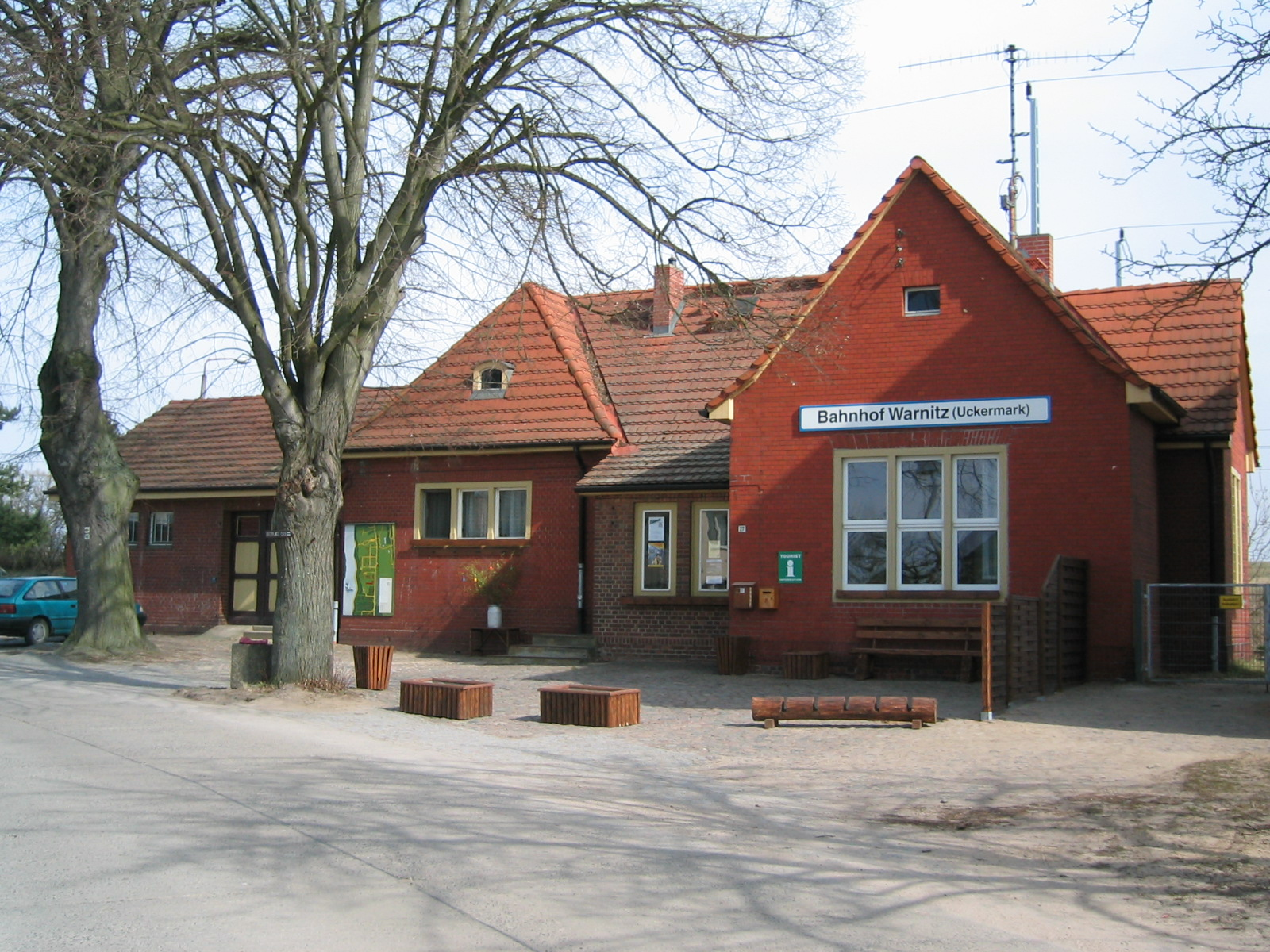
Warnitz (Uckermark) station

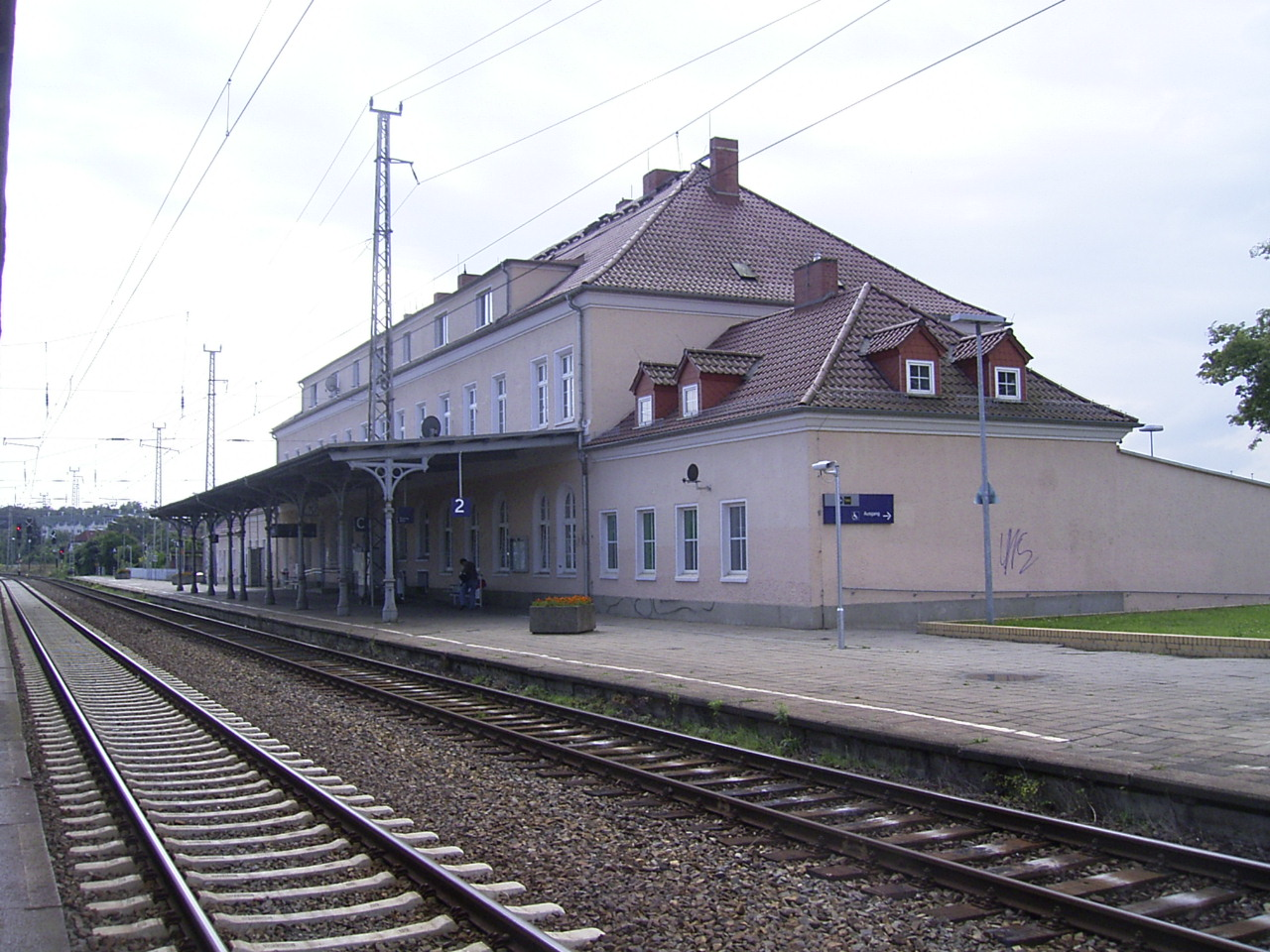
Prenzlau station

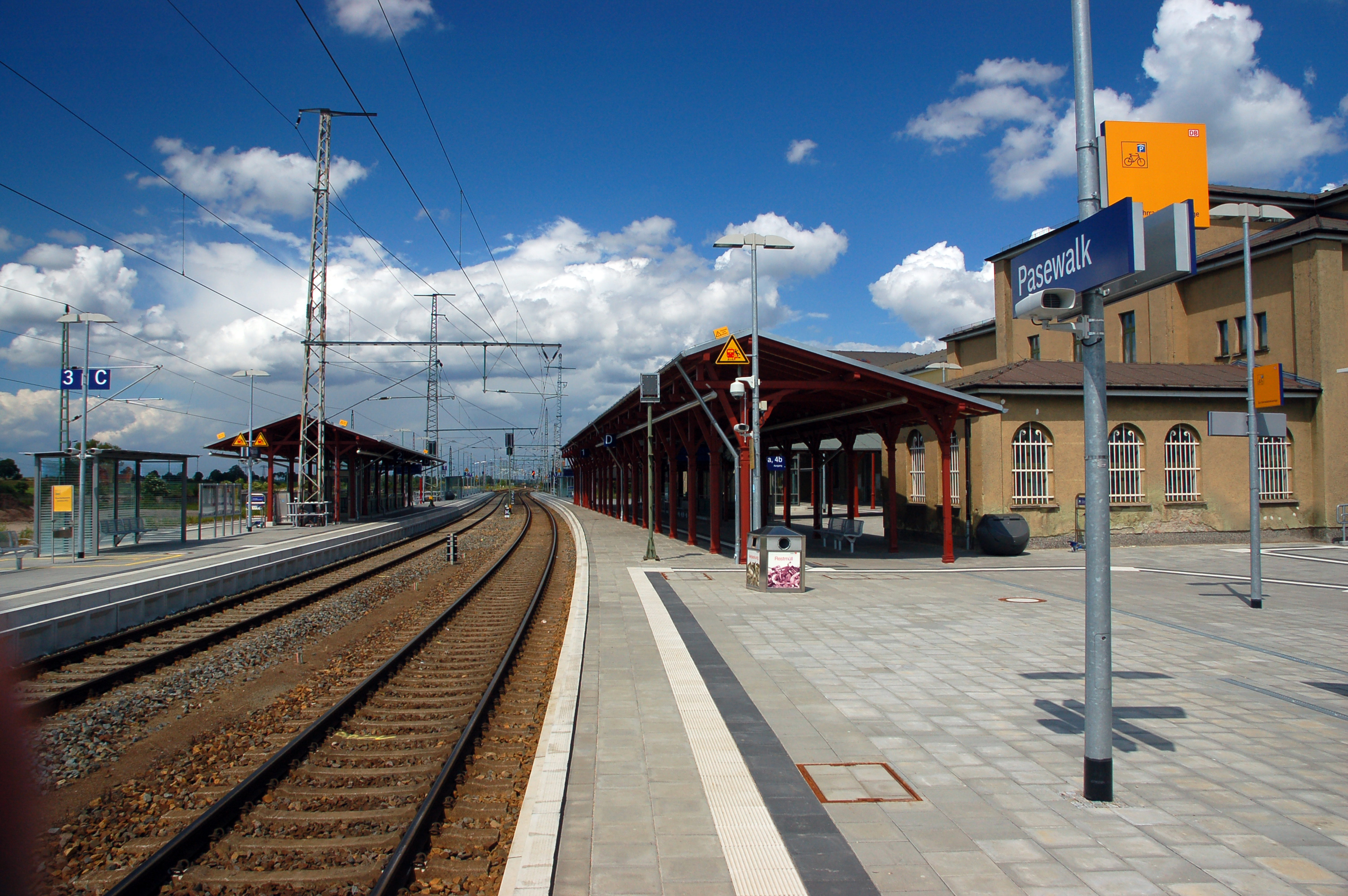
Pasewalk station

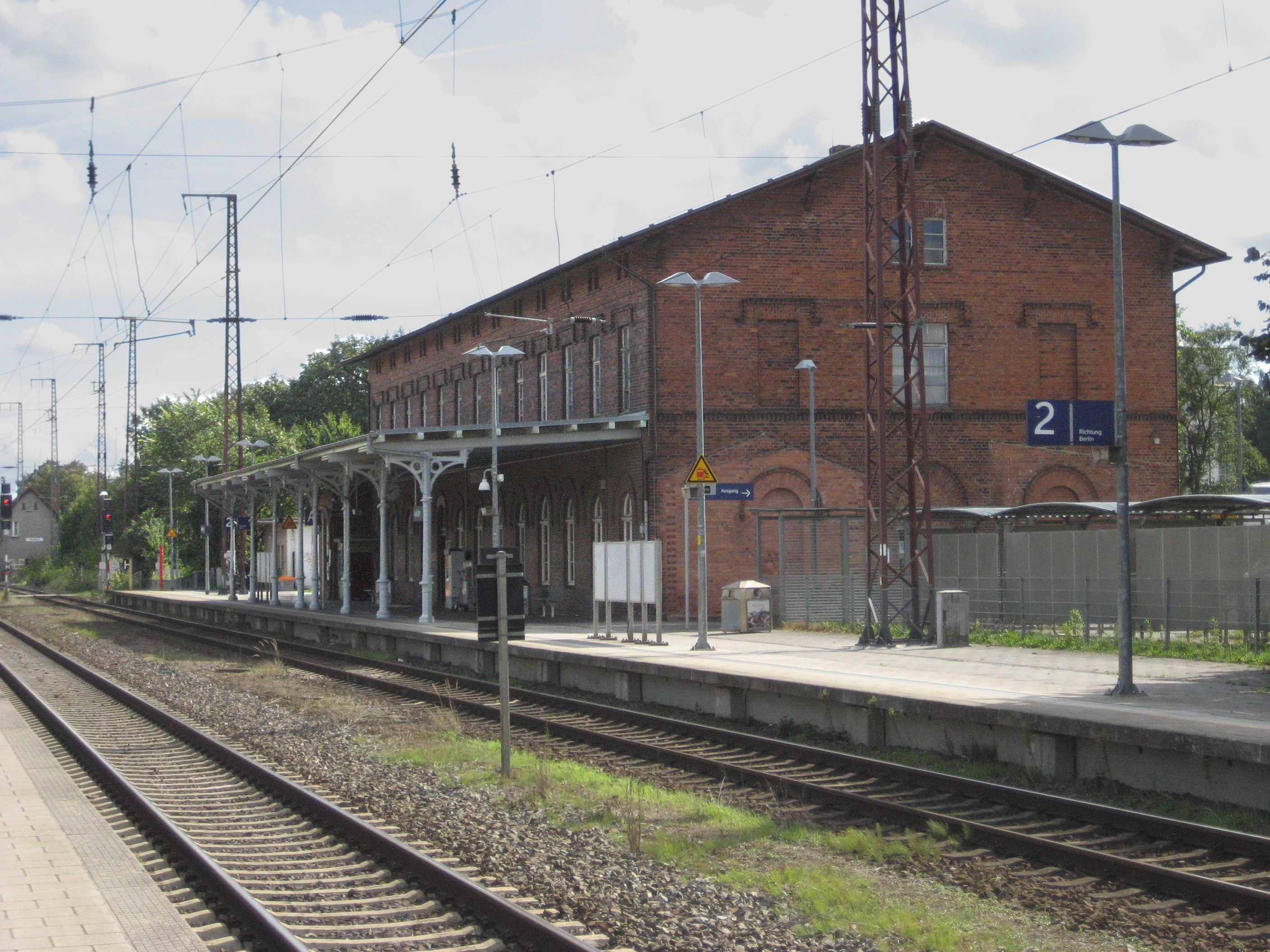
Anklam station

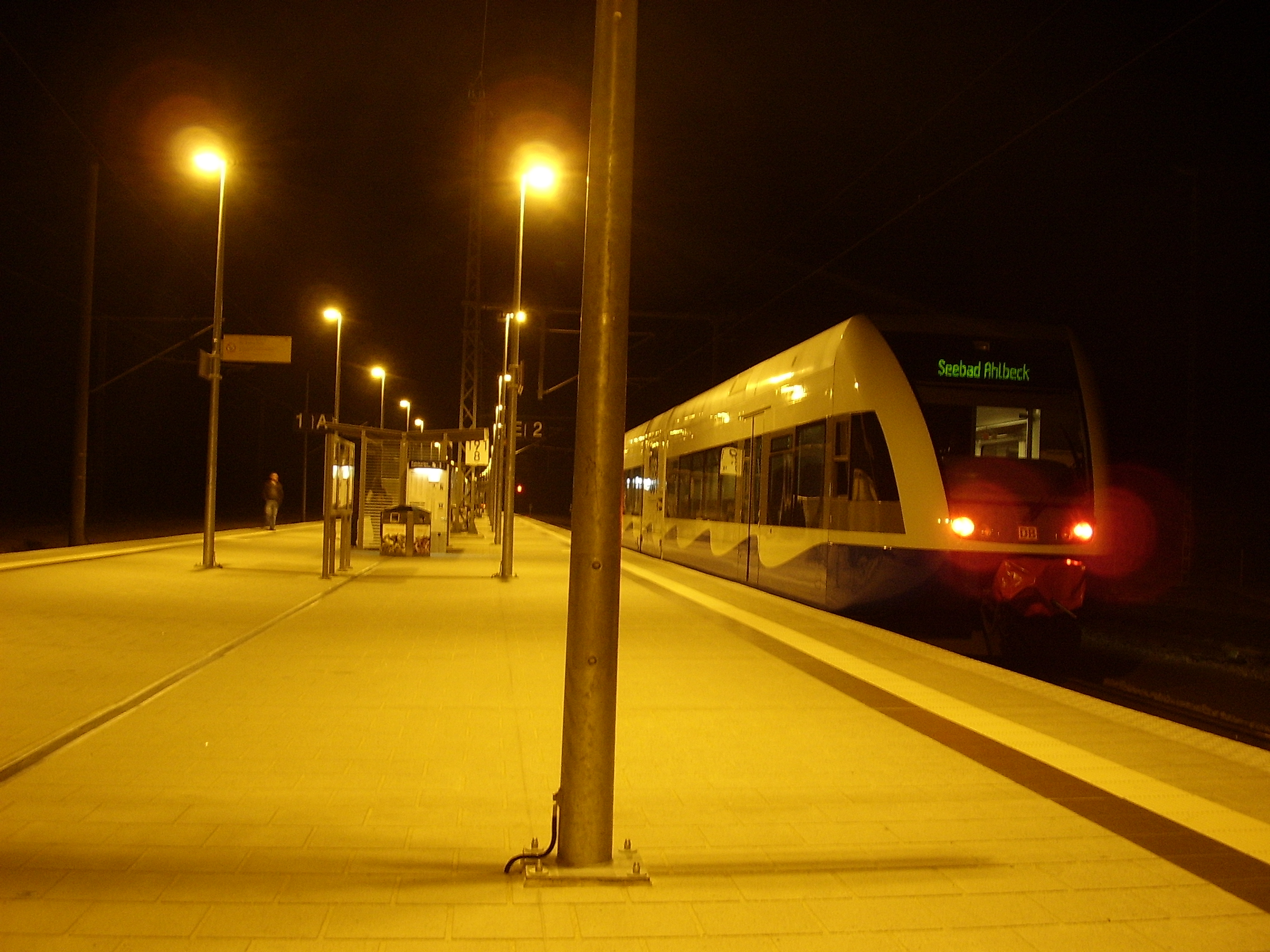
Züssow station

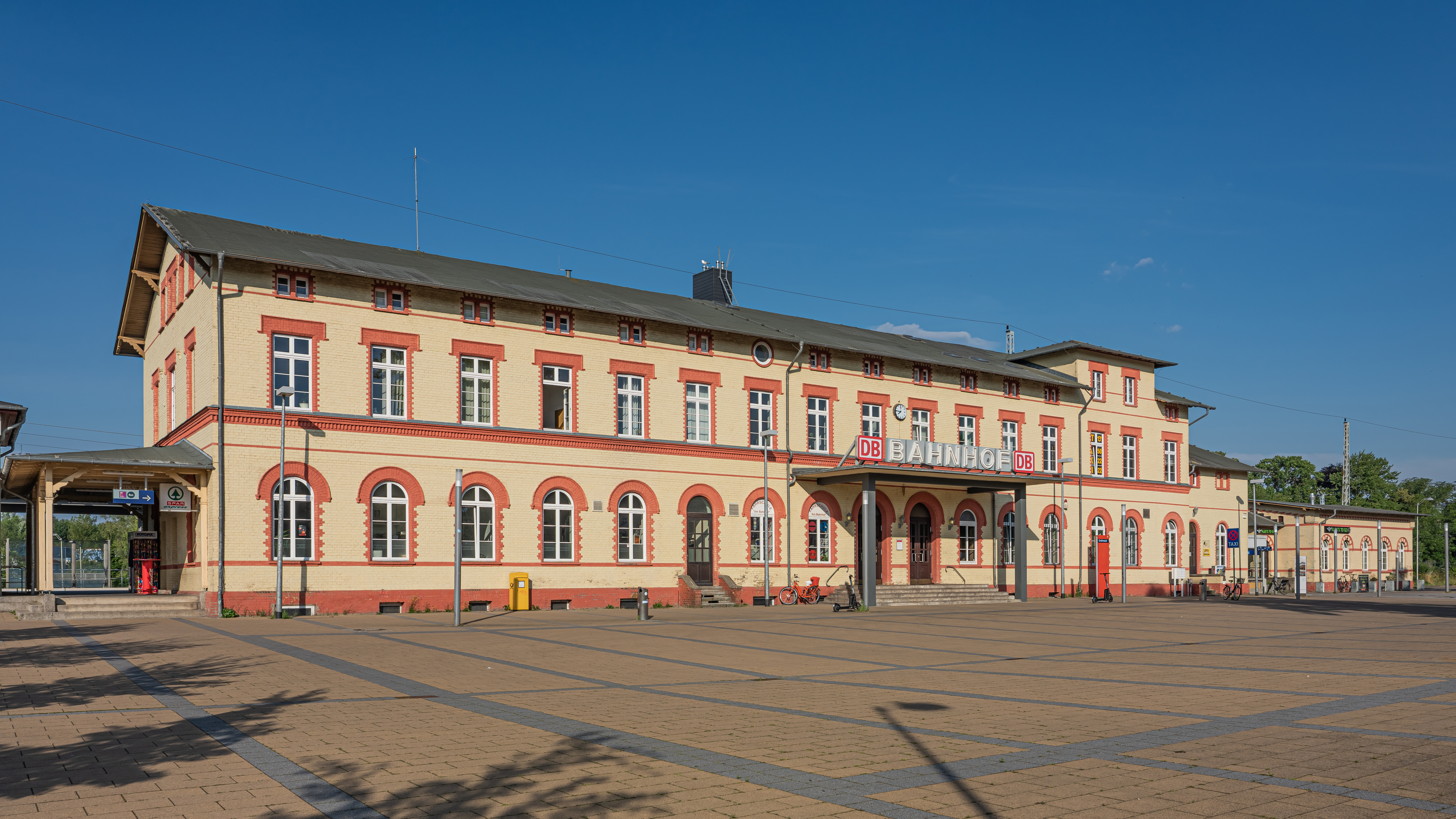
Greifswald station

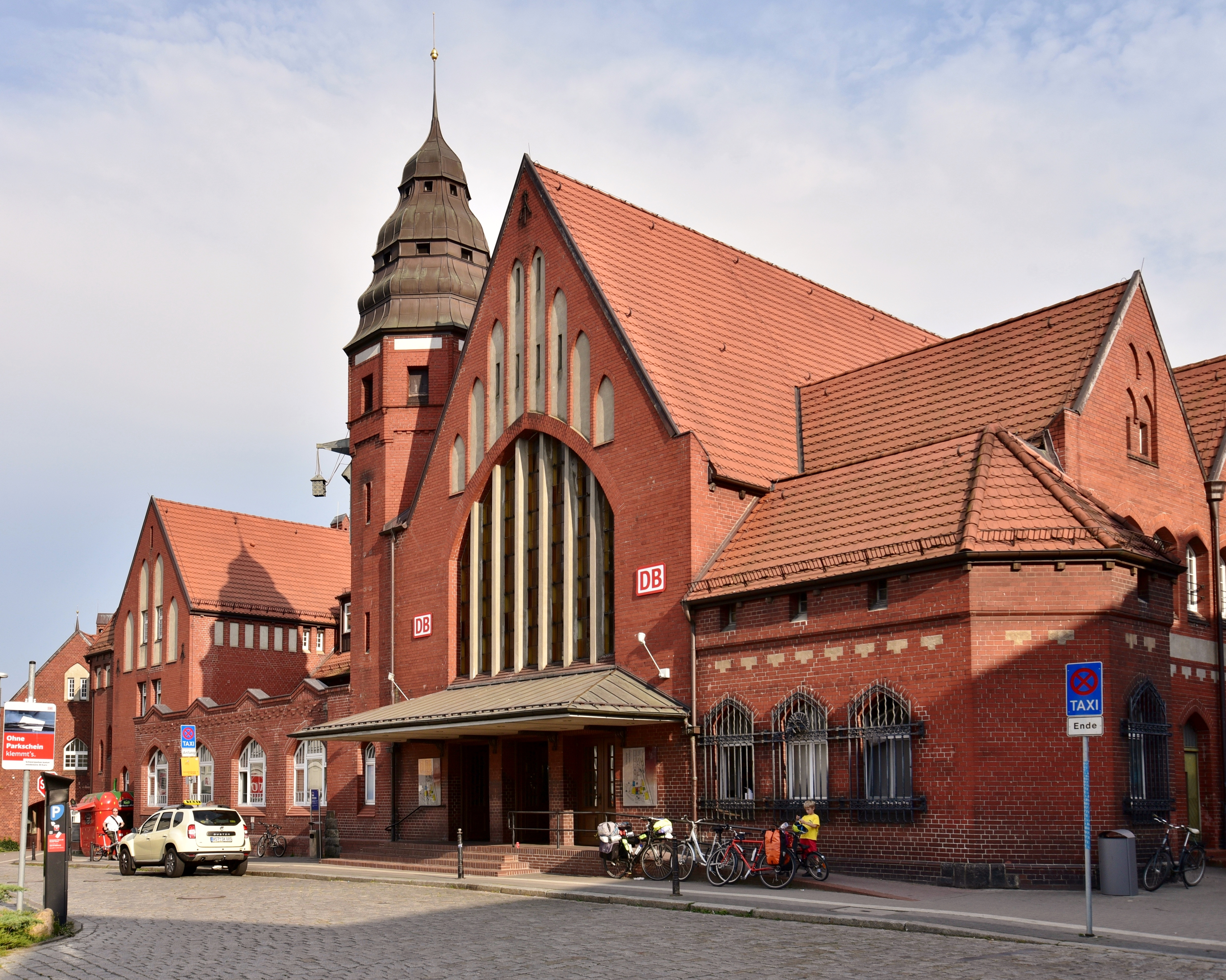
Stralsund Hauptbahnhof
