= Stralsund Hauptbahnhof =

Railway station in Stralsund, Germany

Stralsund Hbf
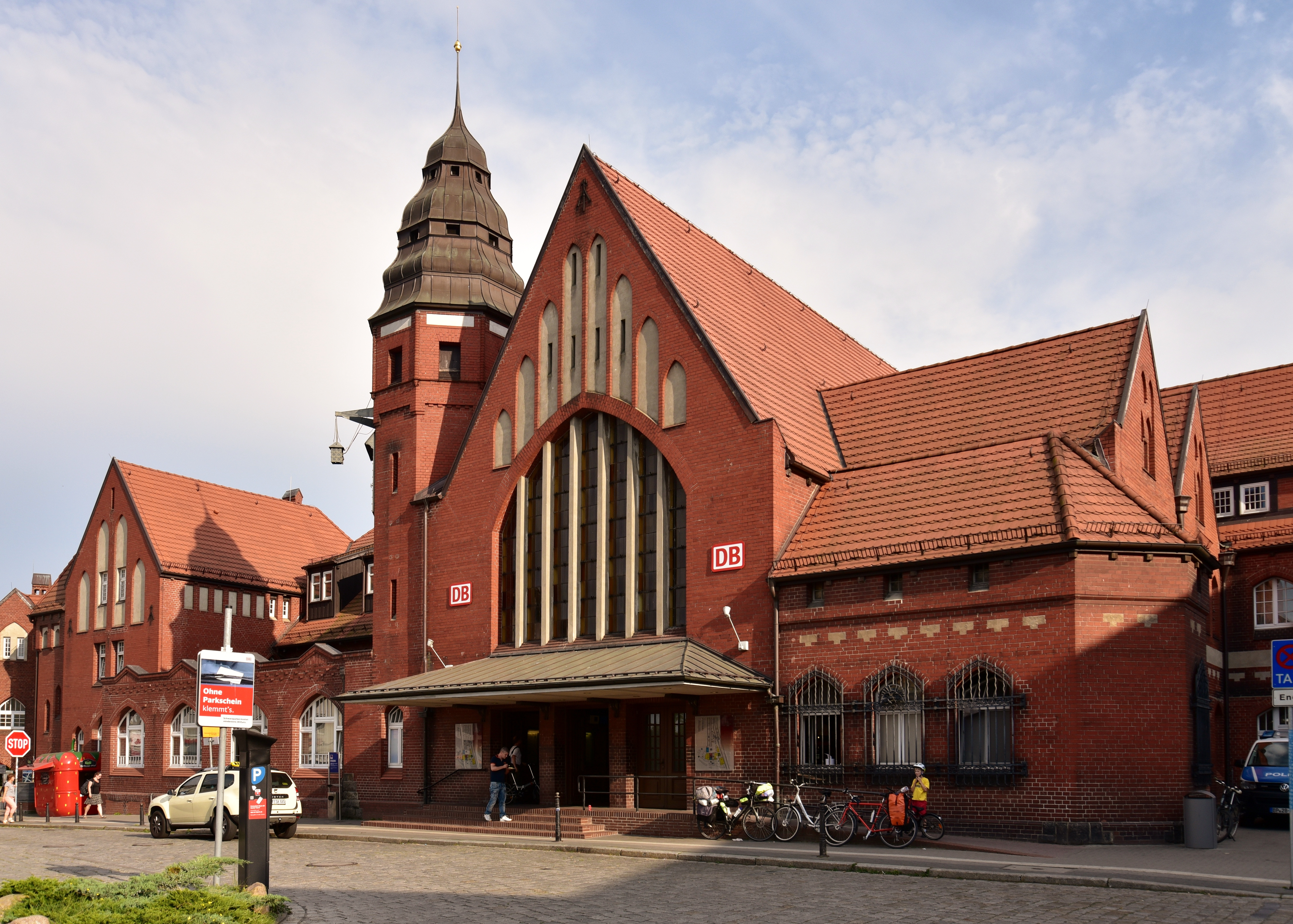
- The station building in 2019

General information
- Location: Tribseer Damm 75, Stralsund, MV; Germany
- Coordinates: 54°18′31″N 13°04′38″E
- Owner: Deutsche Bahn
- Operator: DB Netz; DB Station&Service
- Lines: Rostock–Stralsund (KBS 100, 165); Stralsund–Pasewalk (KBS 192, 193, KBS 203); Stralsund–Bergen (KBS 195); Stralsund–Neubrandenburg (KBS 205)
- Platforms: 3
- Tracks: 6
- Train operators: DB Fernverkehr, DB Regio Nordost, ODEG

Construction
- Accessible: Yes
- Architect: Alexander Rüdell
- Architectural style: Gothic Revival

Other information
- Station code: 6049
- DS100 code: WSR
- IBNR: 8010338
- Category: 3
- Website: www.bahnhof.de

History
- Opened: 1 November 1863; 162 years ago
- Electrified: 17 December 1988; 37 years ago

Key dates
- 1905: Rebuilt 28 March
Services
Preceding station	DB Fernverkehr	Following station
Bergen auf Rügen towards Ostseebad Binz	ICE 15	Reverses direction
Greifswald towards Frankfurt (Main) Hbf or Saarbrücken Hbf	ICE 15	Reverses direction
Bergen auf Rügen towards Ostseebad Binz	ICE 33	Velgast towards Hamburg-Altona
Greifswald Terminus	ICE 33	Velgast towards Hamburg-Altona
Preceding station	DB Regio Nordost	Following station
Miltzow towards Lutherstadt Wittenberg Hbf	RE 3	Terminus
Zarrendorf towards Berlin Südkreuz	RE 5	Terminus
Miltzow towards Greifswald	RE 7	Terminus
Miltzow towards Angermünde	RE 30	Terminus
Zarrendorf towards Neustrelitz Hbf	RE 51	Terminus
Preceding station	Ostdeutsche Eisenbahn	Following station
Stralsund Rügendamm towards Sassnitz or Ostseebad Binz	RE 9	Stralsund-Grünhufe towards Rostock Hbf
Location

Stralsund Hauptbahnhof is the main station in Western Pomerania and the main station for railway lines running to Hamburg, Bergen auf Rügen and Berlin in the German Hanseatic city of Stralsund. It is owned and operated by Deutsche Bahn.

== Station ==
Construction of the present-day station near the centre of the city started on 9 November 1903 and it was inaugurated on 28 March 1905.

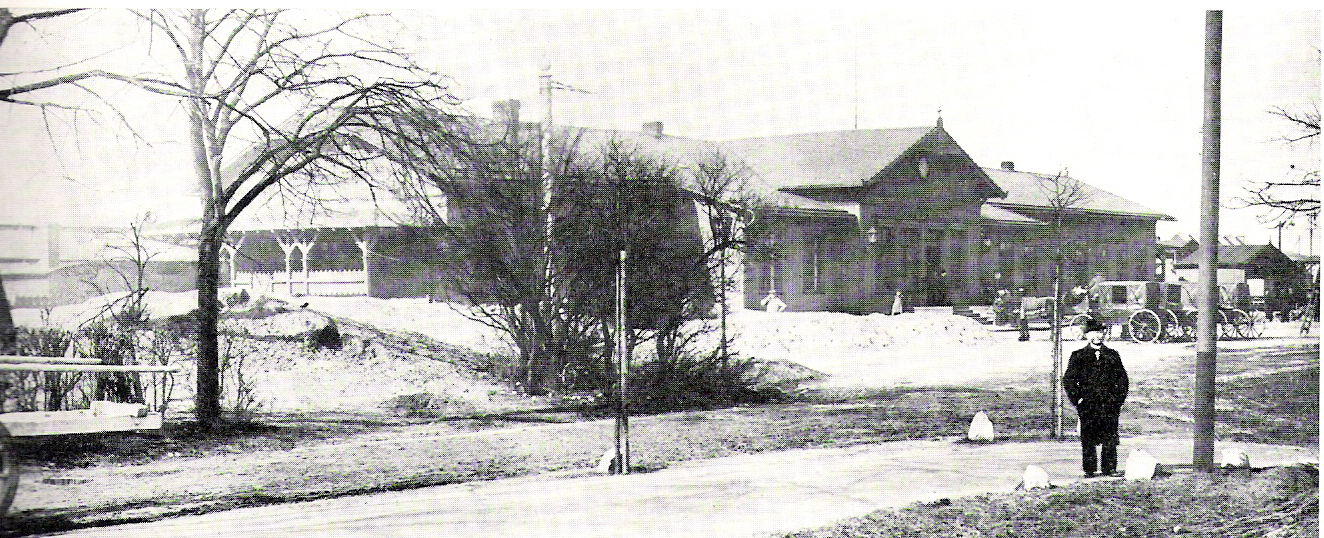
Old station building

Its predecessor was a wooden building constructed in 1863 in the suburb of Tribseer Vorstadt. The construction of this station and the railway to Stralsund had been promoted by the merchants and entrepreneurs of Stralsund since 1844. They joined together in the same year as the "Society for the attainment of a railway from Berlin via Neu-Strelitz to Stralsund" (German: Verein zur Erlangung einer Eisenbahn von Berlin über Neu-Strelitz nach Stralsund) and set out its proposals in a memorandum. They also put this matter before the competent authorities in Berlin. The association developed a concept for the construction of the line and accumulated large financial resources. These efforts, however, always failed at the Prussian Ministry in Berlin and the proposals were refused in the 1840s and 1850s. Finally in 1863 a branch line from Angermünde was built from the Berlin–Stettin line (which had opened in 1843) via Prenzlau, Pasewalk, Anklam and Greifswald to Stralsund. On 26 October 1863 the line reached Stralsund. Due to the nature of Stralsund as a fortress, the station building was built only of wood at the instigation of the Prussian war ministry. In the event of an attack on the city, the building could be destroyed quickly. The building measured about 30 × 10 metres and had two waiting rooms. The platforms were not covered, and passengers had to walk along the tracks to reach the platforms.

Despite its initial success in having the branch from Angermünde built, the Stralsund Society continued to campaign for a direct connection, known as the "Northern Railway". In 1869 a plan was prepared for the laying of a railway line from Berlin to Neustrelitz, Stralsund and Cape Arkona, including a fixed crossing of the Strelasund, which was not realized until 1936. The opening of the Prussian Northern Railway to its terminus at Stralsund was finally celebrated on 1 January 1878, with the arrival of the first train from Berlin.

After the demilitarisation of Stralsund, the call for a new, more modern and higher capacity station became louder. The new station was built of brick and opened to traffic on 29 March 1905. The design for the station building was prepared by the Royal Railway Directorate in Stettin (now Szczecin). The processing of the detailed architectural design and construction management was supervised by Alexander Rüdell, with its implementation handled by Hans Stubbe, who was later a professor at the Braunschweig University of Technology.

A tower next to the hall, which houses a staircase, represents the architecture of the three parishes of greater Stralsund. The entrance hall is 22.12 metres long, 9.90 metres wide and almost 15 metres high. Above the entrance and access to the platforms are large glass facades. Station services were located in the western area of the hall. Three waiting rooms were built in the eastern area: one for ladies only, one for 1st and 2nd class passengers and one for 3rd and 4th class passengers. Access to the six platforms became somewhat easier, although travellers who wished to use the line to Rostock opened in 1888 had to continue to cross the tracks. Only later was a tunnel built. The three platform tracks for trains to and from Rostock are through tracks. The other three platforms (1 - 3) were built as terminal tracks.

The station building was built on the area of a former cattle loading ramp on Tribseer Damm (street). Originally there was an area for the operation of carriages to pick up passengers to depart from the station. Later a tramway and a light railway were opened. Today there is short-term parking and a taxi rank in this area.

On the evening of 28 March 1905 a festival was held to dedicate the new station. This lasted until the early morning hours, with the departure of train No. 206 to Neubrandenburg.

In the 1930s, the Stralsund artist Erich Kliefert received a commission to design the lobby. He placed a large colour display of Stralsund from the air on the western side at the top of the hall and on the eastern side there is a similar representation of the island of Rügen.

In the 1990s the building was refurbished and the area in front of the platforms was covered with a large glass structure. The sanitary facilities were renovated and shops were established in the station.

== Train services ==
In the 2026 timetable the following lines stop at the station:

Line	Route		Frequency
ICE 15	Binz – Stralsund – Berlin – Halle – Erfurt – Frankfurt – Darmstadt – Mannheim – Kaiserslautern – Saarbrücken		Every two hours
ICE 33	Ostseebad Binz –	Stralsund – Rostock – Schwerin – Hamburg (– Hannover – Kassel-Wilhelmshöhe – Gießen – Frankfurt – Karlsruhe/Stuttgart)	4 train pairs
ICE 33	Greifswald –	Stralsund – Rostock – Schwerin – Hamburg (– Hannover – Kassel-Wilhelmshöhe – Gießen – Frankfurt – Karlsruhe/Stuttgart)	1 train pair

=== Regional trains ===
Line	Route	Frequency
RE 3	Stralsund – Züssow – Pasewalk – Angermünde – Erberswalde – Berlin-Gesundbrunnen – Berlin Hbf – Berlin Südkreuz – Ludwigsfelde – Luckenwalde – Jüterbog – Lutherstadt Wittenberg	Every 2 hours
RE 5	Stralsund – Neubrandenburg – Neustrelitz – Oranienburg – Berlin – Berlin Südkreuz	Every 2 hours
RE 7	Stralsund – Miltzow – Greifswald	Every 2 hours
RE 9	Rostock – Ribnitz-Damgarten – Velgast – Stralsund – Bergen auf Rügen – Lietzow – Sassnitz/Ostseebad Binz	Every 2 hours
RE 30	Stralsund – Greifswald – Pasewalk – Prenzlau – Angermünde	Every 2 hours
RE 51	Stralsund – Neubrandenburg – Neustrelitz	Every 2 hours

== Gallery ==
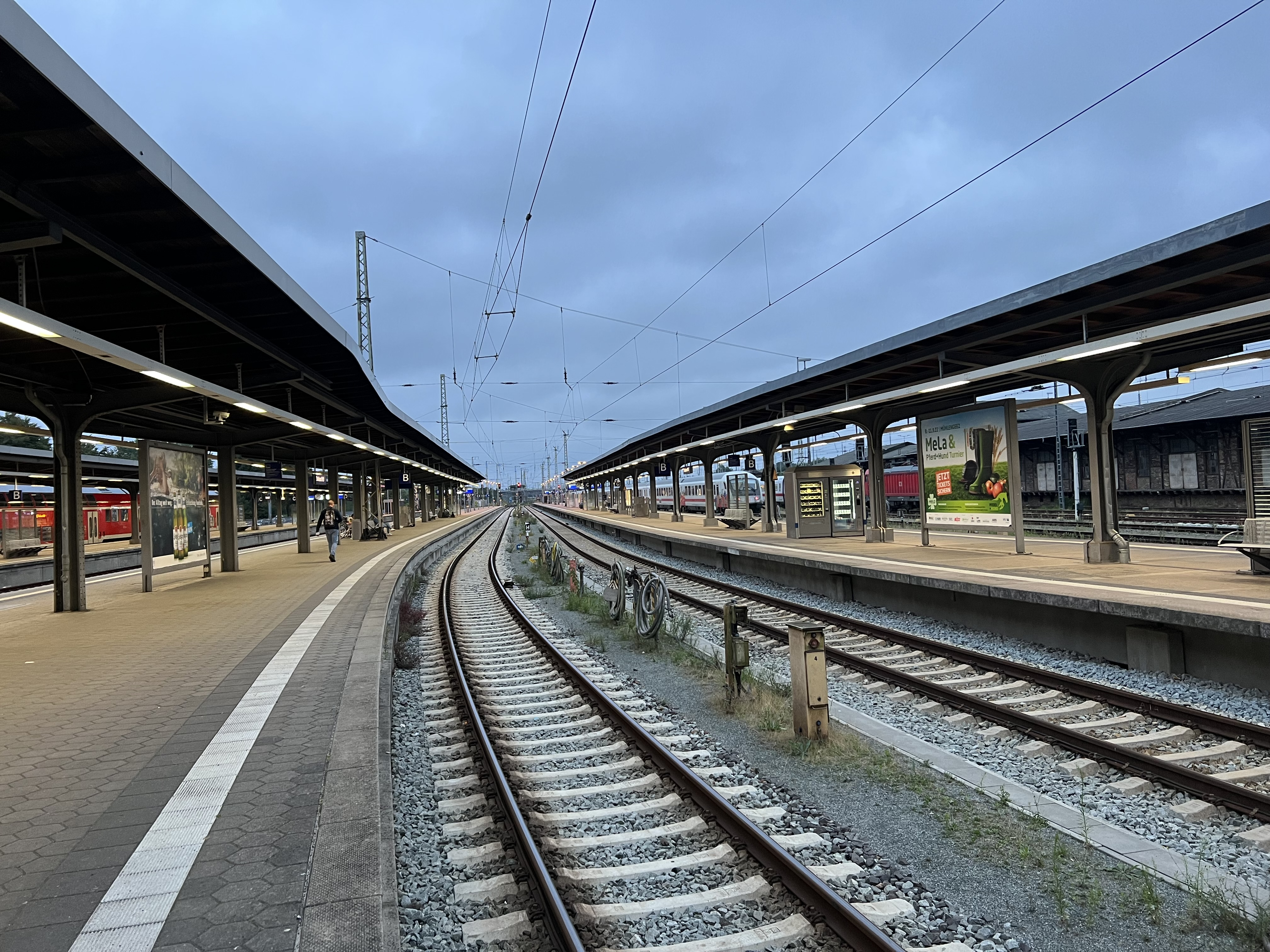
Platforms

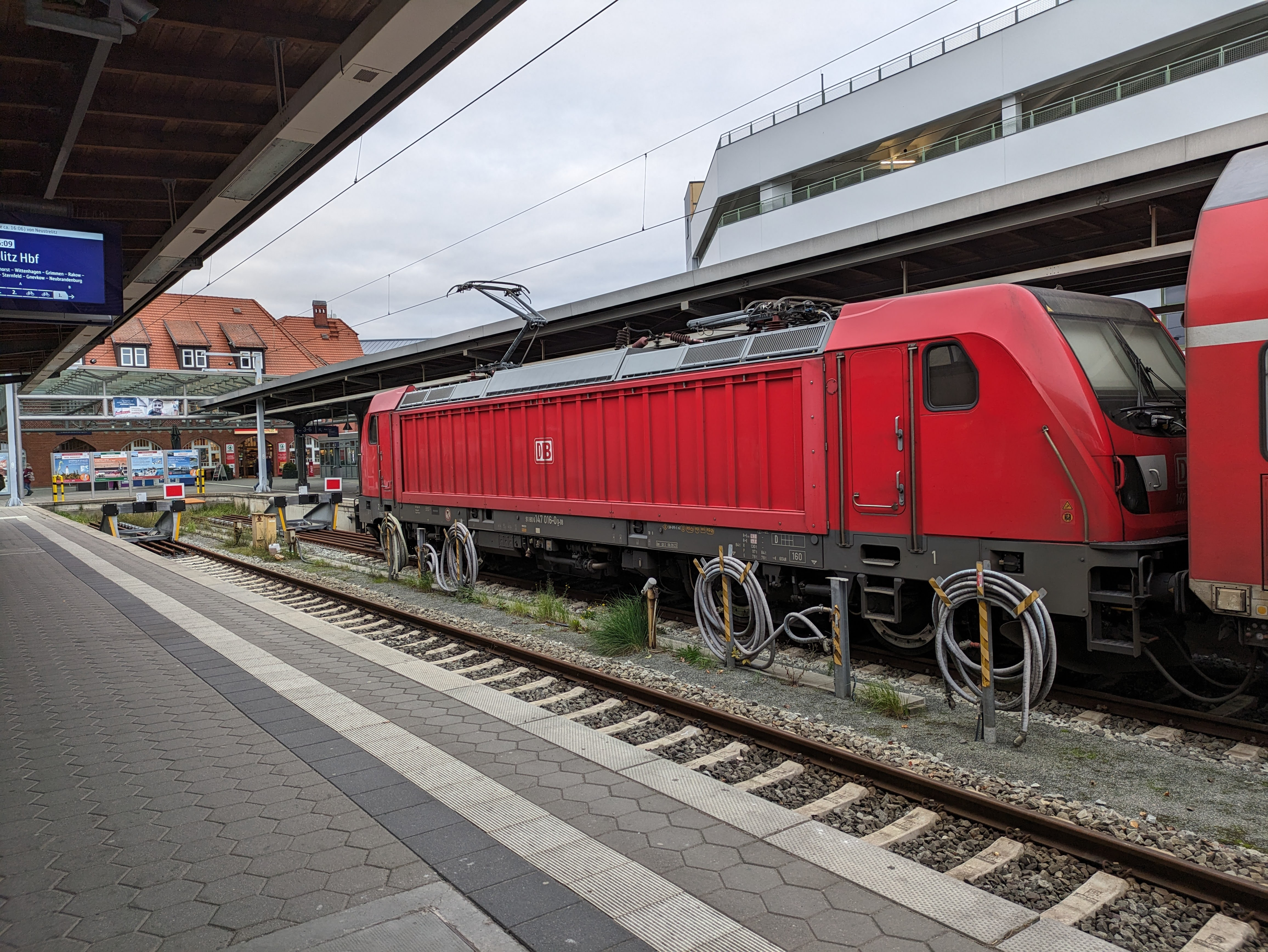
Class 147 in Stralsund Hauptbahnhof

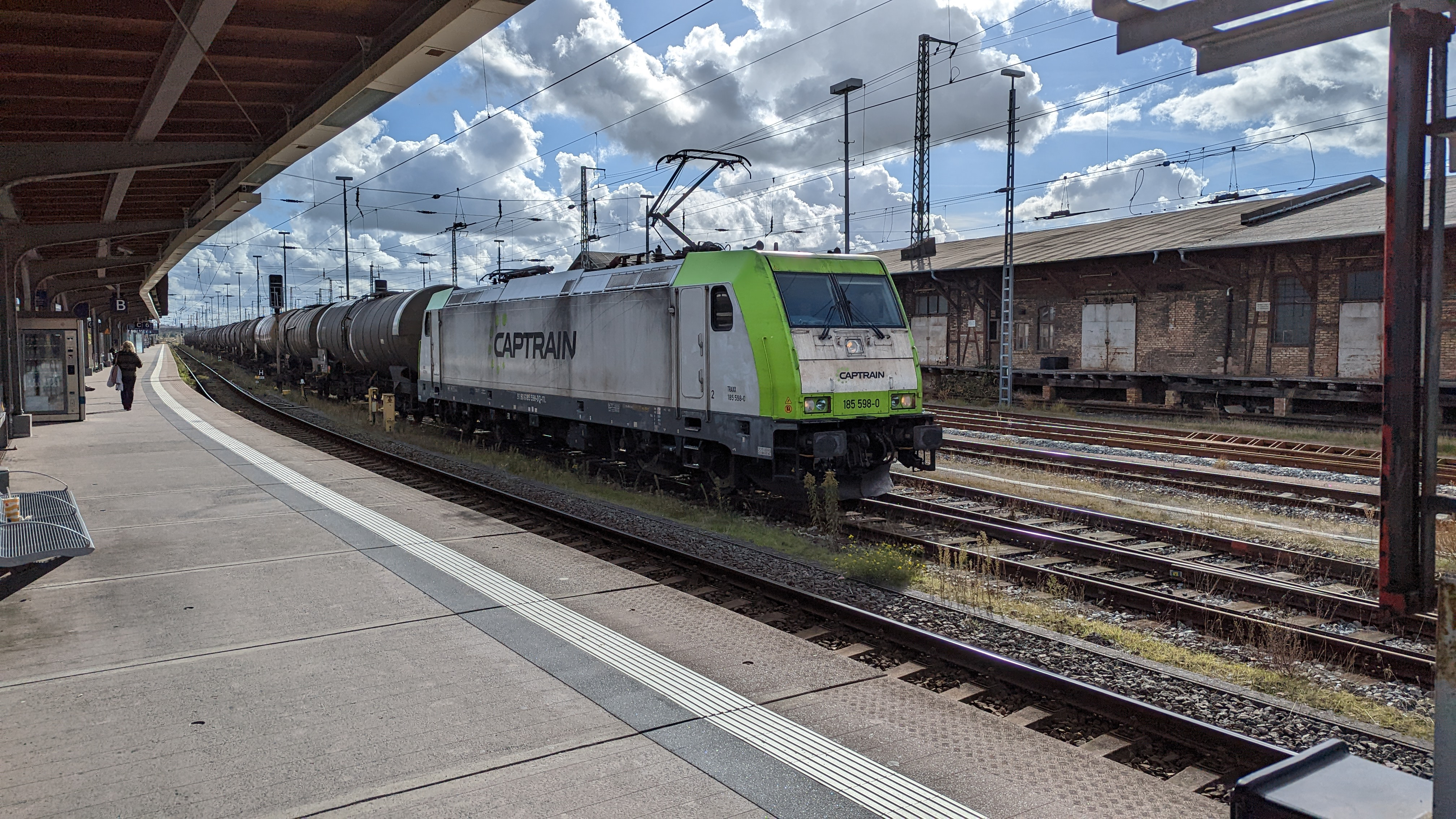
Cargo train at Stralsund

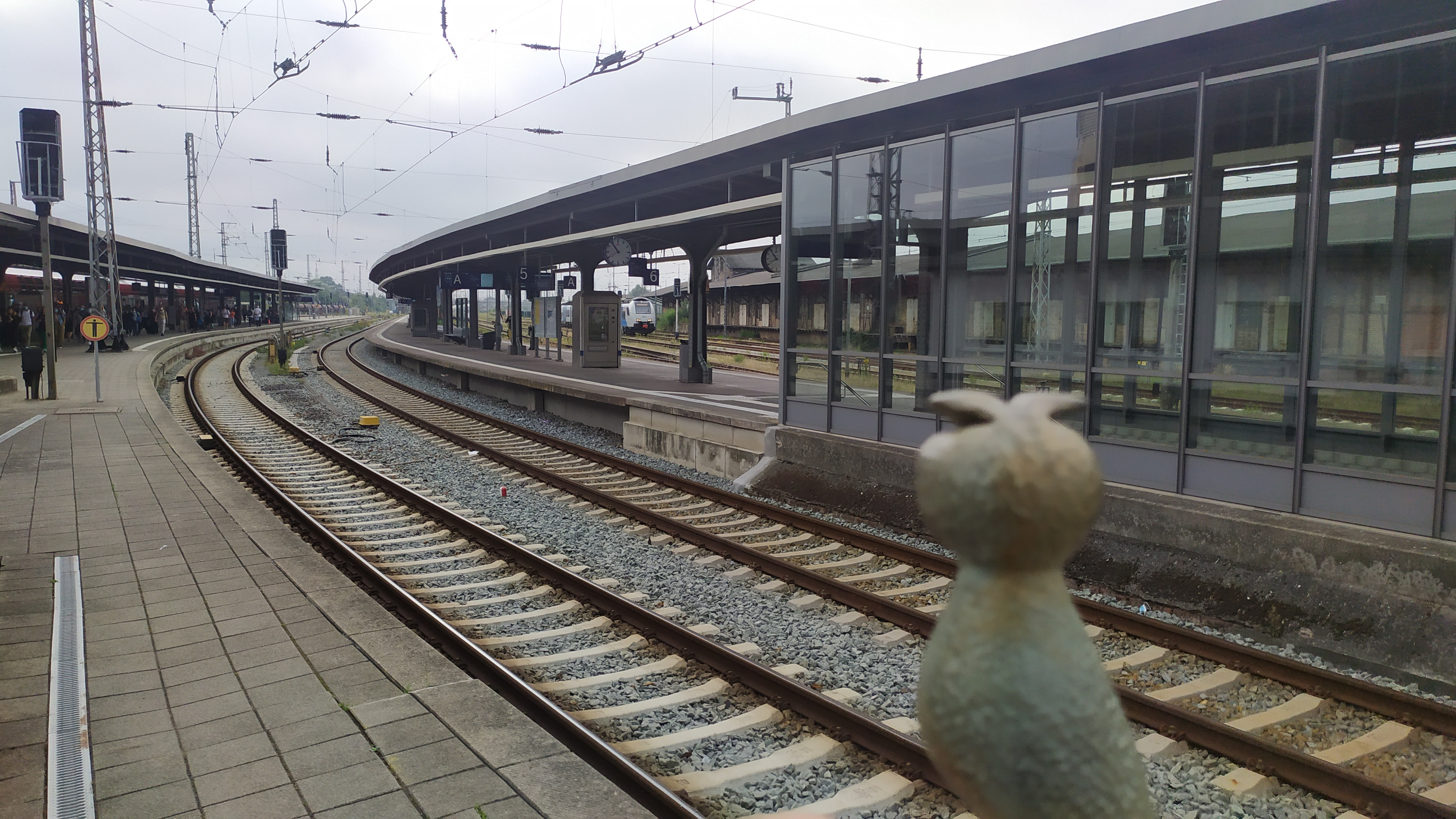
Platforms 4, 5 and 6

== See also ==
- Rail transport in Germany
- Railway stations in Germany
