= Prenzlau station =

Railway station in Germany

Prenzlau
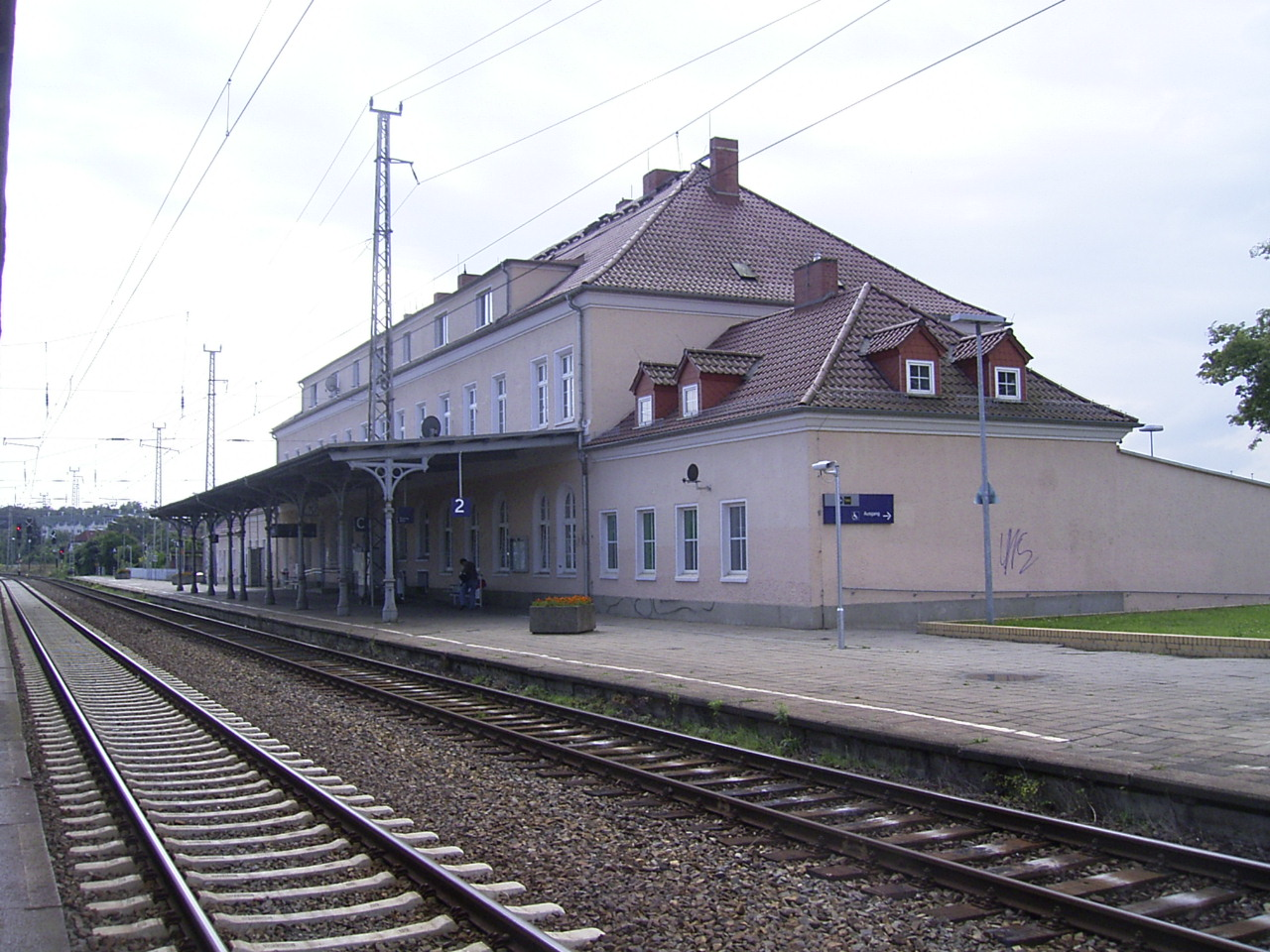
- Prenzlau railway station

General information
- Location: Prenzlau, Brandenburg, Germany
- Coordinates: 53°19′19″N 13°52′02″E
- Owner: Deutsche Bahn
- Operator: DB Station&Service
- Line: Angermünde–Stralsund railway
- Platforms: 3
- Tracks: 5
- Connections: 401 403 411 413 414 416 419 421 425 427 428 431 432 435 441 445 448 502 503

Construction
- Accessible: Yes

Other information
- Fare zone: VBB: 3762
- Website: www.bahnhof.de

History
- Opened: 16 March 1863

Services
Preceding station	DB Fernverkehr	Following station
Pasewalk towards Ostseebad Binz	ICE 15	Eberswalde Hbf towards Saarbrücken Hbf
Preceding station	DB Regio Nordost	Following station
Nechlin towards Stralsund Hbf	RE 3	Seehausen (Uckermark) towards Jüterbog or Lutherstadt Wittenberg Hbf
Pasewalk towards Stralsund Hbf	RE 30	Angermünde Terminus
Location

Prenzlau (German: Bahnhof Prenzlau) is a railway station in the town of Prenzlau, Brandenburg, Germany. The station lies on the Angermünde–Stralsund railway and the train services are operated by Deutsche Bahn and Niederbarnimer Eisenbahn (NEB).

== Rail services ==
In the 2026 timetable the following lines stop at the station:

Line	Route	Frequency (min)	Operator
ICE 15	Saarbrücken – Kaiserslautern – Mannheim – Darmstadt – Frankfurt – Erfurt – Halle – Berlin – Prenzlau – Stralsund – Binz	Four times a day	
RE 3	Stralsund – Greifswald – Prenzlau – Angermünde – Eberswalde – Berlin – Ludwigsfelde – Jüterbog (– Lutherstadt Wittenberg)	120	DB Regio Nordost
RE 30	Stralsund – Greifswald – Pasewalk – Prenzlau – Angermünde	120	DB Regio Nordost
