= Pinnow station =

Railway station in Pinnow, Germany

Pinnow
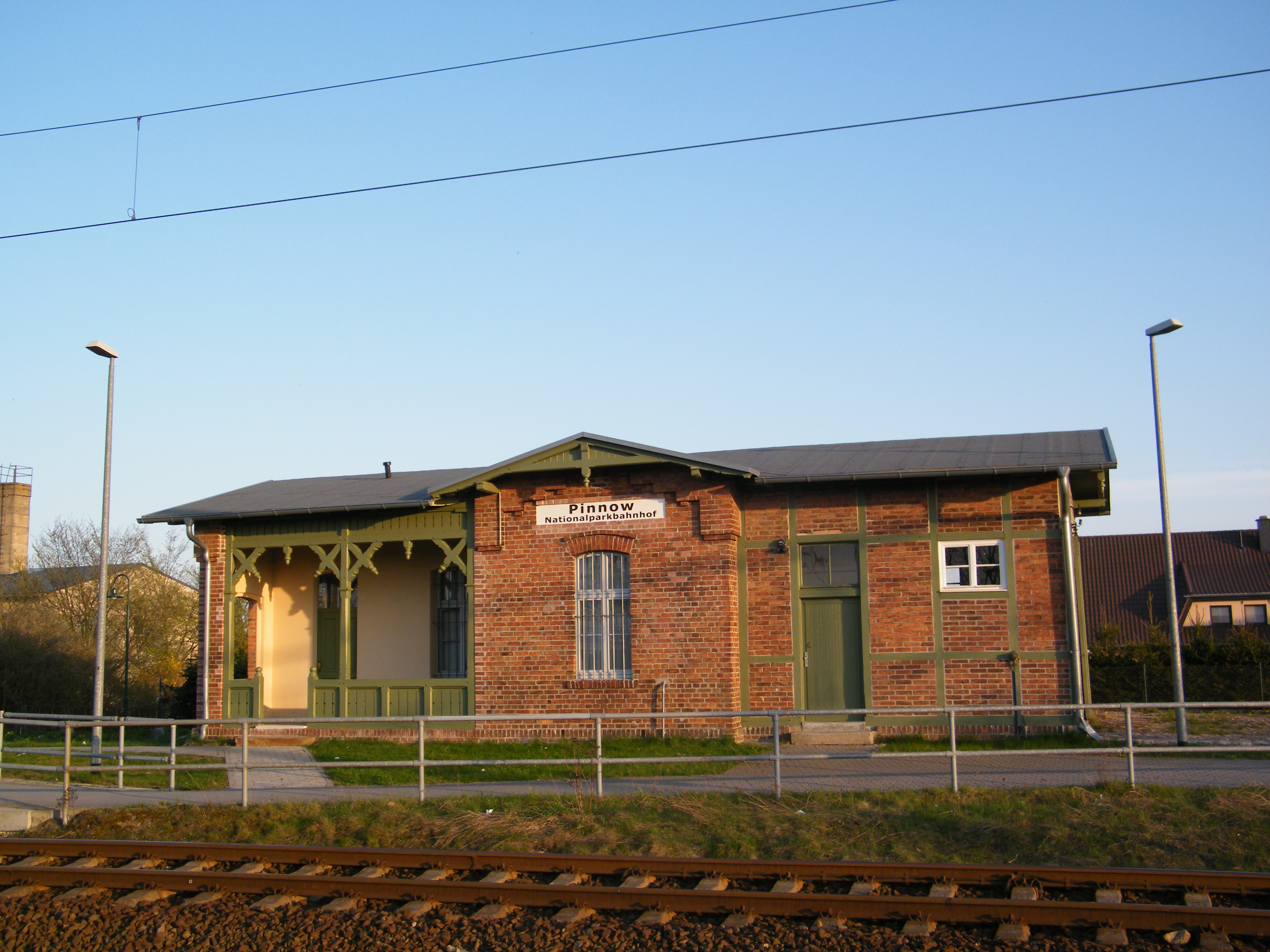
- Pinnow railway station

General information
- Location: Pinnow, Brandenburg, Germany
- Coordinates: 53°03′55″N 14°05′21″E
- Owner: Deutsche Bahn
- Operator: DB Station&Service
- Line: Angermünde-Schwedt railway
- Platforms: 1
- Tracks: 2

Other information
- Fare zone: VBB: 4266

History
- Opened: 1888

Services
Preceding station	DB Regio Nordost	Following station
Angermünde towards Jüterbog or Lutherstadt Wittenberg Hbf	RE 3	Schwedt Mitte towards Schwedt
Preceding station	Niederbarnimer Eisenbahn	Following station
Angermünde Terminus	RB 61	Schwedt Mitte towards Schwedt
Location
- Location within Brandenburg Location within Germany Location within Europe

Pinnow (German: Bahnhof Pinnow) is a railway station in the town of Pinnow, Brandenburg, Germany. The station lies of the Angermünde-Schwedt railway and the train services are operated by Deutsche Bahn and Niederbarnimer Eisenbahn.

== Train services ==
The station is served by the following service(s):

- Regional services RE 3 Schwedt - Angermünde - Berlin - Ludwigsfelde - Jüterbog - Lutherstadt Wittenberg
- Local services RB 61 Schwedt - Angermünde
