= Trebbin station =

Railway station in Trebbin, Germany

Trebbin
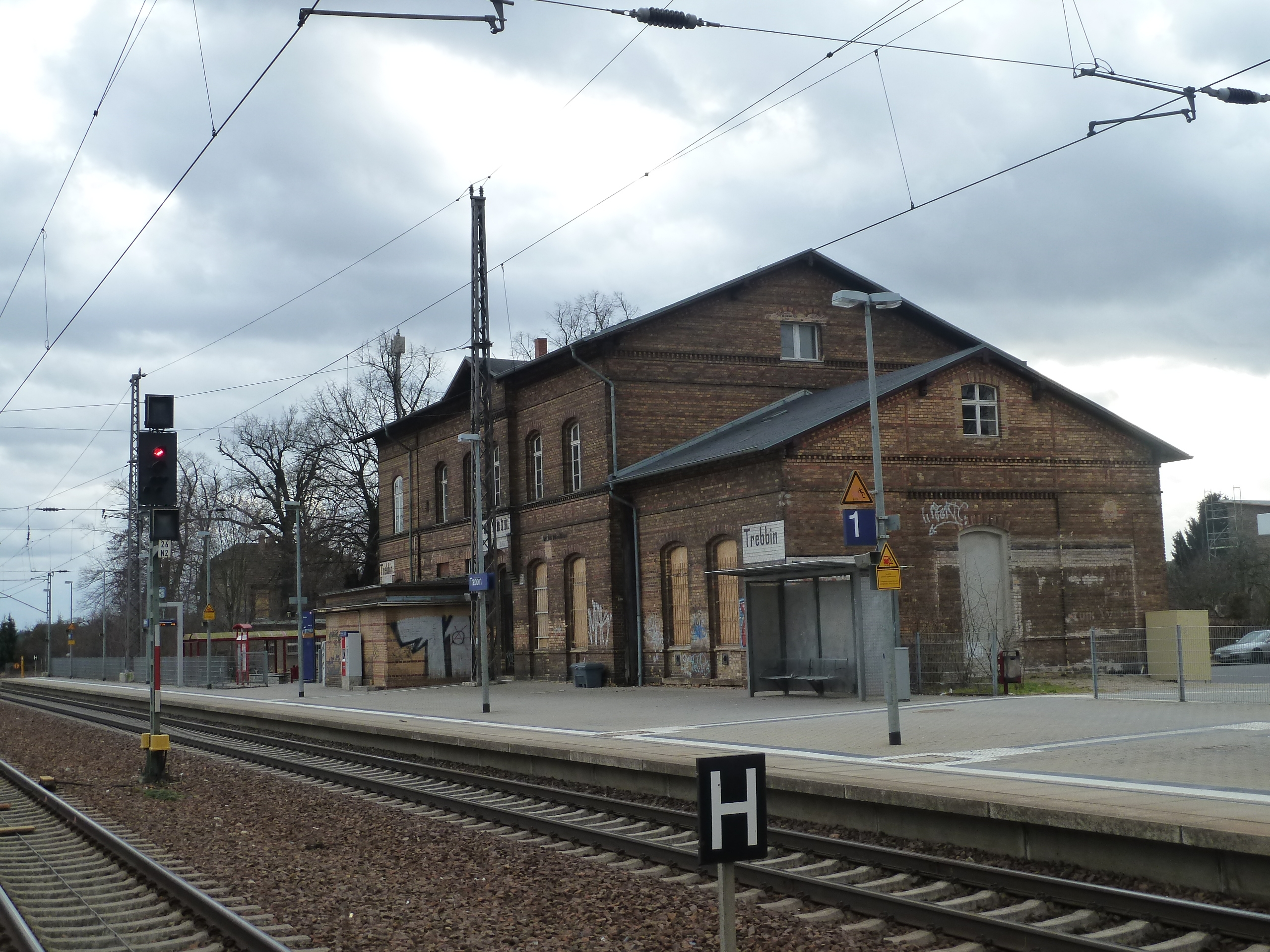
- 2012

General information
- Location: Am Bahnhof 2; 14959 Trebbin; Brandenburg; Germany
- Coordinates: 52.2166°N 13.2294°E
- Elevation: 39 m (128 ft)
- System: Bf
- Owner: DB Netz
- Operator: DB Station&Service
- Lines: Berlin–Halle railway (KBS 250)
- Platforms: 1 island platform 1 side platform
- Tracks: 3
- Train operators: DB Regio Nordost

Other information
- Station code: 6242
- DS100 code: BTN
- IBNR: 8013137
- Category: 5
- Fare zone: VBB: 6253
- Website: www.bahnhof.de

Services
Preceding station	DB Regio Nordost	Following station
Thyrow towards Stralsund Hbf or Schwedt	RE 3	Woltersdorf (Nuthe-Urstromtal) towards Jüterbog or Lutherstadt Wittenberg Hbf
Location
- Location within Brandenburg Location within Germany Location within Europe

Trebbin station is a railway station in the municipality of Trebbin, located in the Teltow-Fläming district in Brandenburg, Germany.
