= Britz station =

Railway station in Brandenburg, Germany

Britz
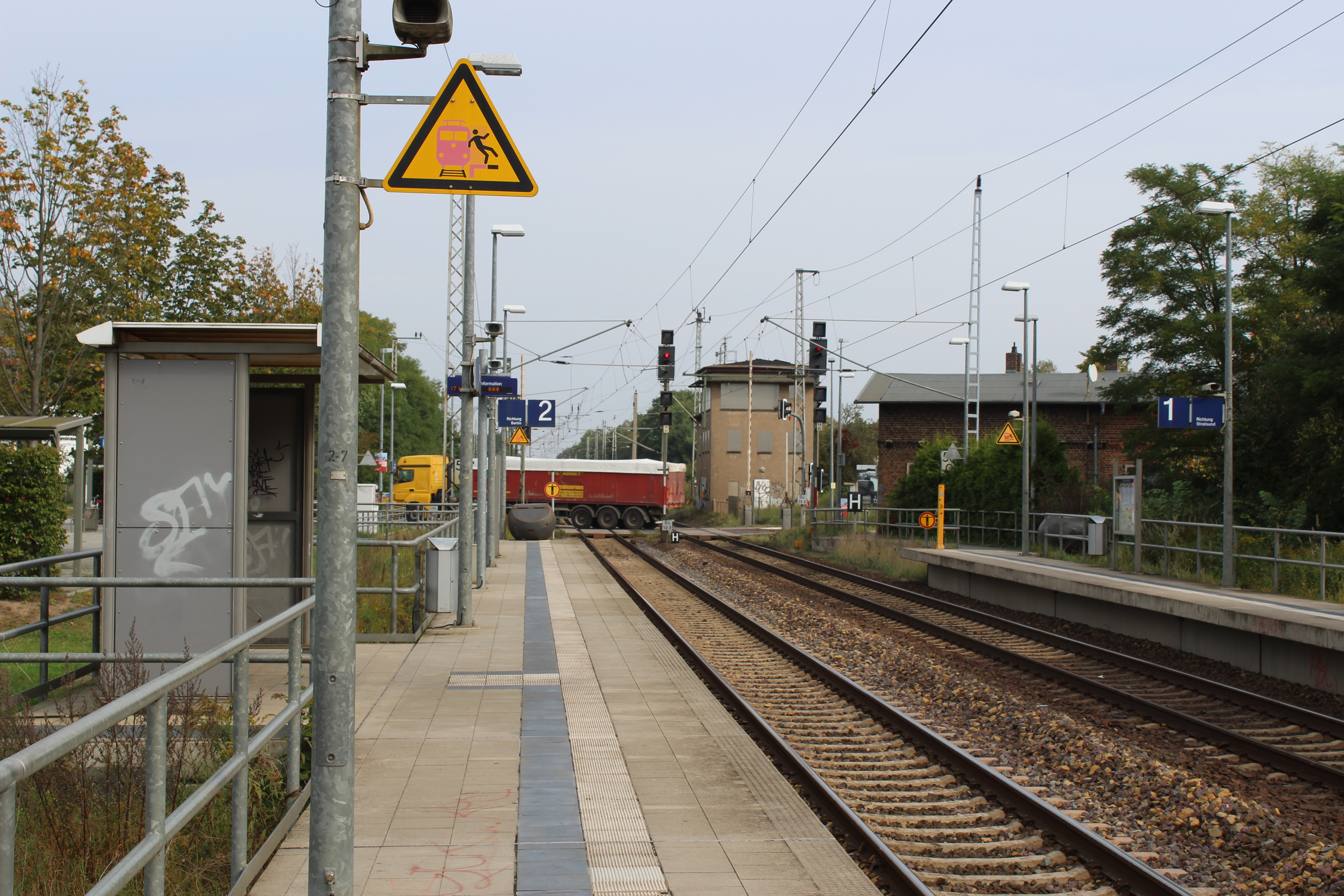
- Britz railway station (2017)

General information
- Location: Britz, Brandenburg, Germany
- Coordinates: 52°52′22″N 13°49′14″E
- Owner: DB Netz
- Operator: DB Station&Service
- Line: Berlin–Szczecin railway
- Platforms: 2 side platforms
- Tracks: 2

Other information
- Station code: 889
- DS100 code: WBR
- IBNR: 8010064
- Category: 6
- Fare zone: VBB: 4762
- Website: www.bahnhof.de

History
- Opened: February 1875

Services
Preceding station	DB Regio Nordost	Following station
Eberswalde Hbf towards Jüterbog or Lutherstadt Wittenberg Hbf	RE 3	Chorin towards Stralsund Hbf or Schwedt
Preceding station	Niederbarnimer Eisenbahn	Following station
Golzow (bei Eberswalde) towards Templin Stadt	RB 63	Eberswalde Hbf Terminus
Location
- Location within Brandenburg

Britz (German: Bahnhof Britz) is a railway station in the town of Britz, Brandenburg, Germany. The station lies of the Berlin–Szczecin railway and the train services are operated by Deutsche Bahn and Niederbarnimer Eisenbahn.

== Train services ==
The station is served by the following services:

- Regional services RE 3 Stralsund - Greifswald - Pasewalk - Angermünde - Berlin - Ludwigsfelde - Jüterbog - Falkenberg - Elsterwerda
- Regional services RE 3 Schwedt - Angermünde - Berlin - Ludwigsfelde - Jüterbog - Lutherstadt Wittenberg
- Local services RB 63 Eberswalde - Joachimsthal
