= Thyrow station =

Railway station in Brandenburg, Germany

Thyrow
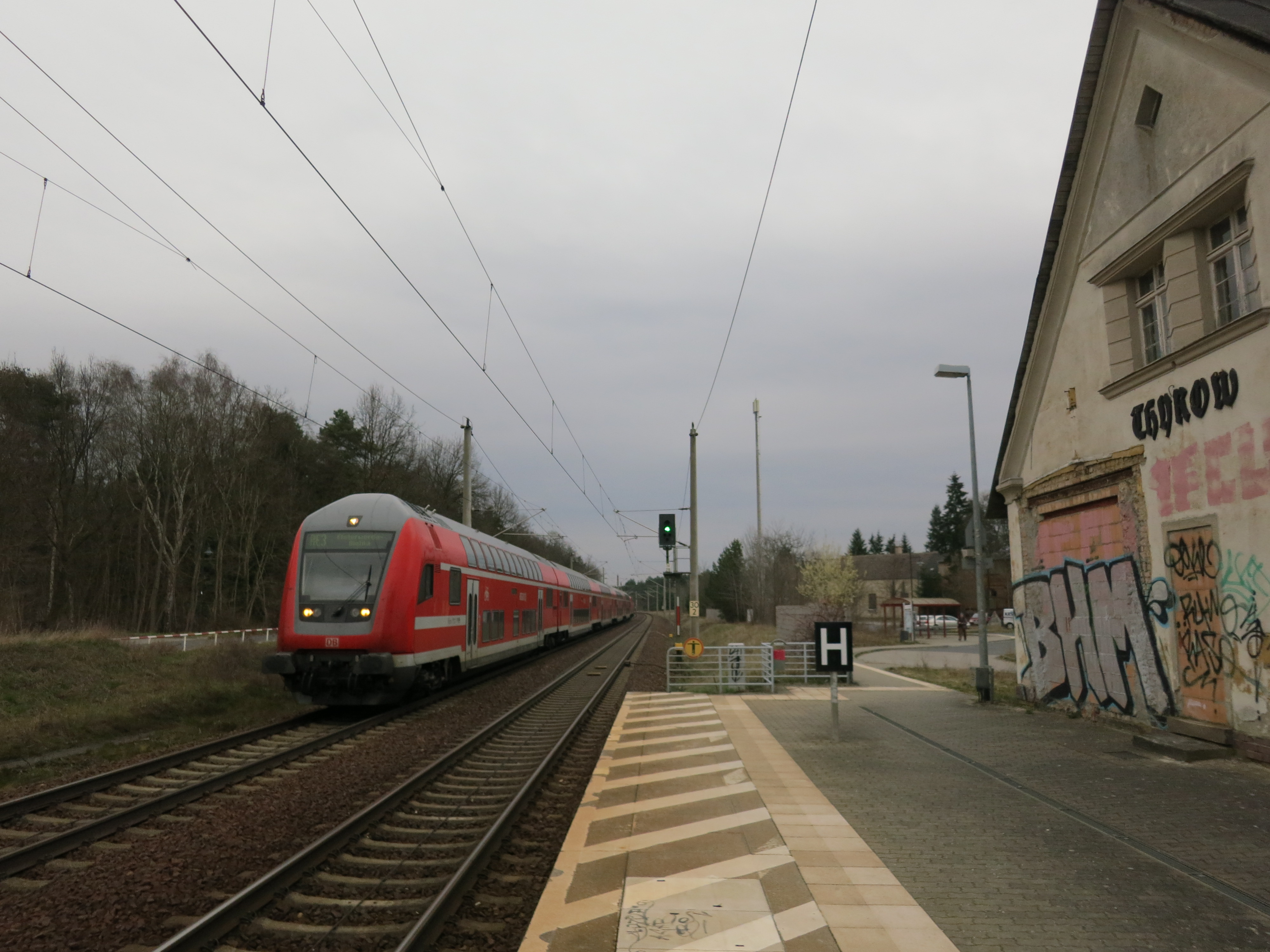
- 2016

General information
- Location: Thyrower Bahnhofstraße; 14959 Trebbin; Brandenburg; Germany
- Coordinates: 52.2472°N 13.2601°E
- System: Bf
- Owner: DB Netz
- Operator: DB Station&Service
- Lines: Berlin–Halle railway (KBS 250)
- Platforms: 2 side platforms
- Tracks: 2
- Train operators: DB Regio Nordost

Other information
- Station code: 6208
- DS100 code: BTHR
- IBNR: 8013123
- Category: 6
- Fare zone: VBB: Berlin C/6153
- Website: www.bahnhof.de

Services
Preceding station	DB Regio Nordost	Following station
Ludwigsfelde towards Stralsund Hbf or Schwedt	RE 3	Trebbin towards Jüterbog or Lutherstadt Wittenberg Hbf
Location
- Location within Brandenburg Location within Germany Location within Europe

Thyrow station is a railway station in the Thyrow district of the municipality of Trebbin, located in the Teltow-Fläming district in Brandenburg, Germany.
