= Schwedt Mitte station =

Railway station in Schwedt/Oder, Germany

Schwedt (Oder) Mitte
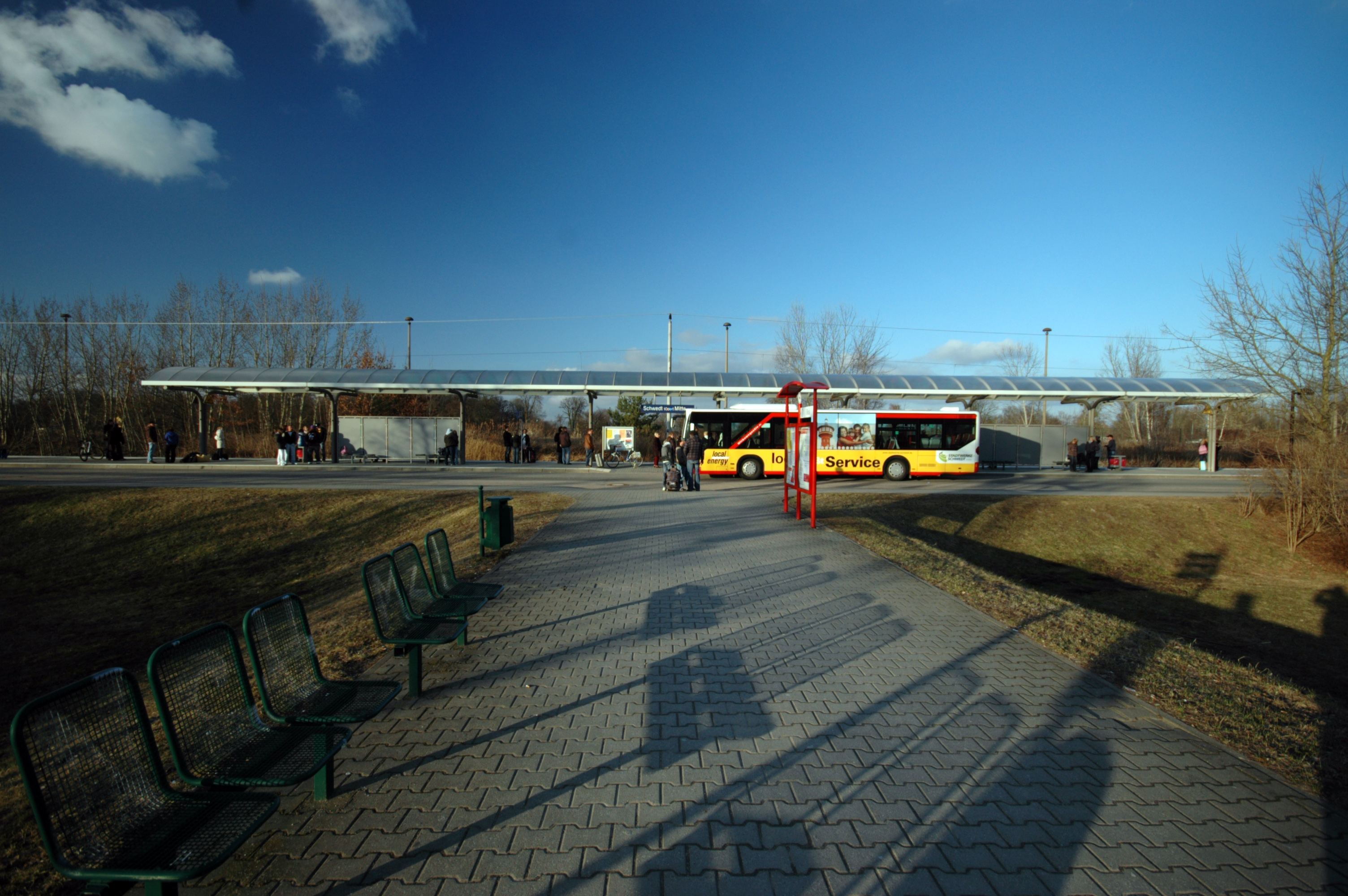
- Schwedt Mitte railway station

General information
- Location: Schwedt, Brandenburg, Germany
- Coordinates: 53°04′05″N 14°16′18″E
- Owner: Deutsche Bahn
- Operator: DB Station&Service
- Line: Angermünde-Schwedt railway
- Platforms: 1
- Tracks: 1

Other information
- Fare zone: VBB: 4369

History
- Opened: 21 November 1997

Services
Preceding station	DB Regio Nordost	Following station
Pinnow towards Jüterbog or Lutherstadt Wittenberg Hbf	RE 3	Schwedt Terminus
Preceding station	Niederbarnimer Eisenbahn	Following station
Pinnow towards Angermünde	RB 61	Schwedt Terminus
Location
- Location within Brandenburg Location within Germany Location within Europe

Schwedt Mitte (German: Bahnhof Schwedt Mitte) is a railway station in the city of Schwedt, Brandenburg, Germany. The station lies of the Angermünde-Schwedt railway and the train services are operated by Deutsche Bahn and Niederbarnimer Eisenbahn.

== Train services ==
The station is served by the following service(s):

- Regional services RE 3 Schwedt - Angermünde - Berlin - Ludwigsfelde - Jüterbog - Lutherstadt Wittenberg
- Local services RB 61 Schwedt - Angermünde
