= Chorin station =

Railway station in Chorin, Brandenberg, Germany

Chorin
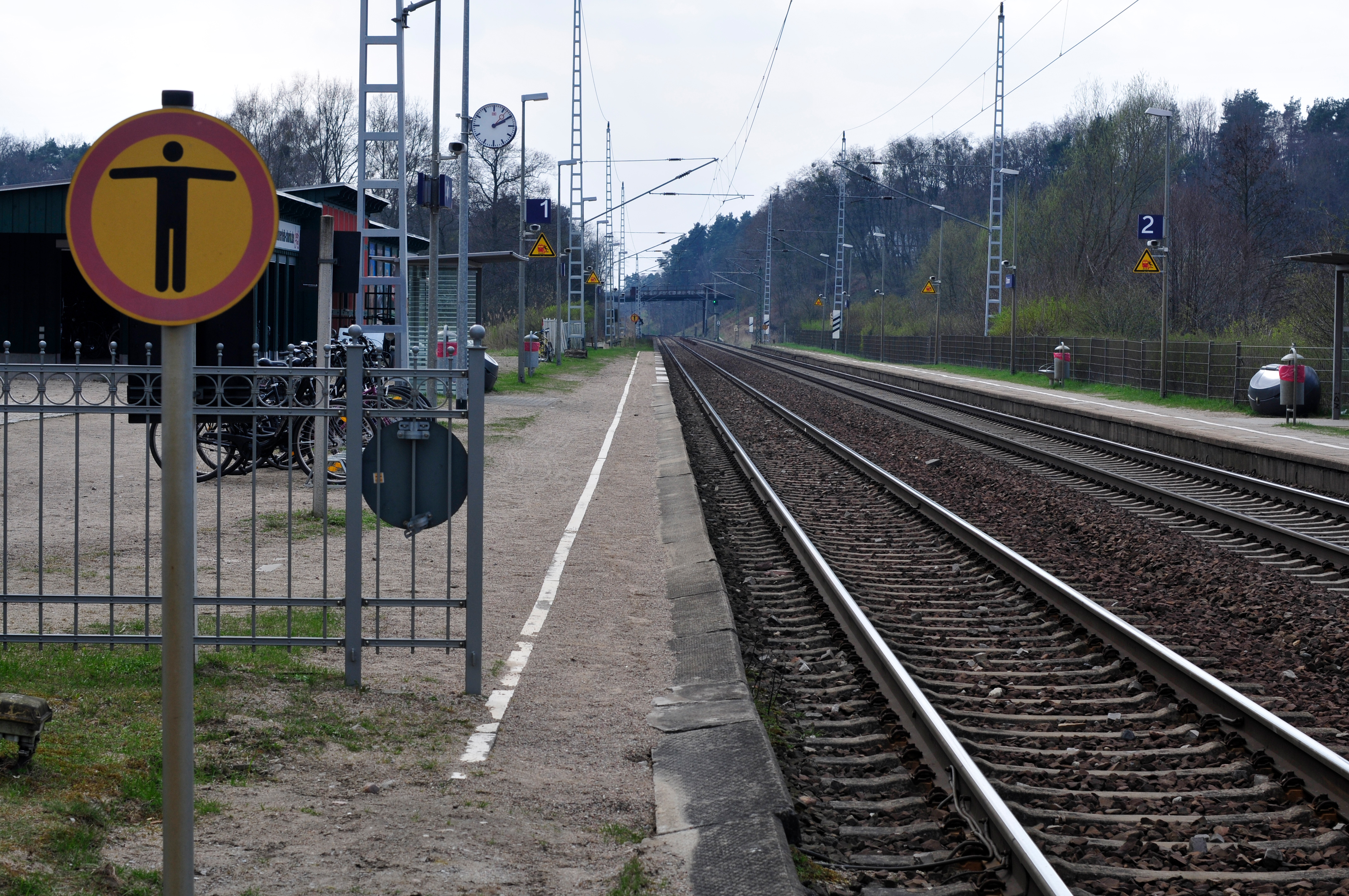
- Chorin railway station

General information
- Location: Chorin, Brandenburg, Germany
- Coordinates: 52°54′13″N 13°52′13″E
- Owner: DB Netz
- Operator: DB Station&Service
- Line: Berlin–Szczecin railway
- Platforms: 2
- Tracks: 2

Other information
- Fare zone: VBB: 4663

History
- Opened: 1 September 1902

Services
Preceding station	DB Regio Nordost	Following station
Britz towards Jüterbog or Lutherstadt Wittenberg Hbf	RE 3	Angermünde towards Stralsund Hbf or Schwedt
Location
- Location within Brandenburg Location within Germany Location within Europe

Chorin (German: Bahnhof Chorin) is a railway station in the village of Chorin, Brandenburg, Germany. The station lies of the Berlin–Szczecin railway and the train services are operated by Deutsche Bahn.

== Train services ==
The station is served by the following service(s):

- Regional services RE 3 Stralsund - Greifswald - Pasewalk - Angermünde - Berlin - Ludwigsfelde - Jüterbog - Falkenberg - Elsterwerda
- Regional services RE 3 Schwedt - Angermünde - Berlin - Ludwigsfelde - Jüterbog - Lutherstadt Wittenberg
