= Woltersdorf (Nuthe-Urstromtal) station =

Railway station in Nuthe-Urstromtal, Germany

Woltersdorf (Nuthe-Urstromtal)
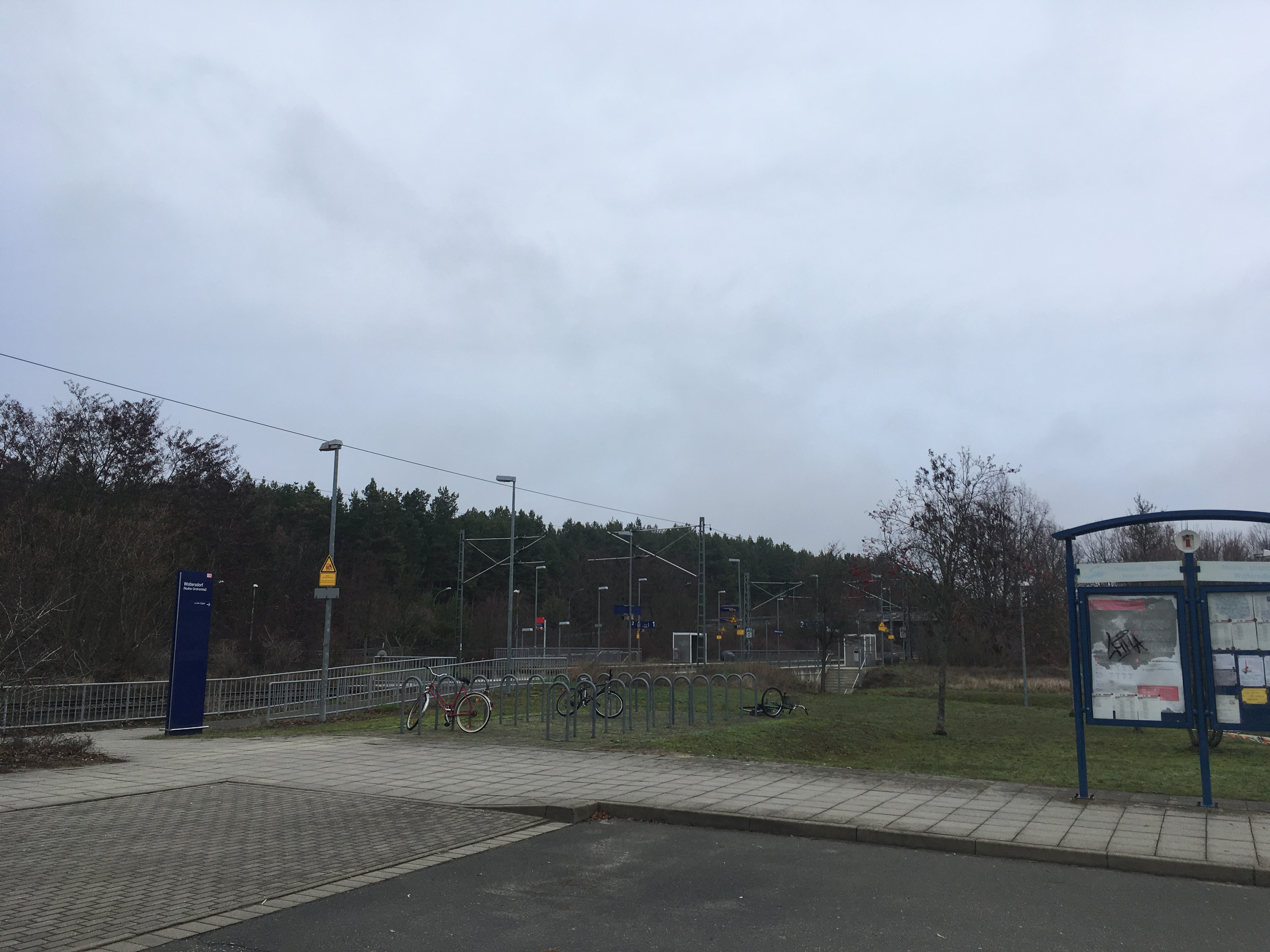
- 2018

General information
- Location: Anhaltstraße/Bahnhofstraße; 14947 Nuthe-Urstromtal; Brandenburg; Germany
- Coordinates: 52.1174°N 13.1954°E
- System: Hp
- Owner: DB Netz
- Operator: DB Station&Service
- Lines: Berlin–Halle railway (KBS 250)
- Platforms: 2 side platforms
- Tracks: 2
- Train operators: DB Regio Nordost

Other information
- Station code: 6877
- DS100 code: BWOL
- IBNR: 8013345
- Category: 6
- Fare zone: VBB: 6453
- Website: www.bahnhof.de

Services
Preceding station	DB Regio Nordost	Following station
Trebbin towards Stralsund Hbf or Schwedt	RE 3	Luckenwalde towards Jüterbog or Lutherstadt Wittenberg Hbf
Location
- Location within Brandenburg Location within Germany Location within Europe

Woltersdorf (Nuthe-Urstromtal) station is a railway station in the municipality of Woltersdorf (Nuthe-Urstromtal), located in the Teltow-Fläming district in Brandenburg, Germany.
