= Warnitz (Uckermark) station =

Railway station in Germany

Warnitz (Uckermark)
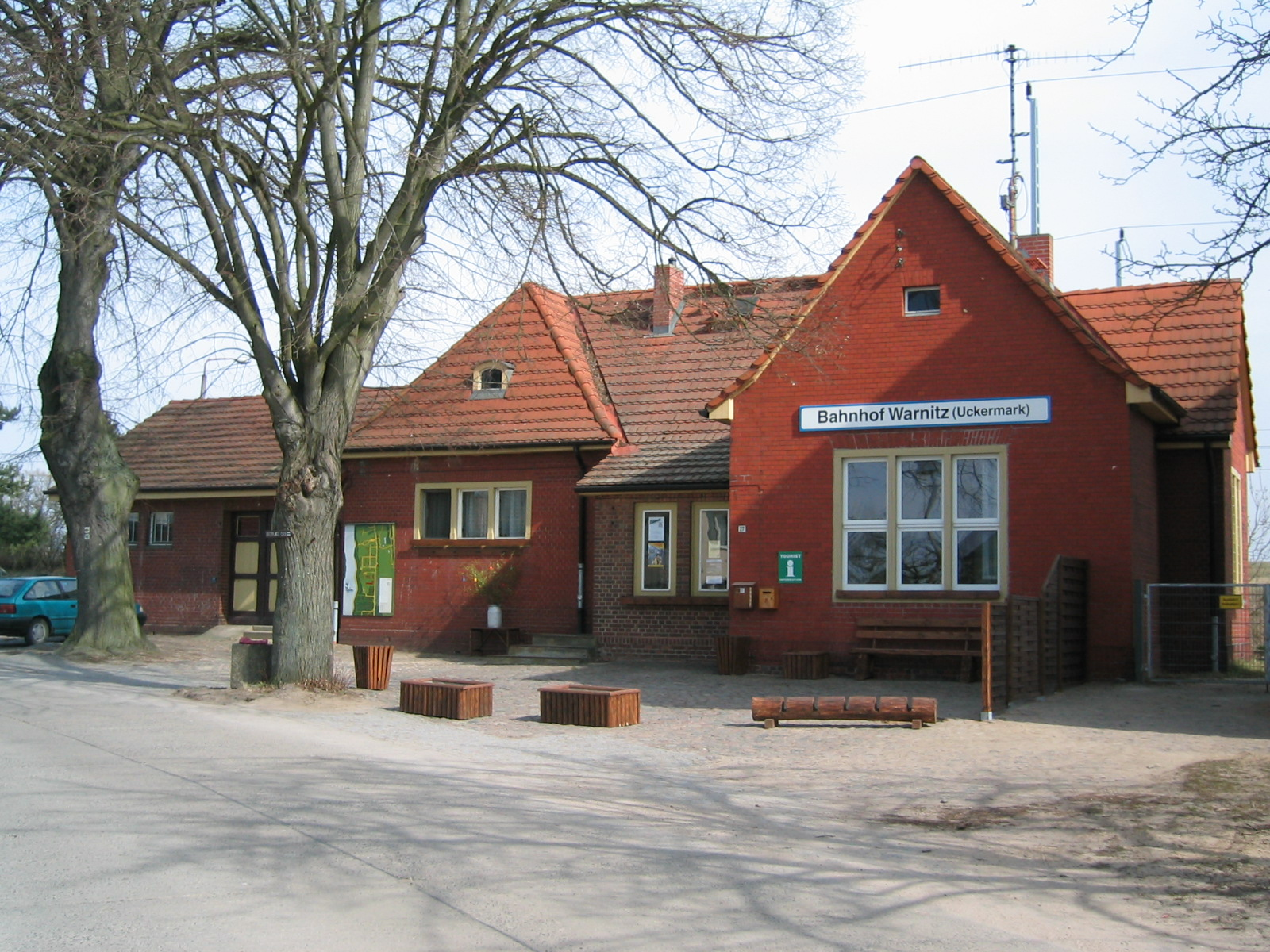
- Warnitz (Uckermark) railway station

General information
- Location: Warnitz, Brandenburg, Germany
- Coordinates: 53°11′01″N 13°52′38″E
- Owner: DB Netz
- Operator: DB Station&Service
- Line: Angermünde–Stralsund railway
- Platforms: 2
- Tracks: 2

Other information
- Fare zone: VBB: 4063

History
- Opened: 1894

Services
Preceding station	DB Regio Nordost	Following station
Seehausen (Uckermark) towards Stralsund Hbf	RE 3	Wilmersdorf (Angermünde) towards Jüterbog or Lutherstadt Wittenberg Hbf
Location
- Location within Brandenburg Location within Germany Location within Europe

Warnitz (Uckermark) (German: Bahnhof Warnitz (Uckermark)) is a railway station in the village of Warnitz, Brandenburg, Germany. The station lies of the Angermünde–Stralsund railway and the train services are operated by Deutsche Bahn.

== Train services ==
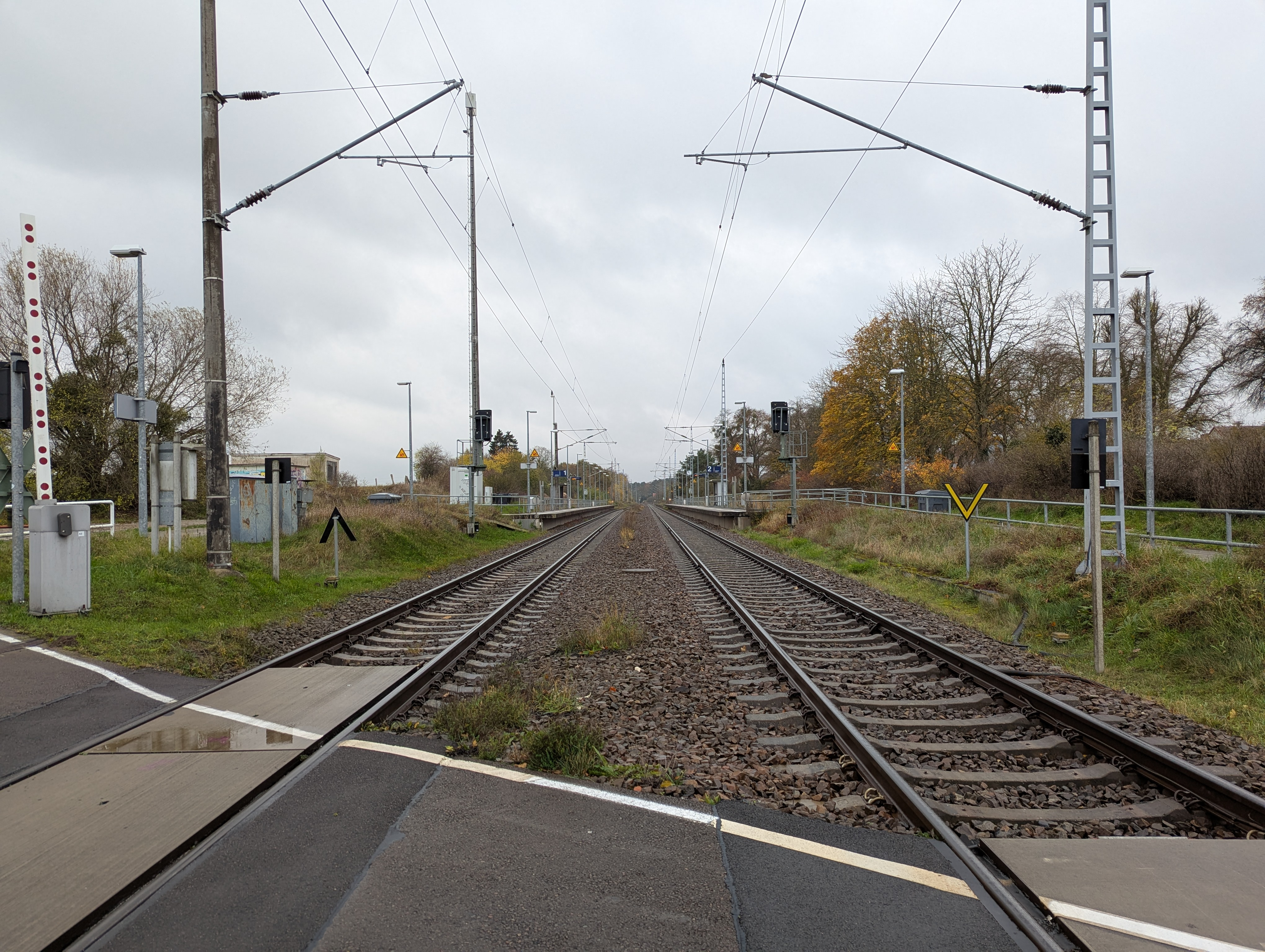
Haltepunkt Warnitz (Uckermark, 2024)

The station is served by the following service(s):

- Regional services RE 3 Stralsund - Greifswald - Pasewalk - Angermünde - Berlin - Ludwigsfelde - Jüterbog - Falkenberg - Elsterwerda
