= Wilmersdorf (Angermünde) station =

Railway station in Germany

Wilmersdorf (b Angermünde)
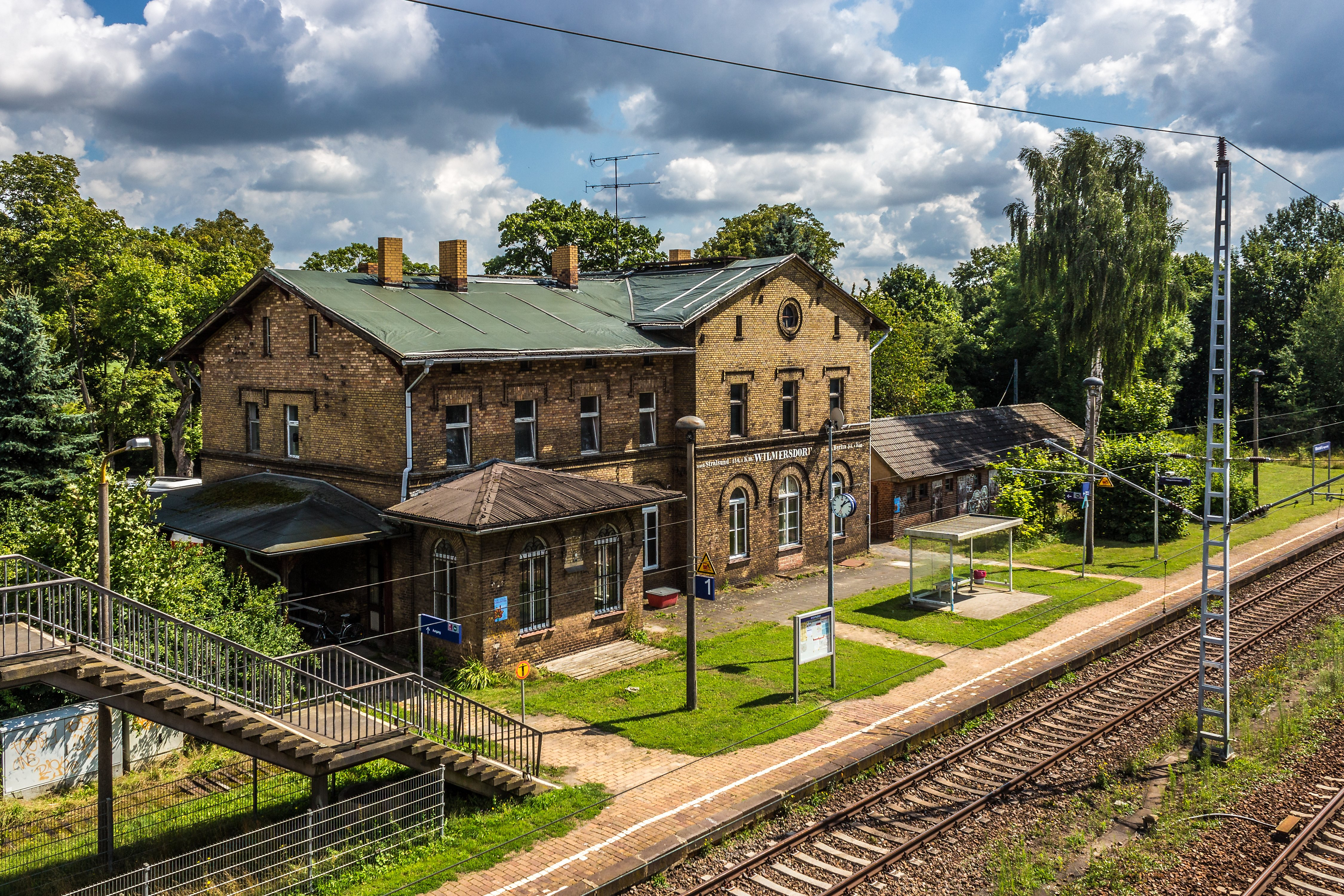
- 2014

General information
- Location: Bahnhofstraße 5; 16278 Wilmersdorf; Brandenburg; Germany
- Coordinates: 53°06′41″N 13°53′33″E
- Owner: DB Netz
- Operator: DB Station&Service
- Lines: Angermünde–Stralsund railway (KBS 203)
- Platforms: 2 side platforms
- Tracks: 3
- Train operators: DB Regio Nordost; Niederbarnimer Eisenbahn

Other information
- Station code: 6783
- DS100 code: WWLD
- IBNR: 8013313
- Category: 6
- Fare zone: : 4263
- Website: www.bahnhof.de

History
- Opened: 16 March 1863; 163 years ago

Services
Preceding station	DB Regio Nordost	Following station
Warnitz (Uckermark) towards Stralsund Hbf	RE 3	Angermünde towards Jüterbog or Lutherstadt Wittenberg Hbf
Location
- Location within Brandenburg Location within Germany Location within Europe

Wilmersdorf (Angermünde) station (German: Bahnhof Wilmersdorf (Angermünde)) is a railway station in the Wilmersdorf district in the municipality of Angermünde, located in the Uckermark district in Brandenburg, Germany. The station lies on the Angermünde–Stralsund railway and the train services are operated by Deutsche Bahn.

== Train services ==
The station is served by the following service(s):

- Regional services RE 3 Stralsund - Greifswald - Pasewalk - Angermünde - Berlin - Ludwigsfelde - Jüterbog - Falkenberg - Elsterwerda
