= Angermünde-Schwedt railway =

Railway line in Germany

Coordinates: 53°0′N 13°59′E

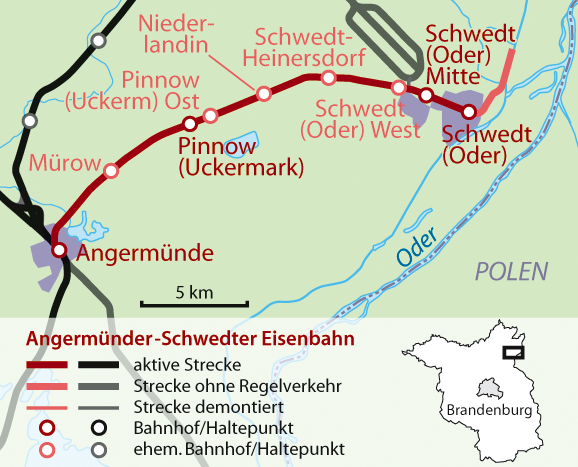
- Route of the Angermünde-Schwedt railway

Overview
- Line number: 6764
- Locale: Brandenburg, Germany

Service
- Route number: 203

Technical
- Line length: 23.1 km (14.4 mi)
- Track gauge: 1,435 mm (4 ft 8 1/2 in) standard gauge
- Minimum radius: 600 m (2,000 ft)
- Electrification: 15 kV/16.7 Hz AC overhead catenary
- Operating speed: 80 km/h (50 mph) (maximum)
- Maximum incline: 1.0%

The Angermünde–Schwedt railway is a single track branch line in the district of Uckermark of the German state of Brandenburg. It connects the towns of Angermünde and Schwedt and the municipality of Pinnow to each other. Several halts on the line were abandoned in the 1990s.

Today, the line is served at two-hour intervals by Regional-Express service RE 3 via Eberswalde and Berlin to Lutherstadt Wittenberg. Since the timetable change in December 2014, Regionalbahn service RB 61 running from Monday to Friday between Schwedt and Angermünde only are operated by NEB Betriebsgesellschaft mbH, while services continuing towards Berlin as Regional-Express service RE 3 are operated by DB Regio. Both services run alternately on working days, so that there is an hourly service between Angermünde and Schwedt. The additional peak hour services of line RE 3 between Angermünde and Schwedt has since been redesignated as Regional-Bahn service RB 61.

== Route description ==
=== Course ===
The line separates at Angermünde station from the Berlin–Szczecin railway and runs in a long curve to the east. Between Pinnow and Schwedt, the newly built federal highway 2 runs largely parallel to the line and crosses it a total of four times.

=== Stations and halts ===
Mürow halt

The halt of Mürow (km 5.4) had a simple side-platform. It operated between 1888 and 27 May 1995.

Pinnow (Uckermark) station

Pinnow station (km 8.9) is the only place on the line where trains can cross. There is a platform only on one track, the crossing loop has no platform.

Pinnow (Uckermark) Ost halt

The halt of Pinnow Ost (east; km 10.0) was created in the 1960s to serve the Pinnow maintenance works of the NPA. After 1996, it was served only irregularly and, on 23 May 1998, it was finally closed.

Niederlandin station

The station (later halt) of Niederlandin (km 13.0) was used to serve the former independent municipality of Niederlandin, now a district of the municipality of Mark Landin. It was opened in 1888 and closed on 27 May 1995 due to low usage.

Schwedt-Heinersdorf station

Schwedt-Heinersdorf station (km 16.7) was opened in 1888. To distinguish it from other stations called Heinersdorf, it was later given the suffix (Kr. Angermünde) (Angermünde district) and it was renamed after its incorporation into Schwedt as Schwedt-Heinersdorf. After 1994, only one pair of trains stopped at the station each day, which had meanwhile been reclassified as a halt, and it was closed on 27 May 1995.

Schwedt (Oder) West halt

The halt of Schwedt West (km 20.8) was located directly at the junction of the connecting line from the PCK refinery to the line. It was opened on 26 September 1976 and was closed on 20 November 1997 in favour of the better situated Schwedt (Oder) Mitte halt.

Schwedt (Oder) Mitte halt

The halt of Schwedt Mitte (middle; km 21.7) is located about 900 metres east of Schwedt West halt. It was opened on 21 November 1997 as a replacement for Schwedt West halt with a simple side platform. The new station is closer to the town centre and is also the central stop of the town bus network.

Schwedt (Oder) station

The terminal station of Schwedt (km 23.1) was opened along with the line on 15 December 1873. It is located north of the medieval core of the town. In addition to a side platform for passenger services, the station also had freight transport facilities. To the east of the terminal station there is a connecting track to the LEIPA paper factory, which continues to the port of Schwedt.

== History ==
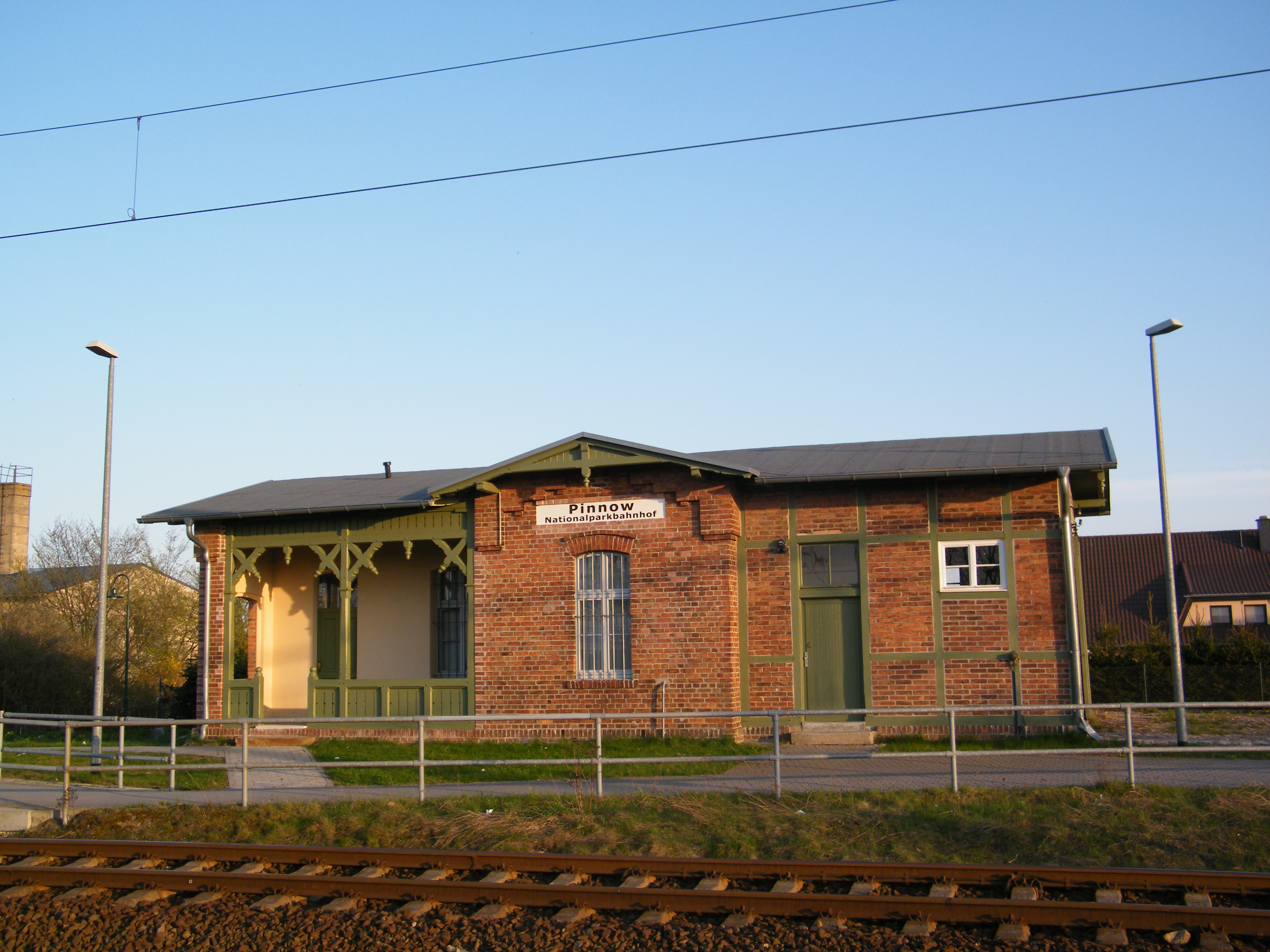
Pinnow station

The newly founded Angermünde-Schwedter Eisenbahn-Gesellschaft (Angermünde-Schwedt Railway Company, ASE) received the concession to build the round 25 kilometre-long line on 25 March 1872 for a connection from the Berlin–Szczecin railway to the Oder harbour in Schwedt. After about one and a half year of construction, the single-track branch line, which initially had no intermediate stations between the two terminal stations, was opened on 15 December 1873. For financial reasons, the Berlin-Stettiner Eisenbahn-Gesellschaft (Berlin-Stettin Railway Company, BStE) was responsible for management and also supplied the rolling stock. Six years later the company was nationalised and the operation was taken over by the Prussian state railways.

Around 1888, several more halts were put into operation along the line, including in Pinnow and Niederlandin.

In the 1944/45 timetable, seven train pairs ran daily on the line. These were confined to the main section and did not continue past Angermünde.

In the 1990s several stations were closed due to lack of demand. At the same time, Schwedt West station was closed and replaced by the more central halt of Schwedt Mitte. Deutsche Bahn operated Regional-Express service RE 3 from then on. Since these trains were operated with electric locomotives of class 143 and the branch line itself was not yet electrified, diesel locomotives of class 232 or, more rarely, class 219 were attached to the front of the trains at Angermünde station and then hauled the trains to Schwedt. The additional shuttles between Angermünde and Schwedt, on the other hand, were operated with class 628/928 diesel multiple units.

Since this operation was very costly, the Brandenburg government approved the electrification and upgrading of the line at the end of 2004 for €74 million. In addition to the installation of overhead wires, all the important level crossings along the line were protected and the line was upgraded for a top speed of 80 km/h. The line has been electrified since the timetable change in December 2005.

In the later 2000s, Regional-Express service RE 3 was reinforced by a service between Angermünde and Schwedt during the week in order to be able to cope with the increase in passenger numbers on this section of the line and to ensure an hourly connection between Berlin and Schwedt.
