= Altes Lager station =

Railway station in Altes Lager

Altes Lager

General information
- Location: Kastanienallee/Bahnhof; 14913 Niedergörsdorf; Brandenburg; Germany
- Coordinates: 52°00′57″N 12°59′33″E
- Owner: DB Netz
- Operator: DB Station&Service
- Lines: Jüterbog–Nauen railway (KBS 209.33)
- Platforms: 1 side platform
- Tracks: 1
- Train operators: ODEG

Other information
- Station code: 3072
- DS100 code: BJA
- IBNR: 8011968
- Category: 7
- Fare zone: : 6749
- Website: www.bahnhof.de

Services
Preceding station	Ostdeutsche Eisenbahn	Following station
Treuenbrietzen Süd towards Potsdam Hbf	RB 33	Jüterbog Terminus
Location
- Location within Brandenburg Location within Germany Location within Europe

Altes Lager station is a railway station in the municipality of Altes Lager, located in the Teltow-Fläming district in Brandenburg, Germany.
