= Alt Hüttendorf station =

Railway station in Germany

Alt Hüttendorf
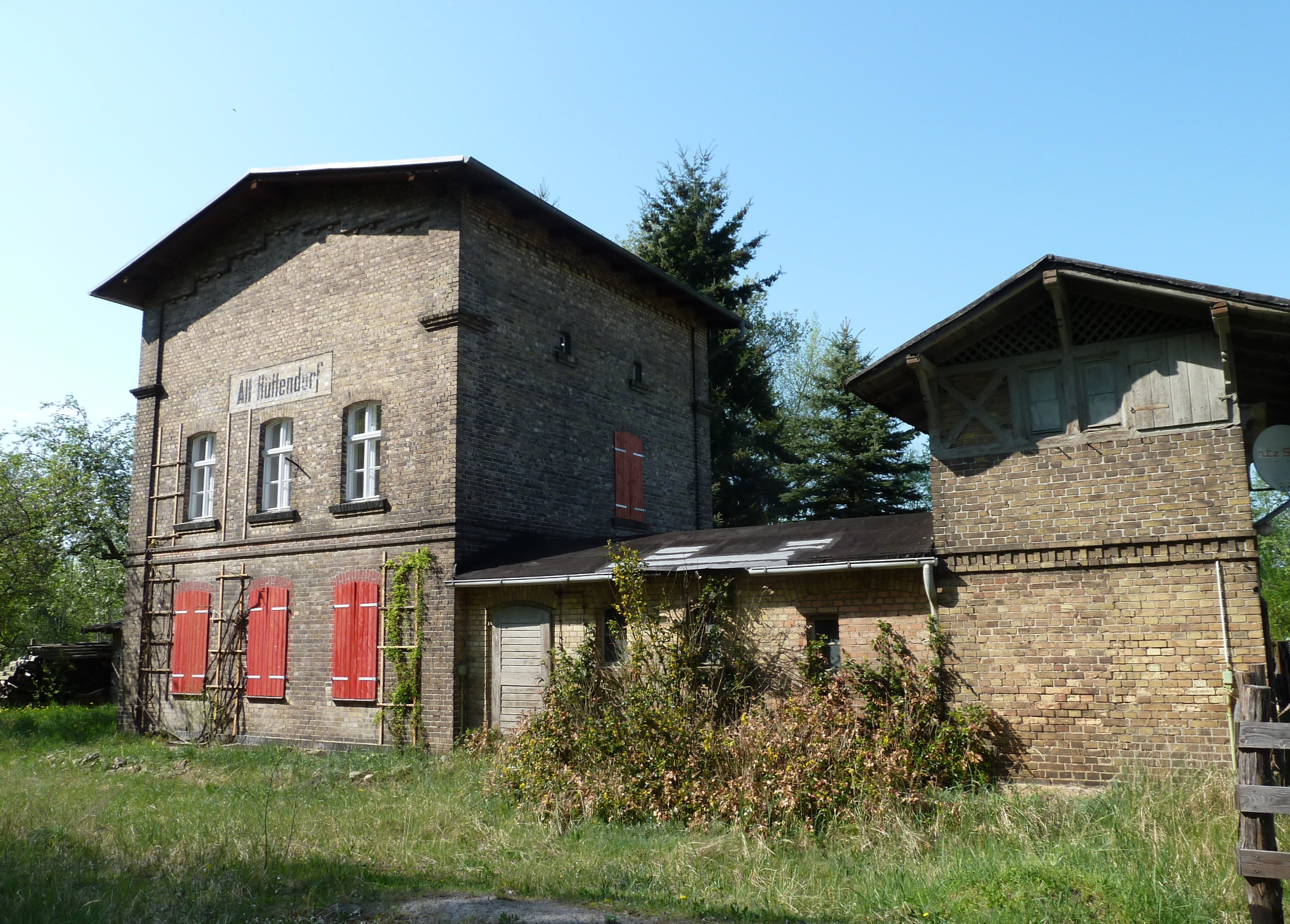

General information
- Location: Bahnhofstraße 2; 16247 Althüttendorf; Brandenburg; Germany
- Coordinates: 52°57′27″N 13°47′01″E
- Owner: DB Netz
- Operator: DB Station&Service
- Line: Britz–Fürstenberg railway
- Platforms: 1 side platform
- Tracks: 1
- Train operators: Niederbarnimer Eisenbahn

Other information
- Station code: 67
- DS100 code: WAHU
- IBNR: 8011011
- Category: 6
- Fare zone: : 4562
- Website: www.bahnhof.de

Services
Preceding station	Niederbarnimer Eisenbahn	Following station
Joachimsthal Kaiserbahnhof towards Templin Stadt	RB 63	Golzow (bei Eberswalde) towards Eberswalde Hbf
Location
- Location within Brandenburg

Alt Hüttendorf station is a railway station in the municipality of Althüttendorf, located in the Barnim district in Brandenburg, Germany.
