= Golzow (bei Eberswalde) station =

Railway station in Germany

Golzow (bei Eberswalde) Golzow (b Eberswalde)
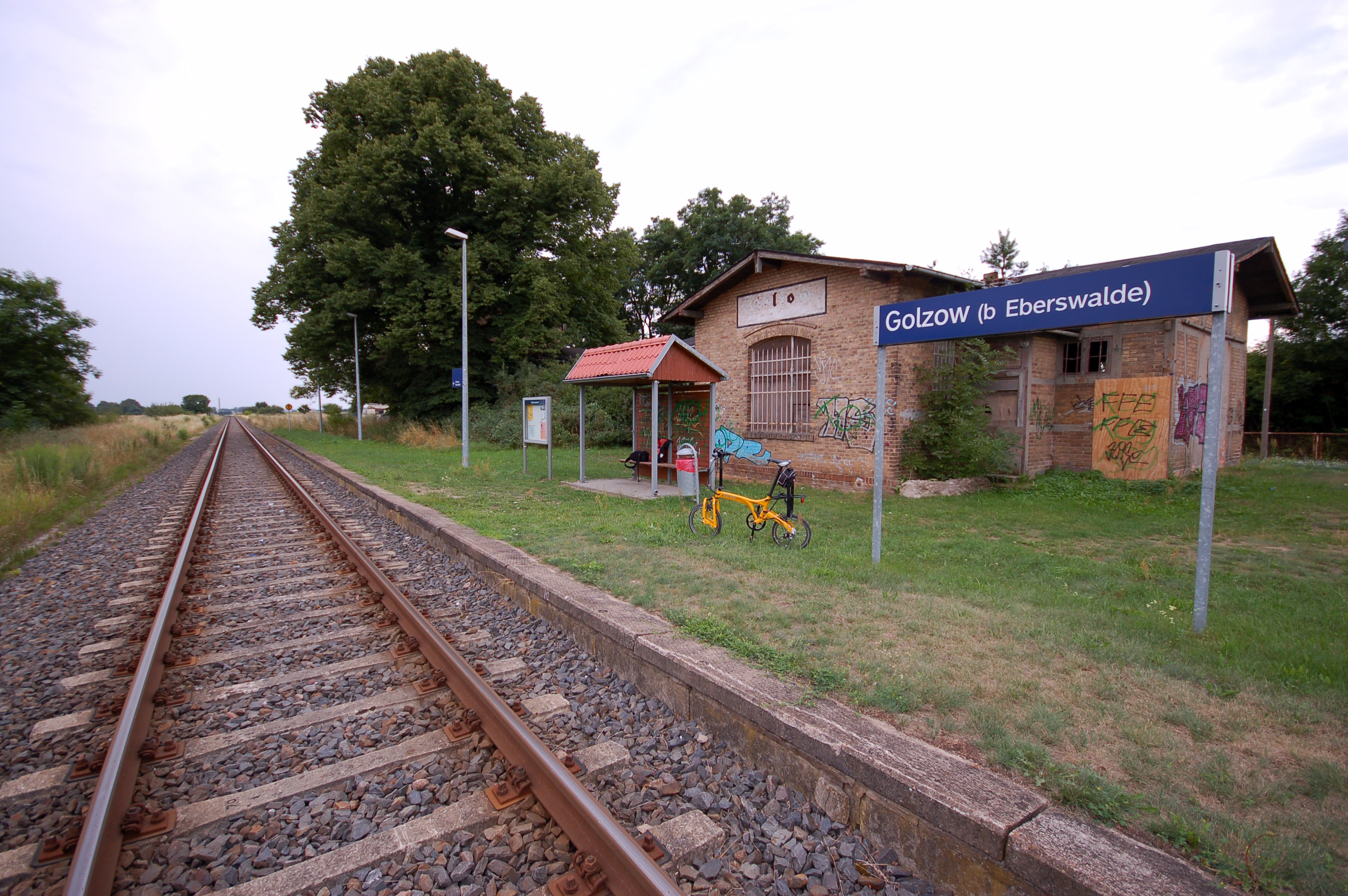

General information
- Location: Bahnhofstraße 1; 16230 Chorin-Golzow; Brandenburg; Germany
- Coordinates: 52.9140°N 13.8268°E
- Owner: DB Netz
- Operator: DB Station&Service
- Line: Britz–Fürstenberg railway
- Platforms: 1 side platform
- Tracks: 1
- Train operators: Niederbarnimer Eisenbahn

Other information
- Station code: 2182
- DS100 code: WGOL
- IBNR: 8011671
- Category: 7
- Fare zone: VBB: 4662
- Website: www.bahnhof.de

Services
Preceding station	Niederbarnimer Eisenbahn	Following station
Alt Hüttendorf towards Templin Stadt	RB 63	Britz towards Eberswalde Hbf
Location
- Location within Brandenburg

Golzow (bei Eberswalde) station is a railway station in the Golzow district of the municipality of Chorin, located in the Barnim district in Brandenburg, Germany.
