= Angermünde station =

Railway station in Germany

Angermünde
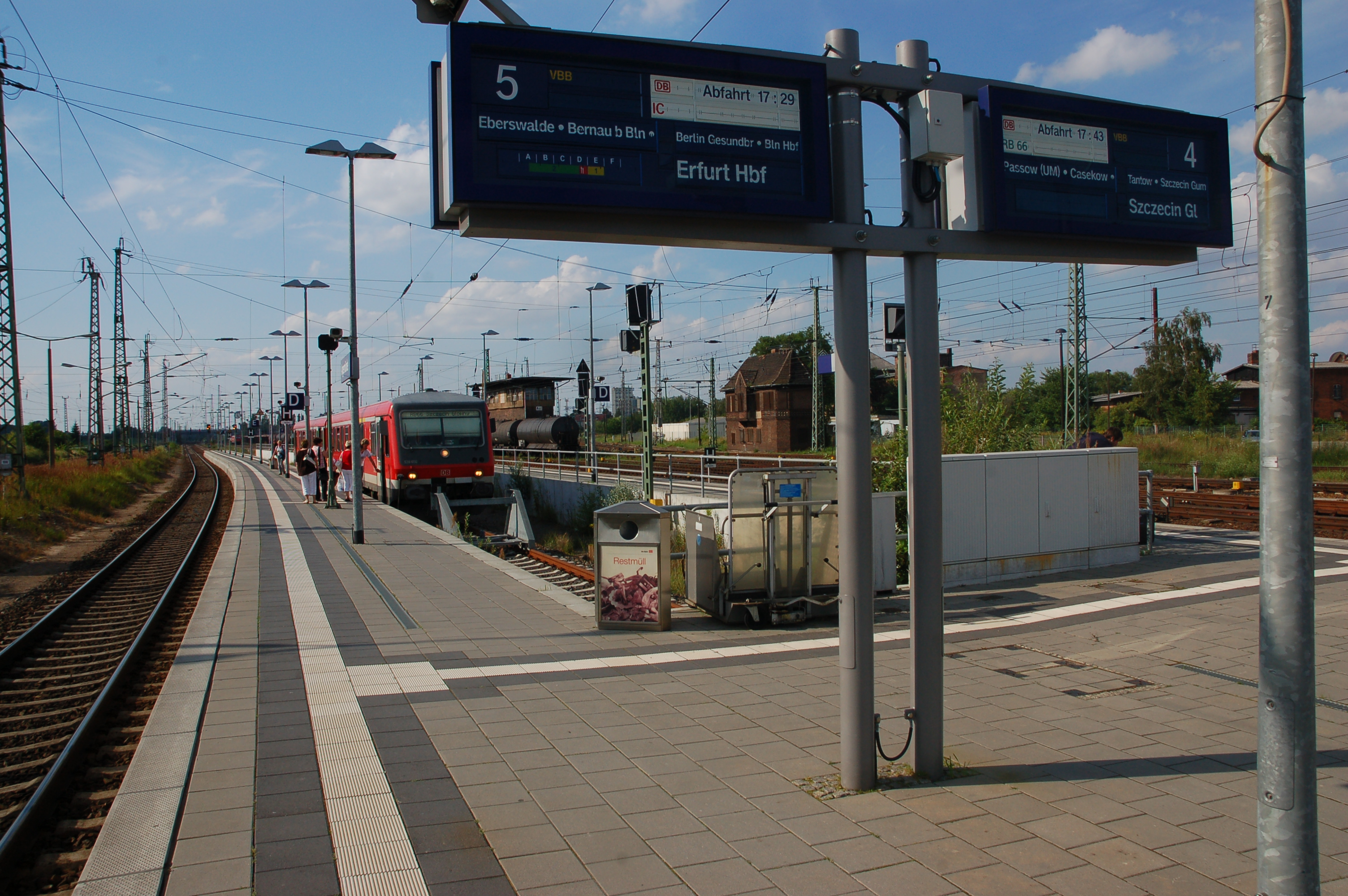
- Platform

General information
- Location: Bahnhofsplatz 1c, Angermünde, Brandenburg; Germany
- Coordinates: 53°0′56″N 13°59′46″E
- Owner: Deutsche Bahn
- Operator: DB Station&Service
- Lines: Berlin–Szczecin (KBS 203, KBS 209.66); Angermünde–Stralsund (KBS 203); Angermünde–Schwedt (KBS 203); Angermünde–Bad Freienwalde (Oder) (closed)
- Platforms: 5

Construction
- Accessible: Yes

Other information
- Station code: 148
- DS100 code: WA
- IBNR: 8010004
- Category: 3
- Fare zone: : 4465
- Website: www.bahnhof.de

History
- Opened: 15 November 1842

Passengers
- < 5,000 daily

Services
Preceding station	DB Fernverkehr	Following station
Prenzlau towards Ostseebad Binz	ICE 15	Eberswalde Hbf towards Frankfurt (Main) Hbf
Prenzlau towards Ostseebad Binz	ICE 28	Eberswalde Hbf towards München Hbf
Preceding station	DB Regio Nordost	Following station
Wilmersdorf (Angermünde) towards Stralsund Hbf	RE 3	Chorin towards Jüterbog or Lutherstadt Wittenberg Hbf
Pinnow towards Schwedt	RE 3	Chorin towards Jüterbog or Lutherstadt Wittenberg Hbf
Prenzlau towards Stralsund Hbf	RE 30	Terminus
Preceding station	Niederbarnimer Eisenbahn	Following station
Pinnow towards Schwedt	RB 61	Terminus
Location

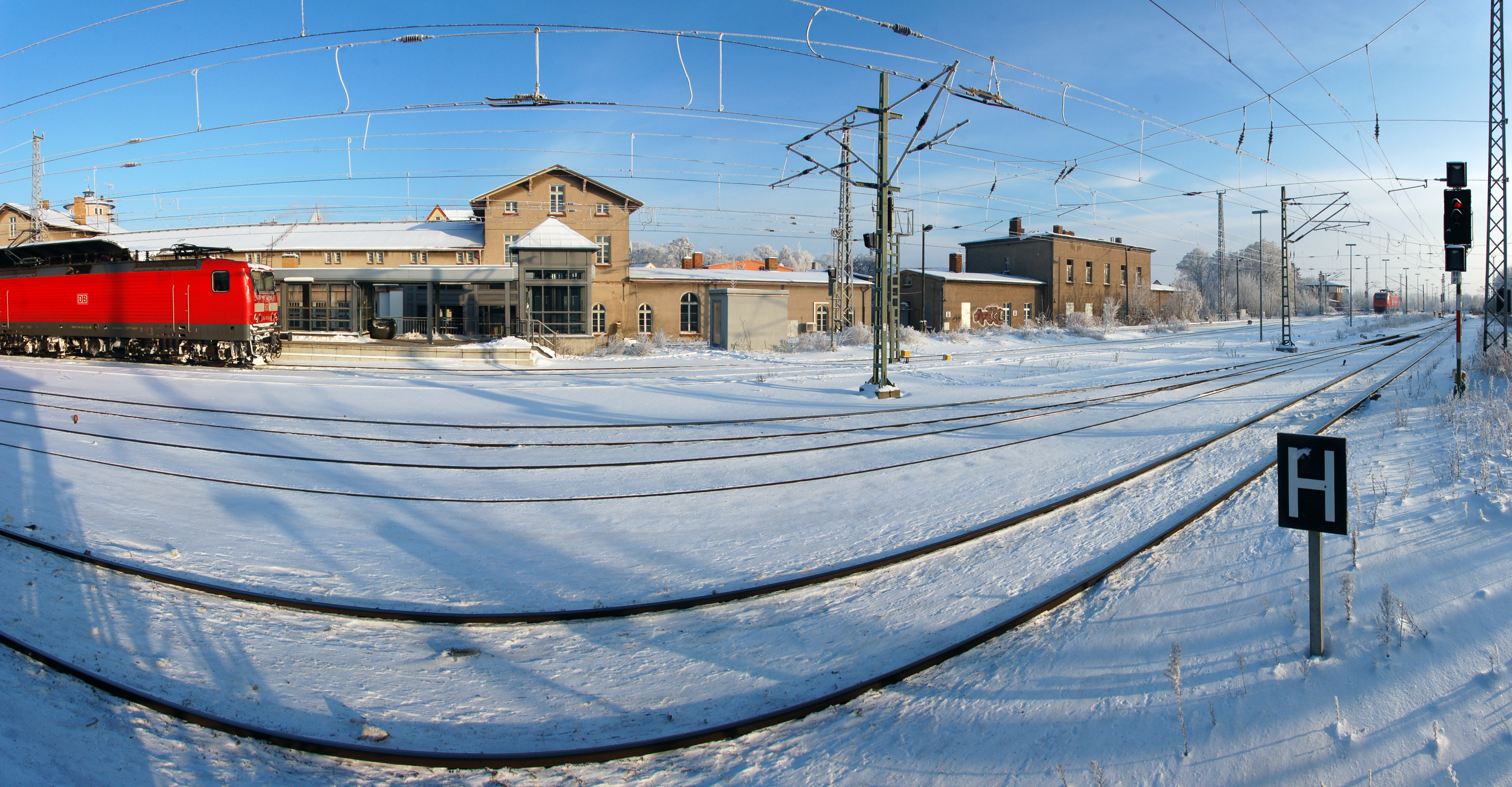
Old (right) and new station

Angermünde station is a transportation hub in the city of Angermünde in the northeast of the German state of Brandenburg. The station opened on 15 November 1842 on the Stettin Railway between Berlin and Szczecin and is the starting point of the Angermünde-Stralsund line to Stralsund, the Angermünde-Schwedt line to Schwedt and a disused branch line to Bad Freienwalde.

== History ==
The station was opened on 15 November 1842 by the Berlin-Stettin Railway Company (German: Berlin-Stettiner Eisenbahn-Gesellschaft, BStE) with the line from Berlin. On 15 August 1843, the extension to Szczecin (then part of Prussia and called Stettin in German) was opened. In the following years the station grew into a major junction with the opening of lines to Stralsund (1863), Schwedt (1873) and Bad Freienwalde (1877). In 1879, the BStE was nationalised as part of the Prussian state railways. The station was originally built on an “island” surrounded by tracks (known as an Inselbahnhof in German). In 1906, the tracks were redesigned and all the tracks were moved to the west side of the building. In 1861 the original station building was replaced by a new building. The old building later served as a post office and a police station, but it is now unused. As a result of numerous changes to the building during the period of East Germany (1945–1990) the old building has disappeared. The station complex is a listed building.

== Train services ==
Angermünde station is west of central Angermünde. The station building is east of the tracks. The station has two island platforms with four tracks for passenger traffic. At the northern end of the western platform, there is an additional terminal track. Freight facilities are close to the northern end of the passenger station. The line to Schwedt branches directly in the platform area from the other tracks so that only tracks 1 and 2 can be used by trains to and from Schwedt.

In the 2026 timetable the following lines stop at the station:

Line	Route		Frequency (min)
ICE 15	Ostseebad Binz – Stralsund – Angermünde – Berlin – Halle – Erfurt –	– Frankfurt ← Mannheim ← Kaiserslautern ← Saarbrücken	Mo-Fr 2 trains to Frankfurt; Sa, So 1 train from Saarbrücken
ICE 15	Ostseebad Binz – Stralsund – Angermünde – Berlin – Halle – Erfurt –	← Eisenach	One train Fr, Sa
ICE 28	Ostseebad Binz – Stralsund – Angermünde – Berlin – Leipzig (– Jena-Göschwitz) – Nuremberg – Munich		2 train pairs
RE 3	Schwedt (Oder) –	Angermünde – Eberswalde – Berlin – Ludwigsfelde – Jüterbog – Lutherstadt Wittenberg	120
RE 3	Stralsund – Züssow –	Angermünde – Eberswalde – Berlin – Ludwigsfelde – Jüterbog – Lutherstadt Wittenberg	120
RE 30	Stralsund – Greifswald – Pasewalk – Prenzlau – Angermünde		120
RB 61	Angermünde – Schwedt (Oder)		120
