= Pinnow, Brandenburg =

Pinnow
- Municipality
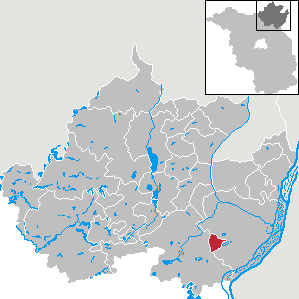
- Location of Pinnow within Uckermark district
- Interactive map of Pinnow
- Location within Germany Location within Brandenburg
- Coordinates: 53°4′N 14°5′E
- Country: Germany
- State: Brandenburg
- District: Uckermark

Government
  - Mayor (2019–24): Walter Kotzian

Area
  - Total: 12.93 km^{2} (4.99 sq mi)
- Elevation: 45 m (148 ft)

Population (2025-12-31)
  - Total: 890
  - Density: 69/km^{2} (180/sq mi)
- Time zone: UTC+01:00 (CET)
  - Summer (DST): UTC+02:00 (CEST)
- Postal codes: 16278
- Dialling codes: 033335
- Vehicle registration: UM
- Website: www.amt-oder-welse.de

Pinnow is a municipality in the Uckermark district, in Brandenburg, Germany.

== Demography ==
Development of population since 1875 within the current boundaries (Blue line: Population; Dotted line: Comparison to population development of Brandenburg state; Grey background: Time of Nazi rule; Red background: Time of communist rule)

Pinnow [Uckermark]: Population development
within the current boundaries (2017)

Year	Pop.	±% p.a.
1875	443	—
1890	427	−0.24%
1910	472	+0.50%
1925	407	−0.98%
1933	453	+1.35%
1939	434	−0.71%
1946	636	+5.61%
1950	670	+1.31%
1964	914	+2.24%
1971	744	−2.90%
1981	769	+0.33%
1985	887	+3.63%
1989	862	−0.71%
1990	876	+1.62%

Year	Pop.	±% p.a.
1991	859	−1.94%
1992	834	−2.91%
1993	794	−4.80%
1994	805	+1.39%
1995	780	−3.11%
1996	784	+0.51%
1997	863	+10.08%
1998	847	−1.85%
1999	900	+6.26%
2000	904	+0.44%
2001	925	+2.32%
2002	944	+2.05%
2003	938	−0.64%
2004	948	+1.07%

Year	Pop.	±% p.a.
2005	934	−1.48%
2006	946	+1.28%
2007	944	−0.21%
2008	922	−2.33%
2009	922	+0.00%
2010	916	−0.65%
2011	912	−0.44%
2012	892	−2.19%
2013	863	−3.25%
2014	859	−0.46%
2015	853	−0.70%
2016	876	+2.70%
2017	900	+2.74%
