= Schwedt station =

Railway station in Schwedt/Oder, Germany

Schwedt (Oder)
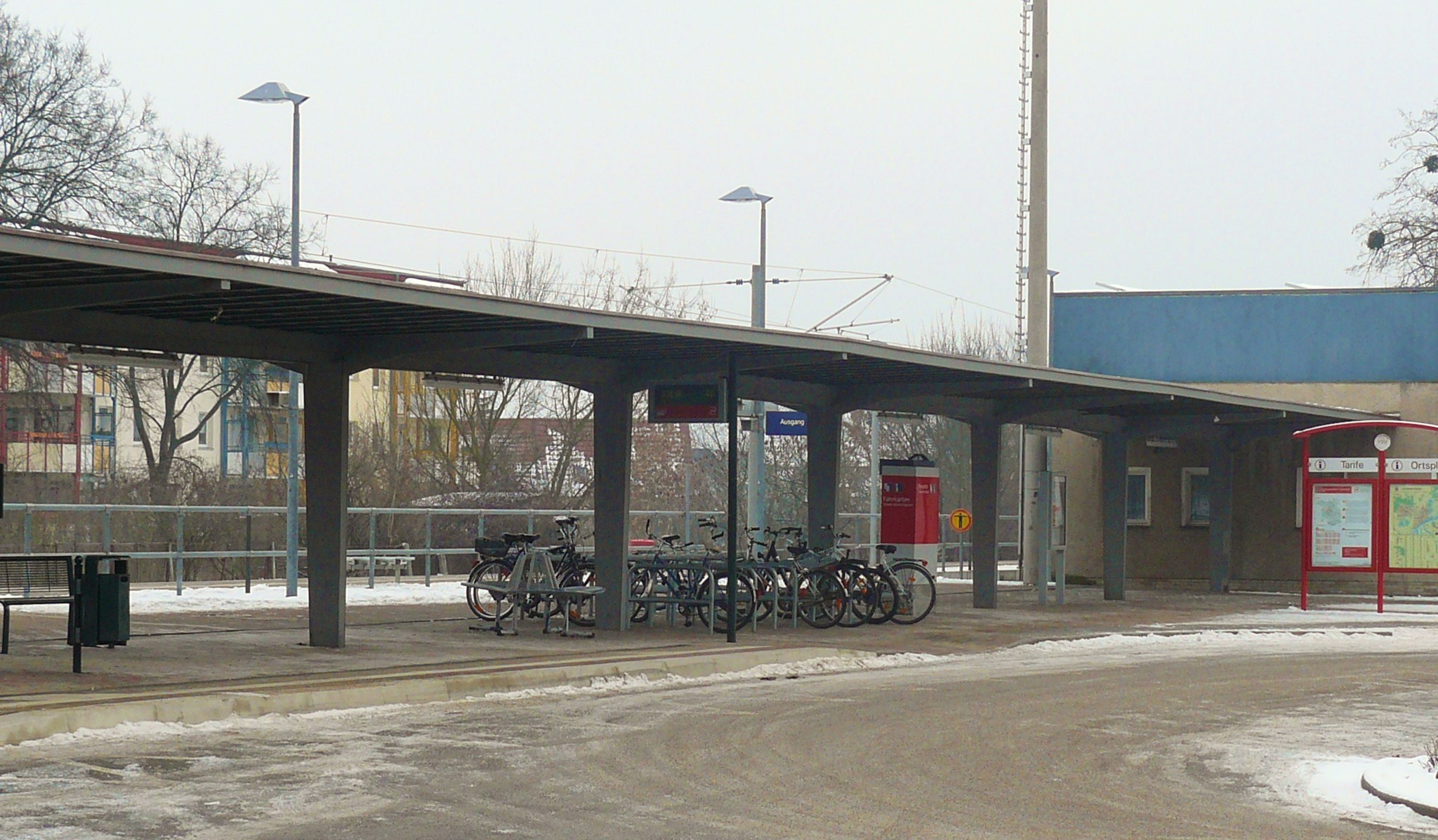
- Schwedt railway station

General information
- Location: Bahnhofstr. 38, Schwedt, Brandenburg; Germany
- Coordinates: 53°03′46″N 14°17′26″E
- Owner: Deutsche Bahn
- Operator: DB Station&Service
- Line: Angermünde-Schwedt railway
- Platforms: 1
- Tracks: 3

Construction
- Accessible: Yes

Other information
- Station code: 5736
- DS100 code: WSC
- IBNR: 8012943
- Category: 6
- Fare zone: VBB: 4369
- Website: www.bahnhof.de

History
- Opened: 15 December 1873

Services
Preceding station	DB Regio Nordost	Following station
Schwedt Mitte towards Jüterbog or Lutherstadt Wittenberg Hbf	RE 3	Terminus
Preceding station	Niederbarnimer Eisenbahn	Following station
Schwedt Mitte towards Angermünde	RB 61	Terminus
Location
- Location within Brandenburg Location within Germany Location within Europe

Schwedt (Oder) station is, along with the halt of Schwedt (Oder) Mitte, a station in the town of Schwedt in the Uckermark district of the German state of Brandenburg. It is heritage listed along with the goods sheds, the locomotive shed, the water tower and the water crane.

== Location ==
The station is located at the kilometre 23.1 km of the Angermünde-Schwedt railway, about one kilometre east of the town centre. Adjacent roads are Gustav-Rotkopf-Straße, Karl-Marx-Straße and Berliner Straße. The nearest station to the west is Schwedt (Oder) Mitte, about one kilometre away. The station is in the area of the Verkehrsverbund Berlin-Brandenburg (Berlin-Brandenburg transport association).

== History ==
At the same time, the station was put into operation along with the Angermünde–Schwedt railway on 15 December 1873.

In 1981, seven trains a day ran from Angermünde to Schwedt station about 5:31, 9:00, 14:13, 16:06, 16:58, 18:17 and 20:57. Services ran from Schwedt to Angermünde at about 6:10, 6:48, 9:15, 10:48, 16:34, 16:53, 18:13, 19:01 and 21:20.

== Facilities ==
Today, the station has one side platform, which is 189 m long and 76 cm high. It once had various freight transport facilities.

== Connections ==
In the 2016 timetable Schwedt (Oder) station is served by the following services:

Line	Route	Interval (min)	P[erator
RE 3	Schwedt (Oder) – Angermünde – Berlin – Jüterbog – Lutherstadt Wittenberg	120	DB Regio Nordost
RB 61	Schwedt (Oder) – Angermünde	120 (Mon–Fri)	Niederbarnimer Eisenbahn
