= Jüterbog station =

Railway station in Jüterbog, Germany

Jüterbog
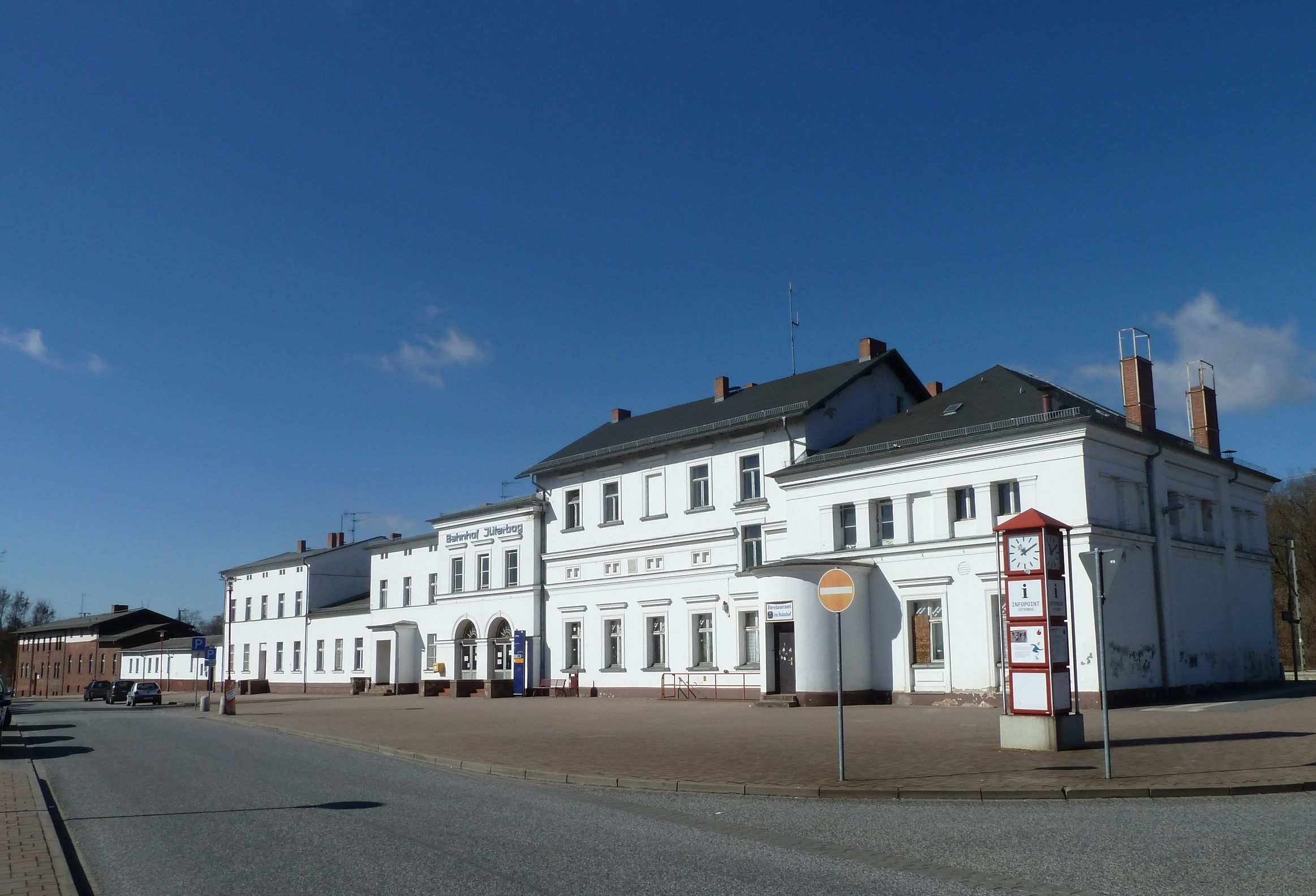
- Entrance building, street side

General information
- Location: Am Bahnhof; 14913 Jüterbog; Brandenburg; Germany
- Coordinates: 51°59′51″N 13°03′16″E
- Elevation: 83 m (272 ft)
- Owner: Deutsche Bahn
- Operator: DB Station&Service
- Lines: Berlin–Halle; Jüterbog–Röderau; Jüterbog–Nauen; Zossen–Jüterbog (closed); Dahme–Jüterbog (closed)
- Platforms: 1 island platform 1 side platform
- Tracks: 4

Construction
- Accessible: Yes

Other information
- Station code: 3071
- DS100 code: BJUE
- IBNR: 8010182
- Category: 4
- Fare zone: : 6751
- Website: www.bahnhof.de

History
- Opened: 1 July 1841

Services
| Preceding station | DB Regio Nordost | Following station |
|---|---|---|
| Luckenwalde towards Stralsund Hbf or Schwedt | RE 3 | Oehna towards Falkenberg (Elster) |
| Luckenwalde towards Stralsund Hbf or Schwedt | RE 3 | Niedergörsdorf towards Lutherstadt Wittenberg Hbf |
| Luckenwalde towards Rathenow or Stendal Hbf | RE 4 | Oehna towards Falkenberg (Elster) |
| Preceding station | Ostdeutsche Eisenbahn | Following station |
| Altes Lager towards Potsdam Hbf | RB 33 | Terminus |
| Preceding station | Mitteldeutschland S-Bahn | Following station |
| Terminus | S 2 | Niedergörsdorf towards Leipzig-Stötteritz |
| Niedergörsdorf towards Halle (Saale) Hbf | S 8 | Terminus |
Location
- Location within Brandenburg Location within Germany Location within Europe

Jüterbog station is a station in the town of Jüterbog in the German state of Brandenburg. It was opened in 1841, which makes it one of the oldest railway stations in Brandenburg. The Jüterbog–Röderau railway has branched off the Berlin–Halle railway (Anhalterbahn) at the station since 1848. Its importance grew with the opening of further railway lines. Some of these lines have now been closed.

The station has lost its former importance in the fields of long-distance passenger, freight and military transport. Today it is almost exclusively used for regional transport. The entrance building of the station is a protected monument. Also protected are the station building of the Royal Prussian Military Railway, which was used for public transport until the end of the First World War, further buildings of the military railway and the water tower of the former locomotive depot to the north-east of the station.

== Location and name ==
The station is located at line-kilometre 62.8 of the Berlin–Halle railway, calculated from the former Anhalter Bahnhof in Berlin. This line runs approximately north-east to south-west. The now disused route from Zossen, the former Military Railway, reached the station from the north-east, a little south of the direct line from Berlin. The 750 mm gauge railway from Dahme formerly ran to the station from the east. The line towards Falkenberg and Röderau branches southwards from the line to Halle. On the opposite side, the Jüterbog–Nauen railway branches off; this line soon turns towards the northwest.

The station is well outside the town center, about two kilometers west of the old town. It was originally developed in the open field near the Kappan estate, now the urban development has expanded to the station. The district of Jüterbog II, which was built on an old barracks ground is located on the north side of the station. At the southern end of the station, federal highway 102 crosses the rail tracks.

The station is built on a slope. The terrain falls to the south-east, towards the town centre, while on the other side it rises to the former barracks ground.

The station was named Jüterbog at its opening, but the town and station were later also written as Jüterbogk. Since the beginning of the 20th century only the modern spelling has been customary.

== History ==
=== The first years ===
Already in the middle of the 1830s there were proposals for the construction of a railway connection from Berlin to Leipzig and Dresden. A number of route options were discussed. In the end a route was adopted from Berlin via Jüterbog, Wittenberg and Dessau to Köthen, where connections to Magdeburg and Leipzig existed. In April 1839, the governments of Prussia and the Duchy of Anhalt concluded a treaty to authorise the railway and, in the same month, the corporate statutes of the Berlin-Anhalt Railway Company (Berlin-Anhaltische Eisenbahn-Gesellschaft, BAE) (originally called Berlin-Sächsische Eisenbahn-Gesellschaft—Berlin-Saxon Railway Company) were adopted. Work started on the line on 15 April 1839. After two years of construction, the Berlin–Jüterbog section and the Jüterbog station were opened on 1 July 1841. The BAE officially announced its opening in newspapers published on the opening day. At first, three pairs of trains a day ran between Berlin and Jüterbog, stopping in Trebbin and Luckenwalde. The gap between Jüterbog and Wittenberg was closed on 10 September 1841, completing the whole line. The construction of Jüterbog station had been estimated to cost 16,000 Prussian Reichsthalers, but it actually cost 21,235 Reichsthalers. With the introduction of through traffic, two pairs of through trains crossed in Jüterbog each day between Berlin and Köthen.

At the same time there were considerations of the construction of a connection from Berlin to Dresden. Here, too, various routes were discussed, until a connection from Jüterbog to Röderau, where it would connect to the Leipzig–Dresden railway, was adopted as the best option. The BAE began building the branch line in May 1847 and the section between Jüterbog and Herzberg was completed on 1 July 1848. On 1 October of the same year, it was extended to Röderau with connection curves towards Leipzig and Dresden.

In the 1870s, there were further considerations for an expansion of the line network. This included a line from Glöwen station to the Berlin–Hamburg railway via Brandenburg to Jüterbog, which was not realised.

=== Jüterbog as a railway junction ===
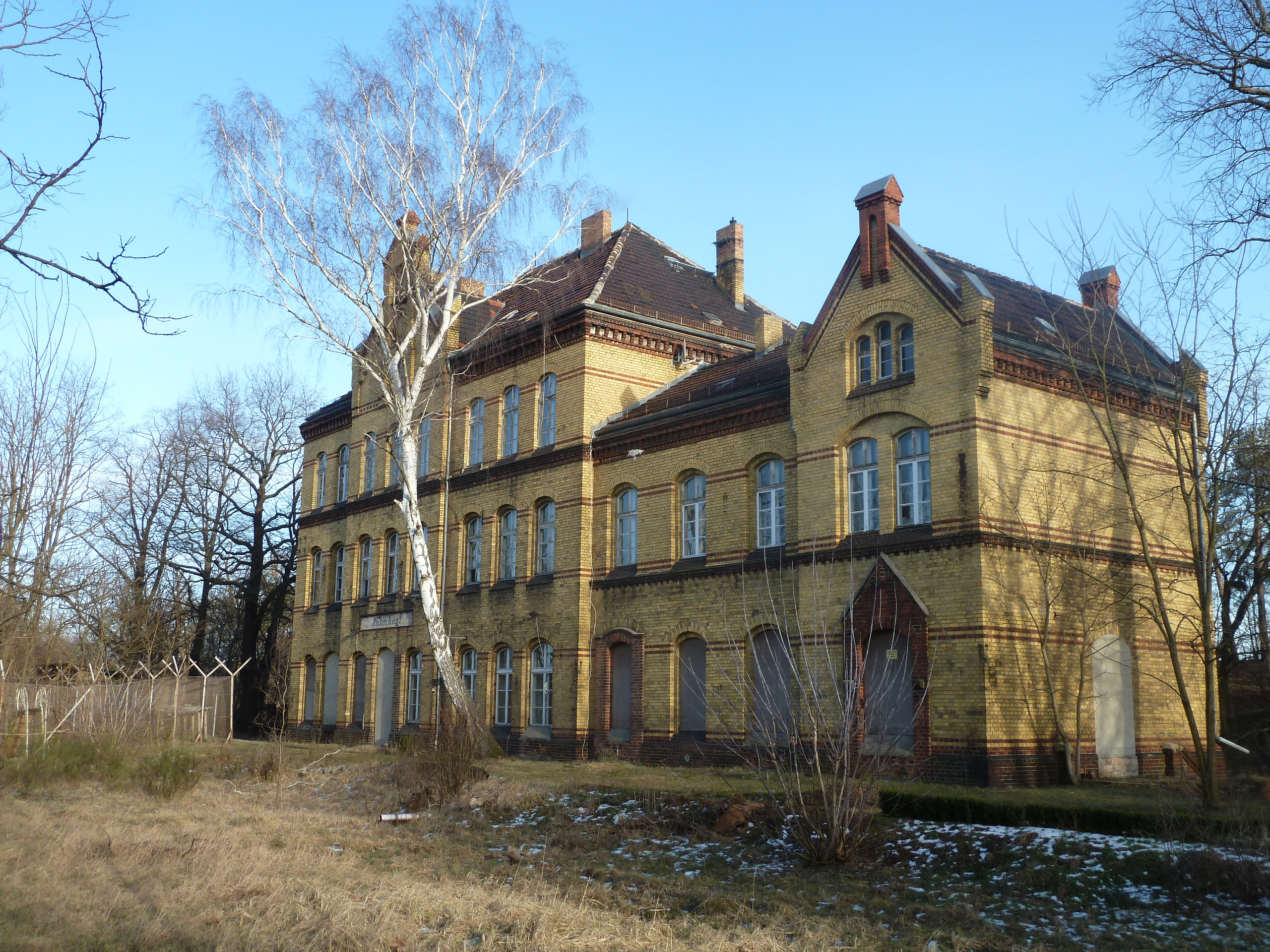
Military Railway station, track side

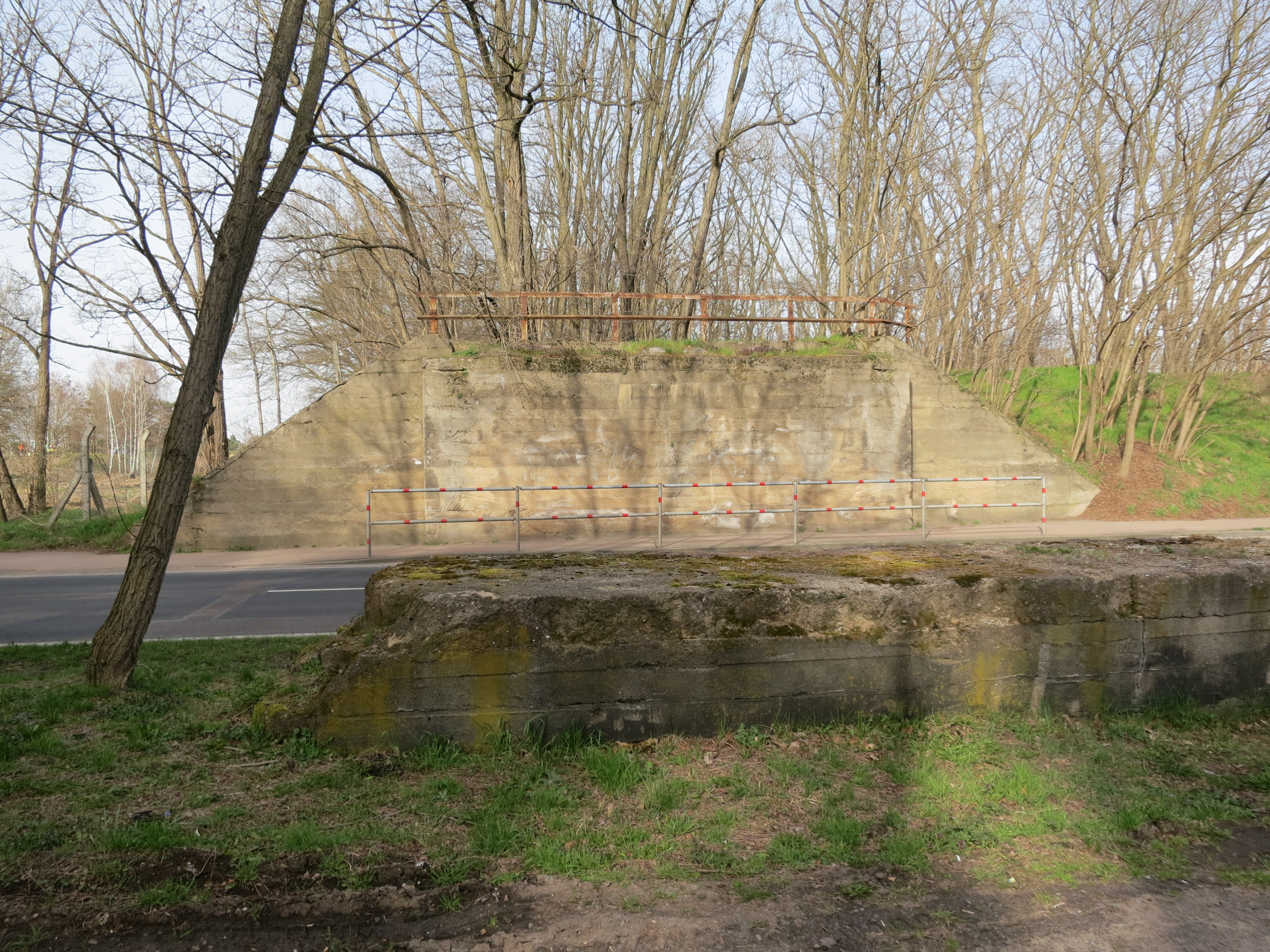
Abutment of the planned bypass from the new long-distance tracks at Neuheimer Weg north of Jüterbog station

In 1894, the line from Jüterbog to Treuenbrietzen was opened, which was extended between 1904 and 1908 as part of a planned Bypass Railway around Berlin via Potsdam to Nauen. the Jüterbog Tramway (Jüterboger Straßenbahn AG) opened in 1896 as a horse tramway from the station to the inner town; it operated until 1928.

The importance of Jüterbog as a military location grew not least due to its good railway connections. The move of the Imperial Artillery Shooting School (Kaiserlichen Artillerie-Schießschule) from Berlin to Jüterbog began in 1890. It settled on a site that was adjacent to the station to the north-west, where extensive barracks were built. In 1897, the Royal Prussian Military Railway extended its line from Berlin to Kummersdorf via Zossen to Jüterbog. The railway crossed the main line north-east of Jüterbog station and had its own station on the side of the railway lines near the barracks.

The terminus of the Jüterbog-Luckenwalde District Light Railway (Jüterbog-Luckenwalder Kreiskleinbahnen), the narrow-gauge line from Dahme/Mark, which was opened in 1900, was on the other side of the main line, approximately opposite the military station.

At the beginning of the 20th century, traffic on the Berlin–Halle railway increased significantly. For this reason, extensive work began on the upgrade of the Berlin–Halle railway after 1910. It was planned to upgrade the section from Berlin to Jüterbog to four tracks. The works were already well advanced in 1915, but came to a standstill because of the First World War. A large number of relics of the construction which had just begun, are still recognisable. In the area around Jüterbog station, there is an embankment north-west of the existing railway that was intended to be used for the new long-distance tracks. Extensive structures south of the station were built to provide grade-separated crossings of the lines to Röderau and Wittenberg. The reconstruction of the tracks in the north-eastern station area was completed. After the First World War, the upgrade plans were revived, but the work was finally discontinued in 1922, not least because the Wiesenburg–Roßlau railway, an additional connection between Berlin and Central Germany, was under construction and would relieve the Berlin–Halle railway.

Under the Treaty of Versailles, the Military Railway had to be abandoned from Berlin to Jüterbog. The section from Zossen to Jüterbog remained in operation for civilian use, but the trains now ran to the main station. The overpass over the tracks of the Berlin–Halle railway was dismantled.

=== Developments since 1945 ===
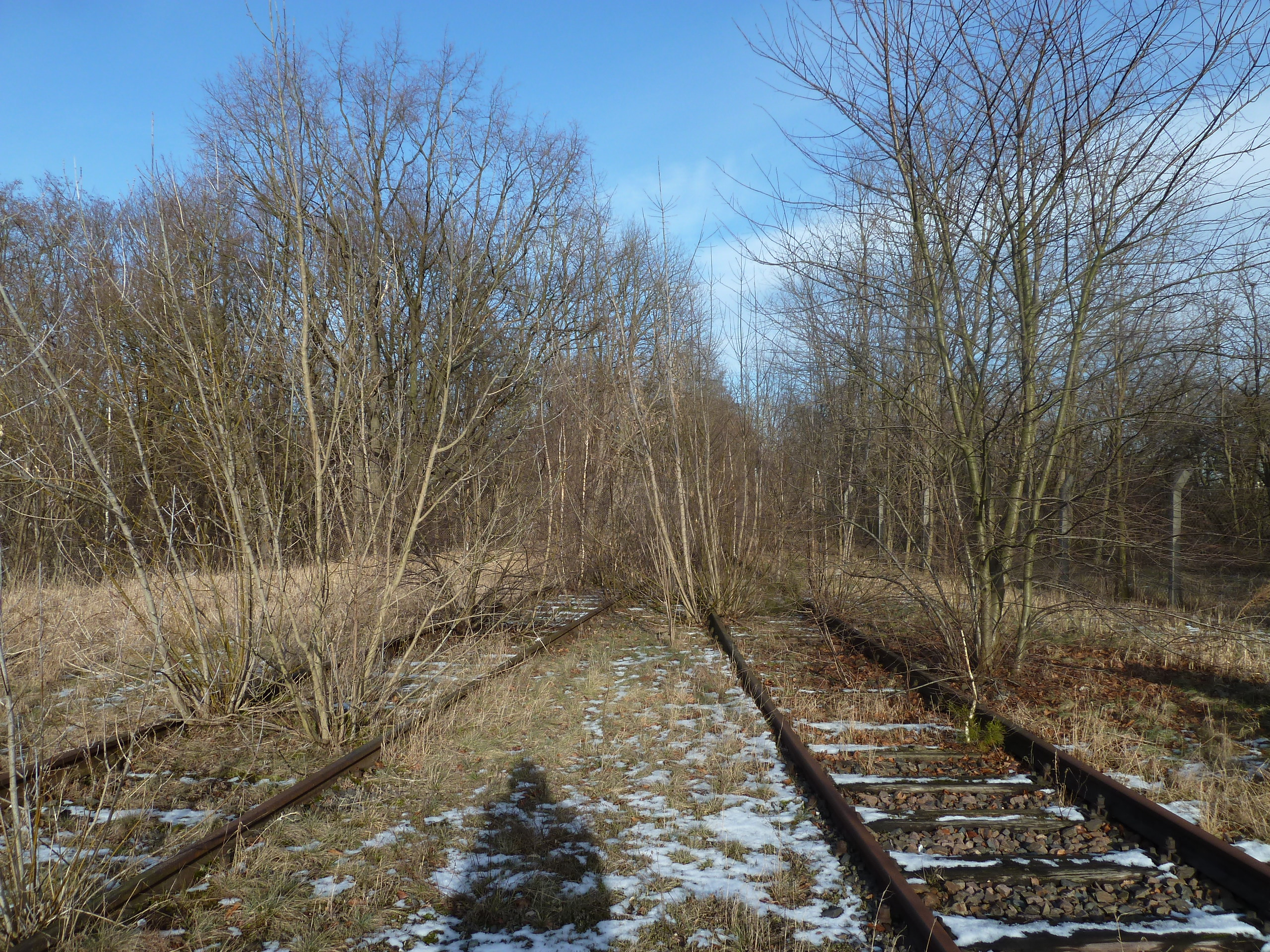
Remains of tracks in the station of the Military Railway

As a result of the divisions of Germany and Berlin, traffic flows changed. The line from Berlin via Jüterbog to Bitterfeld and continuing to Halle and Leipzig remained one of the most important lines of the GDR. Berlin was no longer reached directly over the Anhalterbahn, instead trains ran from Ludwigsfelde over the Berlin outer ring.

Operations on the light railway, which were established for passenger traffic in 1932 and for freight traffic in 1939, were resumed after 1945. One track was extended from the light railway station to the main station. The light railway operations finally ended in 1963.

Many military installations in and around Jüterbog were used by the Soviet Army after 1945. Accordingly, the station was also important for the Soviet Army. In addition to material transports, there were also military passenger trains. A separate entrance building was built in the south-west of the station for travellers to check-in.

In 1974, the station received a new relay signal box of the GS III Sp68 class, the first of its kind. It went into operation on 19 September 1974 and replaced three mechanical signal boxes. It was housed in a striking building on the north-western side of the railway tracks. Electric catenary was installed in the station on 27 May 1979. First, the line to south-west went into operation on 1 June and the line to Luckenwalde followed in 1980. In the following years, electric operations gradually increased to the Berlin outer ring and later to the north. The section from Jüterbog to Falkenberg was also electrified in September 1989.

=== Jüterbog station in reunited Germany ===
After German reunification, the withdrawal of the Soviet troops began and it was completed in 1994. Jüterbog was no longer a military base. Accordingly, the significance of the station decreased, especially as freight traffic fell sharply. The railway tracks of the station were reduced to a considerable extent. In 1999, the tracks were connected to an electronic interlocking. The signal box was thus rendered superfluous and it was closed in 2010.

In 1996, passenger services ended between Jüterbog and Sperenberg (and ended two years later on the whole route to Zossen) and freight traffic stopped between Jüterbog and Zossen. The line was closed in the same year.

The station building was sold in 2015 to a person who is considering uses for it. It stands (as of 2016) largely empty, although a ticket agency uses individual rooms of the building.

== Infrastructure ==
=== Entrance building ===
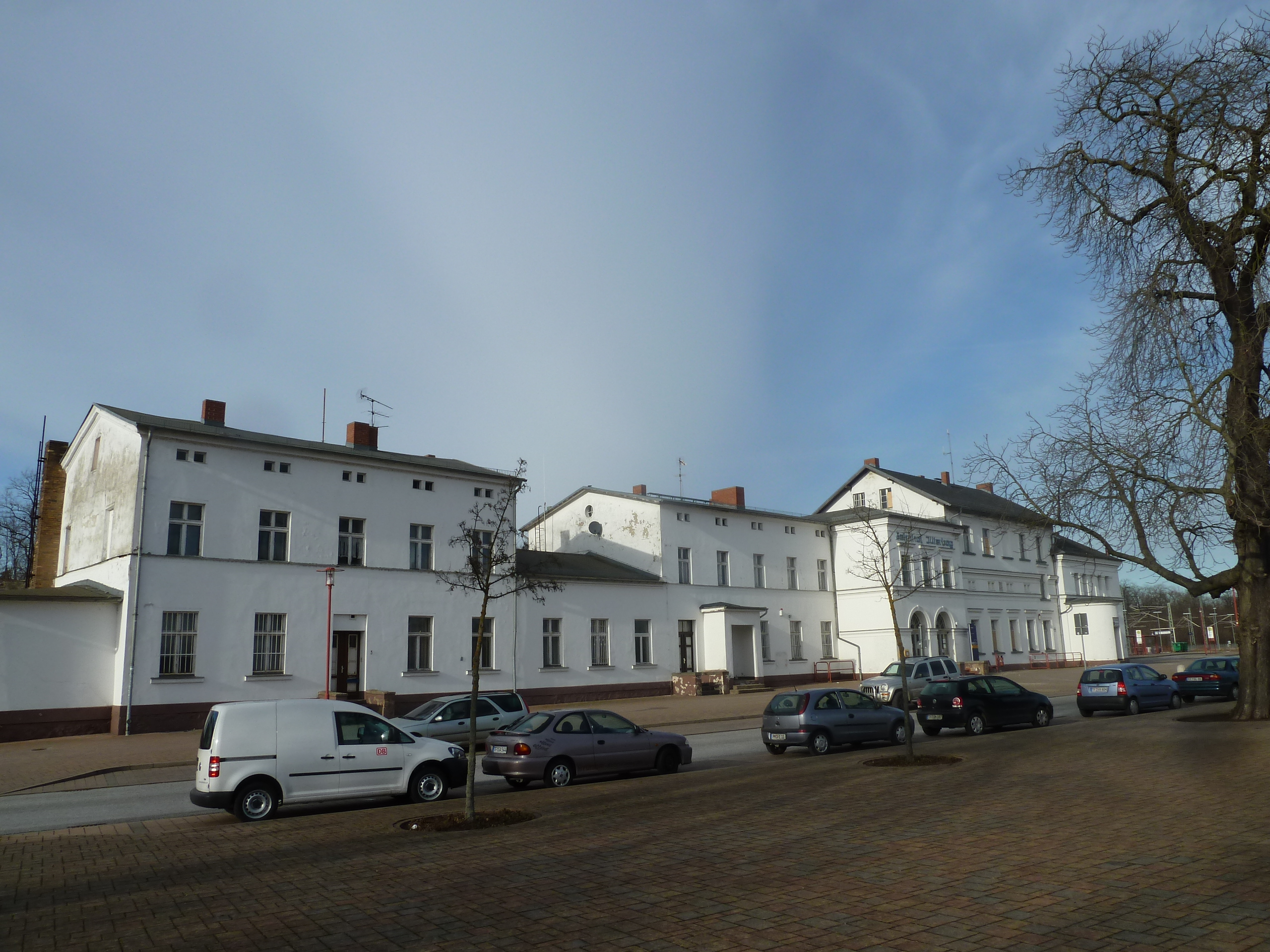
Left: the oldest part of the station building from 1841; right; additions from 1896.

The listed entrance building is a long structure consisting of the central three-storey original building of 1841 with extensions on both sides. The oldest neo-classical part of the building is one of the oldest surviving station buildings in Brandenburg. It is a symmetrical structure consisting of a three-axis one-storey middle section and two two-storey side sections with five axes each (the axes representing the vertical lines through windows and doors). All three sections have flattened pitch roofs, the side sections have avant-corps-like projections on the platform side.

The adjoining extension to the northeast, which was built in 1896, also has three sections with two two-storey side sections of three and five axes and an originally one-storey section with five axes in the middle. Both sides have entrances from the station forecourt. The section next to the old station building was used for the entrance hall, the 1st and 2nd class waiting room (later used as a restaurant) was in the middle section and the 3rd and 4th class waiting room were in the northeastern section. A second storey was added to the middle part of the extension building in 1906 to house an apartment for the station master. The entrance hall has two round arched entrance and exit doors.

In the south-west, the original section of the station building is connected to a one-storey mail handling room built in 1874.

In the heritage list, the building is acknowledged as one of the oldest surviving station buildings in the state and one of the few neo-classical buildings in the town. It shows the importance of the railway for the town's development.

=== Military Railway station ===
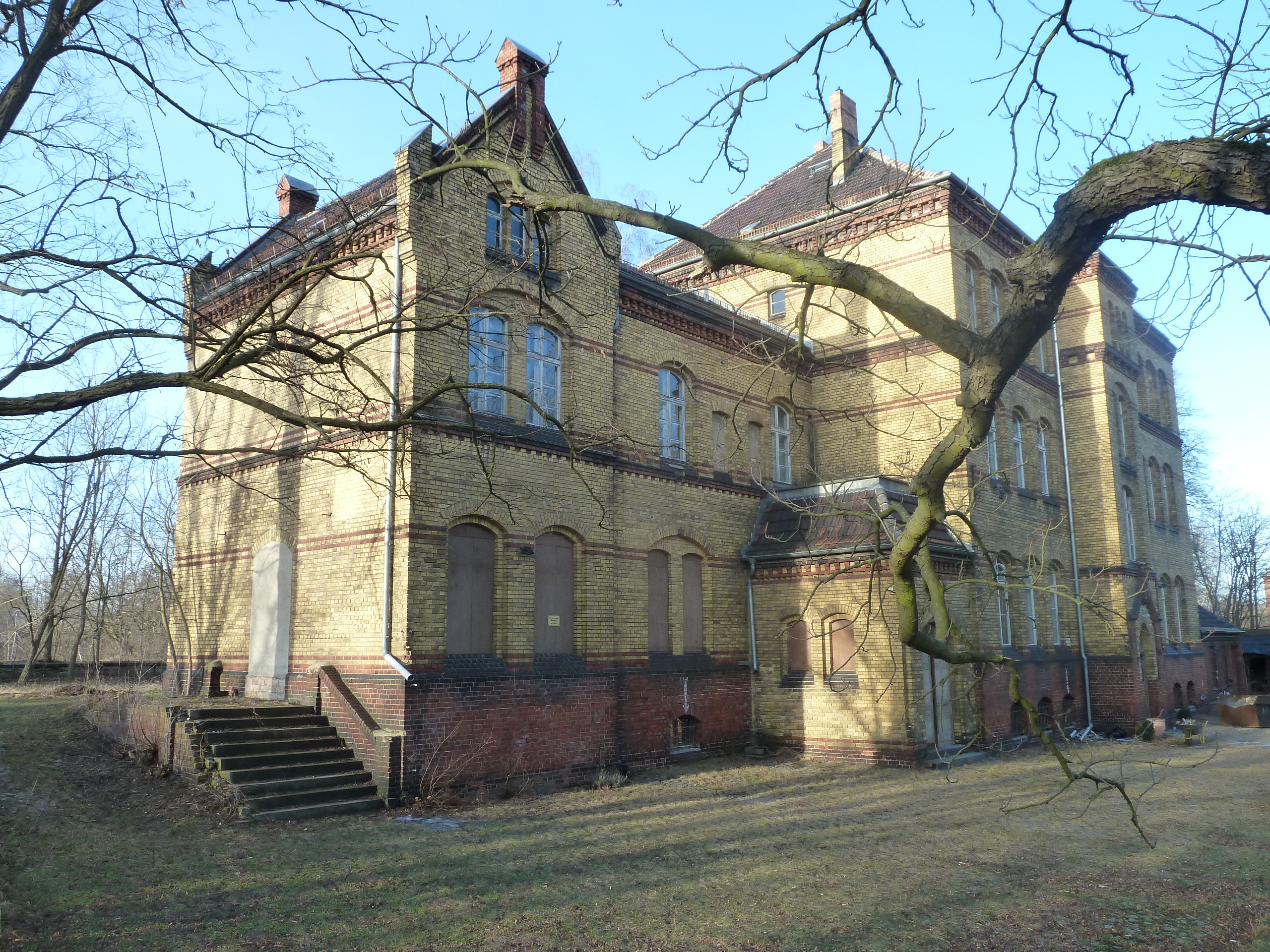
Military Railway station, entrance building, street-side.

Coordinates: 52°00′08″N 13°03′31″E

The Military Railway station is located north-east of the main station on the side of the railway tracks. Its entrance building is a three-storey yellow brick building with a two-storey extension with a display gable on the track side and a staircase to the forecourt in an avant-corps.

A separate toilet building, a one-storey half-timbered building, a red, two-storey residential building, a warehouse and yellow-brick goods shed are also protected. The design of the freight shed links with the structure elements of the station building with pedestals and ribbons of red bricks.

The station building is used privately.

=== Platforms and tracks ===
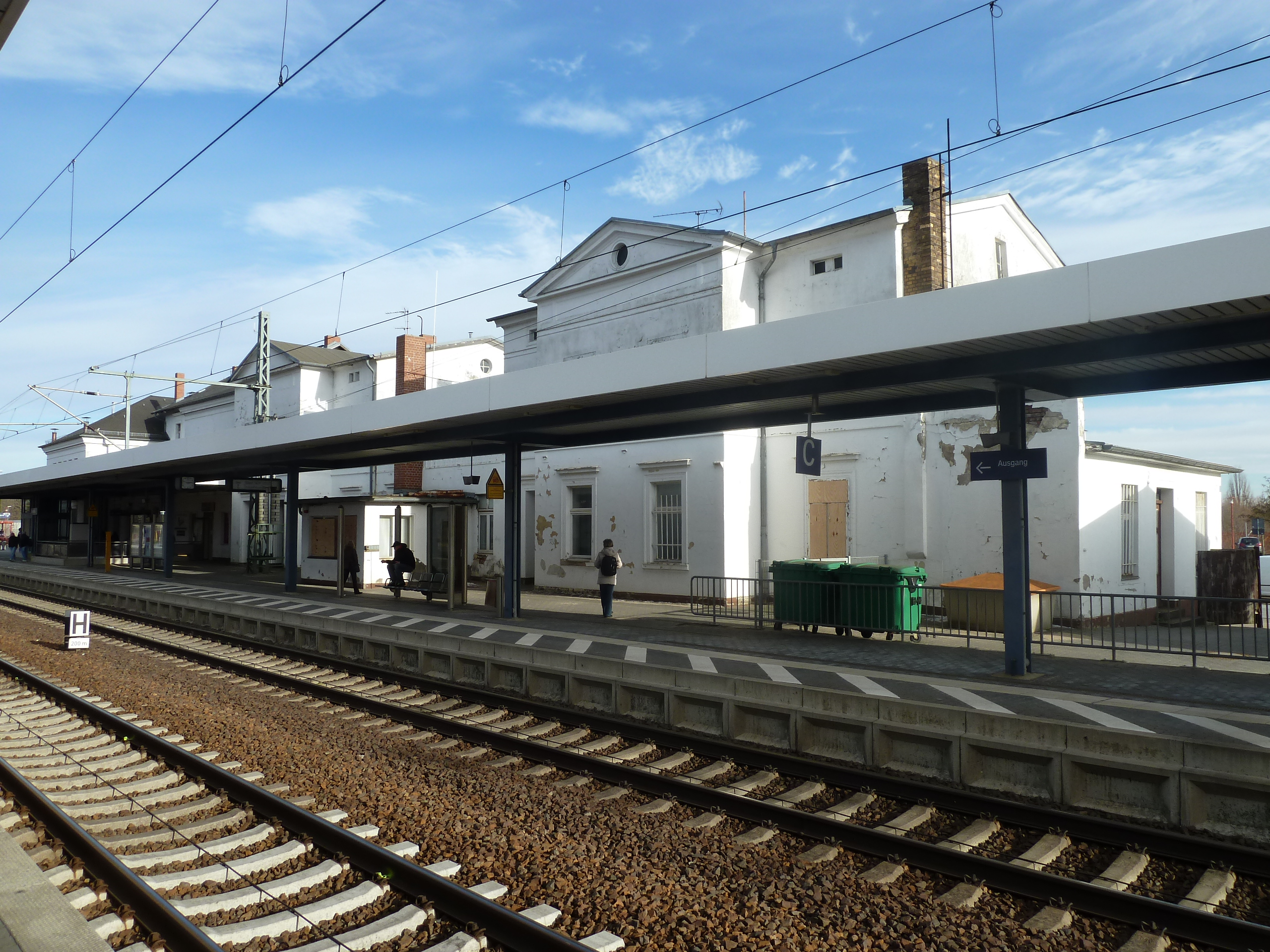
View of the "house" platform

Until the 1990s the station had the following platforms:

- a "house" platform next to the station building,
- two island platforms north-west of the platform with two platform edges each,
- a platform east of the house platform, which was a wedge-shaped bay-platform in the station forecourt, especially used for trains towards Zossen,
- a platform south-west of the station. This was also used for public passenger services, but also served passenger trains of the Soviet army. In the 1950s, a separate entrance building was built for the Soviet army. It is located on the road well below the ground level of the railway and thus had an exit to the platform on its upper floor.

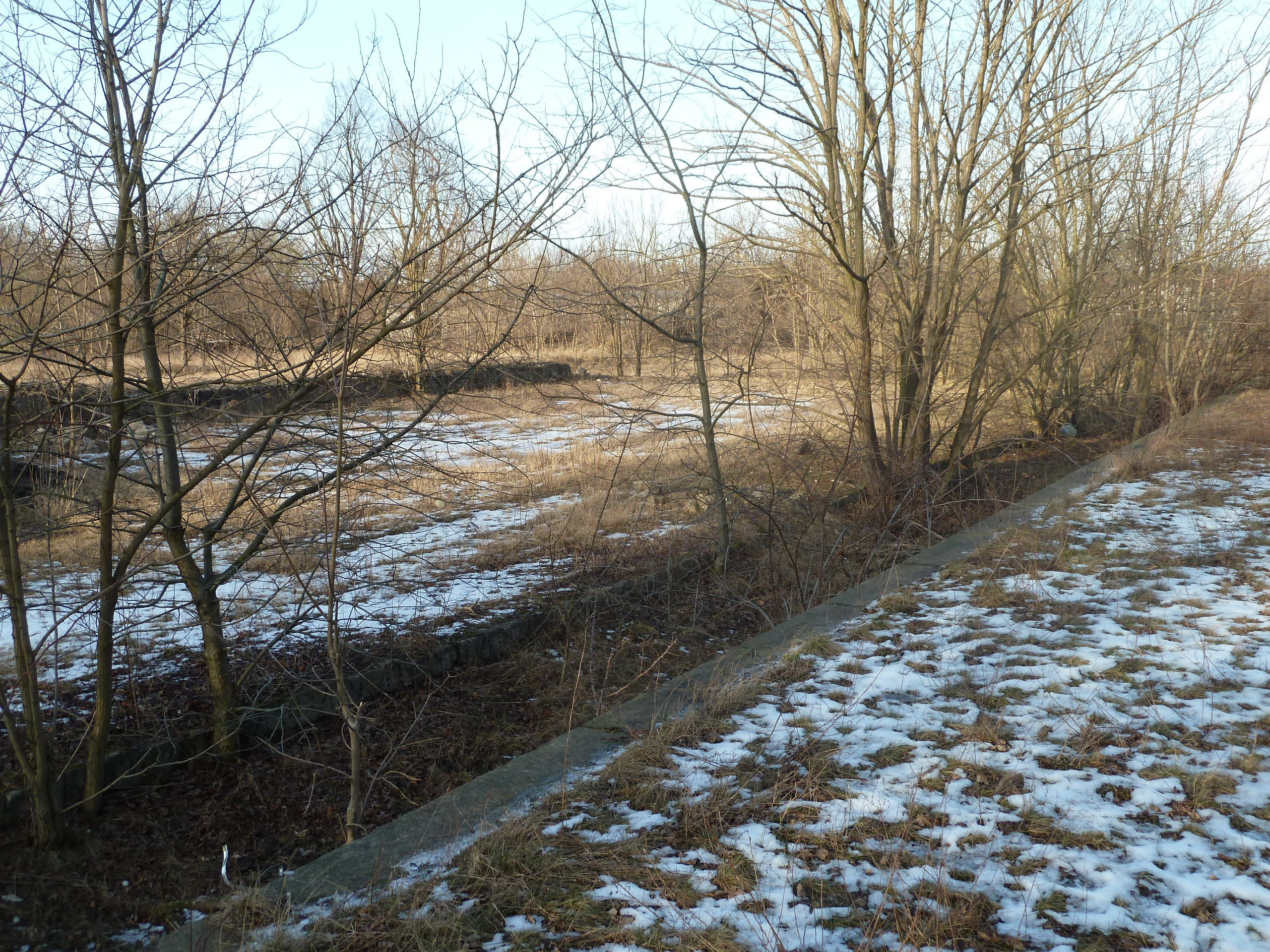
The Military Railway station remained in operation as a loading station for the Soviet army.

The once extensive facilities for freight transport and operational tasks were located to the north-east of the platform towards Berlin. In addition to the loading road, the station had other separate loading points:

- loading point I on the northeast edge of the station (Neuheimer Weg)
- loading point II in the former Military Station
- loading point III on the station forecourt

In the meantime, a large part of the facilities have been restored. Still in operation are the house platform, mainly used for trains towards Berlin, and an island platform, especially used for trains towards Wittenberg and Falkenberg as well as towards Berlin-Wannsee via Treuenbrietzen. There are still some tracks used for operations to the north-east.

The platforms are connected by a pedestrian tunnel, which also connects to the Jüterbog II district, located to the north-west of the station. A pedestrian bridge runs over the railway tracks about 500 metres northeast of the platform in the area of the military station.

=== Locomotive depot ===
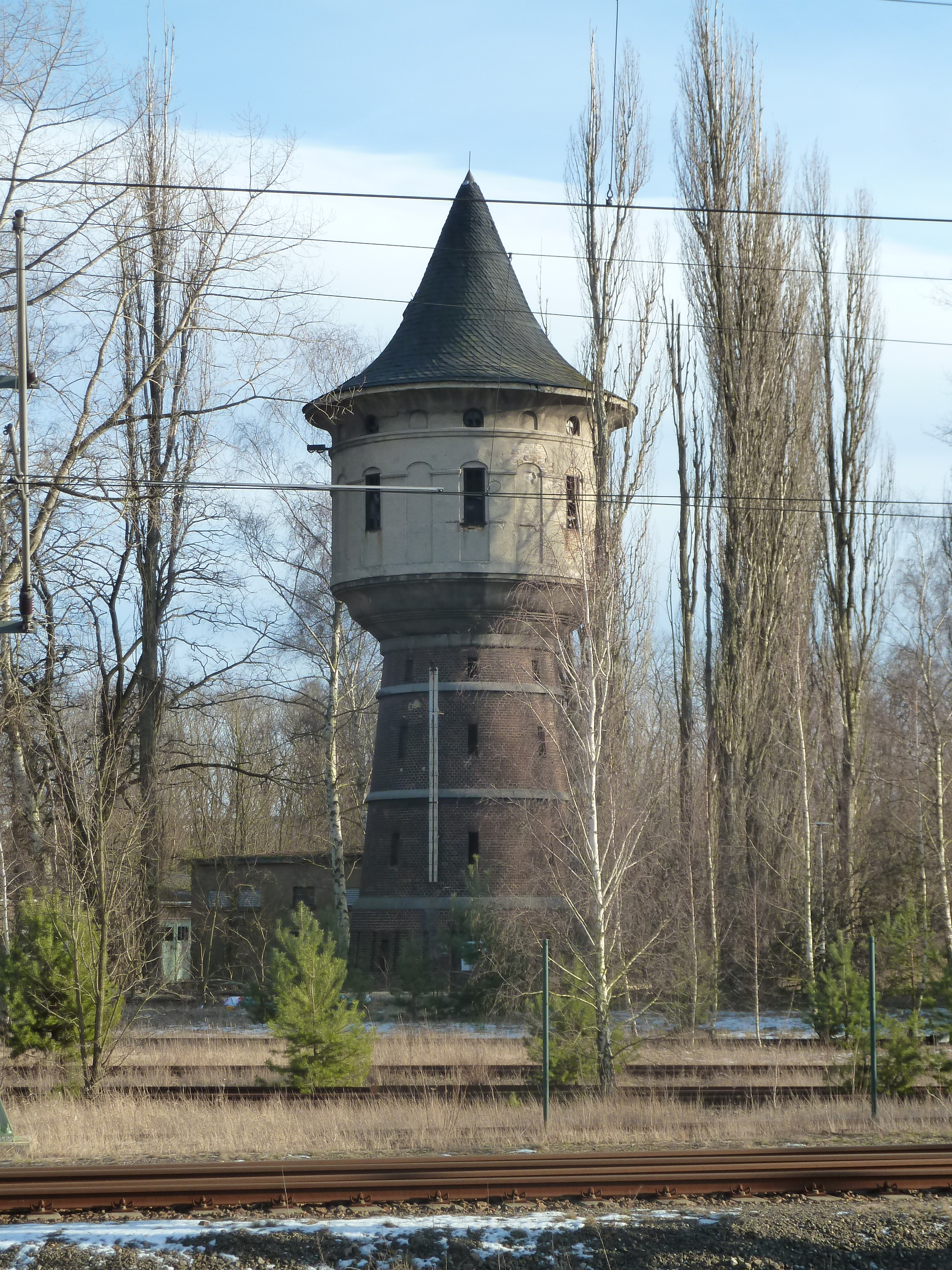
Water tower of the locomotive depot

coordinates: 52°00′22″N 13°04′04″E

The locomotive works at the branching of the lines to Berlin and Zossen was built at the beginning of the 20th century during the development of Jüterbog as a railway node. Previously Jüterbog had been only a locomotive shed. Jüterbog was run as an independent service point from around 1909, but it was not until 1924 that it formally became a separate Bahnbetriebswerk (locomotive depot). After 1990, the depot lost its importance. It was subordinated to the Seddin locomotive works in 1994 and has been completely unused since 1998.

The listed water tower, built between 1915 and 1917, is located in the western part of the site. It is a red-brick building, tapering upwards, with a reservoir room with wrought-iron decorations. Its technical equipment was maintained even after the end of its use as a water tower. The heritage-listed monument is one of the few preserved technical monuments in Jüterbog.

The monograph discussing the heritage value of the sites also covers the semi-circular roundhouse, with ten stalls, from 1914 and an administration building from the 1950s. These buildings, however, were not on the monuments list of the state. The depot's old buildings, with the exception of the water tower, were demolished in 2016.

== Passenger services ==
=== Rail ===
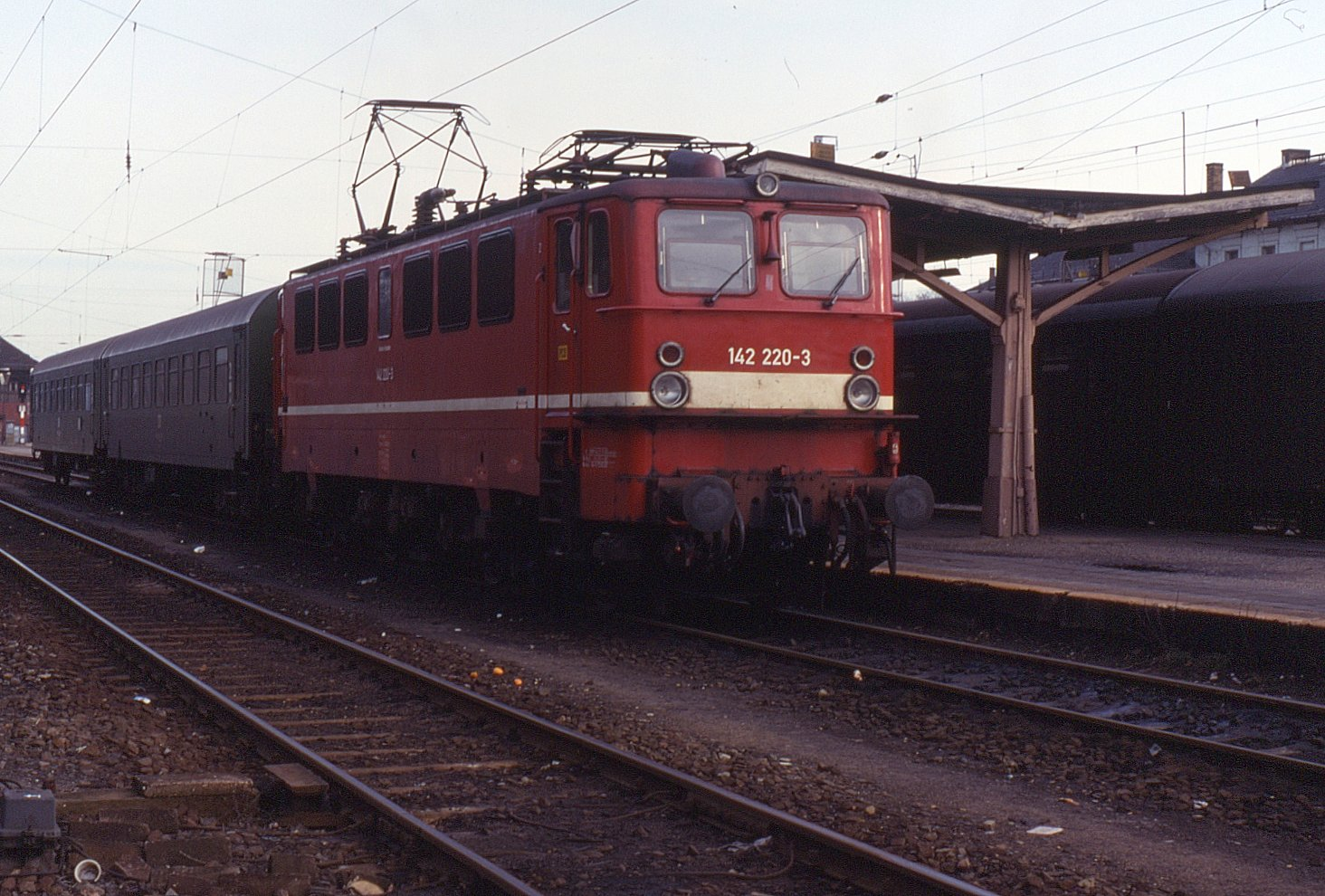
Passenger train to Falkenberg (Elster) at Jüterbog station, 1993

At the end of the 1990s, Jüterbog Station was a stop for long-distance services. However, for several decades, from the end of the 19th century to the beginning of the 1990s, only some of the many Durchgangszug (express trains) running on the line stopped at the station. Added to this were stopping passenger trains, including on the branch lines. During the GDR period, a passenger train ran from Jüterbog via Zossen and Erkner to Frankfurt (Oder) that was not available for use by the general public. This train was only to be used by members of the Soviet Army. At the beginning of the 1990s, this train service was cancelled.

In 1995 the station was served by the following lines:

| Line | Route | Interval (min) |
|---|---|---|
| IR | (Stralsund –) Berlin-Lichtenberg – Jüterbog – Halle (Saale) Hauptbahnhof – Frankfurt (Main) Hauptbahnhof | 120 |
| RE 3 | (Stralsund –) Berlin-Lichtenberg – Jüterbog – Falkenberg (Elster) – Ruhland – Cottbus station | 120 |
| RB 31 | Schönefeld Airport – Zossen – Jüterbog | 120 |
| RB 33 | Potsdam Stadt – Beelitz Stadt – Jüterbog | 120 |
| RB | Jüterbog – Lutherstadt Wittenberg– Halle (Saale) Hauptbahnhof | 120 |

Traffic to Zossen was discontinued in 1996. InterRegio services were transferred to the Dessau–Berlin line in 1999. But an Intercity service ran between Lutherstadt Wittenberg and Berlin that did not stop in Jüterbog. For a year there was an InterRegio train pair between Berlin and Oberstdorf, with a stop in Jüterbog, which was discontinued in 2000. Since then, no long-distance services have stopped at Jüterbog station. Instead, the regional train service has been consolidated. Since 1999, Regional-Express services have been running between Berlin and Jüterbog every hour, with the routes changing over the years. Since 2006, Jüterbog has been connected directly to the inner city of Berlin via a restored section of the Anhalterbahn so that the detour via Schönefeld is no longer required.

The station was served by the following services in 2026:

| Line | Route | Interval (min) |
|---|---|---|
| RE 3 | Schwedt (Oder) / Stralsund – Angermünde – Eberswalde – Berlin – Jüterbog – Lutherstadt Wittenberg | 60 |
| RE 4 | (Falkenberg (Elster) –) Jüterbog – Ludwigsfelde – Berlin Potsdamer Platz – Berlin – Berlin-Spandau – Dallgow-Döberitz – Wustermark – Rathenow (– Stendal) | 60 |
| RB 33 | Berlin-Wannsee – Beelitz Stadt – Jüterbog | 60 |
| S 2 S 8 | Jüterbog – Zahna – Lutherstadt Wittenberg – Gräfenhainichen – Bitterfeld – Leipzig/Halle | Some trains |

=== Other transport ===
Bus routes connect the station with the bus station in the town centre and with Treuenbrietzen.

Jüterbog station is the starting point for journeys on the Flaeming-Skate (a path for cycles, skateboards etc.), which run for a few hundred metres north of the station. The Berlin–Leipzig cycle route also runs through the station. The Tour Brandenburg and two of Brandenburg's "Historic city core" (Historische Stadtkerne) cycle routes run on the southeast side of the station.
