= Gadebusch station =

Railway station in Gadebusch, Germany

Gadebusch
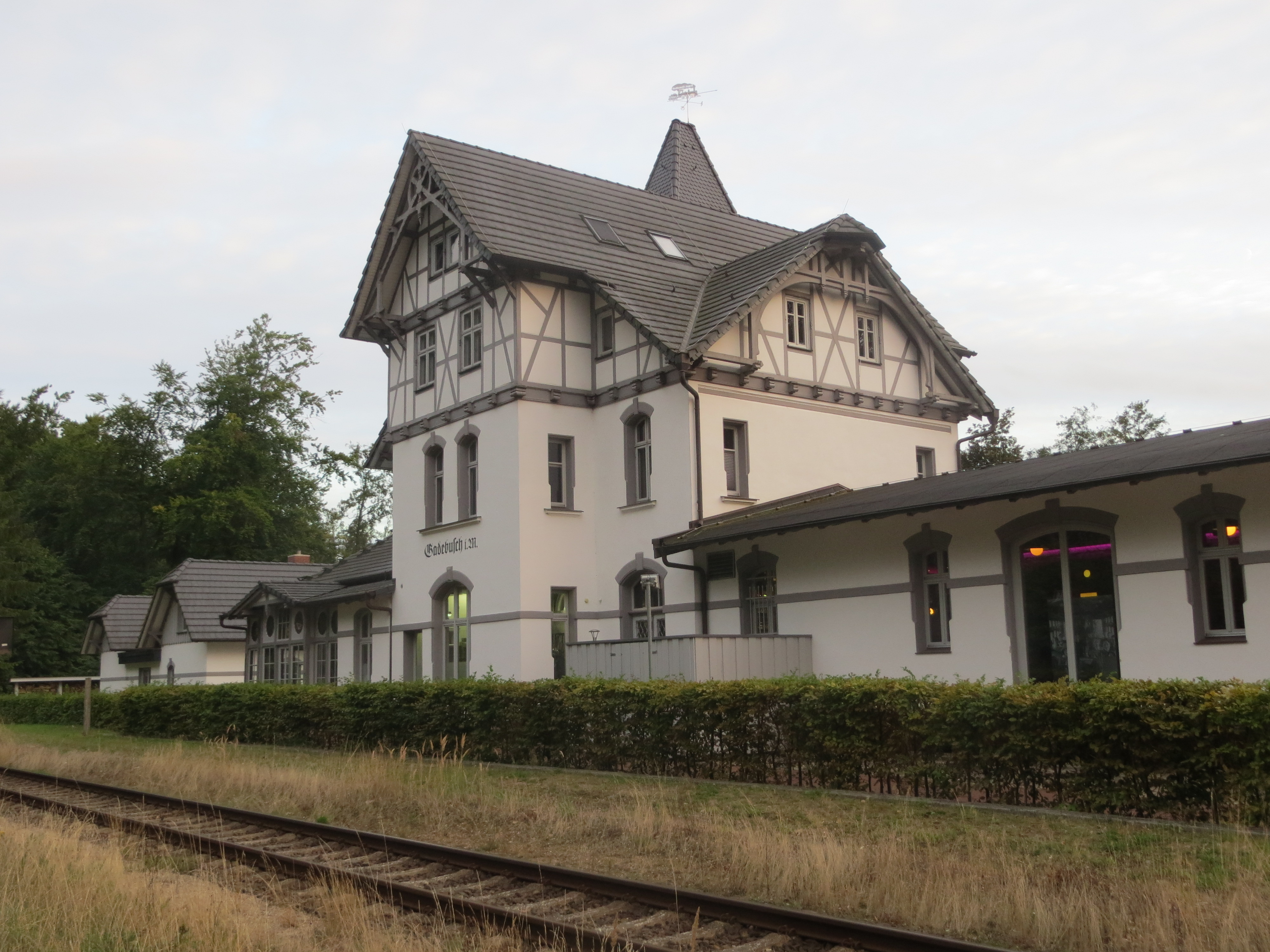
- 2018

General information
- Location: Bahnhof; 19205 Gadebusch; Mecklenburg-Vorpommern; Germany
- Coordinates: 53.7040°N 11.1215°E
- System: Hp
- Owner: Deutsche Bahn
- Operator: DB Station&Service
- Lines: Schwerin–Rehna railway (KBS 152)
- Platforms: 1 side platform
- Tracks: 1
- Train operators: ODEG
- Connections: RB 13

Construction
- Parking: yes
- Cycle facilities: yes
- Accessible: yes

Other information
- Station code: 1994
- DS100 code: WGA
- IBNR: 8011592
- Category: 7
- Website: www.bahnhof.de

History
- Opened: 12 October 1897; 128 years ago

Services
Preceding station	Ostdeutsche Eisenbahn	Following station
Holdorf (Meckl) towards Rehna	RB 13	Lützow towards Parchim
Location
- Location within Mecklenburg-Vorpommern Location within Germany Location within Europe

Gadebusch station is a railway station in the municipality of Gadebusch, located in the Nordwestmecklenburg district in Mecklenburg-Vorpommern, Germany.
