= Crivitz station =

Railway station in Crivitz, Germany

Crivitz
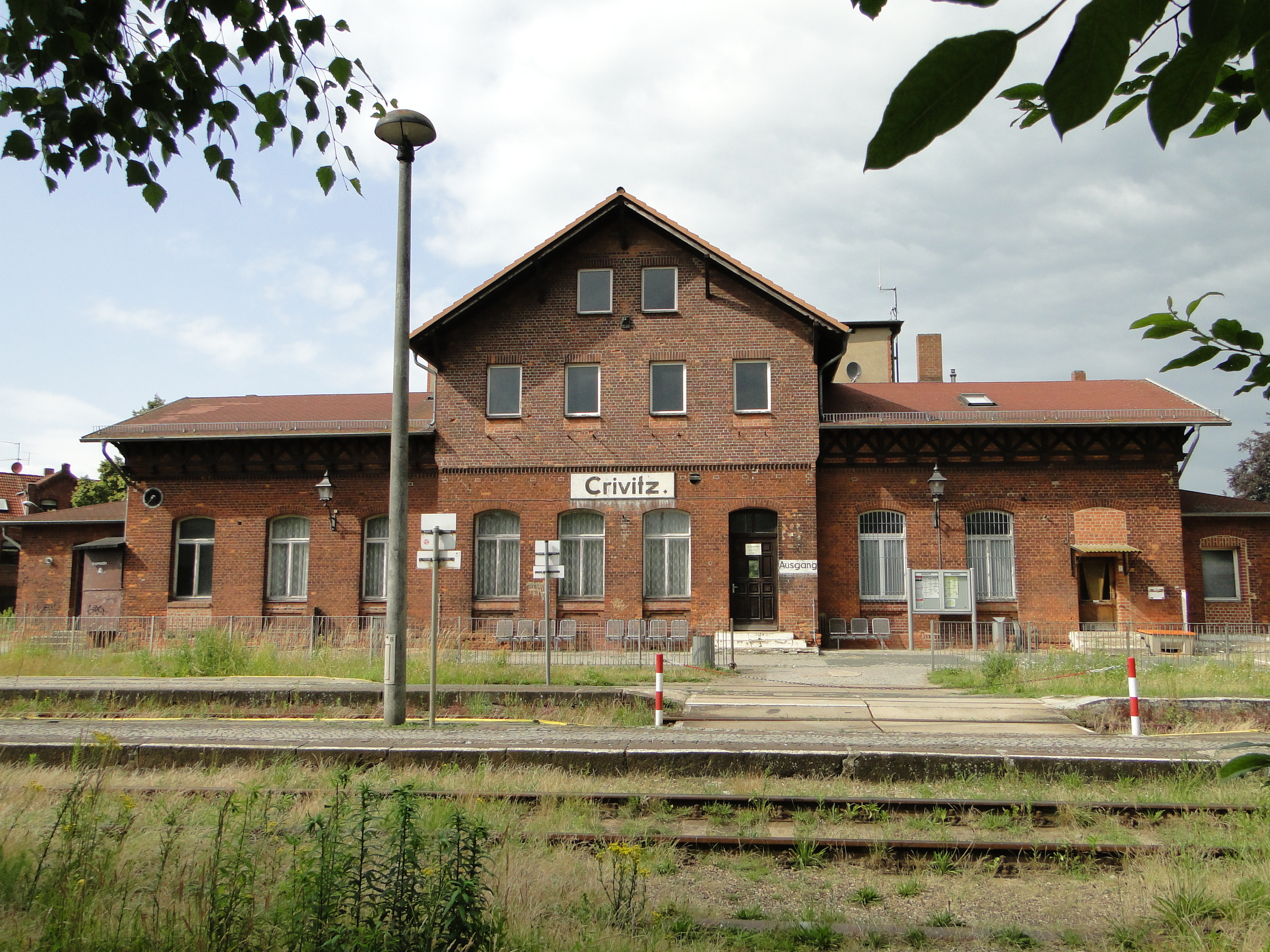
- 2013

General information
- Location: Am Bahnhof 11; 19089 Crivitz; Mecklenburg-Vorpommern; Germany
- Coordinates: 53.5726°N 11.6455°E
- System: Bf
- Owner: Deutsche Bahn
- Operator: DB Netz; DB Station&Service
- Lines: Schwerin–Parchim railway (KBS 152)
- Platforms: 1 island platform
- Tracks: 2
- Train operators: ODEG
- Connections: RB 13

Construction
- Parking: yes
- Cycle facilities: yes
- Accessible: yes

Other information
- Station code: 1086
- DS100 code: WCZ
- IBNR: 8011326
- Category: 6
- Website: www.bahnhof.de

History
- Opened: 2 September 1888; 137 years ago

Services
Preceding station	Ostdeutsche Eisenbahn	Following station
Sukow (b Schwerin towards Rehna	RB 13	Ruthenbeck towards Parchim
Location
- Location within Mecklenburg-Vorpommern Location within Germany Location within Europe

Crivitz station is a railway station in the municipality of Crivitz, located in the Ludwigslust-Parchim district in Mecklenburg-Vorpommern, Germany.
