= Saatel station =

Railway station in Germany

Saatel

General information
- Location: Saatel, MV, Germany
- Coordinates: 54°18′01″N 12°46′21″E
- Line: Velgast-Barth railway
- Platforms: 1
- Tracks: 1
- Train operators: DB Regio Nordost

History
- Opened: before 1928
- Electrified: 2 June 1991; 35 years ago till 2005

Services
Preceding station	DB Regio Nordost	Following station
Velgast Terminus	RB 25	Kenz towards Barth
Location
- Location within Mecklenburg-Vorpommern Location within Germany Location within Europe

Saatel (German: Bahnhof Saatel) is a railway station in the village of Saatel, Mecklenburg-Vorpommern, Germany. The station lies on the Velgast-Barth railway and the train services are operated by Deutsche Bahn.

== Train services ==
The station is served by the following service:

- regional service RB 25 (DB Regio Nordost) Barth - Kenz - Saatel - Velgast
