= WKG =

WKG may stand for:

- Workington railway station, Cumbria, England, station code WKG
- Walkergate Metro station, Newcastle upon Tyne, England, station code WKG
- Kratzeburg station, Mecklenburg-Vorpommern, Germany, DS100 code WKG
- WKG-TV, later TV station KBTR-CD
