= Kratzeburg station =

Railway station in Germany

Kratzeburg
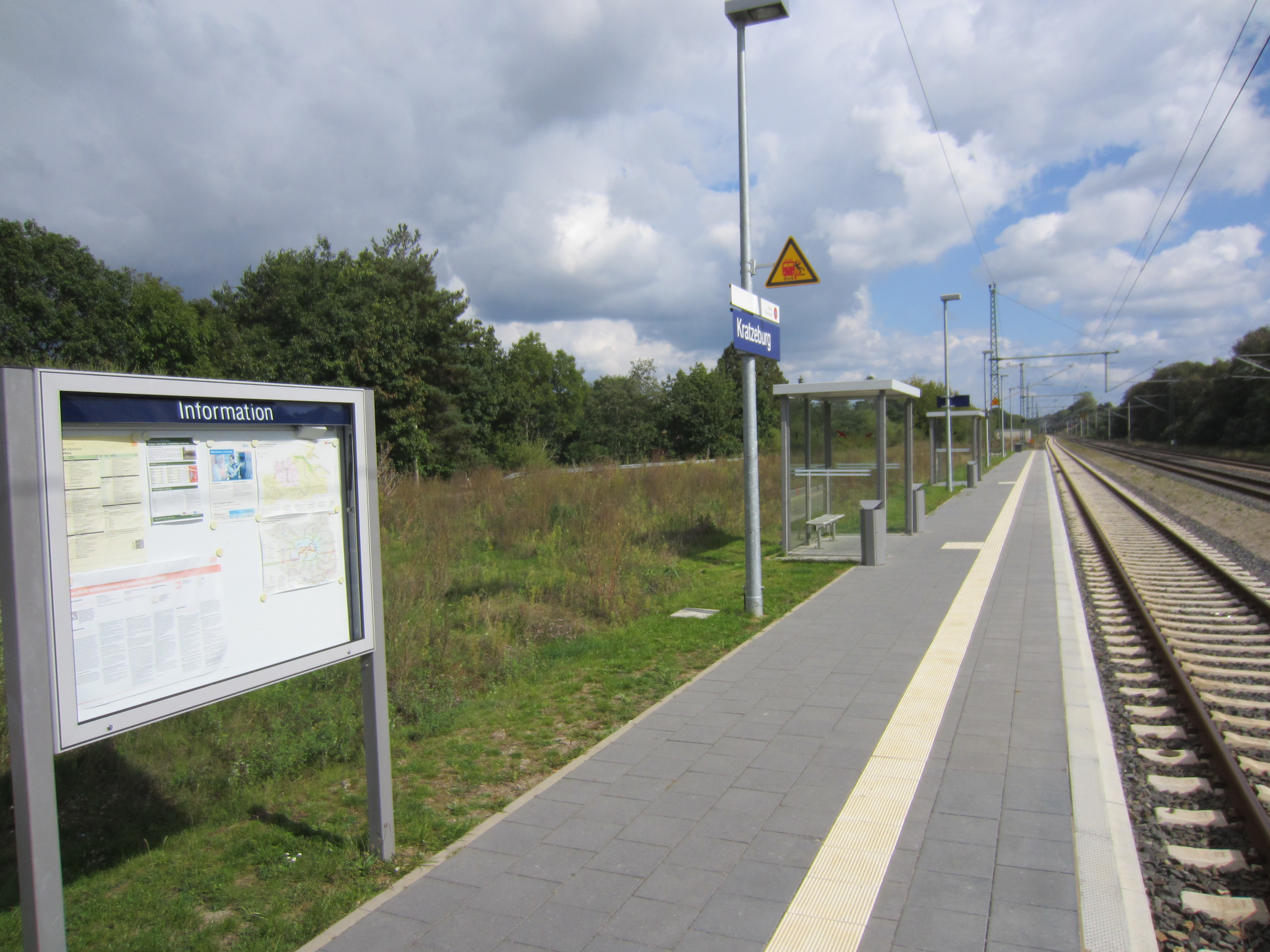
- 2014

General information
- Location: Dorfstraße 25; 17237 Kratzeburg; Mecklenburg-Vorpommern; Germany
- Coordinates: 53°25′40″N 12°56′32″E
- Owner: Deutsche Bahn
- Operator: DB Station&Service
- Lines: Neustrelitz–Warnemünde railway (KBS 205)
- Platforms: 1 side platform
- Tracks: 3
- Train operators: DB Regio Nordost

Other information
- Station code: 3399
- DS100 code: WKG
- IBNR: 8012093
- Category: 7
- Website: www.bahnhof.de

History
- Opened: 10 June 1886; 140 years ago
- Electrified: 2 June 1984; 42 years ago

Services
Preceding station	DB Regio Nordost	Following station
Waren (Müritz) towards Rostock Hbf	RE 5	Neustrelitz Hbf towards Berlin Südkreuz
Waren (Müritz) towards Rostock Hbf	RE 50	Neustrelitz Hbf Terminus
Location
- Location within Mecklenburg-Vorpommern Location within Germany Location within Europe

Kratzeburg station is a railway station in the municipality of Kratzeburg, located in the Mecklenburgische Seenplatte district in Mecklenburg-Vorpommern, Germany.
