= Kenz station =

Railway station in Kenz-Küstrow, Germany

Kenz

General information
- Location: Kenz-Küstrow, MV, Germany
- Coordinates: 54°19′43″N 12°44′28″E
- Line: Velgast-Barth railway
- Platforms: 1
- Tracks: 1
- Train operators: DB Regio Nordost
- Connections: RB 25

History
- Opened: before 1928

Services
Preceding station	DB Regio Nordost	Following station
Saatel towards Velgast	RB 25	Barth Terminus
Location

Kenz (German: Bahnhof Kenz) is a railway station in the village of Kenz-Küstrow, Mecklenburg-Vorpommern, Germany. The station lies on the Velgast-Barth railway and the train services are operated by Deutsche Bahn.

== Train services ==
The station is served by the following service:

- regional service RB 25 (DB Regio Nordost) Barth - Kenz - Saatel - Velgast
