= Fangschleuse station =

Train station in Brandenburg, Germany

Fangschleuse
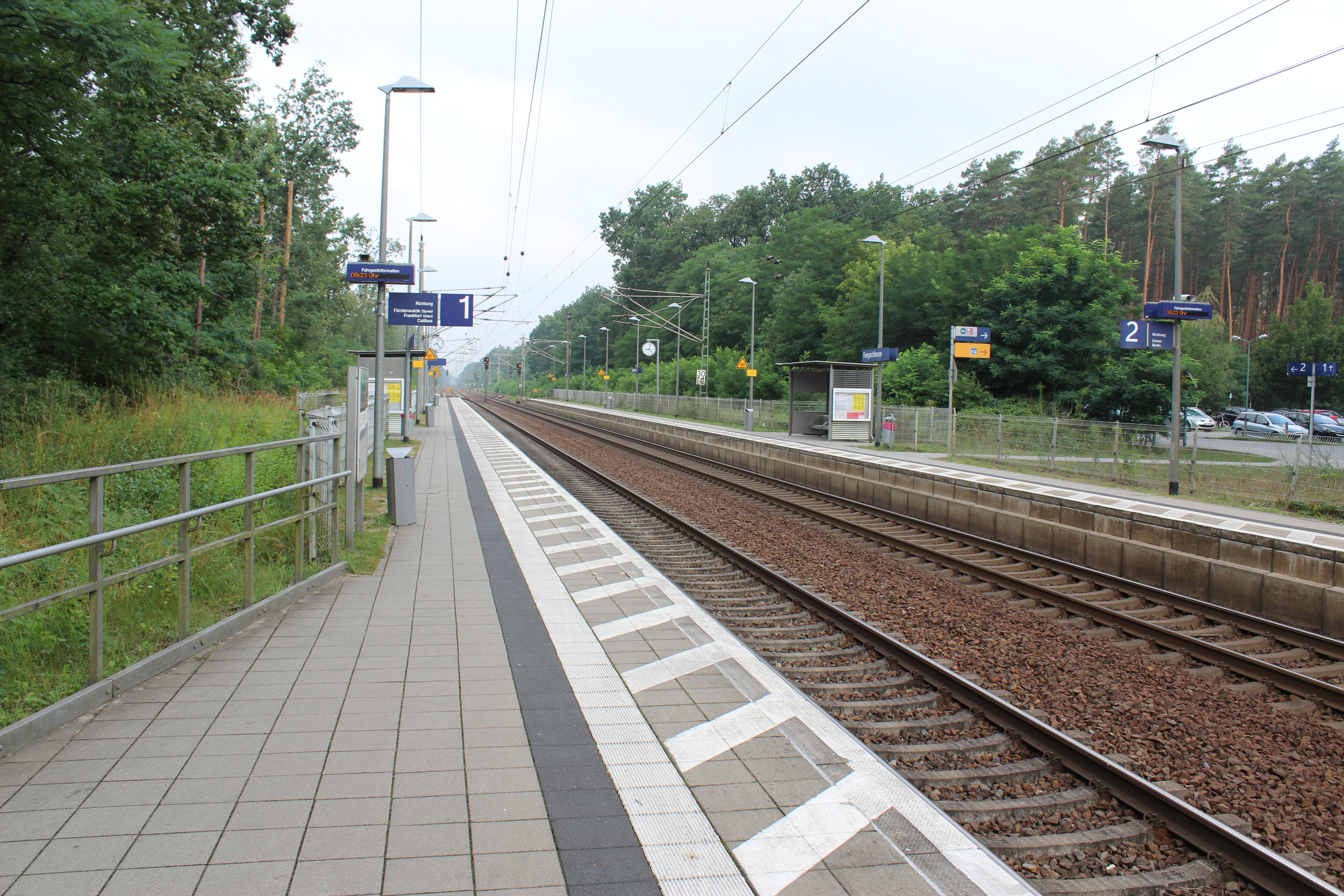
- Fangschleuse railway station in 2019

General information
- Location: Fangschleuse, Brandenburg, Germany
- Coordinates: 52°24′25″N 13°49′29″E
- Owner: Deutsche Bahn
- Operator: DB Station&Service
- Platforms: 2 side platforms
- Tracks: 2

Other information
- Fare zone: VBB: Berlin C/5762
- Website: www.bahnhof.de

Services
Preceding station	Ostdeutsche Eisenbahn	Following station
Erkner towards Brandenburg Hbf	RE 1	Hangelsberg towards Frankfurt (Oder)
Erkner towards Magdeburg Hbf	RE 1	Fürstenwalde (Spree) towards Cottbus Hbf
Location
- Location within Brandenburg

Fangschleuse railway station is a railway station serving Grünheide (Mark) and Freienbrink, in the State of Brandenburg, Germany. The station is located on the Berlin–Wrocław railway (now servicing Frankfurt (Oder) station to Warsaw, not Wrocław). The train services are operated by Deutsche Bahn. The plan is to move the train station closer to the Gigafactory Berlin-Brandenburg by the end of 2026 and to enlarge it.

== Train services ==
The station is served by the following service(s):

- Regional services RE 1 Magdeburg – Brandenburg – Potsdam – Berlin – Erkner – Fürstenwalde – Frankfurt (Oder) (– Cottbus)
