= Bad Saarow station =

Railway station in Bad Saarow, Germany

Bad Saarow
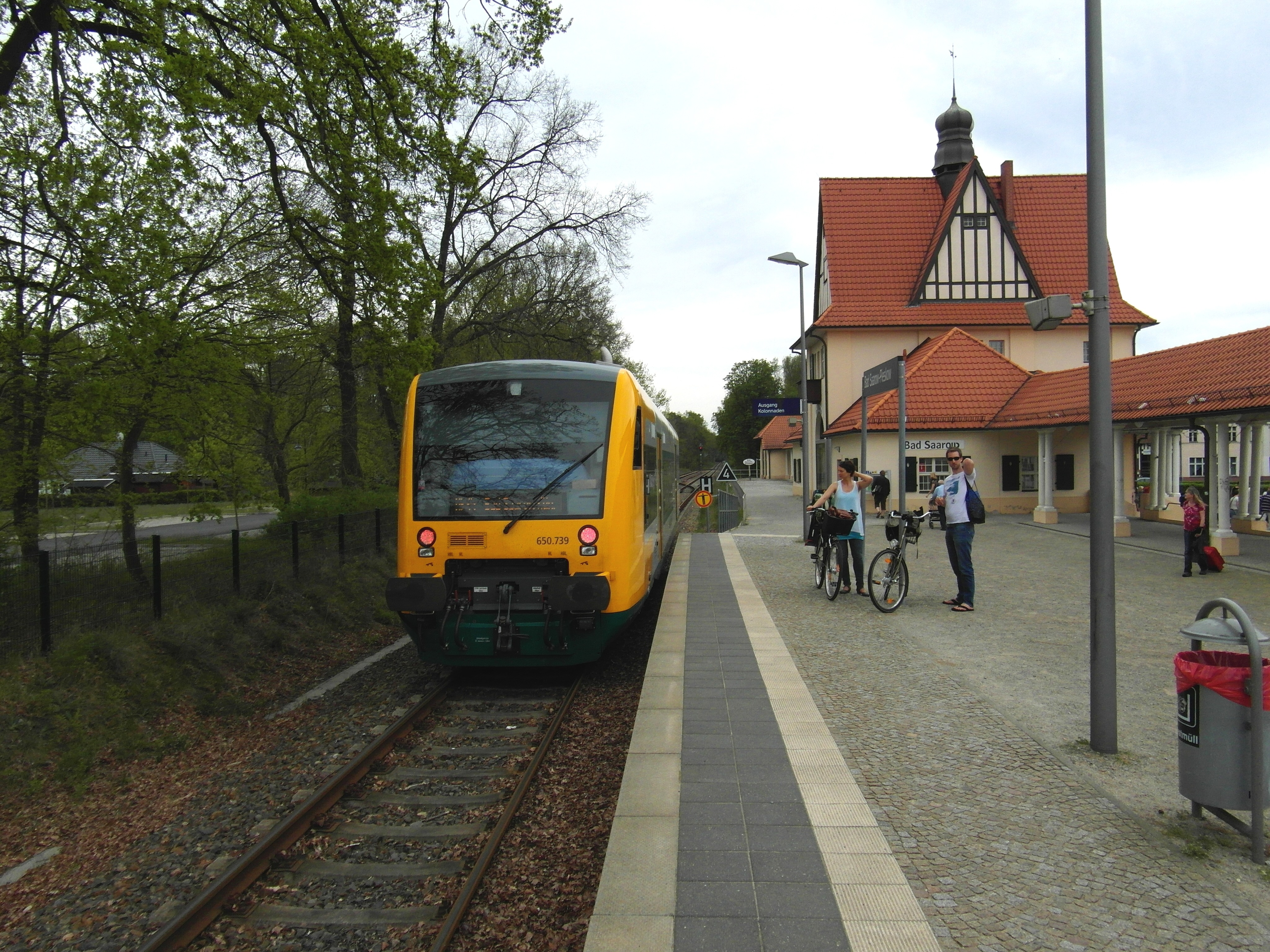

General information
- Location: Bahnhofsvorplatz 4; 15526 Bad Saarow-Pieskow; Brandenburg; Germany
- Coordinates: 52.2932°N 14.0647°E
- Owner: DB Netz
- Operator: DB Station&Service
- Line: Fürstenwalde–Beeskow
- Platforms: 1
- Tracks: 1
- Train operators: Niederbarnimer Eisenbahn

Other information
- Station code: 324
- DS100 code: BBSP
- IBNR: 8011079
- Category: 7
- Fare zone: : 6066
- Website: www.bahnhof.de

History
- Opened: 11 November 1911; 114 years ago

Services
| Preceding station | Niederbarnimer Eisenbahn | Following station |
|---|---|---|
| Fürstenwalde (Spree) Süd towards Fürstenwalde (Spree) | RB 35 | Bad Saarow Klinikum towards Bad Saarow-Pieskow |
Location
- Location within Brandenburg Location within Germany Location within Europe

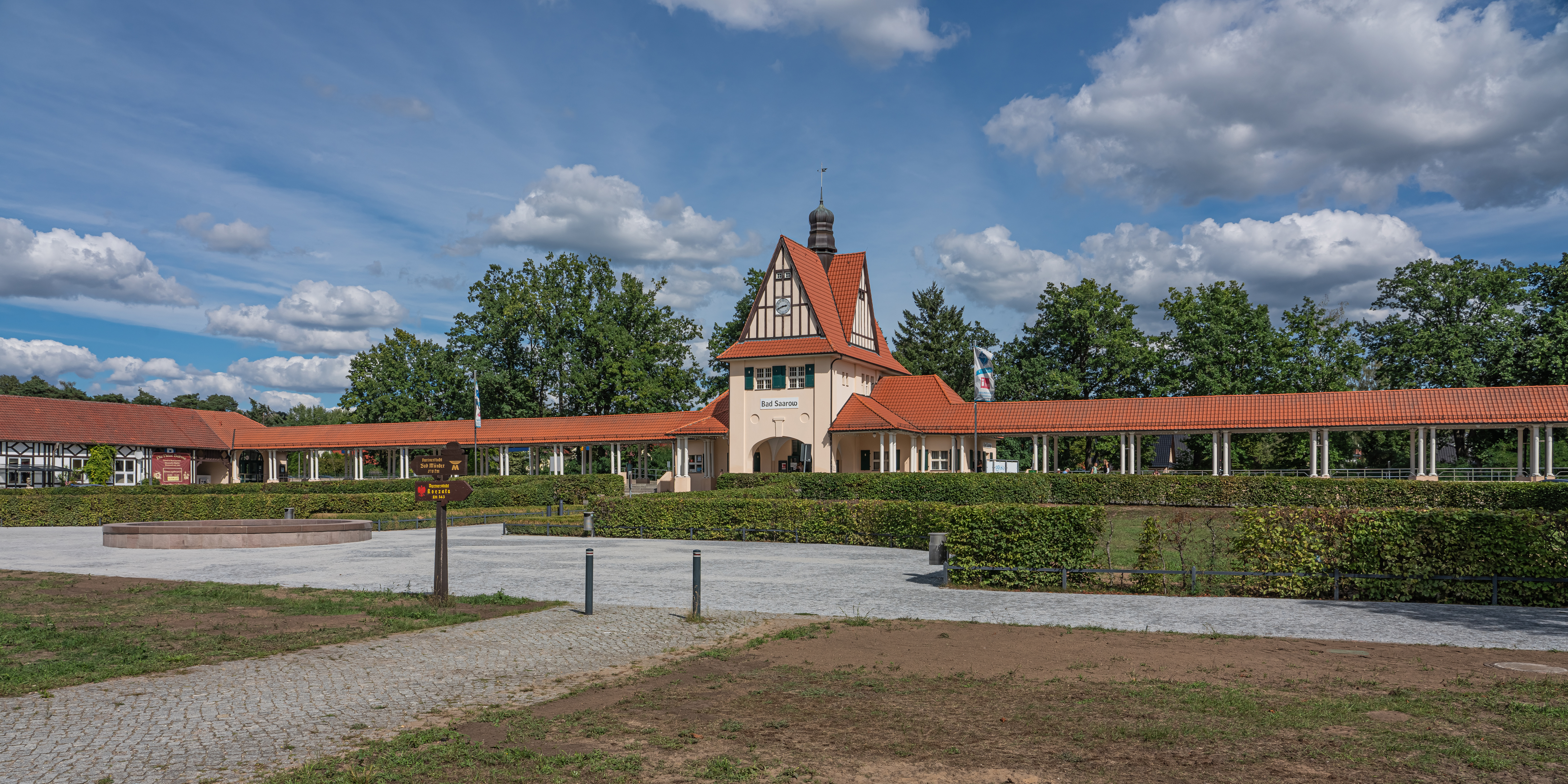
Bad Saarow station

Bad Saarow station is a railway station in the municipality of Bad Saarow in the district Oder-Spree of Brandenburg. It is served by the line RB 35.
