= Fürstenwalde (Spree) Süd station =

Railway station in Fürstenwalde, Germany

Fürstenwalde (Spree) Süd
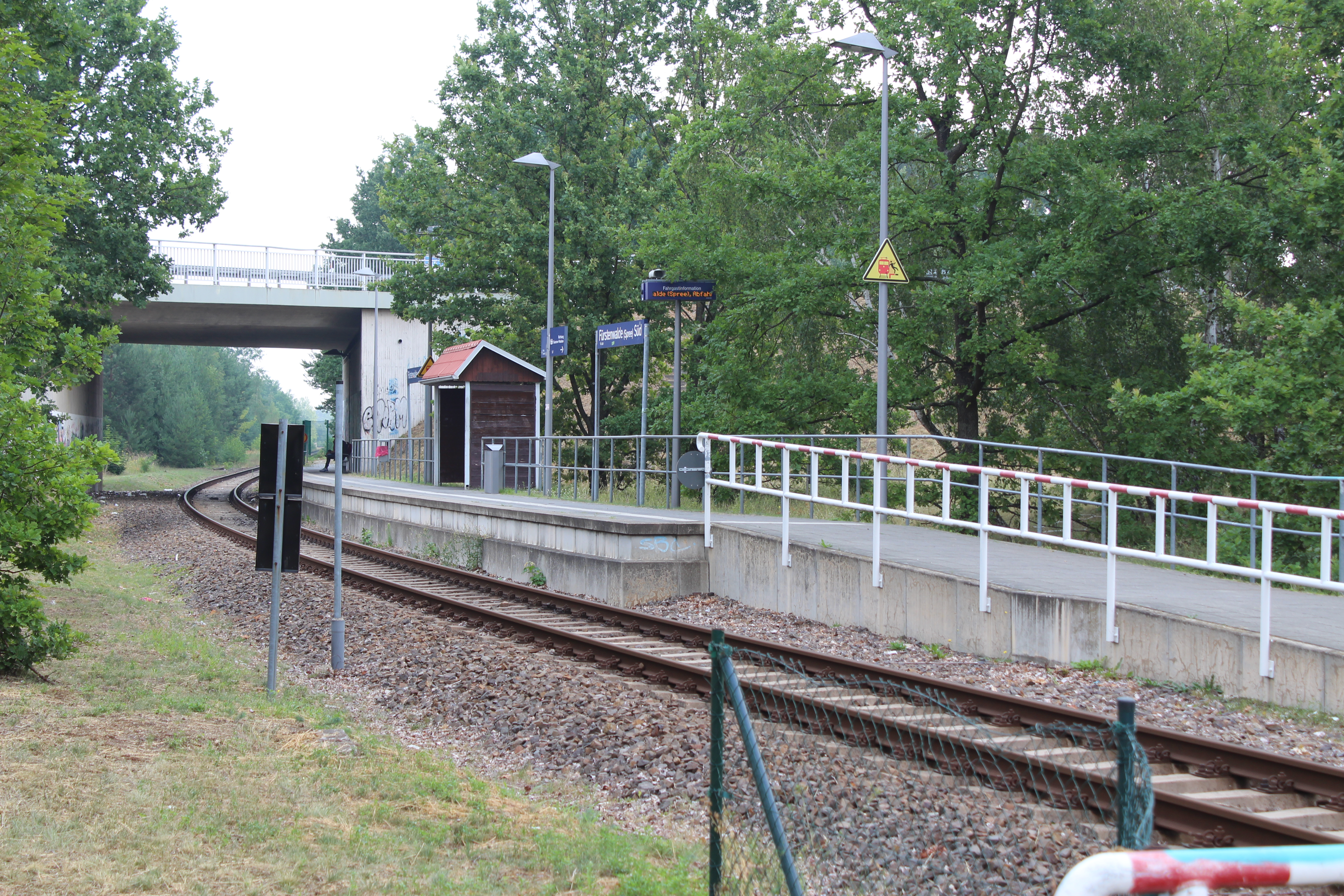
- 2019

General information
- Location: Bahnhofstraße; 15517 Fürstenwalde (Spree); Brandenburg; Germany
- Coordinates: 52.3418°N 14.0865°E
- System: Hp
- Owner: Deutsche Bahn
- Operator: DB Station&Service
- Lines: Fürstenwalde–Beeskow District Railway (KBS 209.35)
- Platforms: 1 side platform
- Tracks: 1
- Train operators: NEB
- Connections: RB 35

Other information
- Station code: 1981
- DS100 code: BFUS
- IBNR: 8011591
- Category: 7
- Fare zone: VBB: 5866
- Website: www.bahnhof.de

History
- Opened: 2 July 1911

Services
Preceding station	Niederbarnimer Eisenbahn	Following station
Fürstenwalde (Spree) Terminus	RB 35	Bad Saarow towards Bad Saarow-Pieskow
Location
- Location within Brandenburg Location within Germany Location within Europe

Fürstenwalde (Spree) Süd station is a railway station in the municipality of Fürstenwalde (Spree) in the district Oder-Spree of Brandenburg. It is served by the line RB 35.
