= Bad Saarow Klinikum station =

Railway station in Germany

Bad Saarow Klinikum
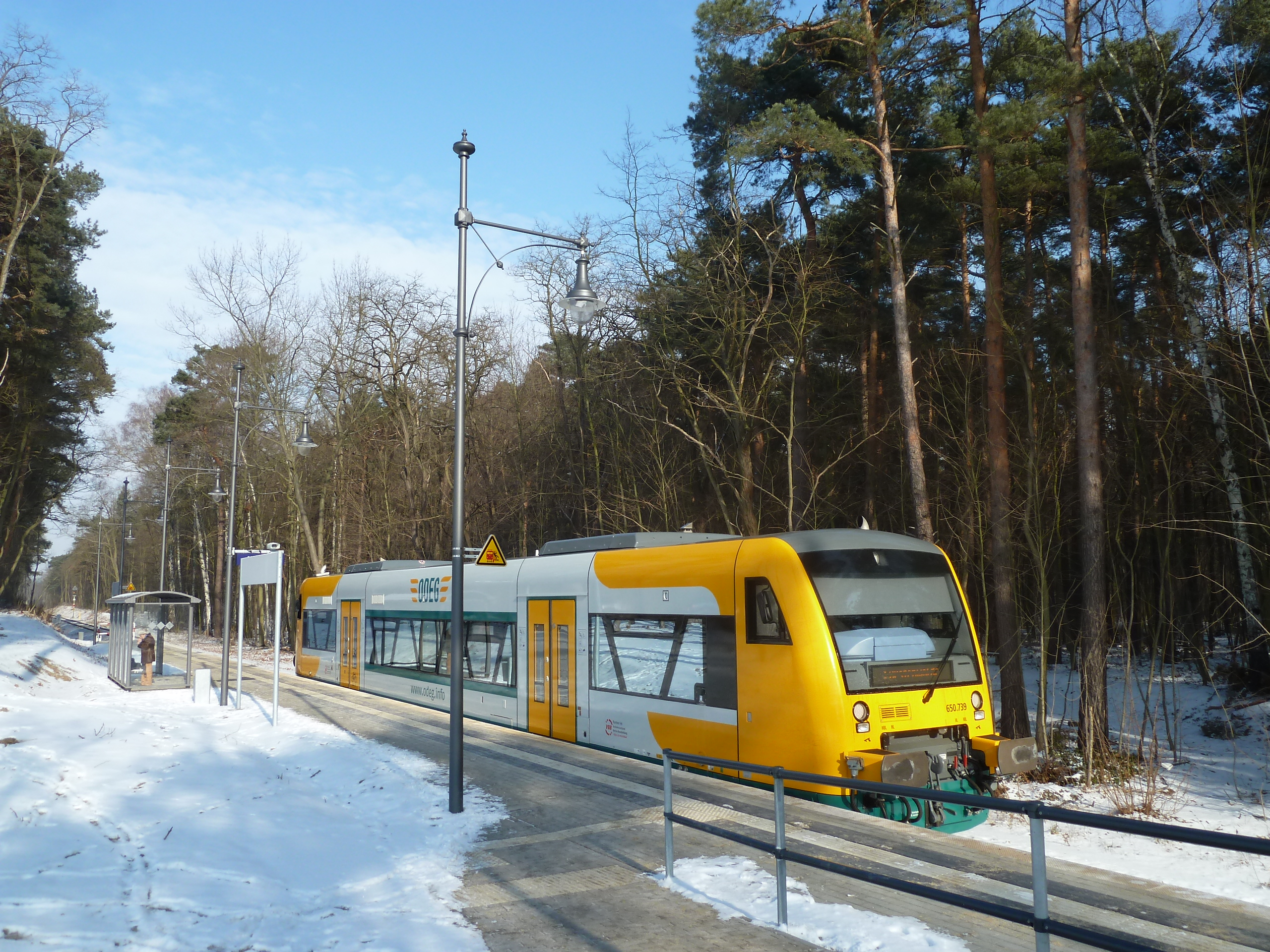

General information
- Location: Pieskower Straße; 15526 Bad Saarow; Brandenburg; Germany
- Coordinates: 52.2848°N 14.0659°E
- Line: Fürstenwalde–Beeskow
- Platforms: 1
- Tracks: 1
- Train operators: Niederbarnimer Eisenbahn

Other information
- Station code: -
- DS100 code: -
- IBNR: 8010028
- Category
- Fare zone: : 6066

History
- Opened: 24 October 2011; 14 years ago

Services
Preceding station	Niederbarnimer Eisenbahn	Following station
Bad Saarow towards Fürstenwalde (Spree)	RB 35	Bad Saarow-Pieskow Terminus
Location
- Location within Brandenburg Location within Germany Location within Europe

Bad Saarow Klinikum station is a railway station in the municipality of Bad Saarow in the district Oder-Spree of Brandenburg. It is served by the line RB 35.

The station, which is situated near the local hospital, was opened on 24 October 2011.
