= Waren (Müritz) station =

Railway station in Germany

Waren (Müritz)
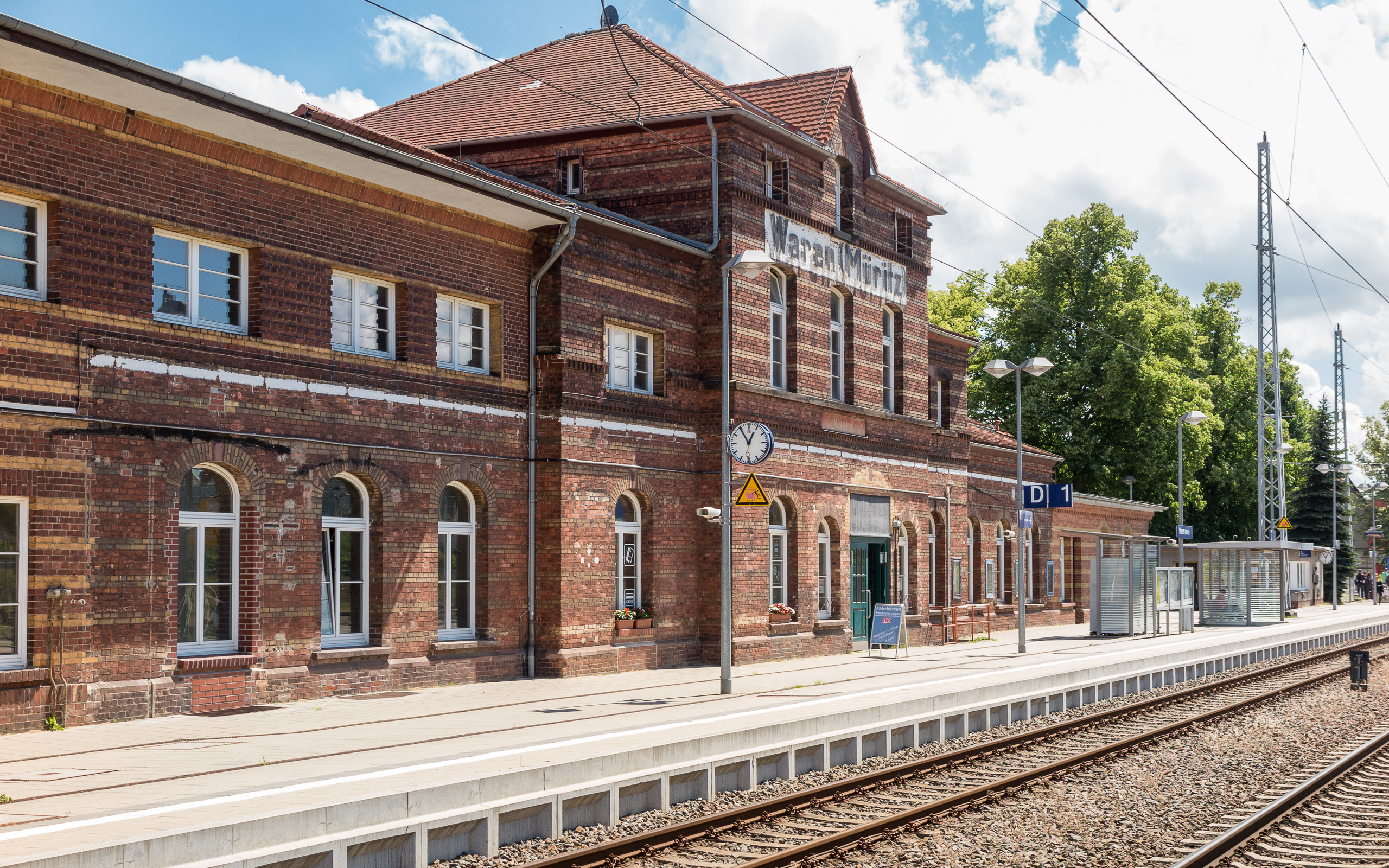
- 2016

General information
- Location: Lloydstraße 3; 17192 Waren (Müritz); Mecklenburg-Vorpommern; Germany
- Coordinates: 53°31′19″N 12°40′50″E
- Owner: Deutsche Bahn
- Operator: DB Netz; DB Station&Service
- Lines: Neustrelitz–Warnemünde railway (KBS 205); Mecklenburg Southern Railway (KBS 172); Waren–Malchin railway (KBS 178)
- Platforms: 1 island platform 1 side platform
- Tracks: 3
- Train operators: DB Fernverkehr; DB Regio Nordost; Ostdeutsche Eisenbahn
- Connections: 8 14 20 22 26 231 403

Other information
- Station code: 6538
- DS100 code: WWR
- IBNR: 8010361
- Category: 3
- Website: www.bahnhof.de

History
- Opened: 9 September 1879; 146 years ago
- Electrified: 14 December 1984; 41 years ago

Services
Preceding station	DB Fernverkehr	Following station
Rostock Hbf towards Berlin Gesundbrunnen	ICE 11	Berlin Gesundbrunnen towards München Hbf
Rostock Hbf Terminus	IC 17	Neustrelitz Hbf towards Dresden Hbf or Chemnitz Hbf
Rostock Hbf Terminus	IC 56	Neustrelitz Hbf towards Magdeburg Hbf
Preceding station	DB Regio Nordost	Following station
Langhagen towards Rostock Hbf	RE 5	Kratzeburg towards Berlin Südkreuz
Langhagen towards Rostock Hbf	RE 50	Kratzeburg towards Neustrelitz Hbf
Preceding station	Ostdeutsche Eisenbahn	Following station
Warenshof towards Plau am See	RB 15	Terminus
Location
- Location within Mecklenburg-Vorpommern Location within Germany Location within Europe

Waren (Müritz) station is a railway station in the municipality of Waren (Müritz), located in the Mecklenburgische Seenplatte district in Mecklenburg-Vorpommern, Germany.

== Services ==
In the 2026 timetable, the following services stop at the station:

Line	Route	Frequency
ICE 11	Warnemünde – Rostock – Waren – Berlin – Leipzig – Erfurt – Frankfurt – Mannheim – Stuttgart – Munich	One train pair
IC 17	Warnemünde – Rostock – Waren – Neustrelitz – Oranienburg – Berlin Gesundbrunnen – Berlin Hbf – Berlin Südkreuz – BER Airport – Elsterwerda – Dresden (– Chemnitz)	120 min
IC 56	Magdeburg – Berlin Hbf – Oranienburg – Waren – Rostock	One train pair
RB 15	Waren – Inselstadt Malchow ( – Plau am See)	120 min
RE 5	Berlin Südkreuz – Berlin – Oranienburg – Neustrelitz – Waren – Güstrow – Rostock	120 min
RE 50	Neustrelitz – Waren – Güstrow – Rostock	120 min
