= Kratzeburg =

- Municipality
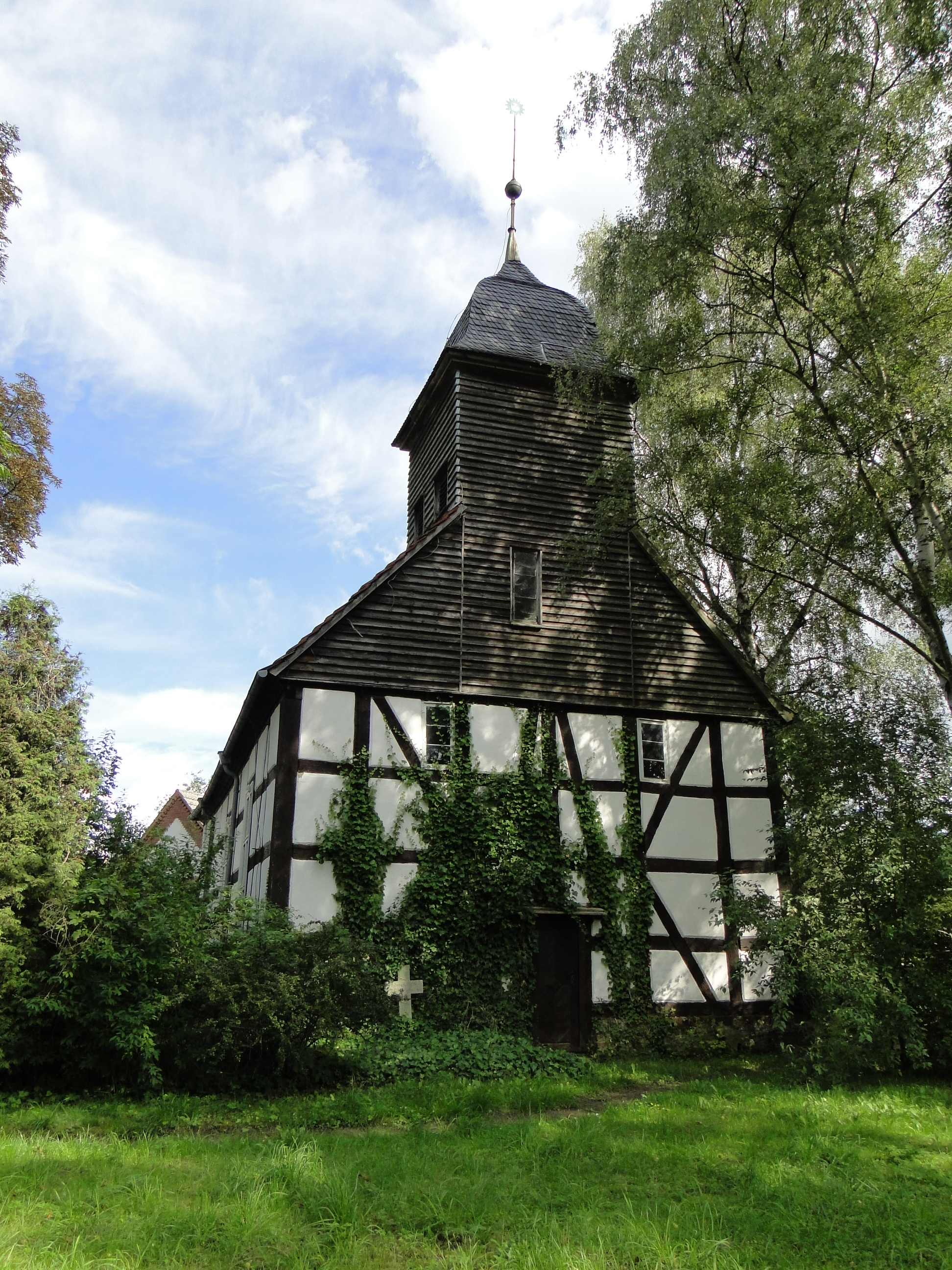
- Kratzeburg church

- Location of Kratzeburg within Mecklenburgische Seenplatte district
- Interactive map of Kratzeburg
- Location within Germany Location within Mecklenburg-Vorpommern
- Coordinates: 53°26′N 12°56′E
- Country: Germany
- State: Mecklenburg-Vorpommern
- District: Mecklenburgische Seenplatte
- Municipal assoc.: Neustrelitz-Land

Government
  - Mayor: Guntram Wagner

Area
  - Total: 54.66 km^{2} (21.10 sq mi)
- Elevation: 68 m (223 ft)

Population (2025-12-31)
  - Total: 538
  - Density: 9.84/km^{2} (25.5/sq mi)
- Time zone: UTC+01:00 (CET)
  - Summer (DST): UTC+02:00 (CEST)
- Postal codes: 17237
- Dialling codes: 039822
- Vehicle registration: MST
- Website: www.amtneustrelitz-land.de

Kratzeburg is a municipality in the district Mecklenburgische Seenplatte, in Mecklenburg-Vorpommern, Germany.
