= Barth station =

German railway station

Barth
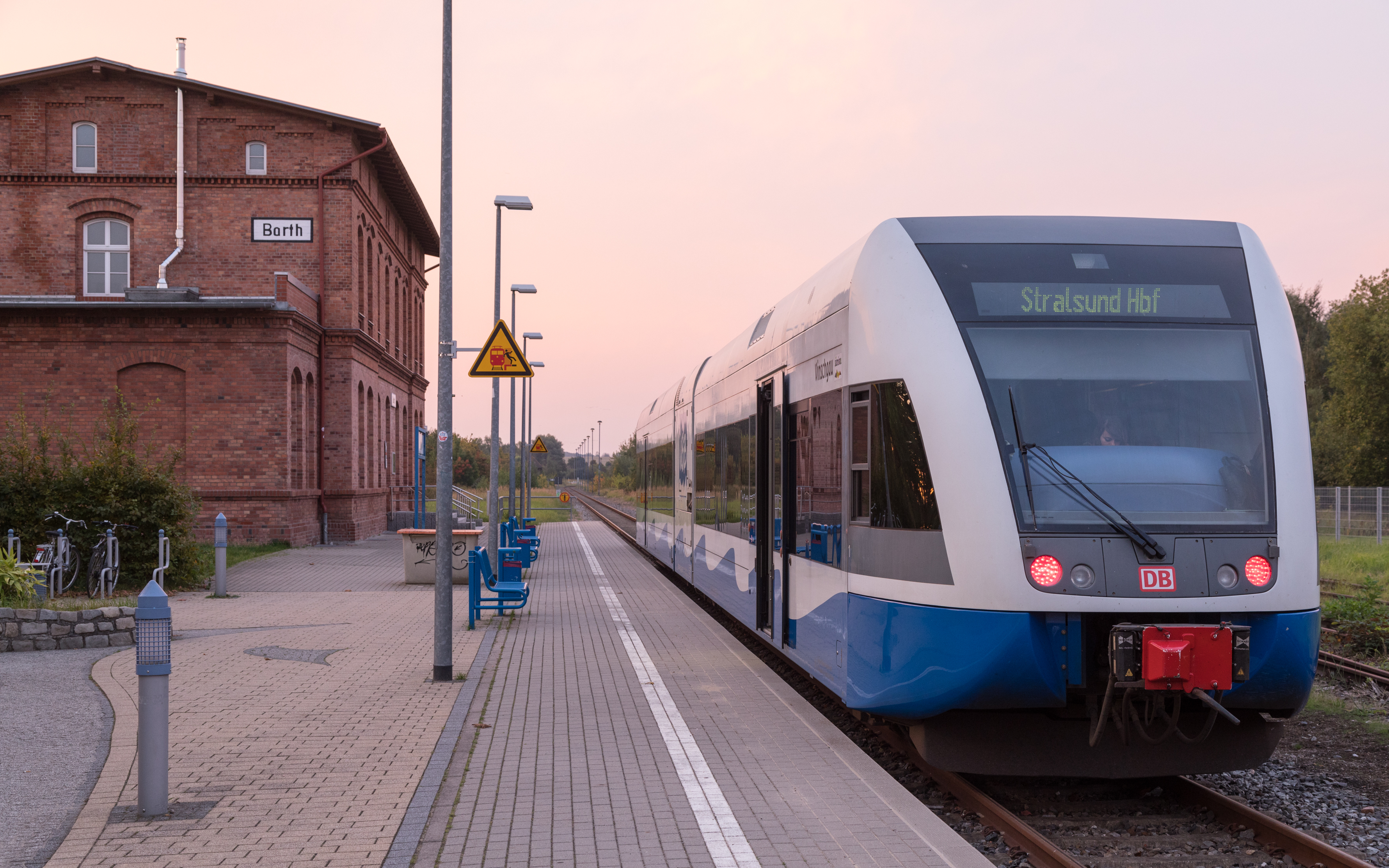
- Barth station

General information
- Location: Barth, MV, Germany
- Coordinates: 54°21′43″N 12°43′34″E
- Line: Velgast-Barth railway
- Platforms: 1
- Tracks: 1
- Train operators: DB Regio Nordost
- Connections: RB 25

History
- Opened: 1 July 1888; 138 years ago
- Electrified: 2 June 1991; 35 years ago till 2005

Services
Preceding station	DB Regio Nordost	Following station
Kenz towards Velgast	RB 25	Terminus
Location
- Location within Mecklenburg-Vorpommern Location within Germany Location within Europe

Barth (German: Bahnhof Barth) is a railway station in the town of Barth, Mecklenburg-Vorpommern, Germany. The station lies on the Velgast-Barth railway and the train services are operated by Deutsche Bahn.

== Train services ==
The station is served by the following service:

- Local services RB 25 Barth - Velgast
