= Parchim station =

Railway station in Germany

Parchim
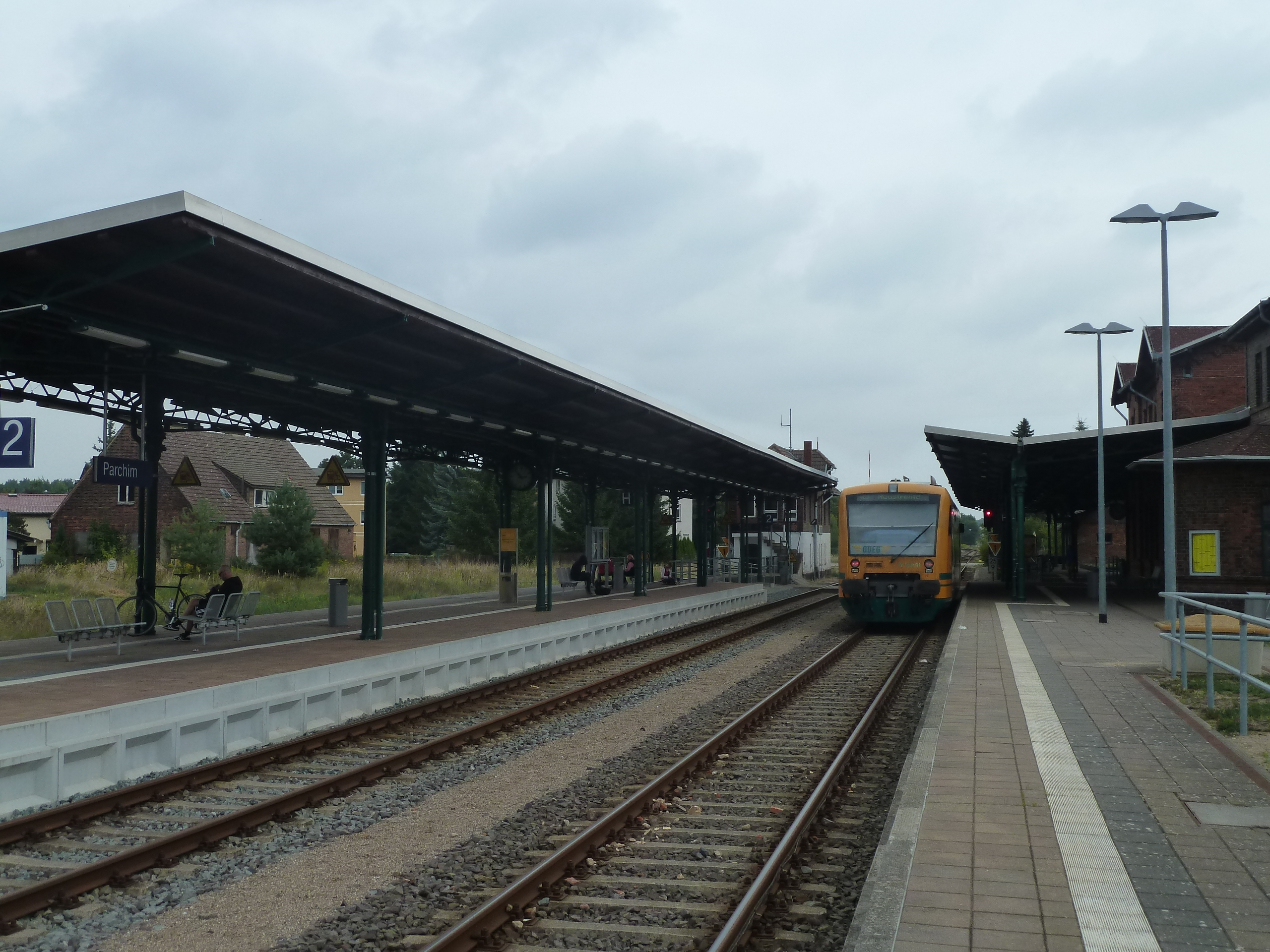
- 2013

General information
- Location: Am Bahnhof 1; 19370 Parchim; Mecklenburg-Vorpommern; Germany
- Coordinates: 53.4301°N 11.8312°E
- Owner: Deutsche Bahn
- Operator: DB Netz; DB Station&Service
- Lines: Parchim-Ludwigslust Railway (KBS 172); Mecklenburg Southern Railway (KBS 172); Schwerin–Parchim railway (KBS 152)
- Platforms: 1 island platform 1 side platform
- Tracks: 3
- Train operators: ODEG

Construction
- Parking: yes
- Cycle facilities: yes
- Accessible: yes

Other information
- Station code: 4864
- DS100 code: WPM
- IBNR: 8010267
- Category: 6
- Website: www.bahnhof.de

History
- Opened: 15 June 1880; 146 years ago

Services
Preceding station	Ostdeutsche Eisenbahn	Following station
Domsühl towards Rehna	RB 13	Terminus
Spornitz towards Hagenow Stadt	RB 14	Terminus
Terminus	RB 19 Seasonal service	Lübz towards Plau am See
Location
- Location within Mecklenburg-Vorpommern Location within Germany Location within Europe

Parchim station (German: Bahnhof Parchim) is a railway station in the municipality of Parchim, located in the Ludwigslust-Parchim district in Mecklenburg-Vorpommern, Germany.

== Notable places nearby ==
- Parchim International Airport
