= Ostdeutsche Eisenbahn =

German transport company

- Industry: Transport
- Founded: June 2002; 24 years ago
- Headquarters: Parchim, Germany
- Owner: Prignitzer Eisenbahn (50%); BeNEX (50%)
- Number of employees: 480
- Website: www.odeg.de

Ostdeutsche Eisenbahn GmbH (ODEG; literally 'East German Railway') is a joint venture, founded in June 2002, of the Prignitzer Eisenbahn (part of the Netinera Group) and BeNEX, with each company owning 50% of the joint venture. It operates passenger services on eleven railway lines in Berlin, Brandenburg, Mecklenburg-Vorpommern, Saxony and Saxony-Anhalt in eastern Germany.

== Rolling stock ==
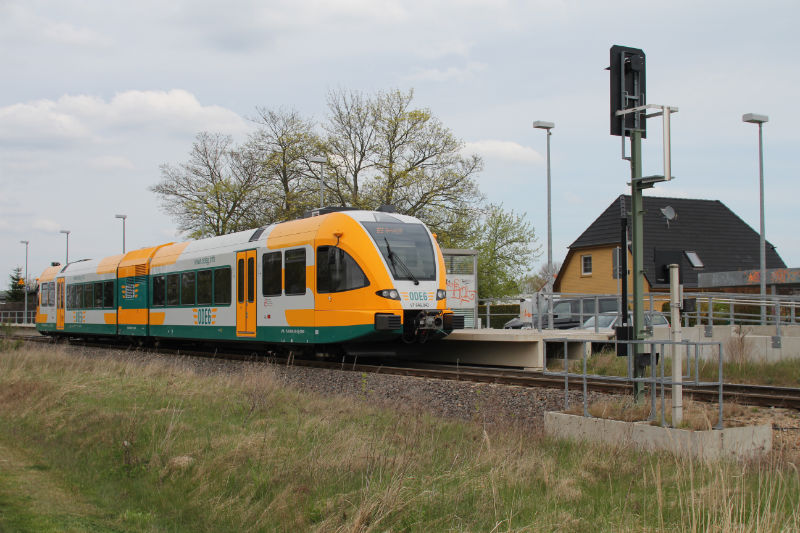
Stadler GTW on the line RB51 in Brandenburg

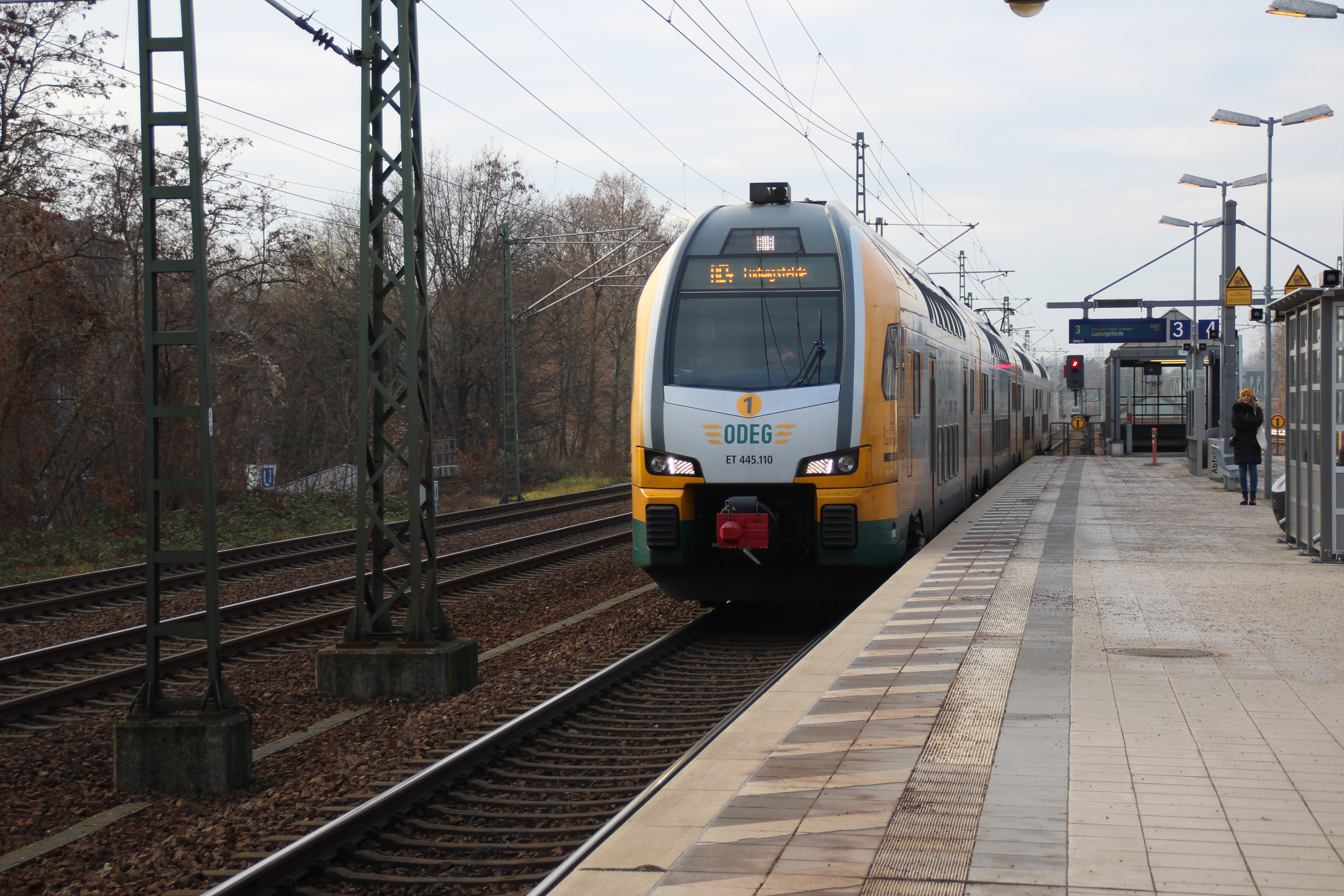
Stadler KISS on the line RE4 in Berlin

Video of a Stadler KISS at Berlin Westhafen

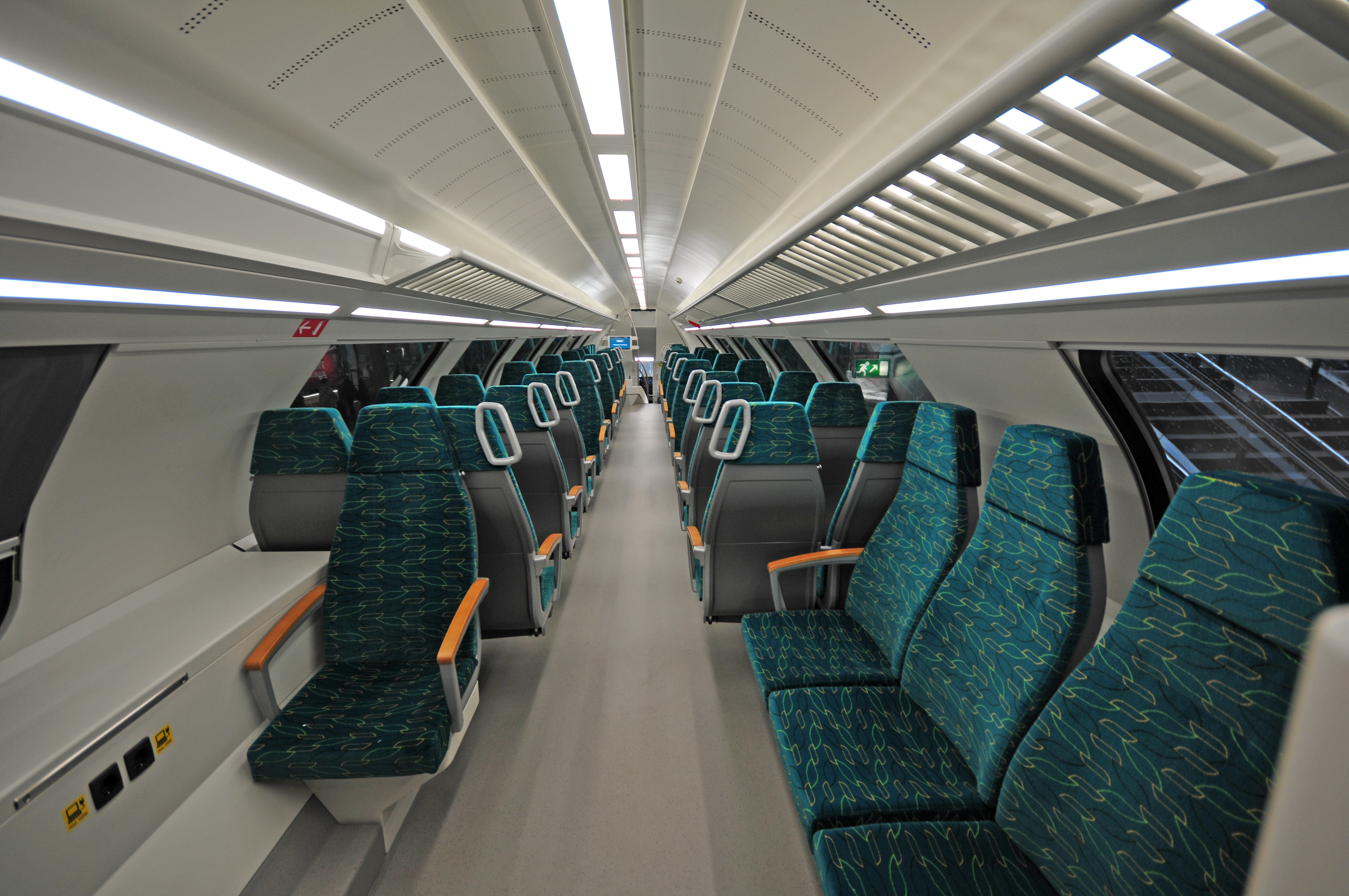
Second class interior of a Stadler KISS

- 14× Stadler Regio-Shuttle RS1
- 6× Siemens Desiro Classic
- 6× Stadler GTW
- 16× Stadler KISS
- 1× Stadler Flirt
- 7× Siemens Desiro ML

== Network ==
=== Current services ===
Line	KBS	Route	Duration of contract
RE 1	201	Magdeburg – Brandenburg – Potsdam – Berlin – Frankfurt (Oder) – Eisenhüttenstadt – Cottbus Brandenburg – Potsdam – Berlin – Frankfurt (Oder)	December 2022 – December 2034
RE 8	208	Wismar – Schwerin – Wittenberge – Nauen – Berlin – BER Airport	December 2022 – December 2025
RE 8		Berlin – Baruth – Elsterwerda / – Finsterwalde	December 2022 – December 2025
RE 9	190	Rostock – Ribnitz-Damgarten – Velgast – Stralsund – Bergen – Lietzow – Sassnitz / – Ostseebad Binz	December 2019 – December 2034
RE 10	190, 203	(Rostock – Ribnitz-Damgarten – Velgast –) Stralsund – Greifswald – Züssow	December 2019 – December 2034
RB 13	152	Rehna – Schwerin Hauptbahnhof – Parchim	December 2013 – December 2019
RB 14	172	Hagenow Stadt – Hagenow Land – Ludwigslust – Parchim	December 2002 – December 2019
RB 15		Waren (Müritz) – Inselstadt Malchow (– Karow (Meckl) – Plau am See)	December 2019 – December 2025
RB 16		Neustrelitz – Mirow (HANS operates on behalf of ODEG)	December 2021 – December 2025
RB 19	174	Parchim – Lübz – Karow (Meckl) – Plau am See (seasonal traffic)	May 2020 – August 2025
RB 33	209.33	Potsdam – Caputh-Geltow – Beelitz Stadt – Treuenbrietzen – Jüterbog	December 2011 – December 2022
RB 37		Berlin-Wannsee – Michendorf – Beelitz Stadt	December 2022 – December 2034
RB 46	209.46	Cottbus – Forst (Lausitz)	December 2008 – December 2030
RB 51	209.51	Rathenow – Pritzerbe – Brandenburg Hauptbahnhof	December 2011 – December 2022
RB 64	229	Görlitz – Niesky – Hoyerswerda	December 2008 – December 2030
RB 65	220	Cottbus – Görlitz – Zittau	December 2008 – December 2030

=== Former services ===
Line	KBS	Route	Duration of contract	Notes
RE 2	202	Wismar – Schwerin Hauptbahnhof – Wittenberge – Berlin Hauptbahnhof – Cottbus	December 2012 – December 2022	change of operator to DB Regio Nordost
RE 4	204	Stendal – Rathenow – Berlin Südkreuz – Ludwigsfelde – Jüterbog	December 2012 – December 2022	change of operator to DB Regio Nordost
R 3	172	Parchim – Karow (Meckl) – Inselstadt Malchow	December 2002 – December 2014	change of operator to Eisenbahngesellschaft Potsdam
R 3	172	Inselstadt Malchow – Waren (Müritz)	December 2002 – December 2014	change of operator to DB Regio Nordost
R 3	205	Waren (Müritz) – Neustrelitz Hauptbahnhof	December 2002 – December 2014	closure of railway
R 6	173	Neustrelitz Hauptbahnhof – Mirow	December 2002 – December 2012	change of operator to Eisenbahngesellschaft Potsdam
RB 25	209.25	Berlin-Lichtenberg – Ahrensfelde – Werneuchen	December 2004 – December 2014	change of operator to Niederbarnimer Eisenbahn
RB 25	209.25	Werneuchen – Tiefensee	December 2004 – December 2006	closure of railway
RB 34	304	Stendal – Schönhausen (Elbe) – Rathenow	December 2015 – December 2018	change of operator to Hanseatische Eisenbahn
RB 35	209.35	Fürstenwalde (Spree) – Bad Saarow Klinikum	December 2007 – December 2014	change of operator to Niederbarnimer Eisenbahn
RB 36	209.36	Berlin-Lichtenberg – Beeskow – Frankfurt (Oder)	December 2004 – December 2014	change of operator to Niederbarnimer Eisenbahn
RB 41		Lübben – Lübbenau – Cottbus	December 2018 – December 2020	Closed by state of Brandenburg, replaced by buses
RB 60	209.60	Berlin-Lichtenberg – Eberswalde Hauptbahnhof – Frankfurt (Oder)	December 2004 – December 2014	change of operator to DB Regio Nordost (Berlin-Lichtenberg – Eberswalde) and NEB (Eberswalde – Frankfurt (Oder)
RB 63	209.60	Eberswalde Hauptbahnhof – Joachimsthal	December 2004 – December 2014	change of operator to Niederbarnimer Eisenbahn
OE 60V	230	Görlitz – Bautzen – Bischofswerda	December 2008 – December 2018	change of operator to Trilex
RB 63	209.60	Joachimsthal – Templin	December 2004 – December 2006	closure of railway
RB 63V	203	Eberswalde Hauptbahnhof – Prenzlau	January 2011 – December 2014	change of operator to Niederbarnimer Eisenbahn

=== Network map ===
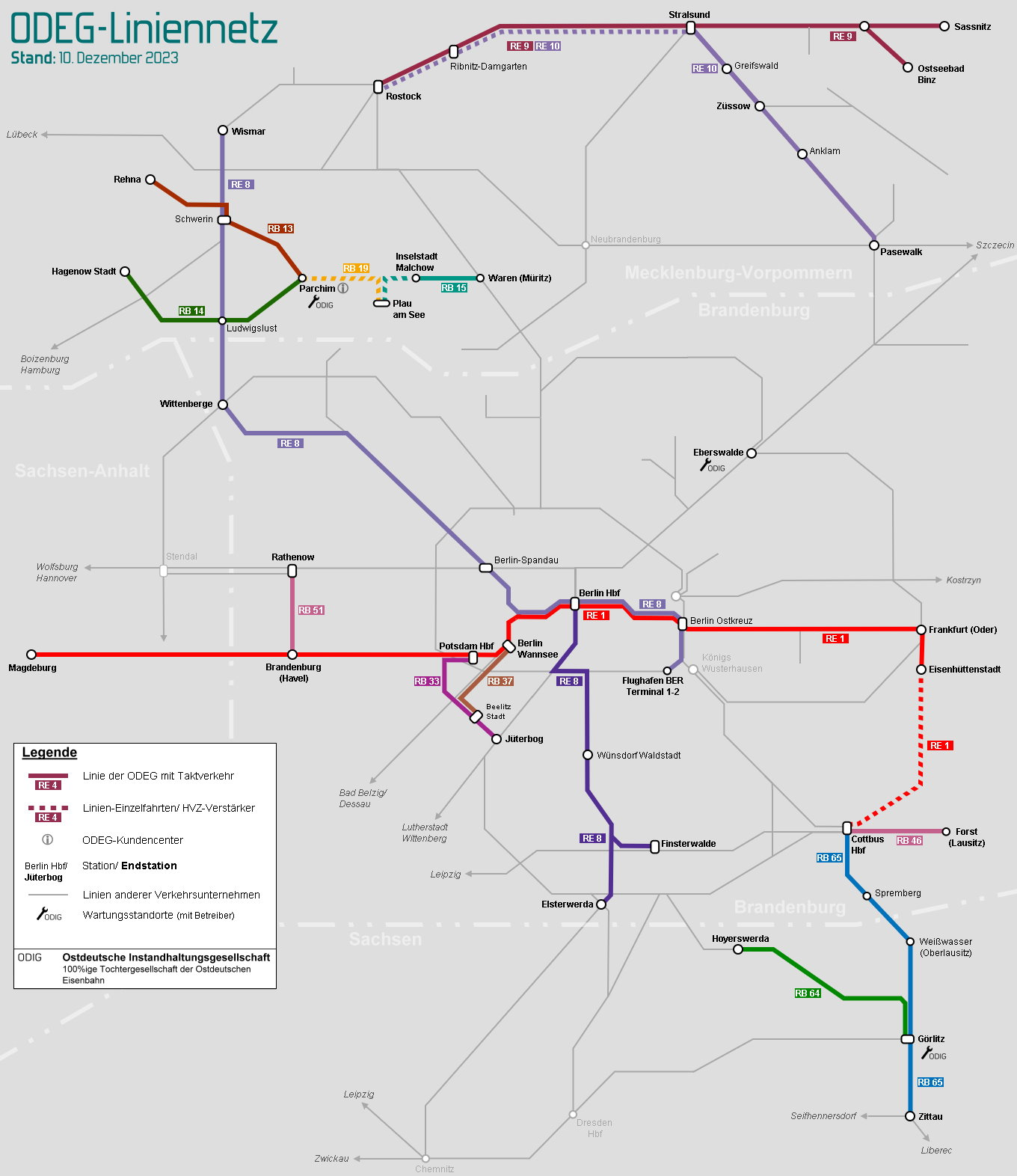
ODEG Network map 2024

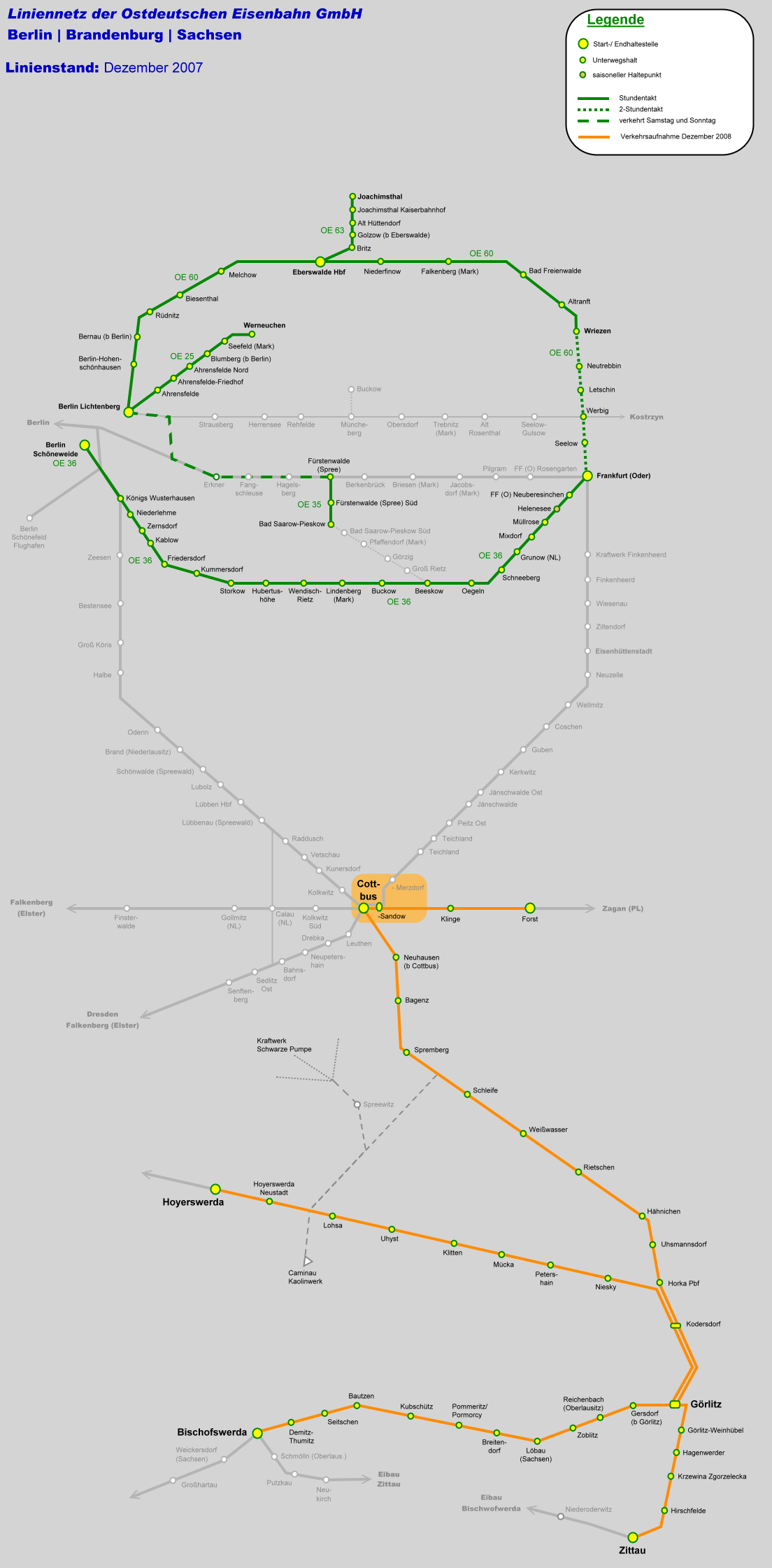
December 2007

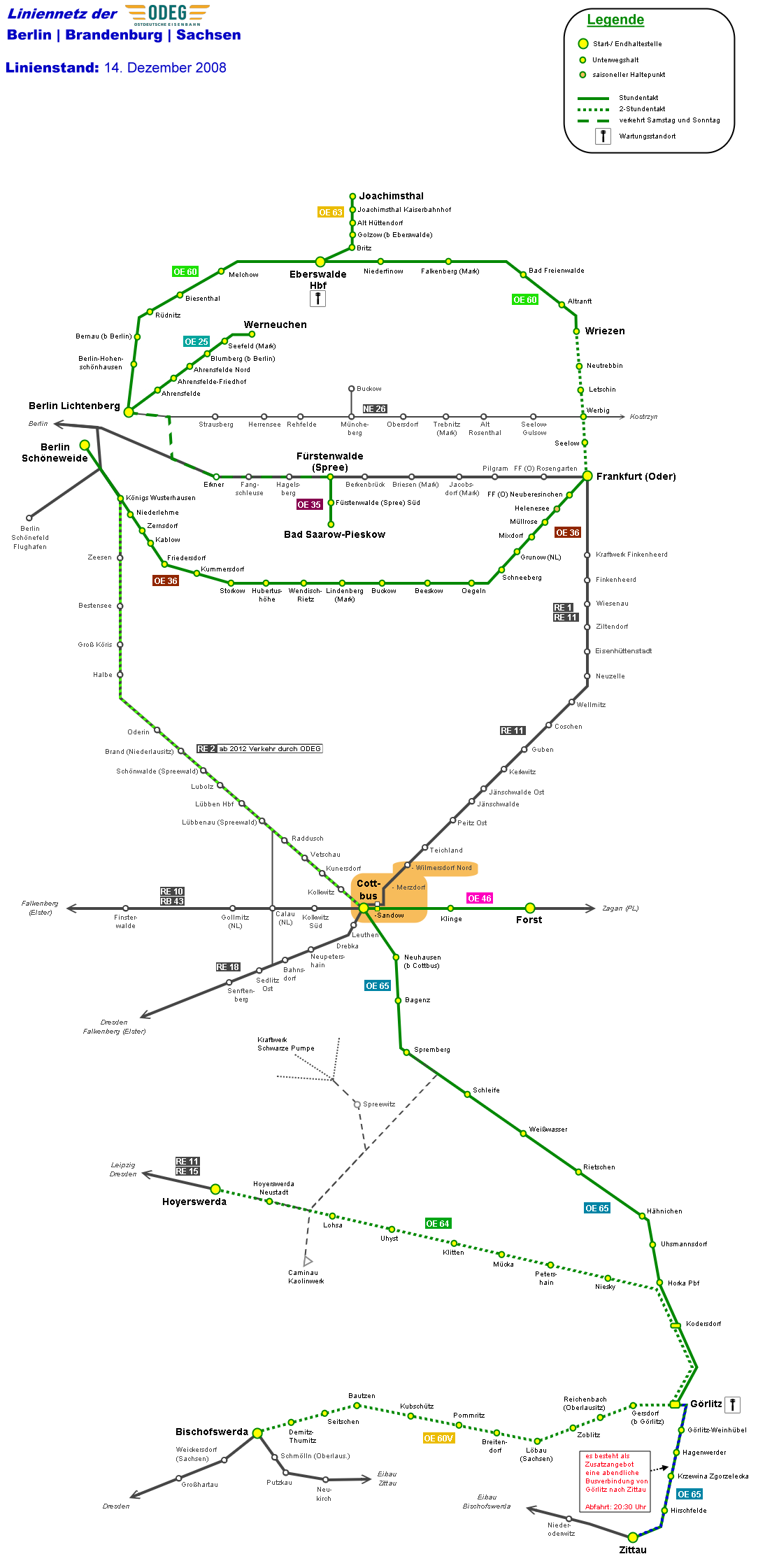
December 2008

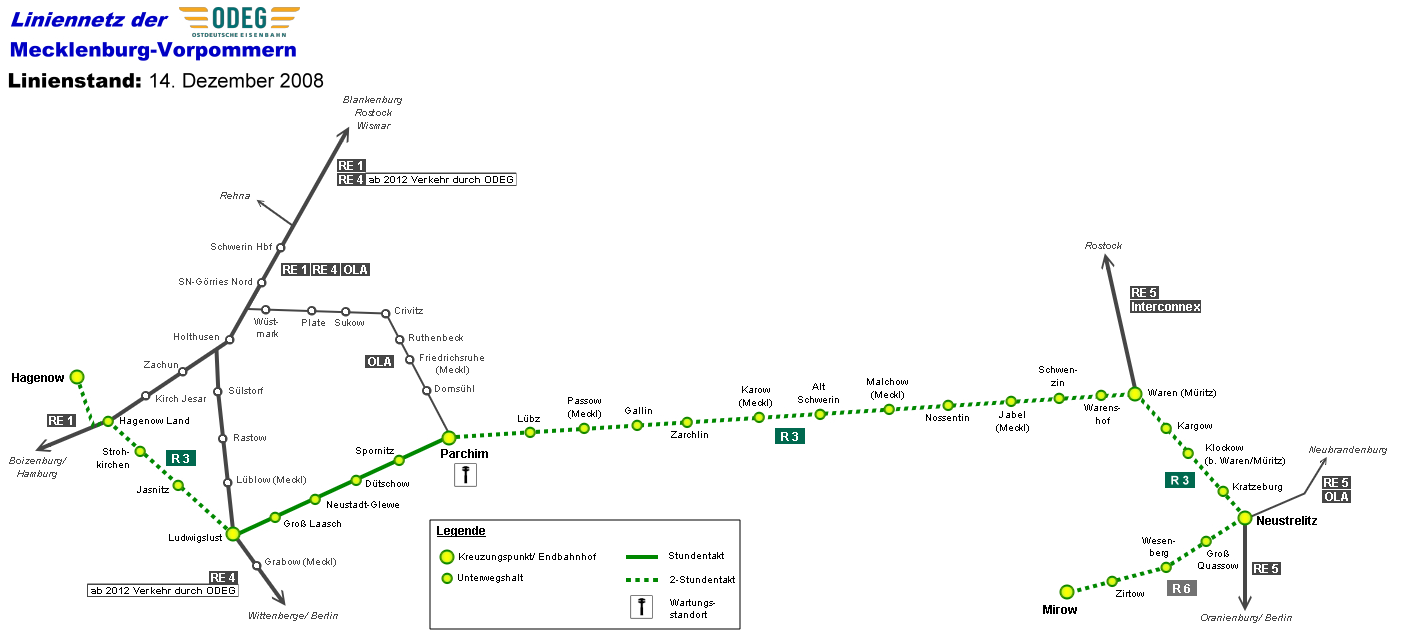
December 2008 (Mecklenburg-Vorpommern)

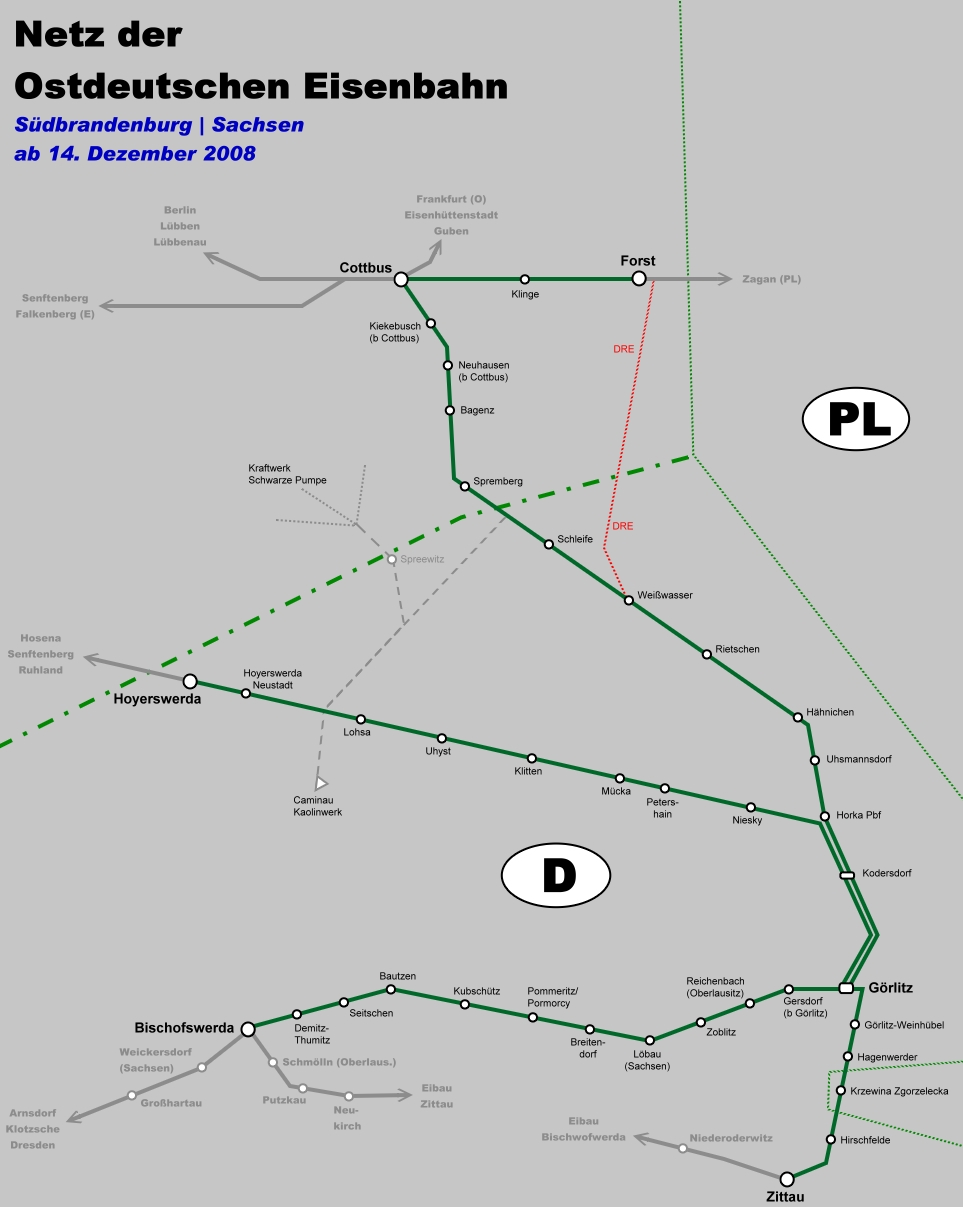
December 2008 (Saxony)

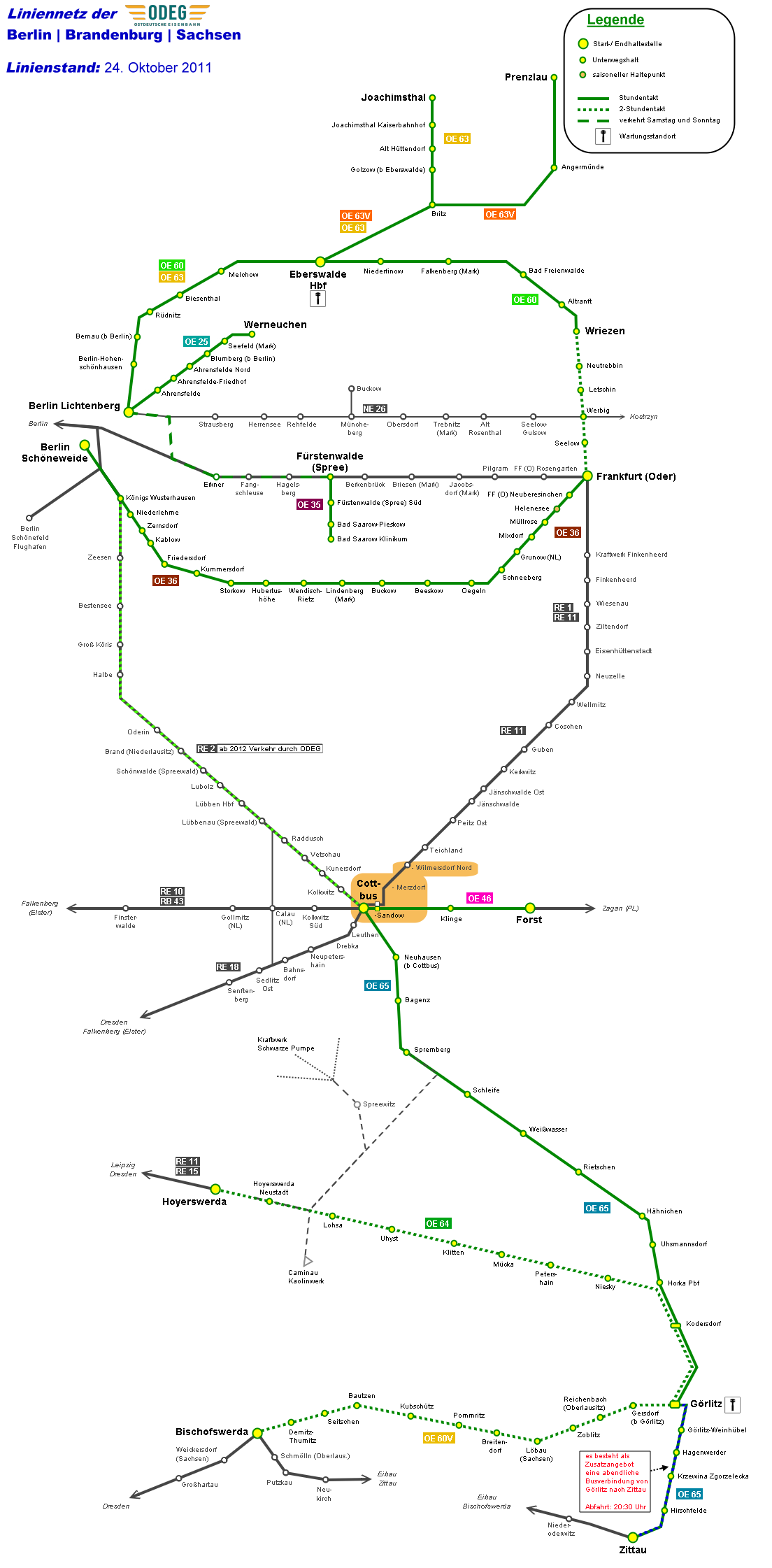
December 2011
