= Fürstenwalde (Spree) station =

Train station in Brandenburg, Germany

Fürstenwalde (Spree)
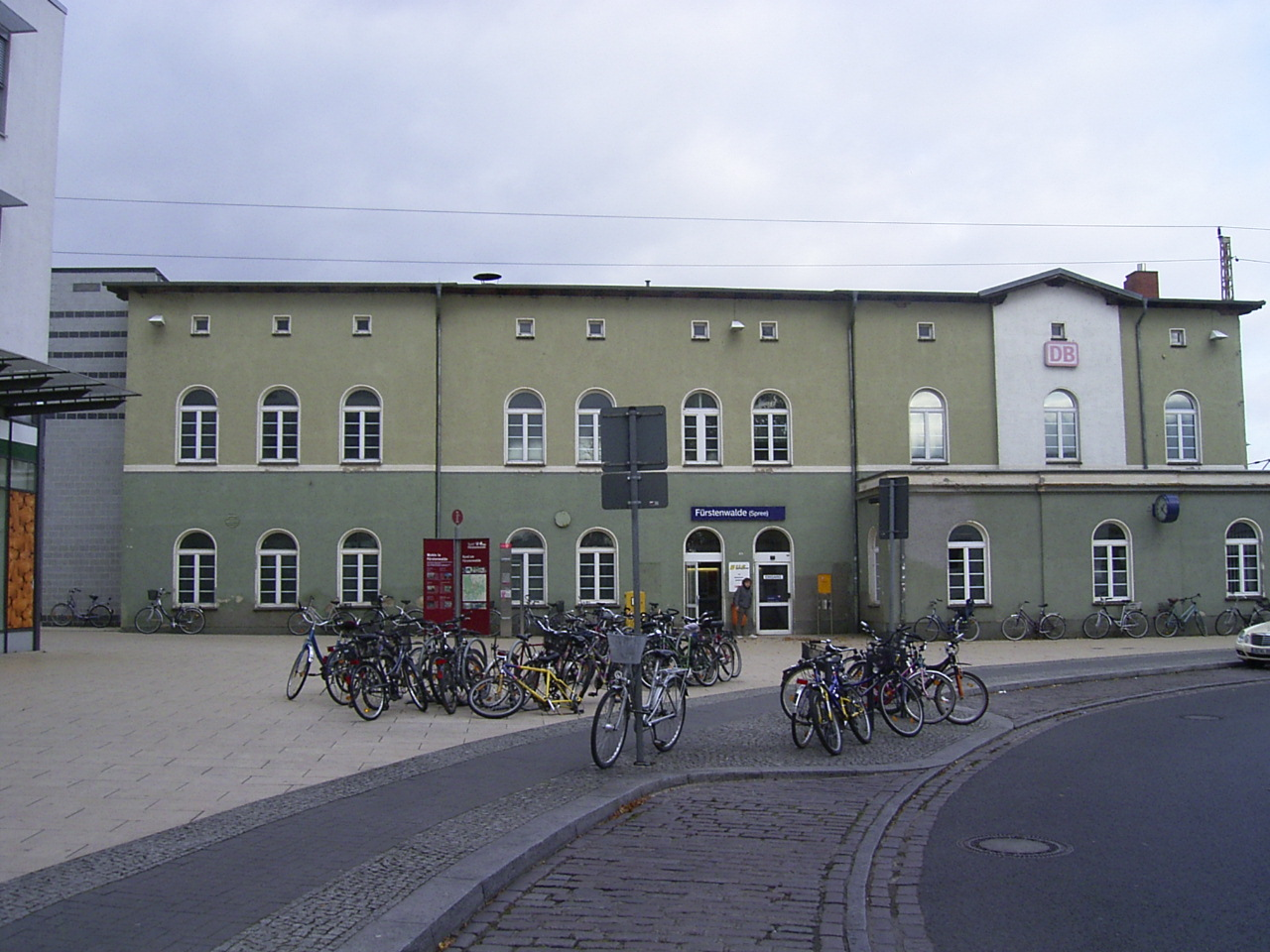
- Station forecourt

General information
- Location: Am Bahnhof 1, Fürstenwalde/Spree, Brandenburg; Germany
- Coordinates: 52°22′0″N 14°3′35″E
- Owner: DB Netz
- Operator: DB Station&Service
- Lines: Berlin–Guben; Fürstenwalde–Beeskow (now only to Bad Saarow Klinikum); Fürstenwalde–Wriezen (closed); Erkner-Fürstenwalde S-Bahn (until 1994)
- Platforms: 4 (3 in operation)

Construction
- Accessible: Yes

Other information
- Station code: 1980
- DS100 code: BFUW
- IBNR: 8010120
- Category: 4
- Fare zone: VBB: 5866
- Website: www.bahnhof.de

History
- Opened: 23 October 1842; 183 years ago

Services
Preceding station	Ostdeutsche Eisenbahn	Following station
Hangelsberg towards Brandenburg Hbf	RE 1	Frankfurt (Oder) Terminus
Fangschleuse towards Magdeburg Hbf	RE 1	Berkenbrück towards Cottbus Hbf
Preceding station	Niederbarnimer Eisenbahn	Following station
Terminus	RB 35	Fürstenwalde (Spree) Süd towards Bad Saarow-Pieskow
Location

Fürstenwalde (Spree) station is the station of the city of Fürstenwalde/Spree in the German state of Brandenburg. It was opened on 23 October 1842 on the Berlin-Frankfurt railway. The station was then about one kilometre north of the town on Müncheberger Chaussee. The station building still exists and is one of the oldest in Germany.

== History ==
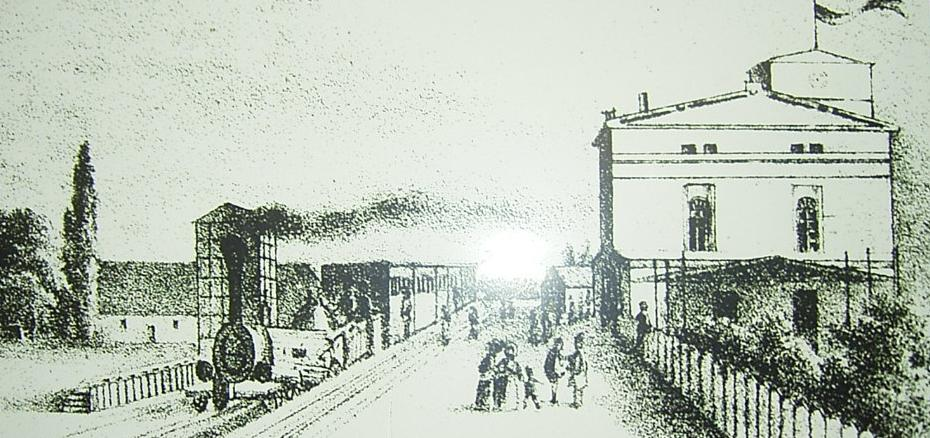
The station about 1845

The Berlin-Frankfurt Railway was opened for passenger services on 23 October 1842. Freight operations commenced on October 31 of that year. As of August 1845, the line was extended as part by the Lower Silesian-Markish Railway (Niederschlesisch-Märkische Eisenbahn-Gesellschaft) to Wrocław (then Breslau), completed in 1846.

The station was established west of the Müncheberger Chaussee, which as a result was renamed Eisenbahnstraße (“railway street”) between the town and the station. It was about one kilometre north of the city. A major reason for the establishment of the station would have been the Fürstenwalder Spreemuhle opened in 1837. This water mill of American design required a large amount of grain, which would be transported by rail.

=== Station upgrade ===
The rail link subsequently proved to be a stimulus for growth. Goods were transported from Berlin and commodities, especially Silesian coal, were also brought in. By 1860 the Berlin–Breslau railway was double track throughout. The Berlin industrialist Julius Pintsch opened a new branch factory in Fürstenwalde in 1872. This was north of the station.

The railway facilities were extended and sidings were built to many undertakings. The Pintsch company paid for a pedestrian tunnel near the level crossing to reduce delays imposed on its workers by the crossing barriers, which were often closed.

Besides the freight traffic, there was also heavy commuter traffic to and from Berlin. On 1 October 1891, a much reduced suburban fare was introduced to Berlin. A major reason was the large military establishment in the town. The long-distance and suburban services were separated in 1882. Suburban tickets could not be used on the long-distance trains to Berlin. The station consisted of the main platform (platform 1) and an island platform (platform 2) which could only be reached by a pedestrian level crossing from platform 1. Therefore, trains could not operate past platform 1 when passengers were crossing to or from platform 2. At the beginning of the 20th century, the main platform was roofed next to the entrance building.

After the Second World War, the southern track was temporarily converted to Soviet broad-gauge in 1945/46.

The timetable of Deutsche Reichsbahn included shuttle trains running between Fürstenwalde and Erkner. These were regarded as S-Bahn services and could be used with S-Bahn tickets. There were also passenger trains to Frankfurt (Oder) and passenger trains between Berlin Ostbahnhof and Eisenhüttenstadt. The latter trains stopped only in Fürstenwalde and Frankfurt.

The electrification of the line began at the end of the 1980s. Electrical operations towards Berlin commenced in September 1989 and was extended to Frankfurt in December 1990. Fürstenwalde was not part of the S-Bahn from 1994. With the founding of the Verkehrsverbund Berlin-Brandenburg (transport association), the area was divided into a honeycomb structure of fare zones in 1999. Fürstenwalde was initially assigned to the Berlin C fare zone, but was dropped from this in 2002. As a result, after more than 110 years, the reduced suburban fare was abandoned.

=== Light railways ===
The Prussian Light Railway Act of 1892 stimulated the planning of light railways in the region. There were plans to develop the Oderbruch with a railway and to build a line to Beeskow. Both lines were opened on 3 June 1911: the Oderbruch Railway to Wriezen via the former Lebus county town of Seelow and the Fürstenwalde–Beeskow District Railway via Bad Saarow. A station for the light railways (Kleinbahnhof) was built to the east of the Müncheberger Chaussee/Eisenbahnstraße level crossing. To distinguish between the stations, the "old" station was referred to as the Staatsbahnhof (state station).

The main traffic of the Oderbruch Railway was transporting crops from the Oder region to Berlin or the transport of workers for the harvest. With the advent of road transport in the 1950s and 60s, the railway became obsolete. Operations to Fürstenwalde were closed on 28 September 1968.

The Fürstenwalde–Beeskow District Railway connected to the main line at Beeskow and had a branch to the resorts in the Scharmützelsee (Scharmützel lake) area. As the line needed to be completely rebuilt in 1997, it was closed. But only the Fürstenwalde–Bad Saarow section was re-opened in 1999. In 2011, the line was extended to the new station of Bad Saarow Klinikum. It is unlikely that the other sections will be reopened. The closed part has been replaced by bus route 403 from Fürstenwalde to Beeskow.

=== Remodelling of the station ===
The station was extensively rebuilt with upgrade of the Berlin–Frankfurt (Oder) line for 160 km/h operations. First, a new platform (originally platform 51, now platform 4) was built west of platform 1 in 1999, so that platform 1 could be demolished.

In addition to the rebuilding of platform 1, the station forecourt has been completely redesigned. The bus station was built opposite the new 210 metre-long platform. The city buses stop on the other side of the platform from the trains. Covered bicycle parking and a taxi stand were also built. A planned new station building between the historic station building and a newly built office tower was not realised for cost reasons.

Then a new 210 metre-long island platform was built between the newly built through tracks 2 and 3. It is connected by a pedestrian bridge with platform 1 and the town centre to the south and to the northern station forecourt, which has additional bus stops and car and bicycle parking. All platforms are accessible by lifts. Platform 4 was closed for passengers operations with the opening of the island platform. Its track is sometimes used for the parking of goods trains.

The level crossing at the station was removed and a new tunnel was built for pedestrians and cyclists, although it has no direct connection to the station.

The station building was no longer necessary for rail operations and was sold as part of a large package of 1,004 stations. The buyer renovated the lobby in 2010 and built a small annex for the remaining station services. These include a bicycle hire service. In the main hall there is a ticket office staffed by the Busverkehr Oder-Spree bus company and a kiosk and snack bar. Another snack bar can be reached from the outside. The investor who acquired the station as a pilot project is now seeking (August 2014) to sell it.

== Other stations in Fürstenwalde ==
There used to be more stations on various lines in the urban area of Fürstenwalde, but only the station of Fürstenwalde (Spree) Süd (south), formerly Ketschendorf (Spree), on the Fürstenwalde–Beeskow District Railway is still in operation. Waldfrieden station was on the Oderbruch Railway, near the Waldfrieden institution for recovering alcoholics on Steinhöfeler Chaussee and there was a station on the Fürstenwalde–Beeskow District Railway near the settlement of Buschgarten.

== Rail services ==
Fürstenwalde station was classified by Deutsche Bahn until 2010 as a category 3 station. Since the restructuring of the system and the increase from six to seven levels, it is now classified as category 4. Fürstenwalde (Spree) Süd is classified as category 7 (previously 6).

=== Passenger services ===
The most important service at Fürstenwalde (Spree) station is Regional-Express service RE 1, which runs twice an hour in the peak hour. It is operated by Deutsche Bahn. The RE 1 service connects Magdeburg, Brandenburg, Potsdam, Berlin, Fürstenwalde/Spree and Frankfurt (Oder) and is operated approximately every half-hour between Brandenburg and Frankfurt. During peak hours, trains continue to Eisenhüttenstadt and individual services continue via Guben to Cottbus, where the rollingstock are stationed.

It is also served hourly by Regionalbahn line RB 35 operated by Niederbarnimer Eisenbahn from platform 3 to Bad Saarow Klinikum.

The station is served by the following service(s):

Line	Route	Frequency (min)
RE 1	(Magdeburg – Genthin –) Brandenburg – Potsdam – Berlin Stadtbahn – Erkner – Fürstenwalde (Spree) – Briesen – Frankfurt (Oder) (– Eisenhüttenstadt) (– Guben – Cottbus)	60: Magdeburg–Eisenhüttenstadt; 30: Brandenburg–Frankfurt
RB 35	Fürstenwalde (Spree) – Fürstenwalde (Spree) Süd – Bad Saarow – Bad Saarow Klinikum	60

The regular interval times of the trains are matched by the local and regional bus services.

=== Freight ===
Fürstenwalde (Spree) station has very extensive freight facilities. In addition to shunting sidings, there are also five loading tracks just north of the passenger station. These were renewed in 2010 and are used for road-rail loading operations.
