= Rehna station =

Railway station in Rehna, Germany

Rehna
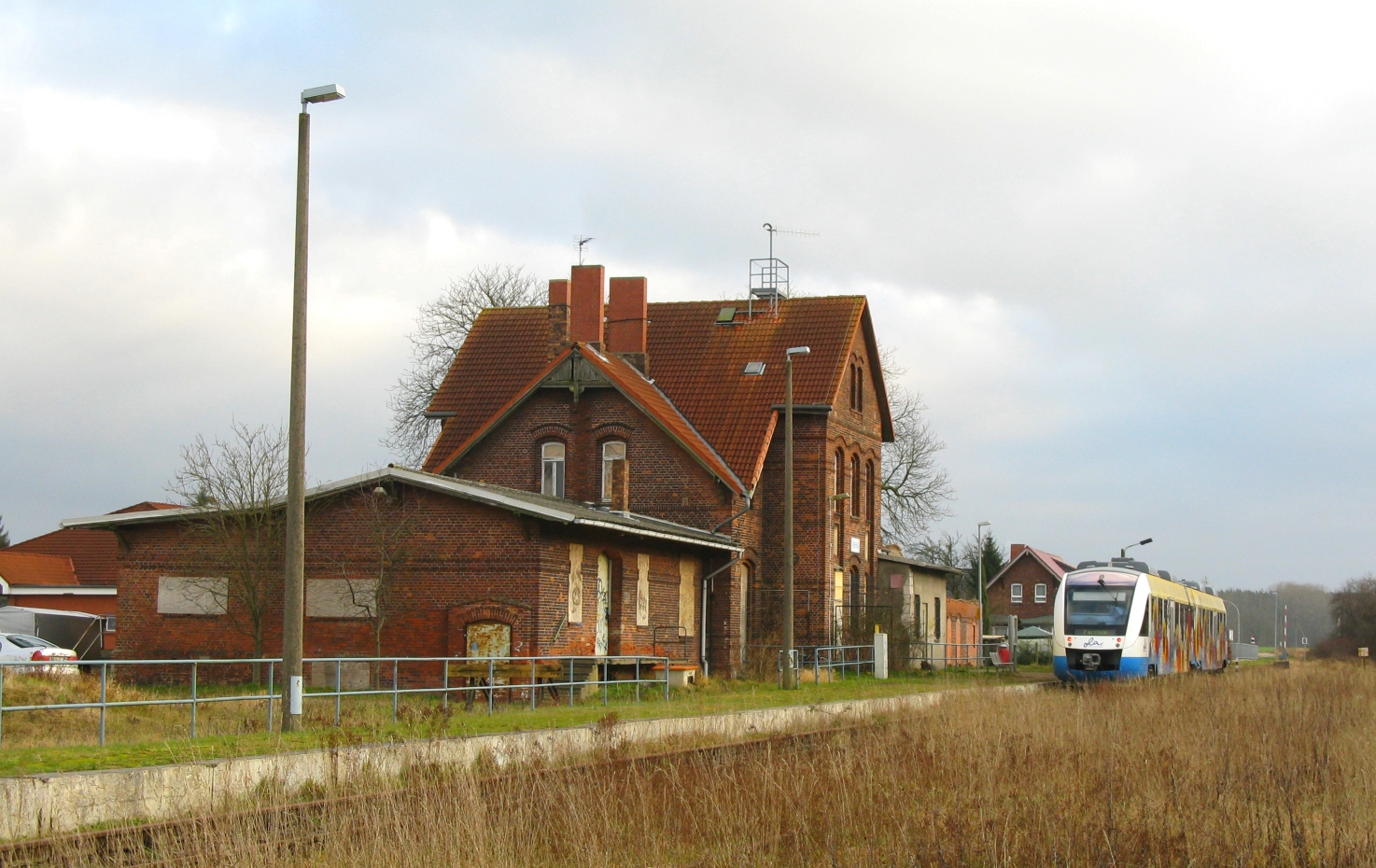
- 2008

General information
- Location: Bahnhofstraße 1; 19217 Rehna; Mecklenburg-Vorpommern; Germany
- Coordinates: 53.7743°N 11.0498°E
- System: Hp
- Owner: Deutsche Bahn
- Operator: DB Station&Service
- Lines: Schwerin–Rehna railway (KBS 152)
- Platforms: 1 side platform
- Tracks: 1
- Train operators: ODEG

Construction
- Parking: yes
- Cycle facilities: no
- Accessible: yes

Other information
- Station code: 5180
- DS100 code: WRA
- IBNR: 8012737
- Category: 7
- Website: www.bahnhof.de

History
- Opened: 12 October 1897; 128 years ago

Services
Preceding station	Ostdeutsche Eisenbahn	Following station
Terminus	RB 13	Holdorf (Meckl) towards Parchim
Location
- Location within Mecklenburg-Vorpommern Location within Germany Location within Europe

Rehna station is a railway station in the municipality of Rehna, located in the Nordwestmecklenburg district in Mecklenburg-Vorpommern, Germany.
