= List of railway routes in Mecklenburg-Vorpommern =

Railway routemap of Mecklenburg-Vorpommern (as of December 2024)

The List of railway routes in Mecklenburg-Vorpommern provides a list of all railway routes in Mecklenburg-Vorpommern, northeastern Germany. This includes Intercity-Express, Intercity, Regional-Express and Regionalbahn services. In the route tables, the major stations are shown in bold text. Where intermediate stations are not given, these are replaced by three dots "...".

== Intercity services ==
The following Deutsche Bahn operated Intercity-Express (ICE) and Intercity (IC) services run through Mecklenburg-Vorpommern.

Line	Route		Stock	Frequency
=== Intercity Express (ICE) ===
ICE 15	Binz – Bergen auf Rügen – Stralsund – Greifswald – Züssow – Anklam – Pasewalk – Prenzlau – Eberswalde – Berlin Gesundbrunnen – Berlin – Berlin Südkreuz – Halle – Erfurt – Frankfurt – Darmstadt – Bensheim – Mannheim – Neustadt – Kaiserslautern – Homburg – Saarbrücken		ICE 1	Every two hours
ICE 18	Hamburg-Altona – Hamburg – Büchen – Ludwigslust – Wittenberge – Berlin – Berlin Südkreuz – Wittenberg – Bitterfeld – Coburg – Bamberg – Nuremberg – Donauwörth – Augsburg – Munich-Pasing – Munich		ICE 1	Every two hours
ICE 33	Hamburg-Altona – Hamburg – Schwerin – Bützow – Rostock – Ribnitz-Damgarten West – Velgast – Stralsund –	Bergen auf Rügen – Ostseebad Binz	ICE T	Every two hours
ICE 33	Hamburg-Altona – Hamburg – Schwerin – Bützow – Rostock – Ribnitz-Damgarten West – Velgast – Stralsund –	Greifswald	ICE T	Every two hours
=== Intercity (IC) ===
IC 17	(Chemnitz – Freiberg –) Dresden – Dresden-Neustadt – Elsterwerda – BER Airport – Berlin Südkreuz – Berlin – Berlin Gesundbrunnen – Oranienburg – Neustrelitz – Waren – Rostock		IC 2	Every two hours
IC 57	(Warnemünde –) **Rostock** – Bützow – Bad Kleinen – Schwerin – Ludwigslust –Wittenberge – Magdeburg – Köthen –Halle – Leipzig		IC 2	Two train pairs

== Regional services ==
The following Regional-Express and Regionalbahn services run through Mecklenburg-Vorpommern.

Line	Route	KBS	Rolling stock	Operator	Frequency
=== Regional-Express ===
RE 1	Hanse-Express; Hamburg – Büchen – Schwerin – Bad Kleinen – Bützow – Rostock	100	Bombardier Traxx P160 AC2 (class 146.3) + 5 double-deck coaches	DB Regio Nordost	120 min 60 min (Hamburg–Büchen); 60 min (only peak, Schwerin–Rostock along with RB 17)
RE 3	Stralsund – Greifswald – Züssow – Anklam – Pasewalk – Angermünde – Eberswalde – Berlin – Jüterbog – Lutherstadt Wittenberg	203	Class 112 / Bombardier Traxx P160 AC2 + 5 double-deck coaches	DB Regio Nordost	120 min (overlaid with RE 30 every hour from Stralsund to Angermünde); 60 min (Angermünde – Jüterbog)
RE 4	Stadttore-Linie; Lübeck – Bad Kleinen – Bützow – Güstrow – Neubrandenburg – Pasewalk – Szczecin / – Jatznick – Ueckermünde	175	Alstom Coradia LINT 41 (class 623); 2 × LINT 41 (Lübeck–Bad Kleinen)	DB Regio Nordost	60 min (Lübeck–Bad Kleinen, Bützow–Pasewalk); 120 min (Bad Kleinen–Bützow, Pasewalk–Stettin/Ueckermünde)
RE 5	Rostock – Güstrow – / Stralsund – Neustrelitz – Oranienburg – Berlin – Berlin Südkreuz	205	Twindexx Vario (class 445) Class 112 / Bombardier Traxx P160 AC2 + 4–5 double-deck coaches Bombardier Talent 2 (class 442.3) (Stralsund–Neustrelitz)	DB Regio Nordost	60 min (Stralsund–Berlin); 120 min (Rostock–Neustrelitz)
RE 7	Stralsund – Miltzow – Greifswald	203	Bombardier Talent 2	DB Regio Nordost	5 train pairs
RE 8	Wismar – Schwerin – Ludwigslust – Wittenberge – Nauen – Berlin – BER Airport	170	Stadler KISS	Ostdeutsche Eisenbahn	60 min (Wittenberge–BER Airport); 120 min (Wismar–Wittenberge, overlapping with RB 17 every hour to Ludwigslust)
RE 9	Rostock – Ribnitz-Damgarten – Velgast – Stralsund – Bergen – Lietzow – Sassnitz / Ostseebad Binz	190	Class 4746	Ostdeutsche Eisenbahn	120 min (Rostock–Stralsund); 60 min (Stralsund–Sassnitz/Ostseebad Binz)
RE 27	Bergen auf Rügen – Sassnitz Fährhafen	190	DWA LVT/S (class 672)	Hanseatische Eisenbahn	2 train pairs Sat and Sun
RE 30	Stralsund – Greifswald – Ducherow – Pasewalk – Prenzlau – Angermünde	203	DB Regio Nordost	Class 112/114/143/147 + 5 double-decker carriages	120 min (overlaid with RE 3)
RE 50	Rostock – Güstrow – Waren (Müritz) – Neustrelitz	205	DB Regio Nordost	Bombardier Talent 2 (class 442.3)	120 min
RE 51	Stralsund –Neustrelitz	205	DB Regio Nordost	Class 243 + 2 double-deck coaches	120 min
=== Regionalbahn ===
RB 11	Wismar – Neubukow – Bad Doberan – Rostock – Sanitz – Tessin	185	Siemens Desiro Classic	DB Regio	60 min
RB 12	(Bad Doberan –) Rostock – Rövershagen – Graal-Müritz / (– Ribnitz-Damgarten West)	184, 185, 190	Siemens Desiro Classic; Bombardier Talent 2 (Rostock–Ribnitz-Damgarten)	DB Regio	60 min (Rostock–Graal-Müritz, Rostock–Bad Doberan in the peak) (only some trains to/from Ribnitz-Damgarten)
RB 13	Rehna – Gadebusch – Schwerin – Crivitz – Parchim	152	Stadler Regio-Shuttle RS1	Ostdeutsche Eisenbahn	60 min (Schwerin-Parchim, Rehna-Schwerin in the peak) 120 min (Rehna–Schwerin in the non-peak, Schwerin-Parchim on the weekend)
RB 14	Hagenow Stadt – Hagenow Land – Ludwigslust – Parchim	172	Stadler Regio-Shuttle RS1	Ostdeutsche Eisenbahn	60 min (120 min on the weekend)
RB 15	Waren – Inselstadt Malchow (– Karow – Plau am See)	173	Stadler Regio-Shuttle RS1	Ostdeutsche Eisenbahn	120 min (some seasonal trains on weekends from/to Plau am See)
RB 16	Kleinseenbahn; Neustrelitz – Wesenberg – Mirow	173	DWA LVT/S	Hanseatische Eisenbahn (on behalf of ODEG)	120 min
RB 17	(Rostock) / Wismar – Bad Kleinen – Schwerin –Ludwigslust (– Wittenberge)	170	Bombardier Talent 2	DB Regio Nordost	120 min (overlapping with RE 8 every hour); 30 min (peak) (only some trains to/from Rostock)
RB 18	Rostock – Bad Kleinen – Schwerin	170	Desiro HC	Ostdeutsche Eisenbahn	120 min (with gaps)
RB 19	Parchim – Plau am See	172	Stadler Regio-Shuttle RS1	Ostdeutsche Eisenbahn	Seasonal operation
RB 23	Świnoujście – Ahlbeck – Heringsdorf – Zinnowitz – Wolgast – Züssow	193	Stadler GTW 1st generation (class 646)	DB Regio Nordost	60 min (Wolgast–Züssow, November–April Swinemünde–Wolgast); 30 min (May–October Swinemünde–Wolgast)
RB 24	Zinnowitz – Karlshagen – Peenemünde	194	Stadler GTW 1st generation (class 646)	DB Regio Nordost	60 min
RB 25	Velgast – Barth	192	Siemens Desiro Classic	DB Regio Nordost	60 min
RB 26	Zu(g)bringer; Bergen – Putbus – Lauterbach – Lauterbach Mole	198	Stadler Regio-Shuttle RS1	Pressnitztalbahn	60 min (May–August); 120 min (October–April)
RB 28	Rostock – Bützow – Bad Kleinen – Schwerin – Ludwigslust	100, 202	Bombardier Talent 2 (class 442.3)	DB Regio Nordost	Some trains
	Bäderbahn Molli; Bad Doberan – Heiligendamm – Kühlungsborn Ost – Kühlungsborn West	186	Class 99 + historical carriages	Bäderbahn Molli	60 min (April–October); 120 min (November–March)
RB 32	Rasender Roland; Lauterbach Putbus – Binz LB – Sellin – Baabe – Göhren	199	Class 99 + historical carriages	Pressnitztalbahn	60 min (Binz–Göhren in summer); 120 min (Lauterbach–Binz in summer, Putbus–Göhren in winter)
RB 74	Plau am See – Pritzwalk	174	DWA LVT/S (class 672)	Hanseatische Eisenbahn	Seasonal operation

=== Rostock S-Bahn ===
The Rostock S-Bahn is the local railway network of the Rostock agglomeration. It has 3 lines, all passing through Rostock Hauptbahnhof. The S-Bahn network reaches as far as Warnemünde in the north, and Güstrow in the south.

Line	Route	KBS	Rolling stock	Operator
S1	Warnemünde – Rostock	181	Bombardier Talent 2 (class 442.3)	DB Regio Nordost
S2	Warnemünde – Rostock – Güstrow	181, 182	Bombardier Talent 2 (class 442.3)	DB Regio Nordost
S3	Warnemünde – Rostock – Laage – Güstrow	181, 187	Bombardier Talent 2 (class 442.3)	DB Regio Nordost

== See also ==
- List of scheduled railway routes in Germany
