= Güstrow (district) =

Coordinates: 53°50′N 12°25′E

- District
- Coat of arms

- Country: Germany
- State: Mecklenburg-Vorpommern
- Disbanded: 2011
- Capital: Güstrow

Area
  - Total: 2,058 km^{2} (795 sq mi)

Population (2010-12-31)
  - Total: 98,992
  - Density: 48.10/km^{2} (124.6/sq mi)
- Time zone: UTC+01:00 (CET)
  - Summer (DST): UTC+02:00 (CEST)
- Vehicle registration: GÜ
- Website: kreis-gue.de

Güstrow (German pronunciation: [ˈɡʏstʁoː]) is a former district in Mecklenburg-Vorpommern, Germany. It was bounded by (from the north and clockwise) the districts of Bad Doberan, Nordvorpommern, Demmin, Müritz, Parchim, and Nordwestmecklenburg. The district was disbanded at the district reform of September 2011. Its territory has been part of the district of Rostock since.

== History ==
From 1621 to 1695, the present-day district was occupied by the small duchy of Mecklenburg-Güstrow. Afterwards large parts belonged to the duchy of Mecklenburg-Schwerin, a small portion to the duchy of Mecklenburg-Strelitz (see Mecklenburg).

Güstrow District was established in 1994 by merging the former districts of Güstrow, Teterow and Bützow. This district was merged with the district of Bad Doberan at the district reform of 4 September 2011, forming the new district of Rostock.

== Geography ==
The district was situated in the centre of Mecklenburg-Vorpommern. The Warnow river runs through the district from the southwest to the north. In the southern part of the district there are several lakes constituting the northern edge of the Müritz lakeland.

== Coat of arms ==
The coat of arms displays:
- the bull from the arms of Mecklenburg
- two crosiers representing the former bishopric of Schwerin

The colours are derived from the arms of the dissolved district of Bützow.

== Towns and municipalities ==
The subdivisions of the district were (situation August 2011):

Amt-free towns
1. Güstrow
2. Teterow

Ämter
1. Bützow Land; 1. Baumgarten; 2. Bernitt; 3. Bützow^{1, 2}; 4. Dreetz; 5. Jürgenshagen; 6. Klein Belitz; 7. Penzin; 8. Rühn; 9. Steinhagen; 10. Tarnow; 11. Warnow; 12. Zepelin; 2. Gnoien; 1. Altkalen; 2. Behren-Lübchin; 3. Boddin; 4. Finkenthal; 5. Gnoien^{1, 2}; 6. Lühburg; 7. Walkendorf; 8. Wasdow^{3}	3. Güstrow-Land (seat: Güstrow); 1. Glasewitz; 2. Groß Schwiesow; 3. Gülzow-Prüzen; 4. Gutow; 5. Klein Upahl; 6. Kuhs; 7. Lohmen; 8. Lüssow; 9. Mistorf; 10. Mühl Rosin; 11. Plaaz; 12. Reimershagen; 13. Sarmstorf; 14. Zehna; 4. Krakow am See; 1. Dobbin-Linstow; 2. Hoppenrade; 3. Krakow am See^{1, 2}; 4. Kuchelmiß; 5. Lalendorf; 6. Langhagen^{3}	5. Laage; 1. Diekhof; 2. Dolgen am See; 3. Hohen Sprenz; 4. Laage^{1, 2}; 5. Wardow; 6. Mecklenburgische Schweiz (seat: Teterow); 1. Alt Sührkow; 2. Dahmen; 3. Dalkendorf; 4. Groß Roge; 5. Groß Wokern; 6. Groß Wüstenfelde; 7. Hohen Demzin; 8. Jördenstorf; 9. Lelkendorf; 10. Prebberede; 11. Schorssow; 12. Schwasdorf; 13. Sukow-Levitzow; 14. Thürkow; 15. Warnkenhagen
^{1} - seat of the Amt; ^{2} - town; ^{3} - former town/municipality
