= Langensee =

Langensee may refer to:

- Langensee (Gülzow-Prüzen), a village in the parish of Gülzow-Prüzen in Güstrow district in Mecklenburg-Vorpommern, Germany
- Langensee (Holstein), a lake in Holstein Switzerland, Germany
- Langensee (Kleines Wiesental), a village in the parish of Kleines Wiesental in Lörrach district, Baden-Württemberg, Germany
- Langensee (Neukirch), a lake in the municipality of Neukirch in Bodensee district, Baden-Württemberg, Germany
- Lago Maggiore, a lake on the Italian/Swiss border
