= Hohen Sprenzer See =

Lake in Mecklenburg-Vorpommern, Germany

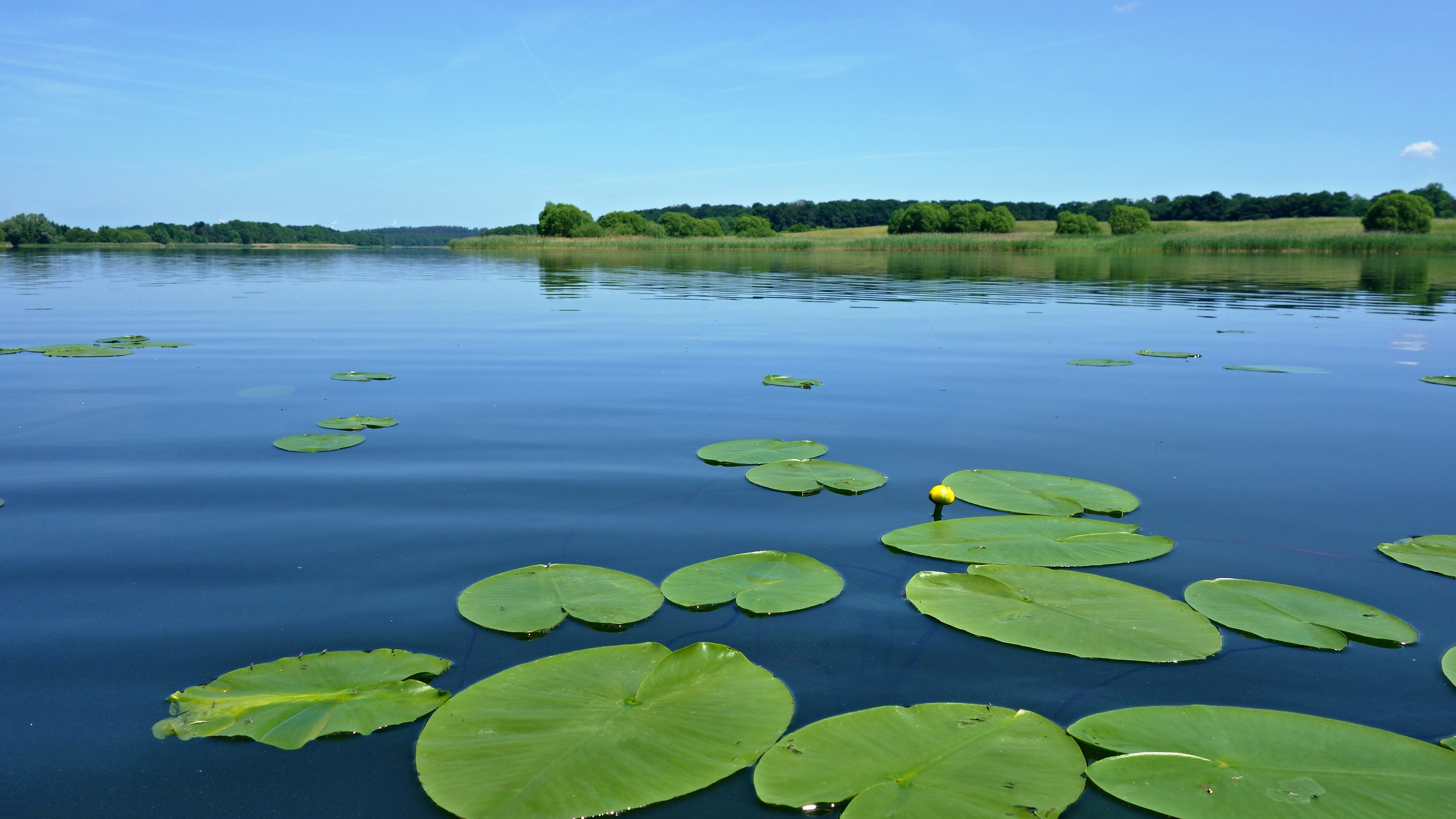
- View over the lake from the south at the exit of Hohen Sprenz.

- Location within Mecklenburg-Vorpommern
- Location: Rostock, Mecklenburg-Vorpommern
- Coordinates: 53°55′12.40″N 12°12′50.58″E
- Primary outflows: Mühlbach
- Basin countries: Germany
- Max. length: 2.8 km (1.7 mi)
- Max. width: 1.3 km (0.81 mi)
- Surface area: 2.25 km^{2} (0.87 sq mi)
- Average depth: 7 m (23 ft)
- Max. depth: 17.3 m (57 ft)
- Water volume: 15,780,000 m^{3} (557,000,000 cu ft)
- Surface elevation: 22.9 m (75 ft)

Hohen Sprenzer See is a lake in the Rostock district in Mecklenburg-Vorpommern, Germany. At an elevation of 22.9 m, its surface area is 2.25 km^{2}.
