= Stubbendorf =

- Municipality
- Location of Stubbendorf within Rostock district
- Interactive map of Stubbendorf
- Location within Germany Location within Mecklenburg-Vorpommern
- Coordinates: 54°5′N 12°33′E
- Country: Germany
- State: Mecklenburg-Vorpommern
- District: Rostock

Government
  - Mayor: Peter Albrecht

Area
  - Total: 9.65 km^{2} (3.73 sq mi)
- Elevation: 30 m (98 ft)

Population (2025-12-31)
  - Total: 179
  - Density: 18.5/km^{2} (48.0/sq mi)
- Time zone: UTC+01:00 (CET)
  - Summer (DST): UTC+02:00 (CEST)
- Postal codes: 18195
- Dialling codes: 038205
- Vehicle registration: LRO
- Website: Amt Tessin

Stubbendorf is a municipality in the Rostock district, in Mecklenburg-Vorpommern, Germany.
