= Diekhof =

- Ortsteil of Laage
- Interactive map of Diekhof
- Location within Germany Location within Mecklenburg-Vorpommern
- Coordinates: 53°51′54″N 12°22′11″E
- Country: Germany
- State: Mecklenburg-Vorpommern
- District: Rostock
- Town: Laage

Area
  - Total: 33.31 km^{2} (12.86 sq mi)
- Elevation: 50 m (160 ft)

Population (2017-12-31)
  - Total: 909
  - Density: 27.3/km^{2} (70.7/sq mi)
- Time zone: UTC+01:00 (CET)
  - Summer (DST): UTC+02:00 (CEST)
- Postal codes: 18299
- Dialling codes: 038455
- Vehicle registration: LRO
- Website: www.amt-laage.de

Diekhof (German pronunciation: [ˈdiːkhoːf]) is a village and a former municipality in the Rostock district, in Mecklenburg-Vorpommern, Germany. Since May 2019, it is part of the town Laage.
