= Inselsee =

Lake in Germany

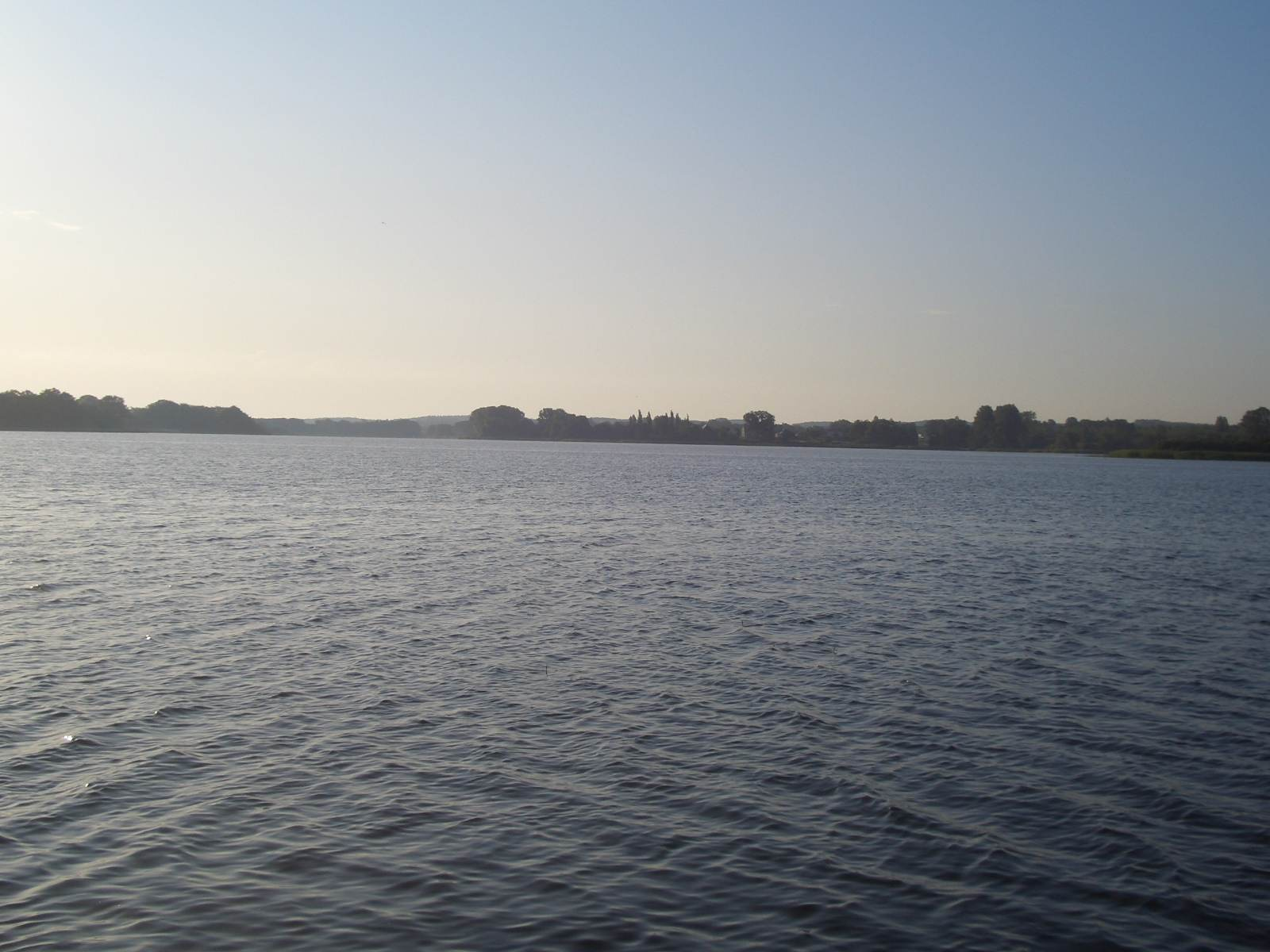

- Location within Mecklenburg-Vorpommern
- Location: Rostock, Mecklenburg-Vorpommern
- Coordinates: 53°45′49″N 12°11′23″E
- Primary inflows: subterrean, Teuchelbach
- Primary outflows: Mühlbach
- Basin countries: Germany
- Surface area: 4.58 km^{2} (1.77 sq mi)
- Average depth: 3.6 m (12 ft)
- Max. depth: 14.8 m (49 ft)
- Surface elevation: 11.4 m (37 ft)
- Settlements: Güstrow

Inselsee is a lake in the Rostock district in Mecklenburg-Vorpommern, Germany. At an elevation of 11.4 metres (37 ft 5 in), its surface area is 4.58 square kilometres (1.77 sq mi). The lake is divided into two parts by a small 60 hectares (0.23 sq mi) island, Schöninsel. While the northern part of the lake is relatively shallow, the average depth of the southern part is 3.6 metres (11 ft 10 in). Schöninsel is connected to the mainland by a bridge.

The lake is located in the town limits of Güstrow, south of the city center.

On the southern shore of Inselsee, the studio of Ernst Barlach, a German sculptor, is located. It was used by Barlach in the 1930s and currently functions as a museum.
