= Lohmen, Mecklenburg-Vorpommern =

Lohmen
- Municipality
- Location of Lohmen within Rostock district
- Interactive map of Lohmen
- Location within Germany Location within Mecklenburg-Vorpommern
- Coordinates: 53°40′59″N 12°05′23″E
- Country: Germany
- State: Mecklenburg-Vorpommern
- District: Rostock
- Municipal assoc.: Güstrow-Land

Government
  - Mayor: Bernd Dikau

Area
  - Total: 34.77 km^{2} (13.42 sq mi)
- Elevation: 38 m (125 ft)

Population (2025-12-31)
  - Total: 808
  - Density: 23.2/km^{2} (60.2/sq mi)
- Time zone: UTC+01:00 (CET)
  - Summer (DST): UTC+02:00 (CEST)
- Postal codes: 18276
- Dialling codes: 038458
- Vehicle registration: LRO
- Website: www.lohmen.de

Lohmen is a municipality in the Rostock district, in Mecklenburg-Vorpommern, Germany.
