= Sukow-Levitzow =

- Municipality
- Location of Sukow-Levitzow within Rostock district
- Interactive map of Sukow-Levitzow
- Location within Germany Location within Mecklenburg-Vorpommern
- Coordinates: 53°51′11″N 12°35′59″E
- Country: Germany
- State: Mecklenburg-Vorpommern
- District: Rostock
- Municipal assoc.: Mecklenburgische Schweiz

Government
  - Mayor: Walter Bommer

Area
  - Total: 20.23 km^{2} (7.81 sq mi)
- Elevation: 25 m (82 ft)

Population (2025-12-31)
  - Total: 503
  - Density: 24.9/km^{2} (64.4/sq mi)
- Time zone: UTC+01:00 (CET)
  - Summer (DST): UTC+02:00 (CEST)
- Postal codes: 17168
- Dialling codes: 039975
- Vehicle registration: LRO
- Website: www.amt-mecklenburgische-schweiz.de

Sukow-Levitzow is a municipality in the Rostock district, in Mecklenburg-Vorpommern, Germany.
