= Kuhs =

- Municipality
- Location of Kuhs within Rostock district
- Interactive map of Kuhs
- Location within Germany Location within Mecklenburg-Vorpommern
- Coordinates: 53°52′00″N 12°13′59″E
- Country: Germany
- State: Mecklenburg-Vorpommern
- District: Rostock
- Municipal assoc.: Güstrow-Land

Government
  - Mayor: Ulf Kalisch

Area
  - Total: 13.74 km^{2} (5.31 sq mi)
- Elevation: 25 m (82 ft)

Population (2025-12-31)
  - Total: 319
  - Density: 23.2/km^{2} (60.1/sq mi)
- Time zone: UTC+01:00 (CET)
  - Summer (DST): UTC+02:00 (CEST)
- Postal codes: 18276
- Dialling codes: 038454
- Vehicle registration: LRO
- Website: www.amt-guestrow-land.de

Kuhs is a municipality in the Rostock district, in Mecklenburg-Vorpommern, Germany. It is located northwest of the city of Güstrow.

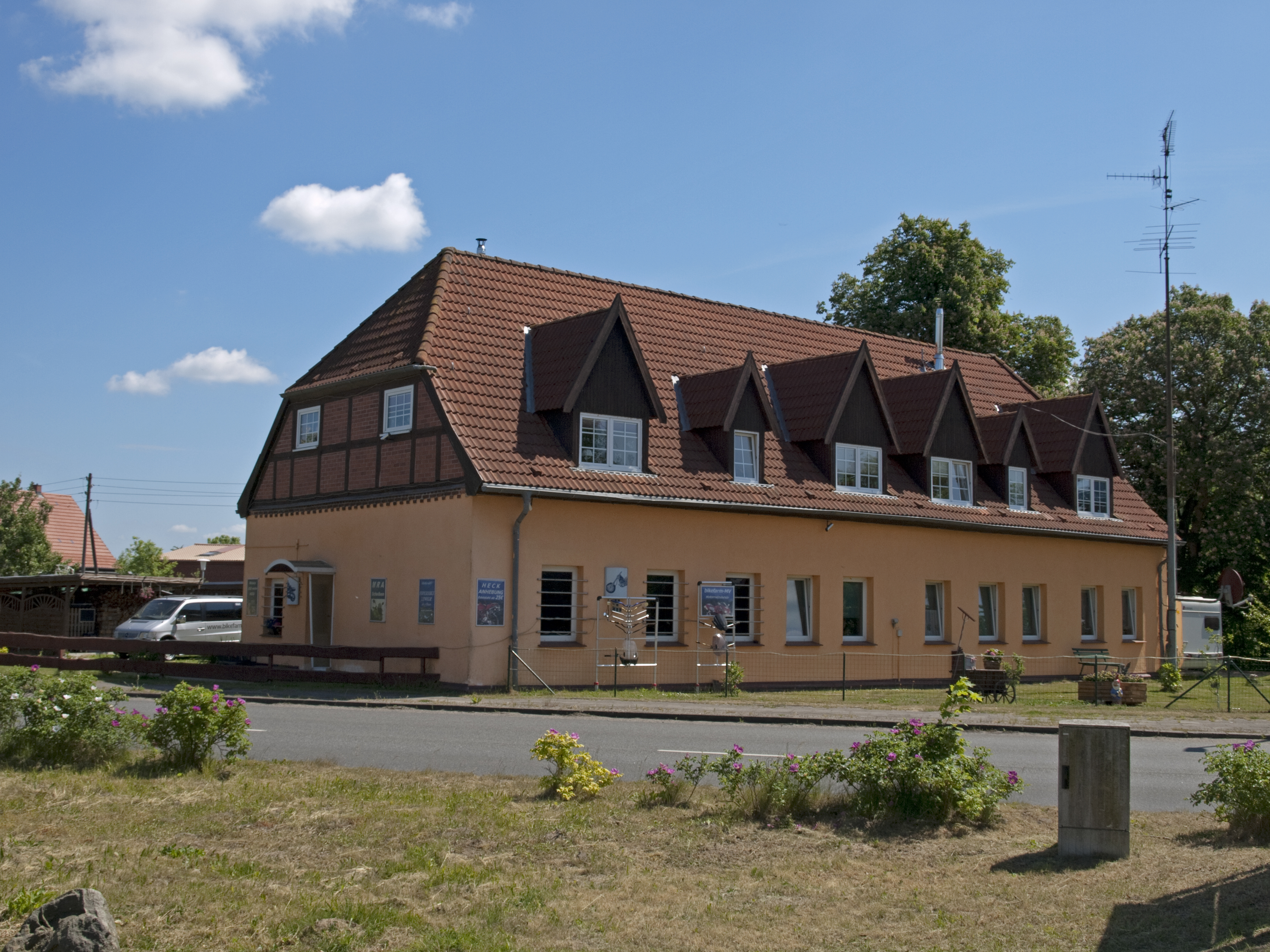
Landhotel Kuhs
