= Dolgen am See =

- Municipality
- Location of Dolgen am See within Rostock district
- Interactive map of Dolgen am See
- Location within Germany Location within Mecklenburg-Vorpommern
- Coordinates: 53°57′N 12°16′E
- Country: Germany
- State: Mecklenburg-Vorpommern
- District: Rostock
- Municipal assoc.: Laage

Government
  - Mayor: Dagmar Meyer

Area
  - Total: 33.02 km^{2} (12.75 sq mi)
- Elevation: 32 m (105 ft)

Population (2025-12-31)
  - Total: 612
  - Density: 18.5/km^{2} (48.0/sq mi)
- Time zone: UTC+01:00 (CET)
  - Summer (DST): UTC+02:00 (CEST)
- Postal codes: 18299
- Dialling codes: 038454
- Vehicle registration: LRO
- Website: www.amt-laage.de

Dolgen am See is a municipality in the Rostock district, in Mecklenburg-Vorpommern, Germany.
