= Gnoien (Amt) =

Amt in Rostock district, Mecklenburg-Vorpommern, Germany

- Amt
- Map of Rostock highlighting Gnoien
- Interactive map of Gnoien
- Location within Germany Location within Mecklenburg-Vorpommern
- Coordinates: 53°58′N 12°43′E
- Country: Germany
- State: Mecklenburg-Vorpommern
- District: Rostock
- Seat: Gnoien
- Subdivisions: 5 municipalities

Area
  - Total: 244.99 km^{2} (94.59 sq mi)

Population (2025-12-31)
  - Total: 5,640
  - Density: 23.0/km^{2} (59.6/sq mi)
- Time zone: UTC+01:00 (CET)
  - Summer (DST): UTC+02:00 (CEST)
- Website: www.amt-gnoien.de

Gnoien is an Amt in the district of Rostock, in Mecklenburg-Vorpommern, Germany. The seat of the Amt is in Gnoien.

The Amt Gnoien consists of the following municipalities:

1. Altkalen
2. Behren-Lübchin
3. Finkenthal
4. Gnoien
5. Walkendorf
