= Jürgenshagen =

- Municipality
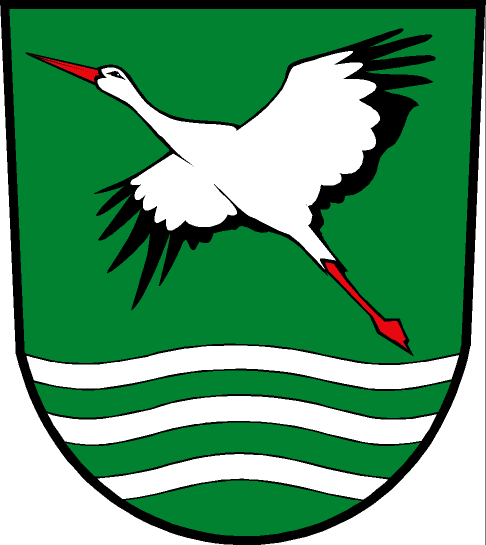
- Coat of arms

- Location of Jürgenshagen within Rostock district
- Interactive map of Jürgenshagen
- Location within Germany Location within Mecklenburg-Vorpommern
- Coordinates: 53°57′00″N 11°54′00″E
- Country: Germany
- State: Mecklenburg-Vorpommern
- District: Rostock
- Municipal assoc.: Bützow-Land

Government
  - Mayor: Elfriede Schmidt

Area
  - Total: 42.25 km^{2} (16.31 sq mi)
- Elevation: 15 m (49 ft)

Population (2025-12-31)
  - Total: 1,128
  - Density: 26.70/km^{2} (69.15/sq mi)
- Time zone: UTC+01:00 (CET)
  - Summer (DST): UTC+02:00 (CEST)
- Postal codes: 18246
- Dialling codes: 038466
- Vehicle registration: LRO
- Website: www.amt-buetzow-land.de

Jürgenshagen is a municipality in the Rostock district of Mecklenburg-Vorpommern, Germany.
