= Lalendorf =

- Municipality
- Coat of arms

- Location of Lalendorf within Rostock district
- Interactive map of Lalendorf
- Location within Germany Location within Mecklenburg-Vorpommern
- Coordinates: 53°45′07″N 12°23′20″E
- Country: Germany
- State: Mecklenburg-Vorpommern
- District: Rostock
- Municipal assoc.: Krakow am See

Government
  - Mayor: Matthias Streeb (CDU)

Area
  - Total: 139.30 km^{2} (53.78 sq mi)
- Elevation: 34 m (112 ft)

Population (2025-12-31)
  - Total: 3,441
  - Density: 24.70/km^{2} (63.98/sq mi)
- Time zone: UTC+01:00 (CET)
  - Summer (DST): UTC+02:00 (CEST)
- Postal codes: 18279
- Dialling codes: 038452
- Vehicle registration: LRO
- Website: www.amt-krakow-am-see.de

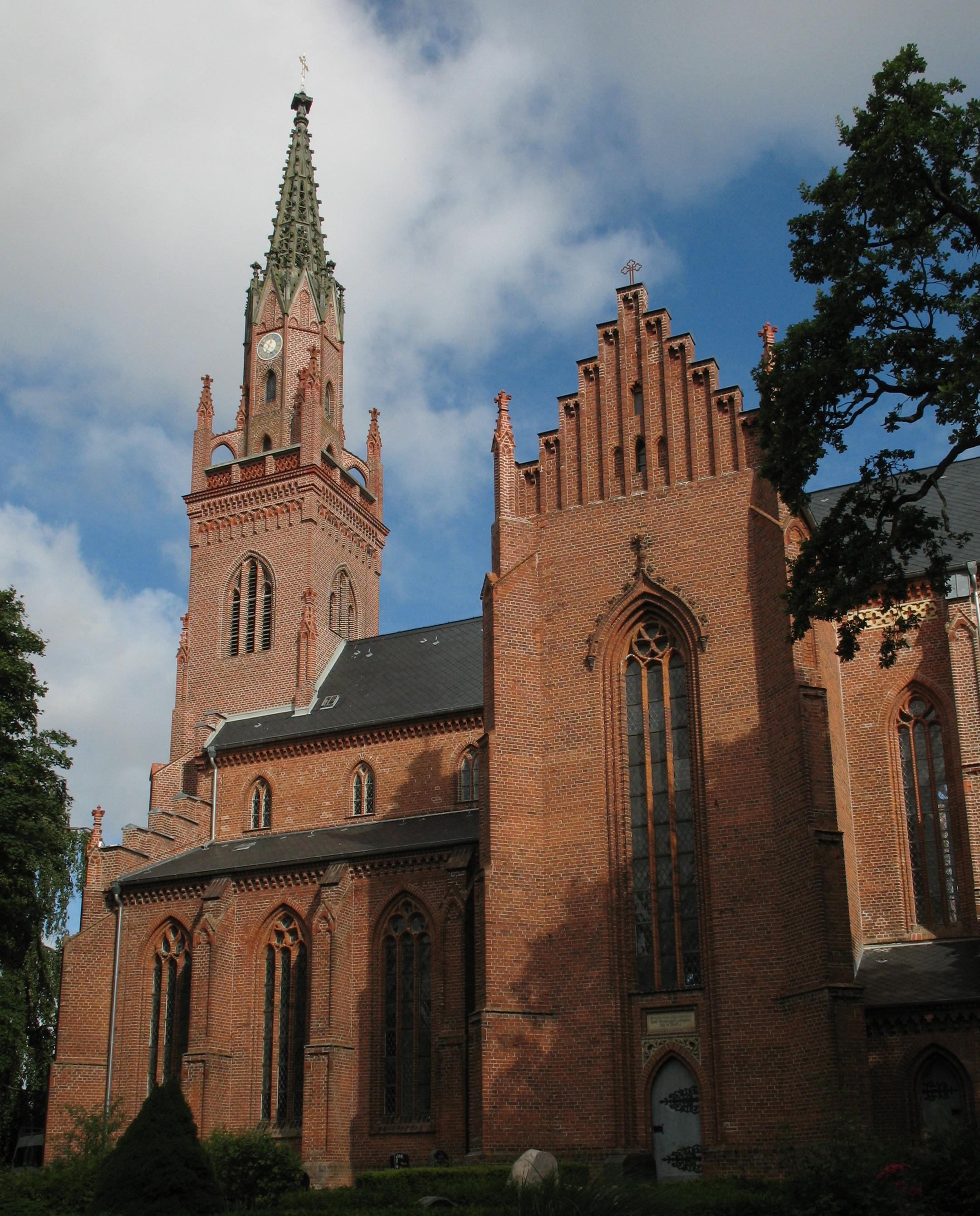
Church in Schlieffenberg

Lalendorf is a municipality in the Rostock district, in Mecklenburg-Vorpommern, Germany.

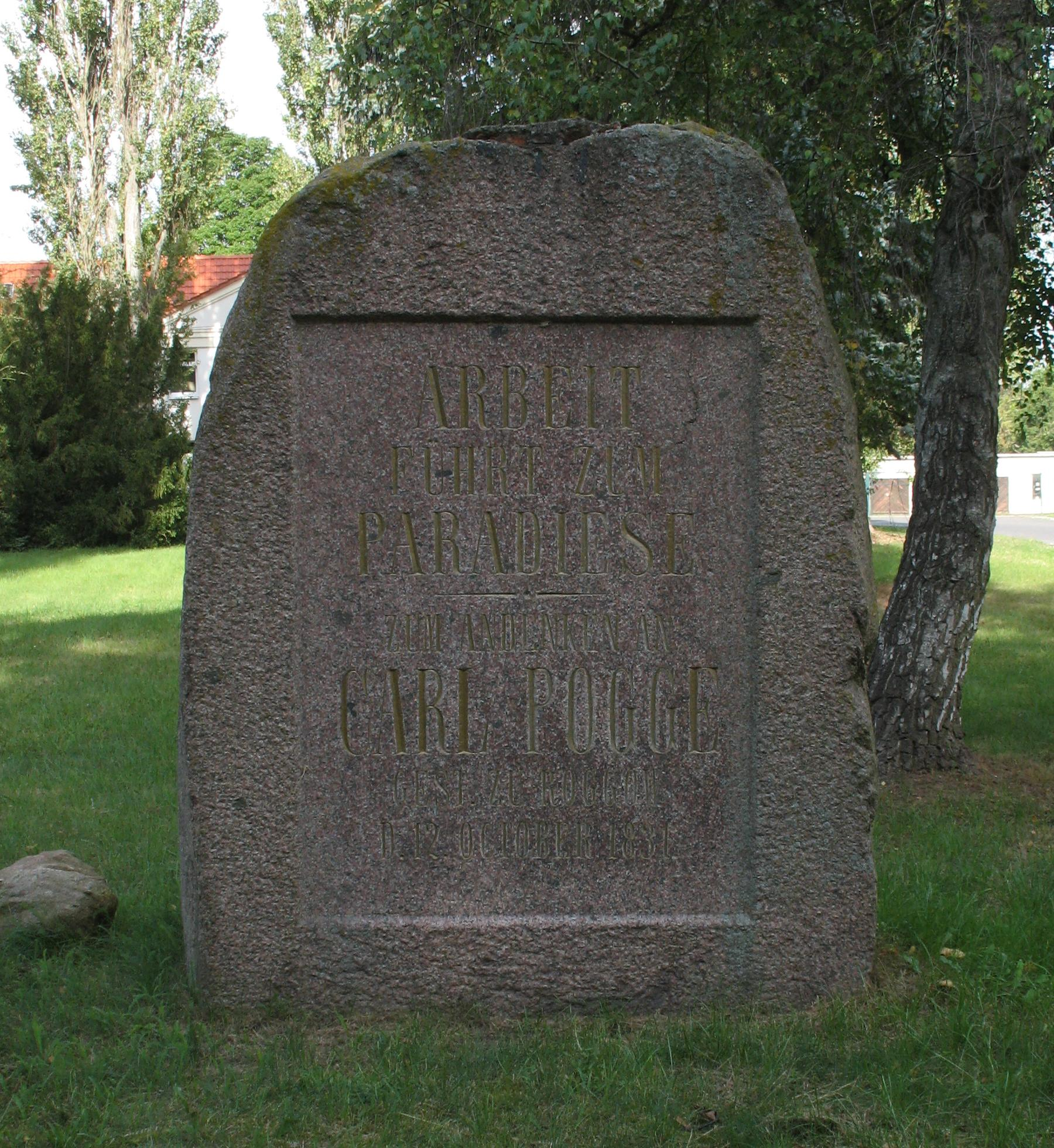
Memorial stone for Carl Pogge in Roggow
