= Güstrow-Land =

Administrative division in Germany

- Amt
- Map of Rostock highlighting Güstrow-Land
- Interactive map of Güstrow-Land
- Location within Germany Location within Mecklenburg-Vorpommern
- Coordinates: 53°46′N 12°08′E
- Country: Germany
- State: Mecklenburg-Vorpommern
- District: Rostock
- Seat: Güstrow
- Subdivisions: 14 municipalities

Area
  - Total: 335 km^{2} (129 sq mi)

Population (2025-12-31)
  - Total: 9,463
  - Density: 28.2/km^{2} (73.2/sq mi)
- Time zone: UTC+01:00 (CET)
  - Summer (DST): UTC+02:00 (CEST)
- Website: www.amt-guestrow-land.de

Güstrow-Land is an Amt in the district of Rostock, in Mecklenburg-Vorpommern, Germany. The seat of the Amt is in Güstrow, itself not part of the Amt.

The Amt Güstrow-Land consists of the following municipalities:

1. Glasewitz
2. Groß Schwiesow
3. Gülzow-Prüzen
4. Gutow
5. Klein Upahl
6. Kuhs
7. Lohmen
8. Lüssow
9. Mistorf
10. Mühl Rosin
11. Plaaz
12. Reimershagen
13. Sarmstorf
14. Zehna

In May 2022, a total of 9,573 people lived in the Güstrow-Land district.
