= Hoppenrade =

- Municipality
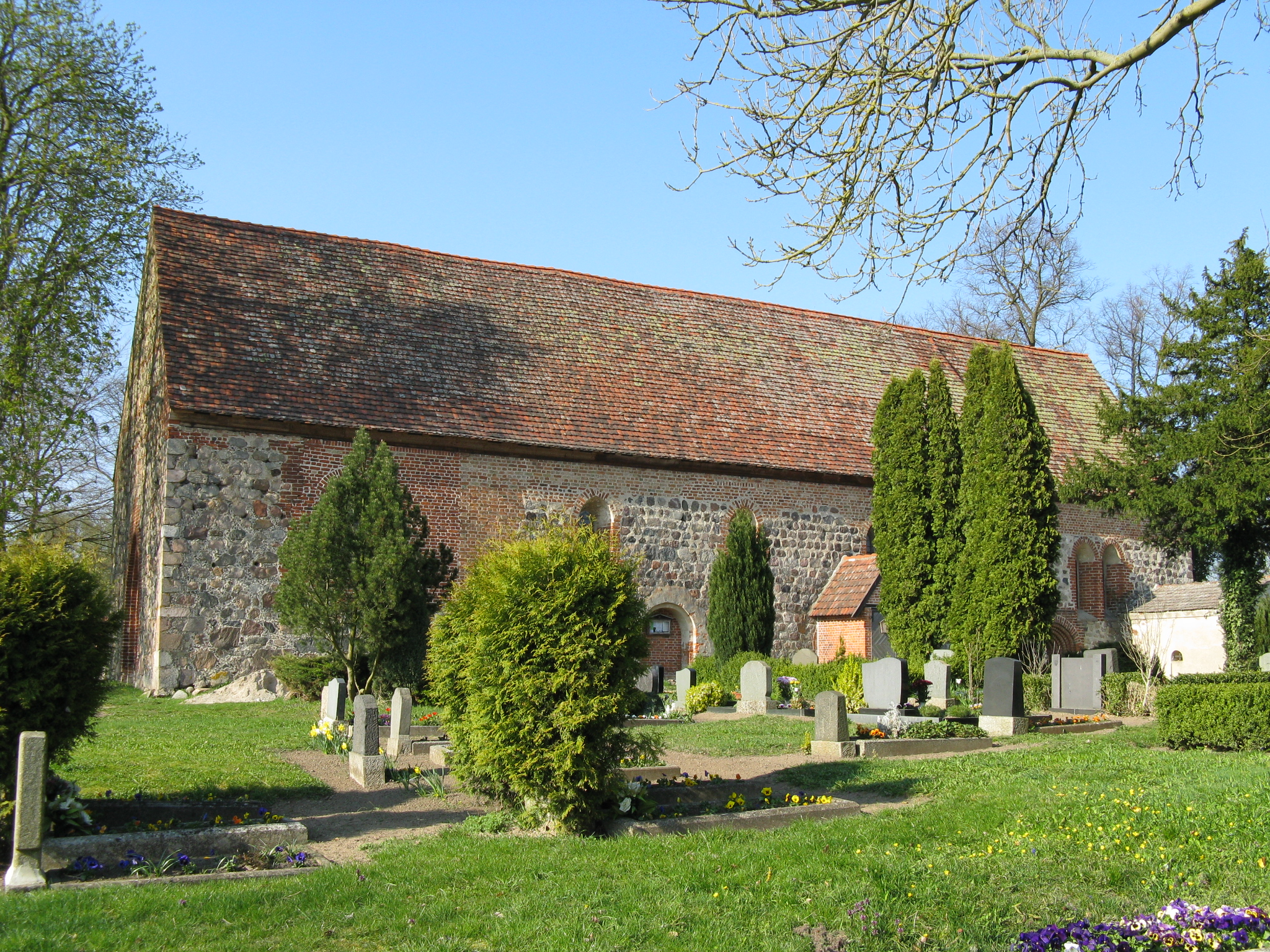
- Medieval village church in Hoppenrade

- Location of Hoppenrade within Rostock district
- Interactive map of Hoppenrade
- Location within Germany Location within Mecklenburg-Vorpommern
- Coordinates: 53°43′59″N 12°16′00″E
- Country: Germany
- State: Mecklenburg-Vorpommern
- District: Rostock
- Municipal assoc.: Krakow am See

Government
  - Mayor: Birgit Kaspar

Area
  - Total: 28.76 km^{2} (11.10 sq mi)
- Elevation: 25 m (82 ft)

Population (2025-12-31)
  - Total: 570
  - Density: 20/km^{2} (51/sq mi)
- Time zone: UTC+01:00 (CET)
  - Summer (DST): UTC+02:00 (CEST)
- Postal codes: 18292
- Dialling codes: 038451
- Vehicle registration: LRO
- Website: www.amt-krakow-am-see.de

Hoppenrade is a municipality in the Rostock district, in Mecklenburg-Vorpommern, Germany.
