= Krakow am See (Amt) =

Amt in Mecklenburg-Vorpommern, Germany

- Amt
- Map of Rostock highlighting Krakow am See
- Interactive map of Krakow am See
- Location within Germany Location within Mecklenburg-Vorpommern
- Coordinates: 53°41′N 12°22′E
- Country: Germany
- State: Mecklenburg-Vorpommern
- District: Rostock
- Seat: Krakow am See
- Subdivisions: 5 municipalities

Area
  - Total: 358.12 km^{2} (138.27 sq mi)

Population (2025-12-31)
  - Total: 8,456
  - Density: 23.61/km^{2} (61.16/sq mi)
- Time zone: UTC+01:00 (CET)
  - Summer (DST): UTC+02:00 (CEST)
- Website: www.amt-krakow-am-see.de

Krakow am See is an Amt in the district of Rostock, in Mecklenburg-Vorpommern, Germany. The seat of the Amt is in Krakow am See.

The Amt Krakow am See consists of the following municipalities:

1. Dobbin-Linstow
2. Hoppenrade
3. Krakow am See
4. Kuchelmiß
5. Lalendorf
