= Zehna =

- Municipality
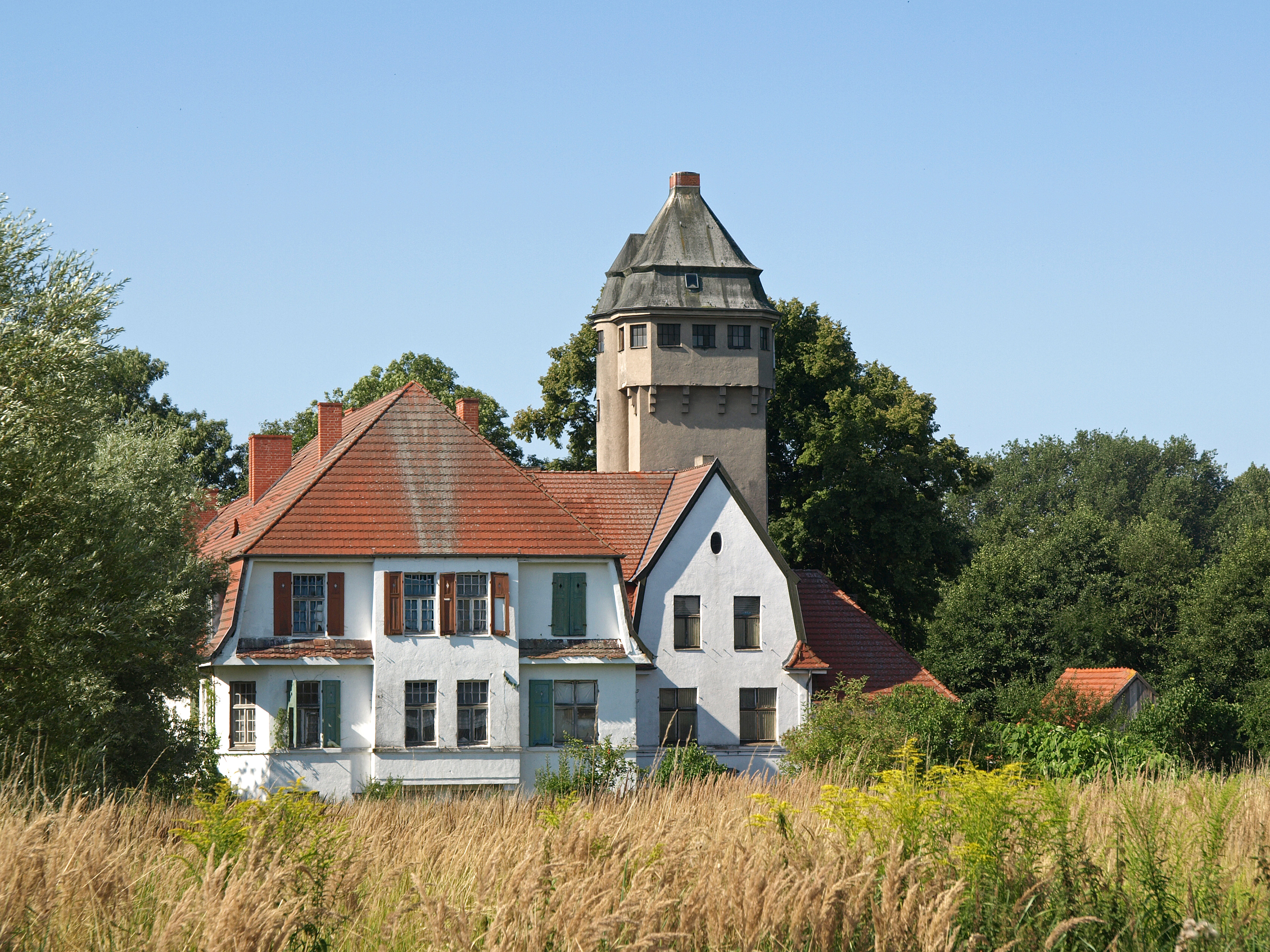
- Manor house

- Location of Zehna within Rostock district
- Interactive map of Zehna
- Location within Germany Location within Mecklenburg-Vorpommern
- Coordinates: 53°43′00″N 12°09′00″E
- Country: Germany
- State: Mecklenburg-Vorpommern
- District: Rostock
- Municipal assoc.: Güstrow-Land

Government
  - Mayor: Fred Lange

Area
  - Total: 25.76 km^{2} (9.95 sq mi)
- Elevation: 52 m (171 ft)

Population (2025-12-31)
  - Total: 647
  - Density: 25.1/km^{2} (65.1/sq mi)
- Time zone: UTC+01:00 (CET)
  - Summer (DST): UTC+02:00 (CEST)
- Postal codes: 18276
- Dialling codes: 038458
- Vehicle registration: LRO
- Website: www.amt-guestrow-land.de

Zehna is a municipality in the Rostock district, in Mecklenburg-Vorpommern, Germany.
