= Glasewitz =

- Municipality
- Location of Glasewitz within Rostock district
- Interactive map of Glasewitz
- Location within Germany Location within Mecklenburg-Vorpommern
- Coordinates: 53°49′12″N 12°16′59″E
- Country: Germany
- State: Mecklenburg-Vorpommern
- District: Rostock
- Municipal assoc.: Güstrow-Land

Government
  - Mayor: Harald Berndt

Area
  - Total: 15.59 km^{2} (6.02 sq mi)
- Elevation: 17 m (56 ft)

Population (2025-12-31)
  - Total: 395
  - Density: 25.3/km^{2} (65.6/sq mi)
- Time zone: UTC+01:00 (CET)
  - Summer (DST): UTC+02:00 (CEST)
- Postal codes: 18276
- Dialling codes: 038455
- Vehicle registration: LRO
- Website: www.amt-guestrow-land.de

Glasewitz (German pronunciation: [ˈɡlaːzəvɪts]) is a municipality in the Rostock district, in Mecklenburg-Vorpommern, Germany.
