= Warnkenhagen =

- Municipality
- Location of Warnkenhagen within Rostock district
- Interactive map of Warnkenhagen
- Location within Germany Location within Mecklenburg-Vorpommern
- Coordinates: 53°50′24″N 12°26′50″E
- Country: Germany
- State: Mecklenburg-Vorpommern
- District: Rostock
- Municipal assoc.: Mecklenburgische Schweiz

Government
  - Mayor: Thomas Holm

Area
  - Total: 19.49 km^{2} (7.53 sq mi)
- Elevation: 45 m (148 ft)

Population (2025-12-31)
  - Total: 307
  - Density: 15.8/km^{2} (40.8/sq mi)
- Time zone: UTC+01:00 (CET)
  - Summer (DST): UTC+02:00 (CEST)
- Postal codes: 17168
- Dialling codes: 039976
- Vehicle registration: LRO
- Website: www.amt-mecklenburgische-schweiz.de

Warnkenhagen is a municipality in the Rostock district, in Mecklenburg-Vorpommern, Germany.
