= Penzin =

- Municipality
- Location of Penzin within Rostock district
- Interactive map of Penzin
- Location within Germany Location within Mecklenburg-Vorpommern
- Coordinates: 53°54′50″N 11°55′35″E
- Country: Germany
- State: Mecklenburg-Vorpommern
- District: Rostock
- Municipal assoc.: Bützow-Land

Government
  - Mayor: Bärbel Kraatz

Area
  - Total: 6.08 km^{2} (2.35 sq mi)
- Elevation: 18 m (59 ft)

Population (2025-12-31)
  - Total: 136
  - Density: 22.4/km^{2} (57.9/sq mi)
- Time zone: UTC+01:00 (CET)
  - Summer (DST): UTC+02:00 (CEST)
- Postal codes: 18249
- Dialling codes: 038464
- Vehicle registration: LRO
- Website: www.amt-buetzow-land.de

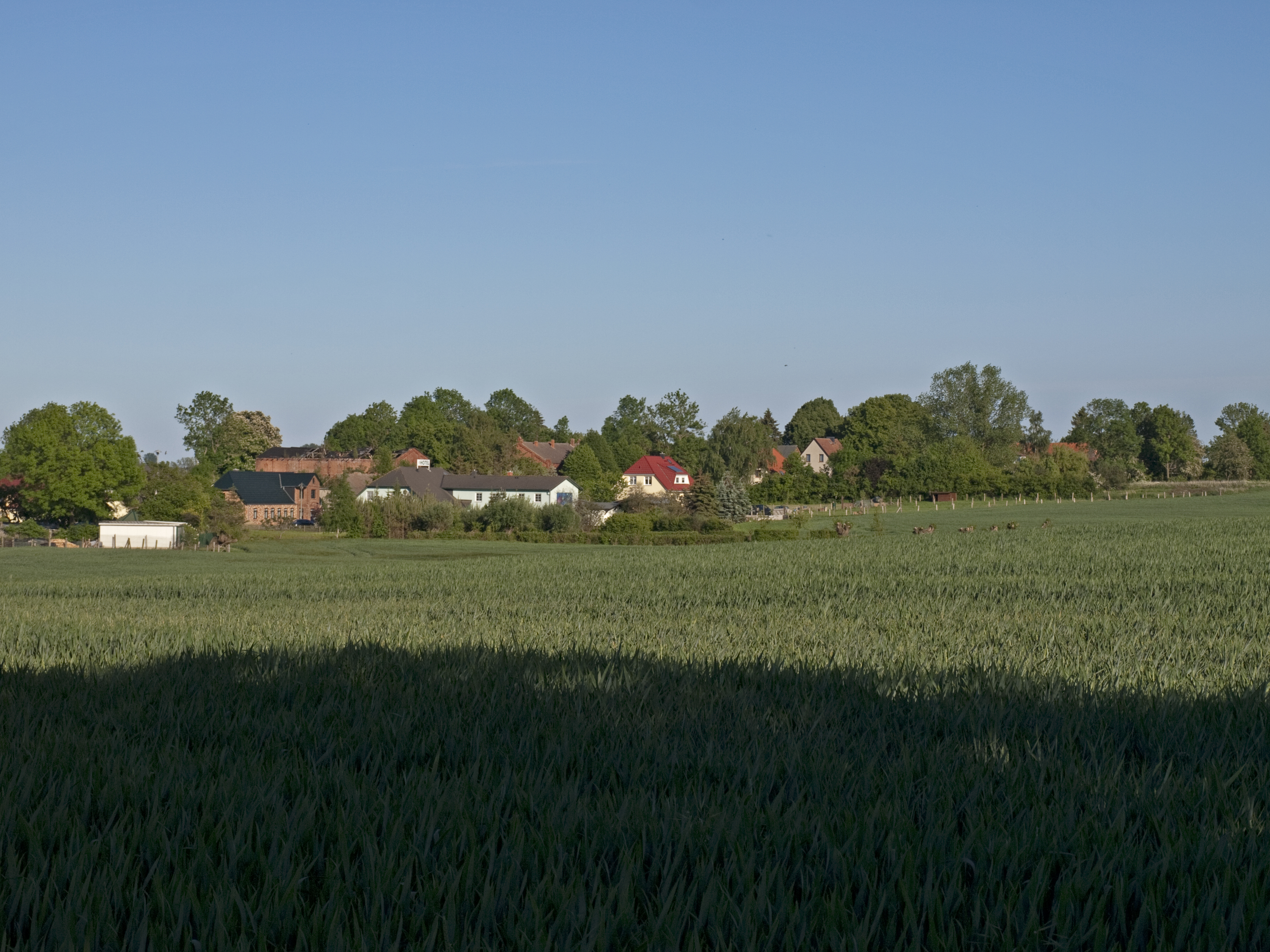
A panoramic view of Penzin

Penzin is a municipality in the Rostock district, in Mecklenburg-Vorpommern, Germany. It is located at the northeast of Germany and belongs to the Amt of Bützow-Land.
