= Gutow, Rostock =

- Municipality
- Coat of arms

- Location of Gutow, Rostock within Rostock district
- Interactive map of Gutow, Rostock
- Location within Germany Location within Mecklenburg-Vorpommern
- Coordinates: 53°45′47″N 12°07′59″E
- Country: Germany
- State: Mecklenburg-Vorpommern
- District: Rostock
- Municipal assoc.: Güstrow-Land

Government
  - Mayor: Martin Poppe

Area
  - Total: 23.42 km^{2} (9.04 sq mi)
- Elevation: 16 m (52 ft)

Population (2025-12-31)
  - Total: 1,022
  - Density: 43.64/km^{2} (113.0/sq mi)
- Time zone: UTC+01:00 (CET)
  - Summer (DST): UTC+02:00 (CEST)
- Postal codes: 18276
- Dialling codes: 03843
- Vehicle registration: LRO
- Website: www.amt-guestrow-land.de

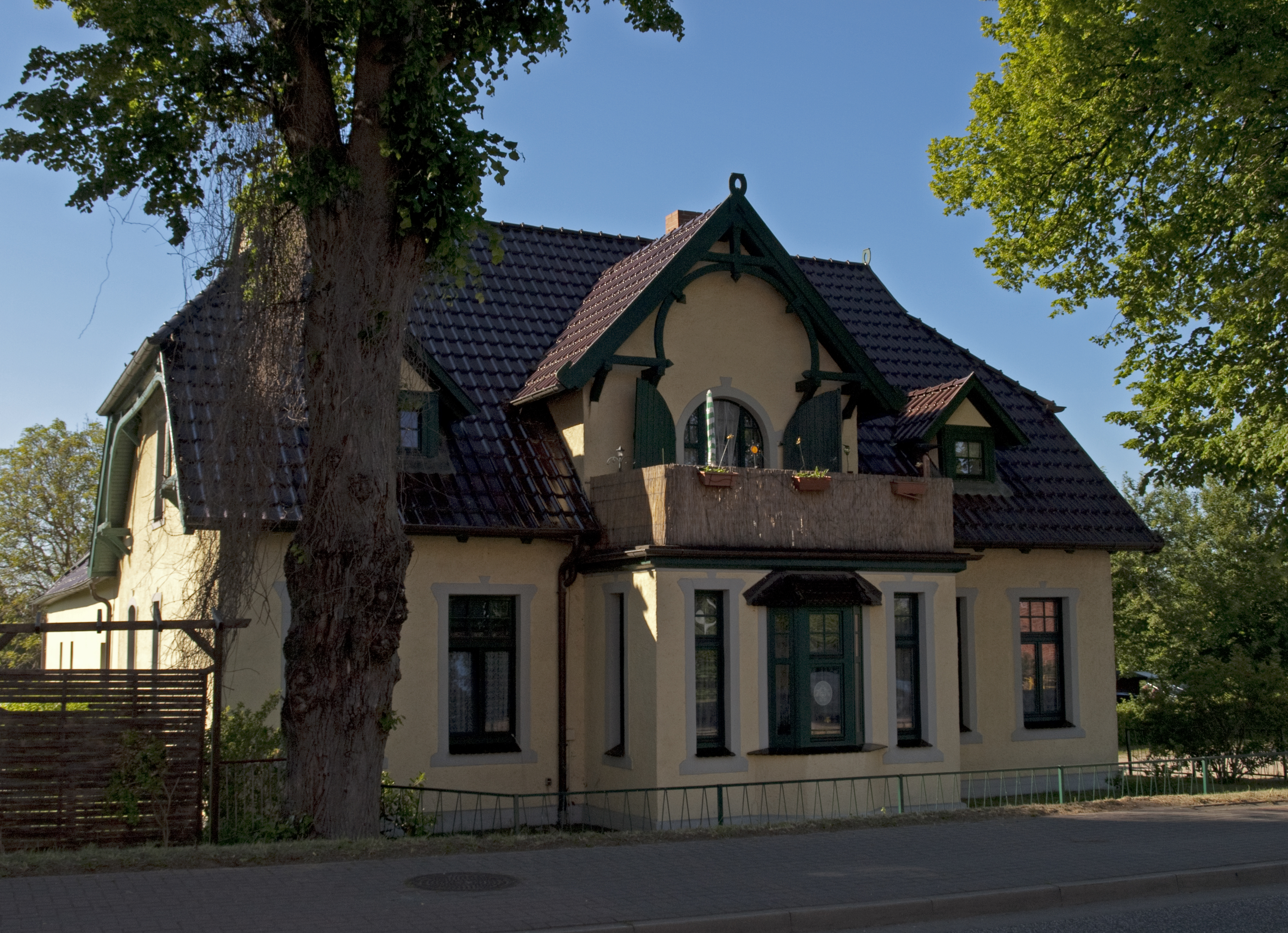
16 Goldberger Strasse

Gutow is a municipality in the Rostock district of Mecklenburg-Vorpommern, Germany. It is situated several kilometers southwest of the city of Güstrow.
