= Bernitt =

- Municipality
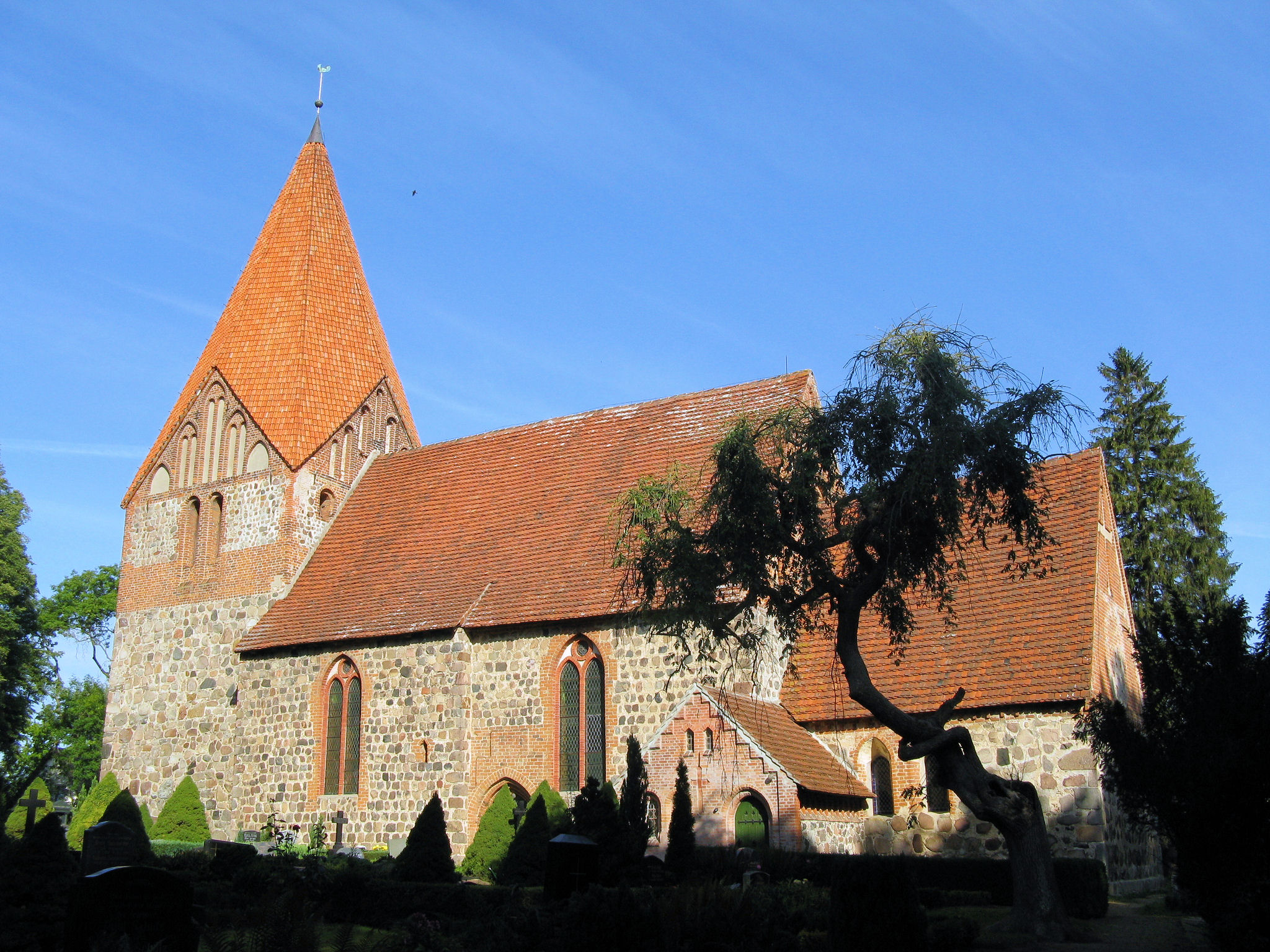
- Medieval village church in Bernitt

- Coat of arms

- Location of Bernitt within Rostock district
- Interactive map of Bernitt
- Location within Germany Location within Mecklenburg-Vorpommern
- Coordinates: 53°53′56″N 11°52′59″E
- Country: Germany
- State: Mecklenburg-Vorpommern
- District: Rostock
- Municipal assoc.: Bützow-Land

Government
  - Mayor: Erhard Fink

Area
  - Total: 73.33 km^{2} (28.31 sq mi)
- Elevation: 59 m (194 ft)

Population (2025-12-31)
  - Total: 1,536
  - Density: 20.95/km^{2} (54.25/sq mi)
- Time zone: UTC+01:00 (CET)
  - Summer (DST): UTC+02:00 (CEST)
- Postal codes: 18249
- Dialling codes: 038464
- Vehicle registration: LRO
- Website: www.amt-buetzow-land.de

Bernitt is a municipality in the Rostock district, in Mecklenburg-Vorpommern, Germany.
