= Bützow-Land =

Amt in Mecklenburg-Vorpommern, Germany

- Amt
- Map of Rostock highlighting Bützow-Land
- Interactive map of Bützow-Land
- Location within Germany Location within Mecklenburg-Vorpommern
- Coordinates: 53°51′N 11°59′E
- Country: Germany
- State: Mecklenburg-Vorpommern
- District: Rostock
- Seat: Bützow
- Subdivisions: 12 municipalities

Area
  - Total: 383.35 km^{2} (148.01 sq mi)

Population (2025-12-31)
  - Total: 15,978
  - Density: 41.680/km^{2} (107.95/sq mi)
- Time zone: UTC+01:00 (CET)
  - Summer (DST): UTC+02:00 (CEST)
- Website: amt-buetzow-land.eu

Bützow-Land is an Amt in the district of Rostock, in Mecklenburg-Vorpommern, Germany. The seat of the Amt is in Bützow.

The Amt Bützow-Land consists of the following municipalities:

1. Baumgarten
2. Bernitt
3. Bützow
4. Dreetz
5. Jürgenshagen
6. Klein Belitz
7. Penzin
8. Rühn
9. Steinhagen
10. Tarnow
11. Warnow
12. Zepelin
