= Groß Schwiesow =

- Municipality
- Location of Groß Schwiesow within Rostock district
- Interactive map of Groß Schwiesow
- Location within Germany Location within Mecklenburg-Vorpommern
- Coordinates: 53°51′00″N 12°05′35″E
- Country: Germany
- State: Mecklenburg-Vorpommern
- District: Rostock
- Municipal assoc.: Güstrow-Land

Government
  - Mayor: Inge Kiel

Area
  - Total: 12.50 km^{2} (4.83 sq mi)
- Elevation: 34 m (112 ft)

Population (2025-12-31)
  - Total: 284
  - Density: 22.7/km^{2} (58.8/sq mi)
- Time zone: UTC+01:00 (CET)
  - Summer (DST): UTC+02:00 (CEST)
- Postal codes: 18276
- Dialling codes: 038453
- Vehicle registration: LRO
- Website: www.amt-guestrow-land.de

Groß Schwiesow is a municipality in the Rostock district, in Mecklenburg-Vorpommern, Germany. It is located to the northwest of the city of Güstrow.

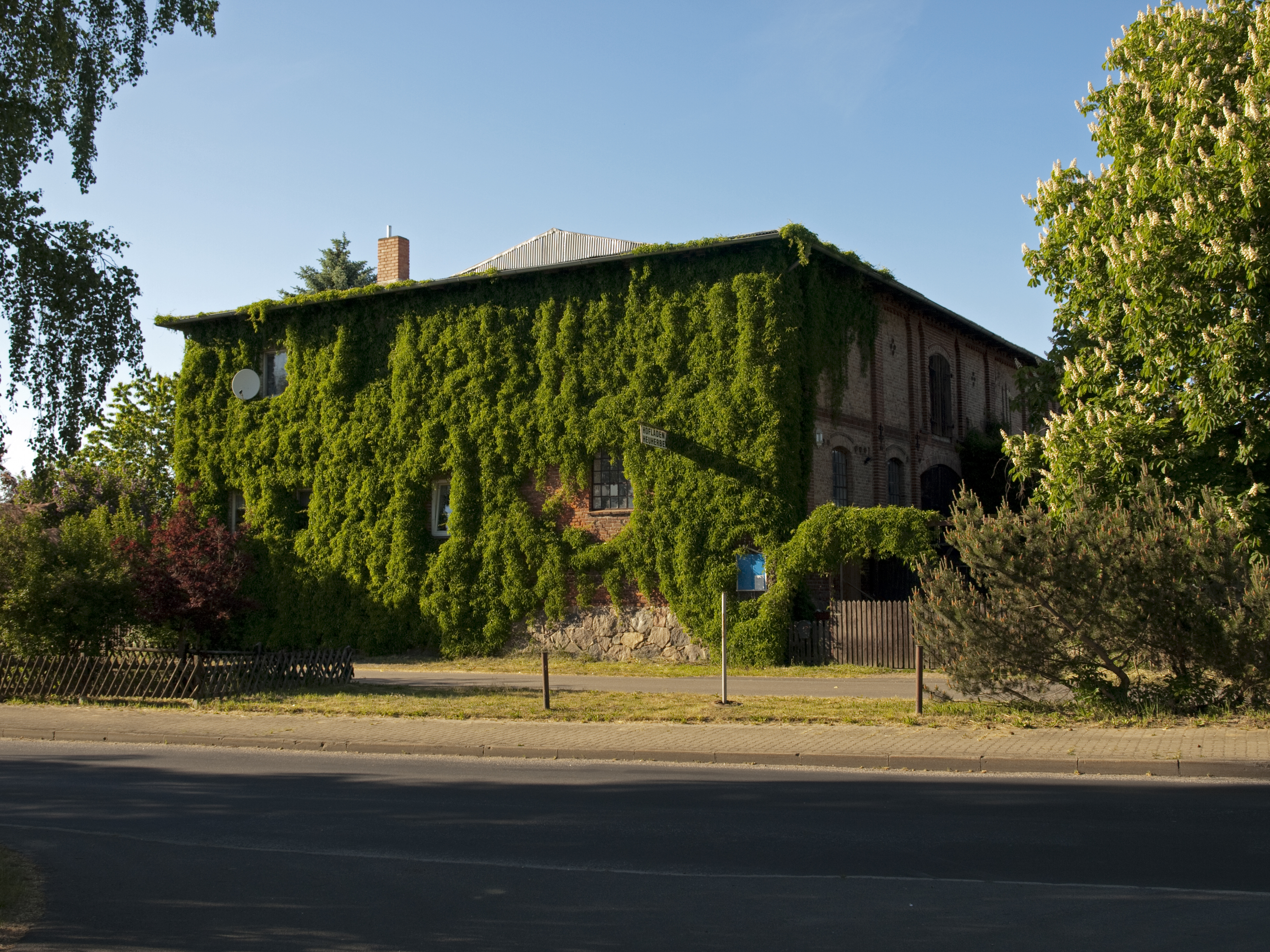
The building at 3, Bützower Strasse
