= Warnow (Güstrow) =

- Municipality
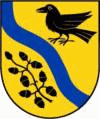
- Coat of arms

- Location of Warnow within Rostock district
- Interactive map of Warnow
- Location within Germany Location within Mecklenburg-Vorpommern
- Coordinates: 53°47′N 11°53′E
- Country: Germany
- State: Mecklenburg-Vorpommern
- District: Rostock
- Municipal assoc.: Bützow-Land

Government
  - Mayor: Siegfried Hoffmann

Area
  - Total: 42.18 km^{2} (16.29 sq mi)
- Elevation: 30 m (98 ft)

Population (2025-12-31)
  - Total: 917
  - Density: 21.7/km^{2} (56.3/sq mi)
- Time zone: UTC+01:00 (CET)
  - Summer (DST): UTC+02:00 (CEST)
- Postal codes: 18249
- Dialling codes: 038462
- Vehicle registration: LRO
- Website: www.amt-buetzow-land.de

Warnow (German pronunciation: [ˈvaʁno]) is a municipality in the Rostock district, in Mecklenburg-Vorpommern, Germany.

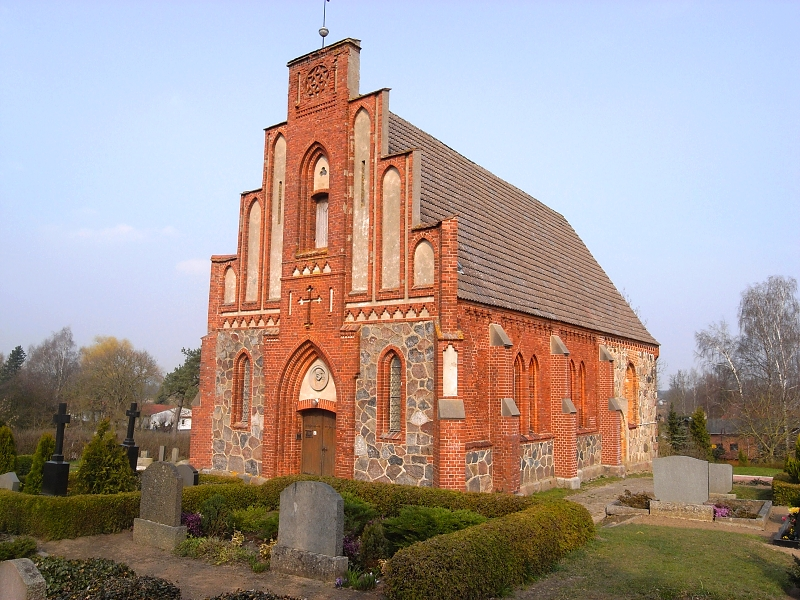
Church in Warnow

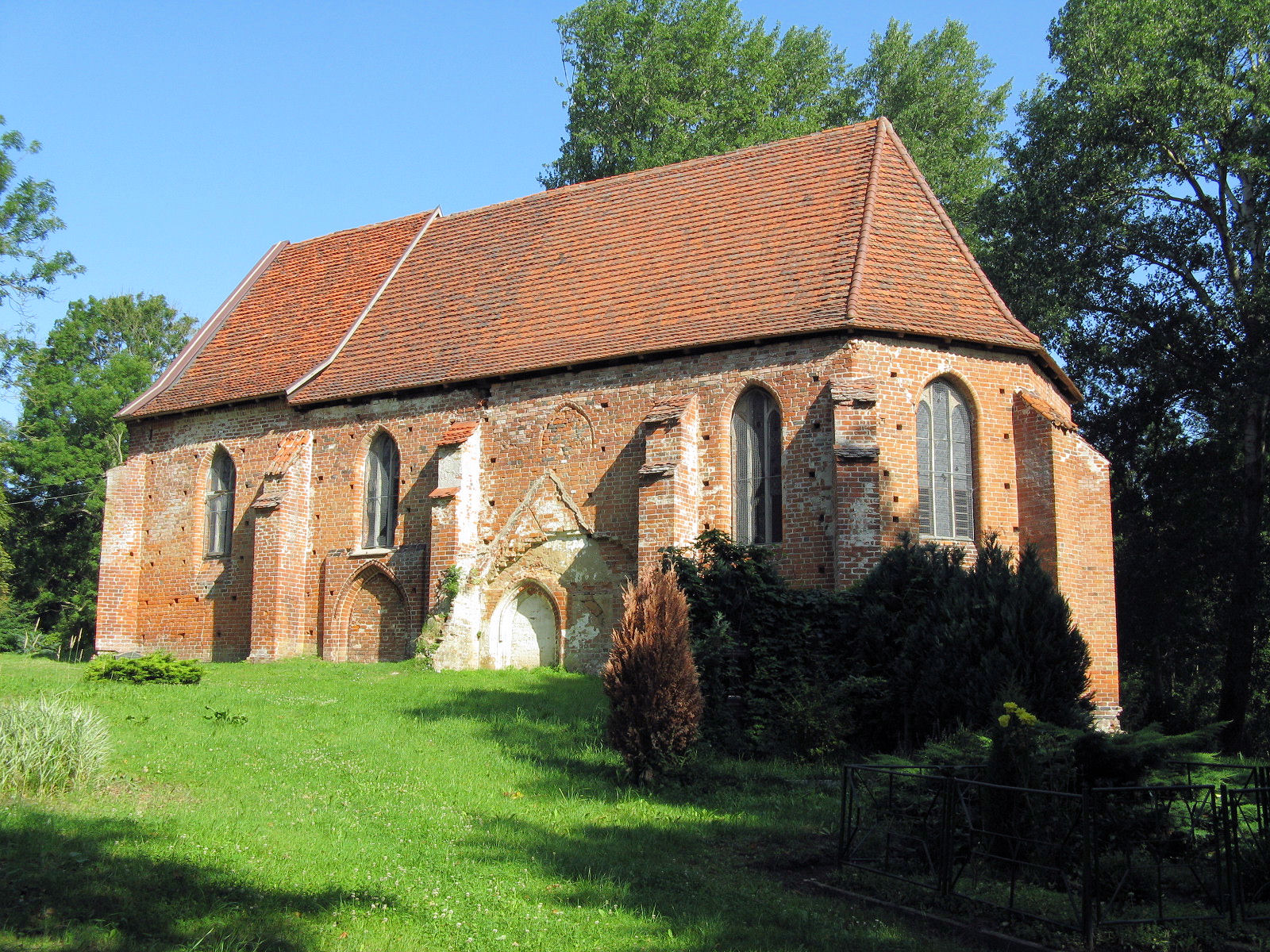
Church in Eickelberg

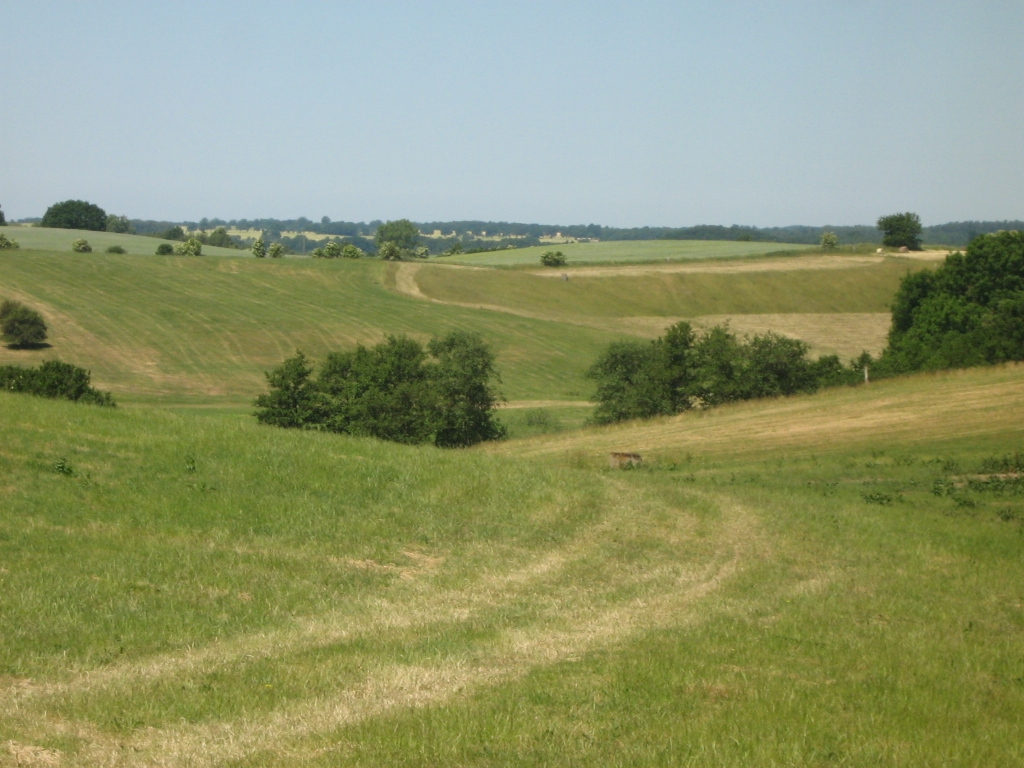
Landscape at Schlockow, Warnow municipality
