= Laage (Amt) =

Collective municipality in Mecklenburg-West Pomerania, Germany

- Amt
- Map of Rostock highlighting Laage
- Interactive map of Laage
- Location within Germany Location within Mecklenburg-Vorpommern
- Coordinates: 53°56′N 12°21′E
- Country: Germany
- State: Mecklenburg-Vorpommern
- District: Rostock
- Seat: Laage
- Subdivisions: 4 municipalities

Area
  - Total: 240.08 km^{2} (92.70 sq mi)

Population (2025-12-31)
  - Total: 8,728
  - Density: 36.35/km^{2} (94.16/sq mi)
- Time zone: UTC+01:00 (CET)
  - Summer (DST): UTC+02:00 (CEST)
- Website: www.amt-laage.de

Laage is an Amt in the district of Rostock, in Mecklenburg-Vorpommern, Germany. The seat of the Amt, that was formed in 2004, is in the town Laage.

The Amt Laage consists of the following municipalities:

1. Dolgen am See
2. Hohen Sprenz
3. Laage
4. Wardow
