= Jördenstorf =

- Municipality
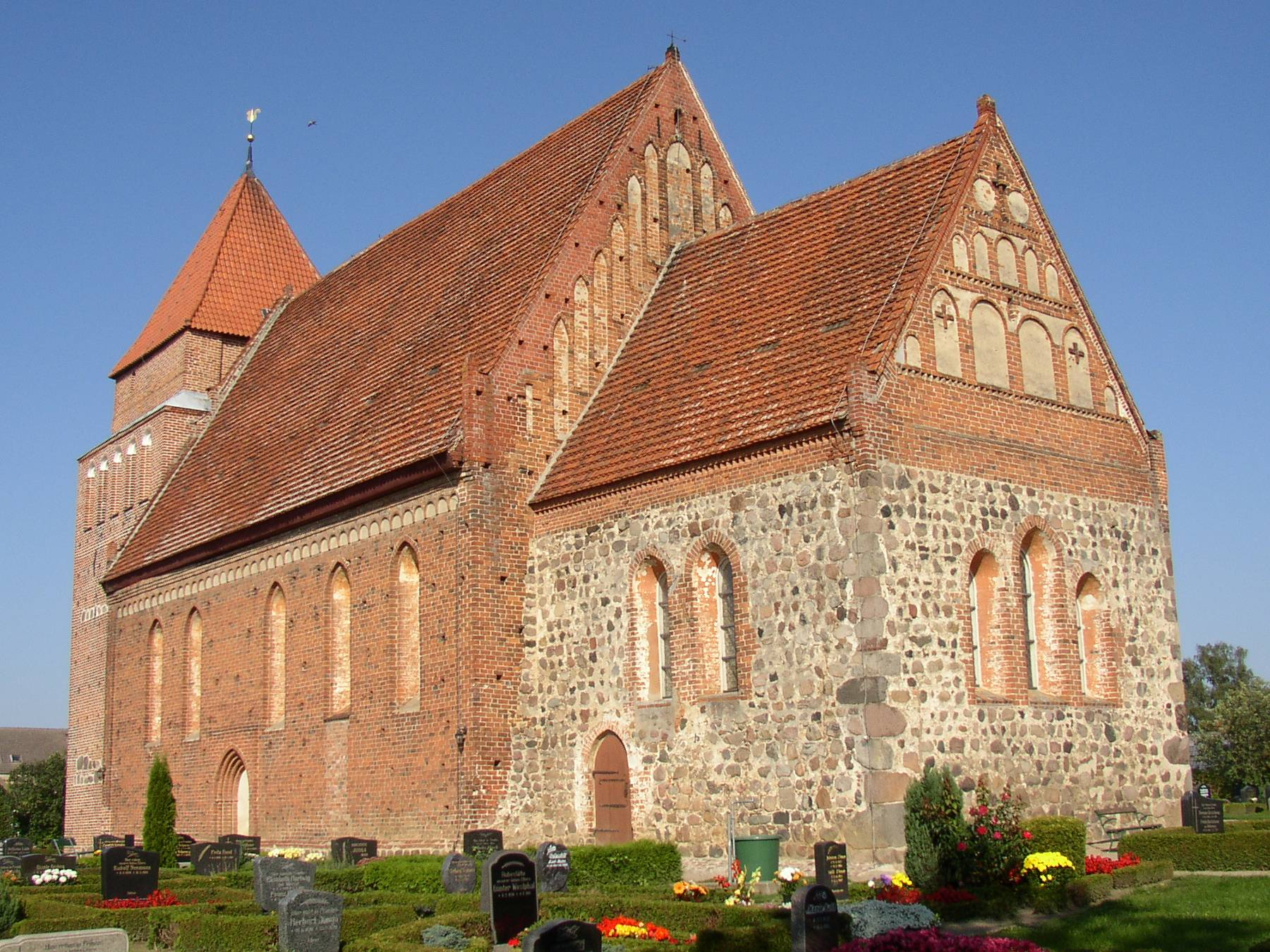
- Medieval village church in Jördenstorf

- Location of Jördenstorf within Rostock district
- Interactive map of Jördenstorf
- Location within Germany Location within Mecklenburg-Vorpommern
- Coordinates: 53°52′59″N 12°37′00″E
- Country: Germany
- State: Mecklenburg-Vorpommern
- District: Rostock
- Municipal assoc.: Mecklenburgische Schweiz

Government
  - Mayor: Hannelore Langhof

Area
  - Total: 27.64 km^{2} (10.67 sq mi)
- Elevation: 47 m (154 ft)

Population (2025-12-31)
  - Total: 941
  - Density: 34.0/km^{2} (88.2/sq mi)
- Time zone: UTC+01:00 (CET)
  - Summer (DST): UTC+02:00 (CEST)
- Postal codes: 17168
- Dialling codes: 039977
- Vehicle registration: LRO
- Website: www.amt-mecklenburgische-schweiz.de

Jördenstorf (German pronunciation: [ˈjœɐ̯dn̩sˌtɔɐ̯f]) is a municipality in the Rostock district, in Mecklenburg-Vorpommern, Germany.

== History ==
After the Duchy of Mecklenburg-Schwerin emancipated its Jewish subjects in 1813 Israel Jacobson bought two feudal manor estates, Klenz and Gehmkendorf and the peasant village Klein Markow (all three are components of today's Jördenstorf). In 1816 he swore his oath of fealty to Frederick Francis I, Grand Duke of Mecklenburg-Schwerin, thus becoming the first Jew with permanent seat and vote in the Estates of the Realm of a German state. As liege lord he also held the patrimonial jurisdiction over his vassal peasants and the patronage of the pertaining Lutheran church, which he conveyed to a Lutheran confidant. In 1817 he further acquired the neighbouring estates of Grambow and Tressow. His life and work, especially this part, is commemorated - among other things - in the permanent exhibition on Mecklenburg's Jewish history in the museum Engelscher Hof and the half-timbered former synagogue in Röbel, 66 km south of Jördenstorf.
