= Behren-Lübchin =

- Municipality
- Location of Behren-Lübchin within Rostock district
- Interactive map of Behren-Lübchin
- Location within Germany Location within Mecklenburg-Vorpommern
- Coordinates: 54°01′N 12°40′E
- Country: Germany
- State: Mecklenburg-Vorpommern
- District: Rostock
- Municipal assoc.: Gnoien

Government
  - Mayor: Birger Ziegler

Area
  - Total: 68.96 km^{2} (26.63 sq mi)
- Elevation: 19 m (62 ft)

Population (2025-12-31)
  - Total: 951
  - Density: 13.8/km^{2} (35.7/sq mi)
- Time zone: UTC+01:00 (CET)
  - Summer (DST): UTC+02:00 (CEST)
- Postal codes: 17179
- Dialling codes: 039971
- Vehicle registration: LRO
- Website: www.amt-gnoien.de

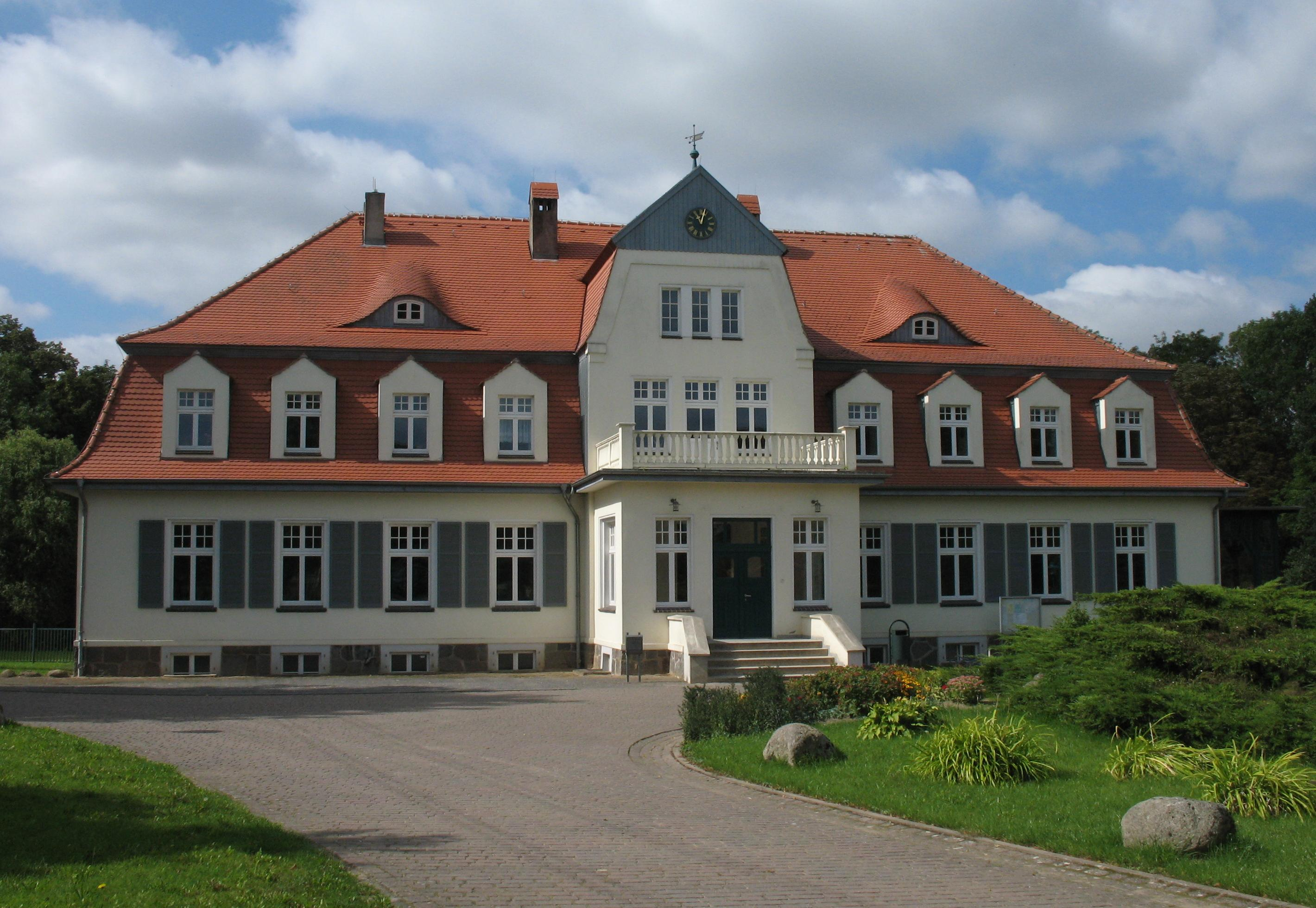
Manor in Wasdow

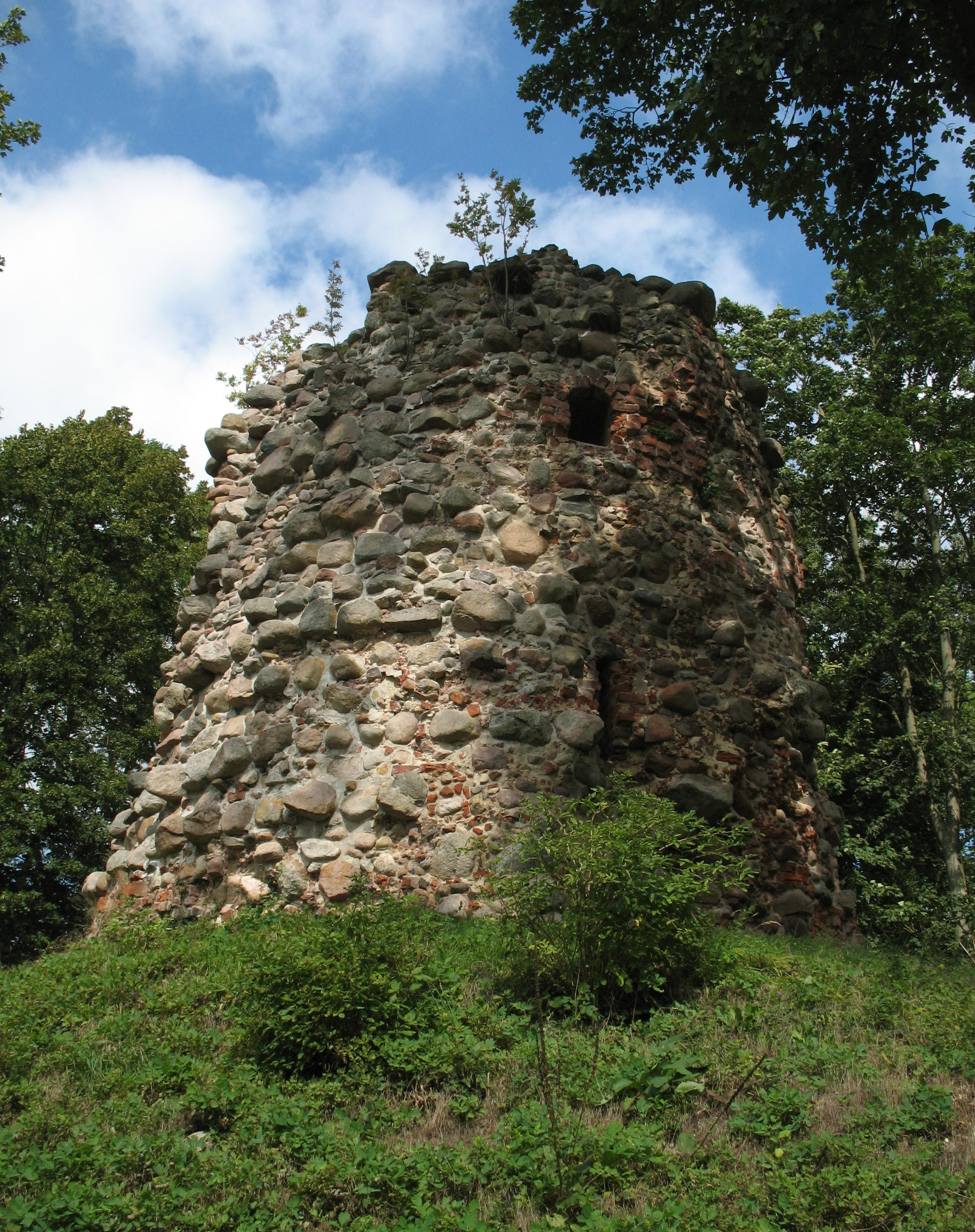
Bergfried in Wasdow

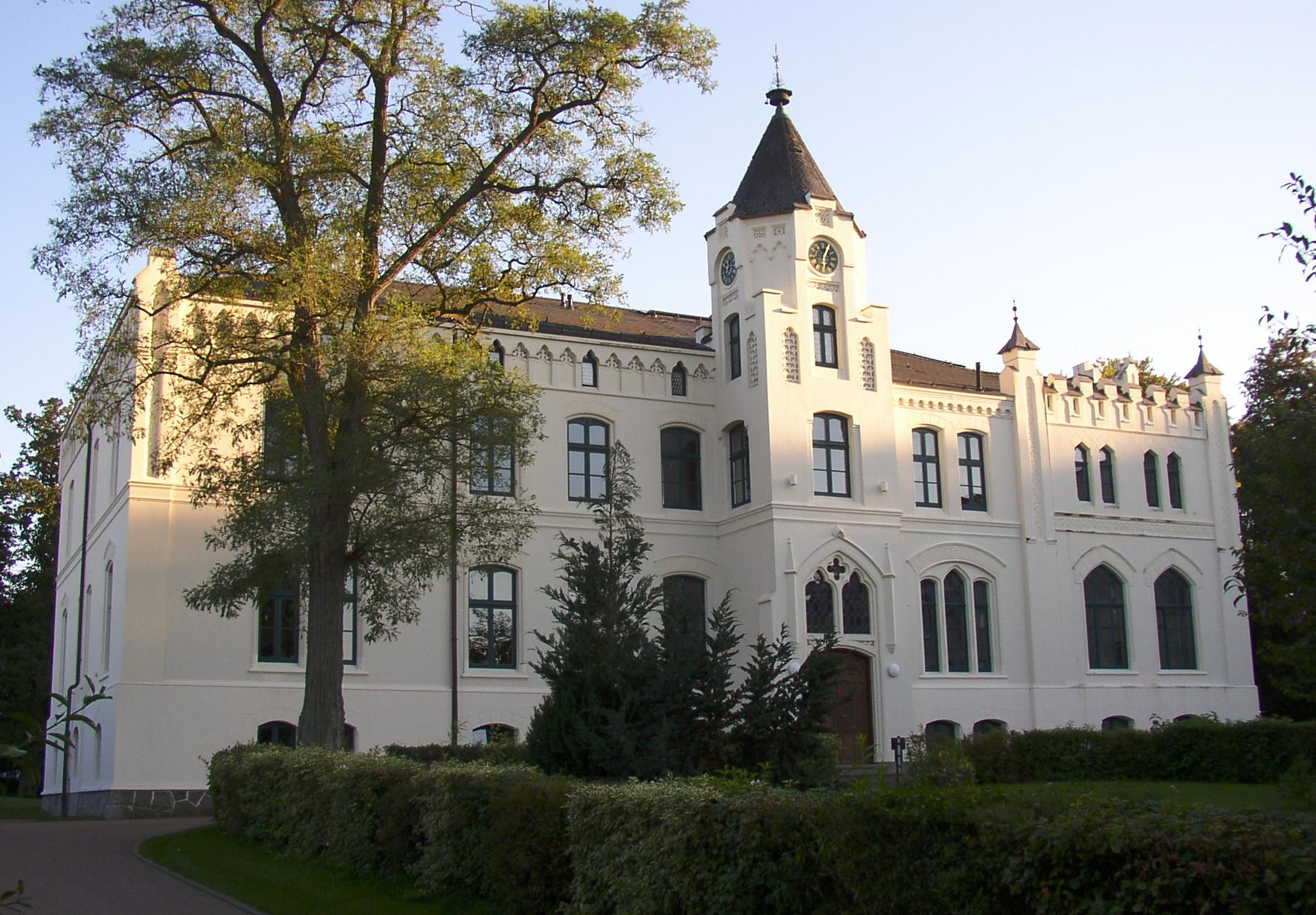
Manor in Viecheln

Behren-Lübchin is a municipality in the district of Rostock, in Mecklenburg-Vorpommern, Germany.

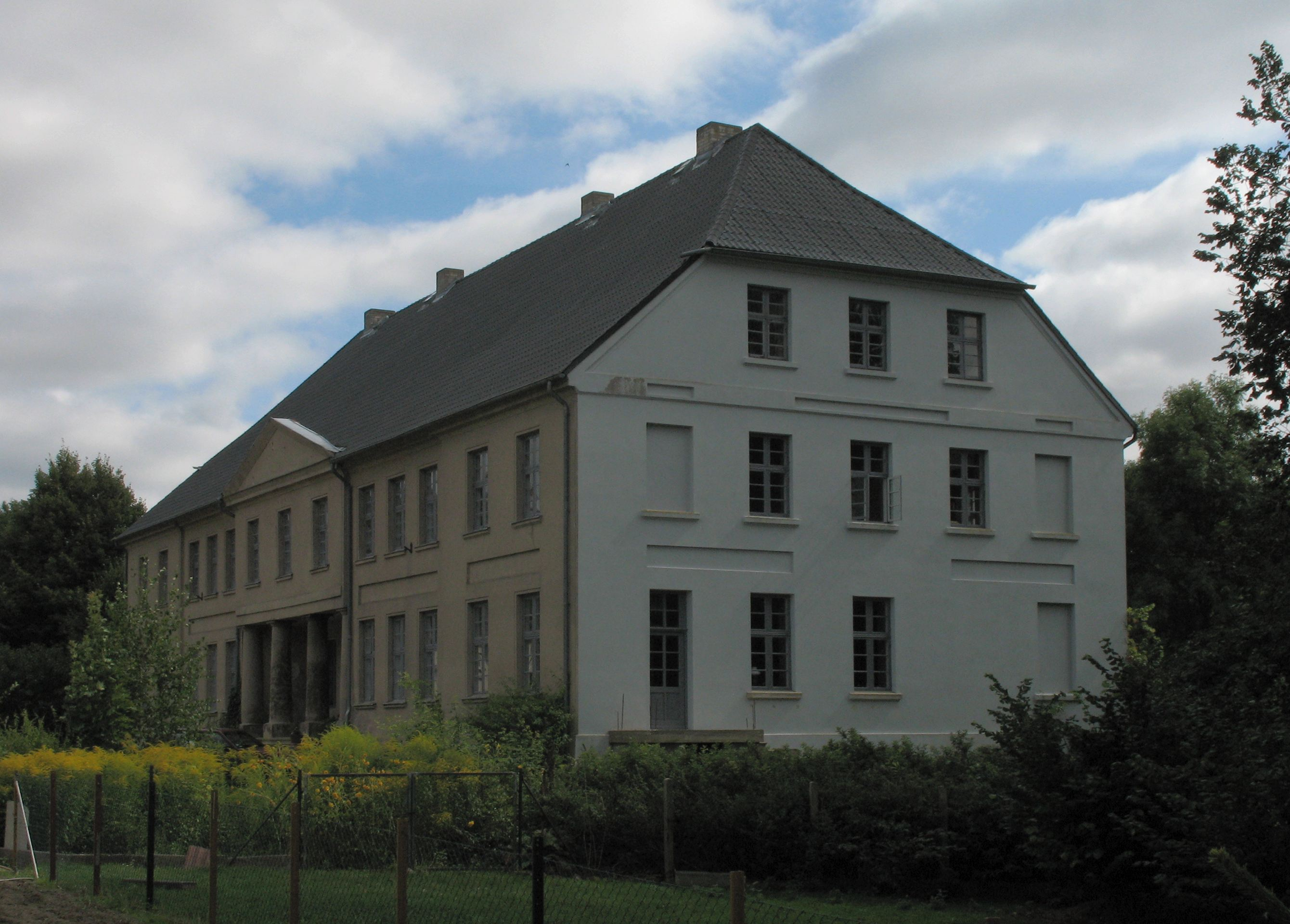
Manor in Bobbin

== Literature ==
- Schuldt E. Behren-Lübchin, Eine spät-slawische Burganlage in Mecklenburg. Berlin: Akademie Verlag, 1965. 157 s.
