= Schwasdorf =

- Municipality
- Location of Schwasdorf within Rostock district
- Interactive map of Schwasdorf
- Location within Germany Location within Mecklenburg-Vorpommern
- Coordinates: 53°53′24″N 12°37′59″E
- Country: Germany
- State: Mecklenburg-Vorpommern
- District: Rostock
- Municipal assoc.: Mecklenburgische Schweiz

Government
  - Mayor: Herbert Zingler

Area
  - Total: 24.33 km^{2} (9.39 sq mi)
- Elevation: 40 m (130 ft)

Population (2025-12-31)
  - Total: 425
  - Density: 17.5/km^{2} (45.2/sq mi)
- Time zone: UTC+01:00 (CET)
  - Summer (DST): UTC+02:00 (CEST)
- Postal codes: 17168
- Dialling codes: 039977
- Vehicle registration: LRO
- Website: www.amt-mecklenburgische-schweiz.de

Schwasdorf is a municipality in the Rostock district, in Mecklenburg-Vorpommern, Germany.

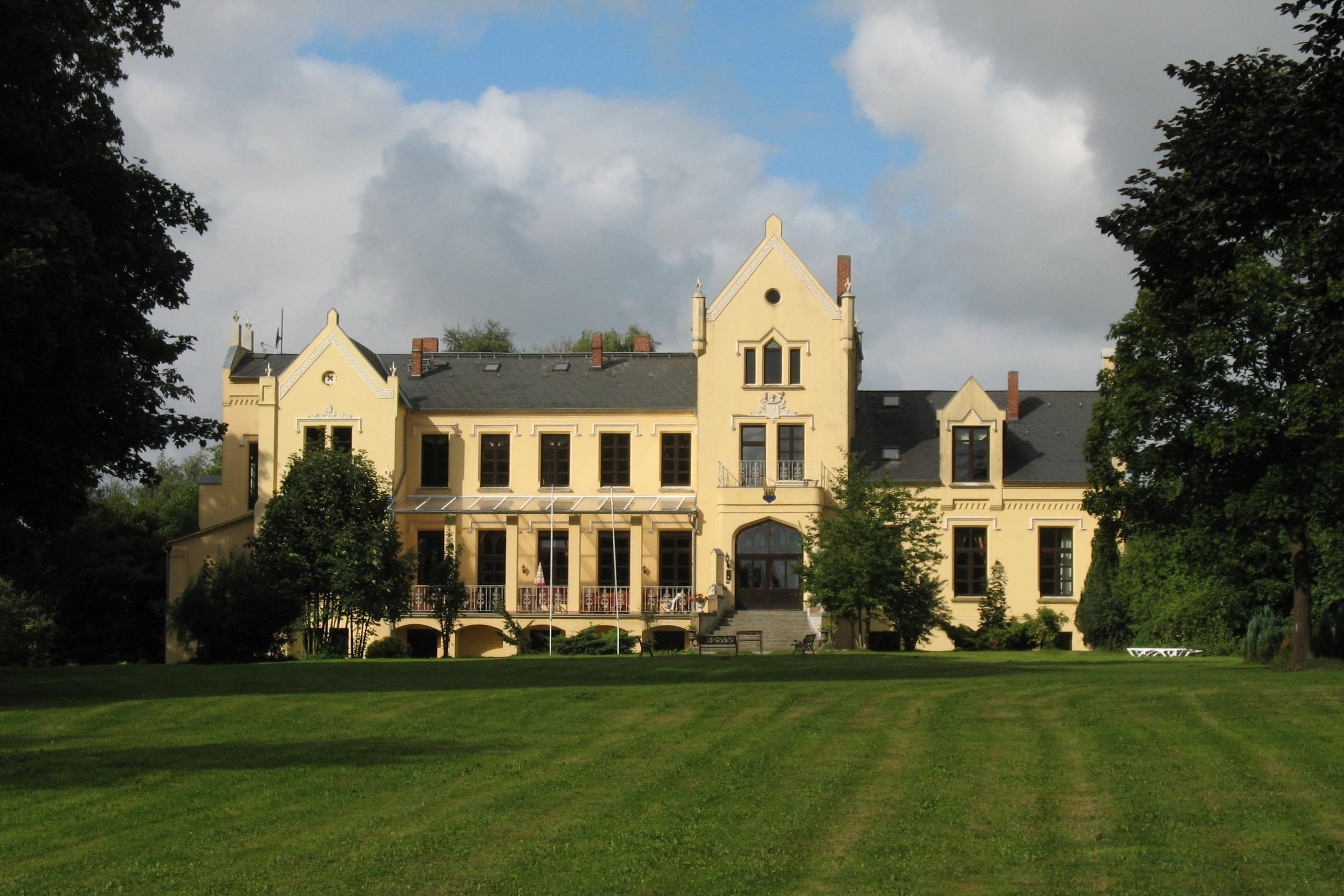
Manor house in Poggelow

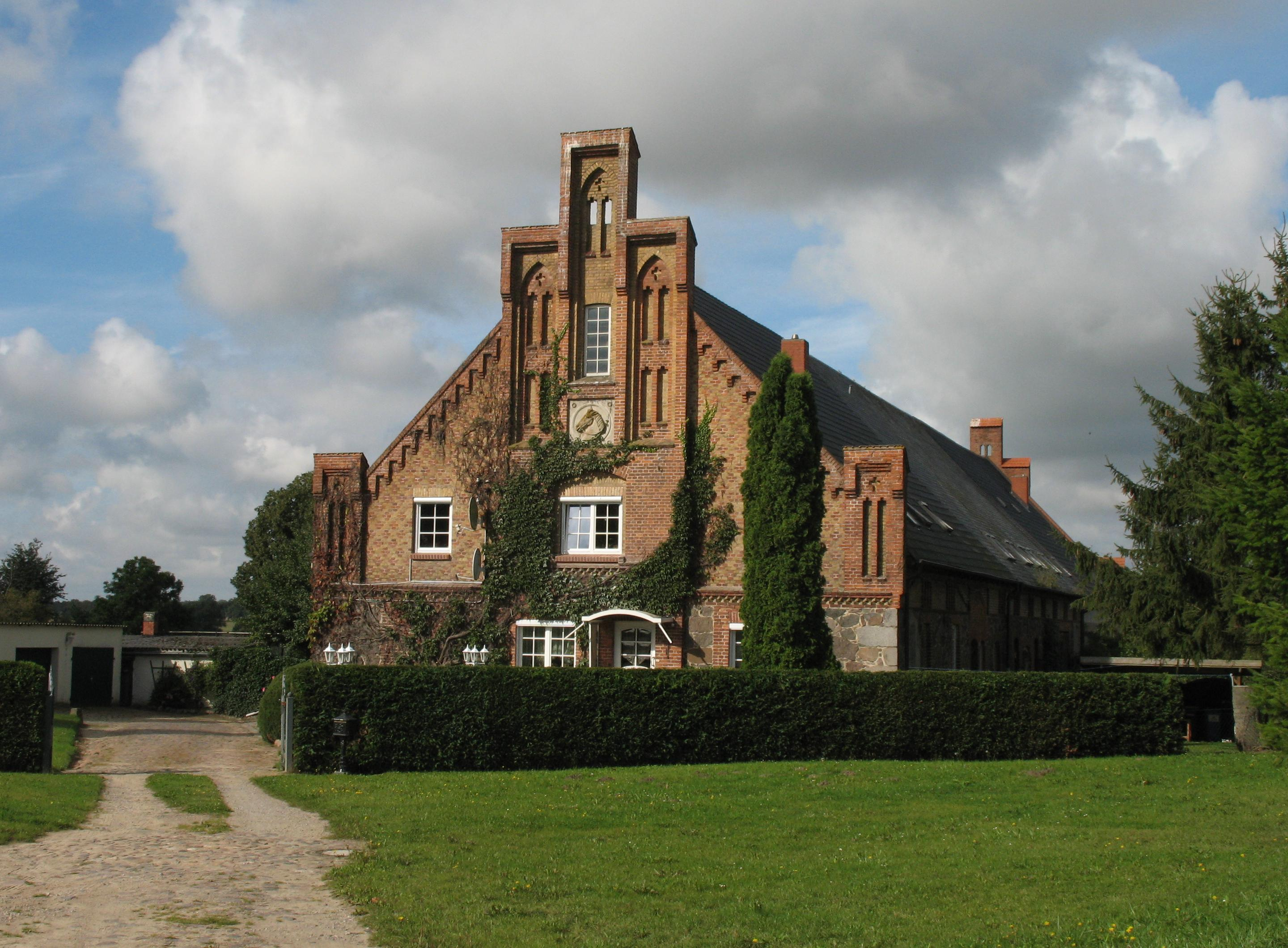
in Poggelow
