= Baumgarten, Germany =

Baumgarten
- Municipality
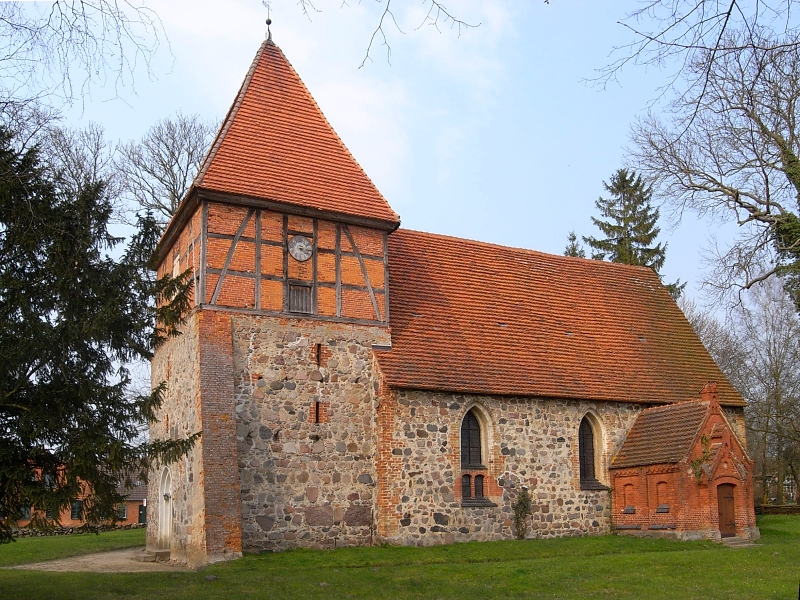
- Village church in Baumgarten

- Location of Baumgarten within Rostock district
- Interactive map of Baumgarten
- Location within Germany Location within Mecklenburg-Vorpommern
- Coordinates: 53°49′00″N 11°52′59″E
- Country: Germany
- State: Mecklenburg-Vorpommern
- District: Rostock
- Municipal assoc.: Bützow-Land

Government
  - Mayor: Armin Butz

Area
  - Total: 38.80 km^{2} (14.98 sq mi)
- Elevation: 24 m (79 ft)

Population (2025-12-31)
  - Total: 805
  - Density: 20.7/km^{2} (53.7/sq mi)
- Time zone: UTC+01:00 (CET)
  - Summer (DST): UTC+02:00 (CEST)
- Postal codes: 18246
- Dialling codes: 038462
- Vehicle registration: LRO
- Website: www.amt-buetzow-land.de

Baumgarten is a municipality in the Rostock district, in Mecklenburg-Vorpommern, Germany.
