= Reimershagen =

- Municipality
- Location of Reimershagen within Rostock district
- Interactive map of Reimershagen
- Location within Germany Location within Mecklenburg-Vorpommern
- Coordinates: 53°40′00″N 12°10′59″E
- Country: Germany
- State: Mecklenburg-Vorpommern
- District: Rostock
- Municipal assoc.: Güstrow-Land

Government
  - Mayor: Nico Ahlmann

Area
  - Total: 32.33 km^{2} (12.48 sq mi)
- Elevation: 70 m (230 ft)

Population (2025-12-31)
  - Total: 356
  - Density: 11.0/km^{2} (28.5/sq mi)
- Time zone: UTC+01:00 (CET)
  - Summer (DST): UTC+02:00 (CEST)
- Postal codes: 18276
- Dialling codes: 038457
- Vehicle registration: LRO
- Website: www.amt-guestrow-land.de

Reimershagen is a municipality in the Rostock district, in Mecklenburg-Vorpommern, Germany.
