= Rostock (district) =

Coordinates: 53°55′N 12°10′E

- District
- Flag Coat of arms
- Country: Germany
- State: Mecklenburg-Vorpommern
- Capital: Güstrow

Government
  - District admin.: Sebastian Constien (SPD)

Area
  - Total: 3,421 km^{2} (1,321 sq mi)

Population (31 December 2025)
  - Total: 218,123
  - Density: 63.76/km^{2} (165.1/sq mi)
- Time zone: UTC+01:00 (CET)
  - Summer (DST): UTC+02:00 (CEST)
- Vehicle registration: LRO, BÜZ, DBR, GÜ, ROS, TET
- Website: www.landkreis-rostock.de

Rostock (German: Landkreis Rostock) is a district in the north of Mecklenburg-Vorpommern, Germany. It is bounded by (from the west and clockwise) the district Nordwestmecklenburg, the Baltic Sea, the district-free city Rostock and the districts Vorpommern-Rügen, Mecklenburgische Seenplatte and Ludwigslust-Parchim. The district seat is the town Güstrow.

== History ==
Rostock District was established by merging the former districts of Bad Doberan and Güstrow as part of the local government reform of September 2011. The name of the district was decided by referendum on 4 September 2011. The project name for the district was Mittleres Mecklenburg.

== Geographic features ==
There are a number of lakes within the boundaries of Rostock district, including:

- Inselsee
- Hohen Sprenzer See
- Krakower See

== Towns and municipalities ==
Structure of the Rostock district

Amt-free towns
1. Bad Doberan
2. Güstrow
3. Kröpelin
4. Kühlungsborn
5. Neubukow
6. Teterow
Amt-free municipalities
1. Dummerstorf
2. Graal-Müritz
3. Sanitz
4. Satow

Ämter
1. Bad Doberan-Land; [seat: Bad Doberan]: 1. Admannshagen-Bargeshagen; 2. Bartenshagen-Parkentin; 3. Börgerende-Rethwisch; 4. Hohenfelde; 5. Nienhagen; 6. Reddelich; 7. Retschow; 8. Steffenshagen; 9. Wittenbeck; 2. Bützow-Land; 1. Baumgarten; 2. Bernitt; 3. Bützow^{1, 2}; 4. Dreetz; 5. Jürgenshagen; 6. Klein Belitz; 7. Penzin; 8. Rühn; 9. Steinhagen; 10. Tarnow; 11. Warnow; 12. Zepelin; 3. Carbäk; 1. Broderstorf^{1}; 2. Poppendorf; 3. Roggentin; 4. Thulendorf	4. Gnoien; 1. Altkalen; 2. Behren-Lübchin; 3. Finkenthal; 4. Gnoien^{1, 2}; 5. Walkendorf; 5. Güstrow-Land; (seat: Güstrow): 1. Glasewitz; 2. Groß Schwiesow; 3. Gülzow-Prüzen; 4. Gutow; 5. Klein Upahl; 6. Kuhs; 7. Lohmen; 8. Lüssow; 9. Mistorf; 10. Mühl Rosin; 11. Plaaz; 12. Reimershagen; 13. Sarmstorf; 14. Zehna; 6. Krakow am See; 1. Dobbin-Linstow; 2. Hoppenrade; 3. Krakow am See^{1, 2}; 4. Kuchelmiß; 5. Lalendorf	7. Laage; 1. Dolgen am See; 2. Hohen Sprenz; 3. Laage^{1, 2}; 4. Wardow; 8. Mecklenburgische Schweiz; (seat: Teterow): 1. Alt Sührkow; 2. Dahmen; 3. Dalkendorf; 4. Groß Roge; 5. Groß Wokern; 6. Groß Wüstenfelde; 7. Hohen Demzin; 8. Jördenstorf; 9. Lelkendorf; 10. Prebberede; 11. Schorssow; 12. Schwasdorf; 13. Sukow-Levitzow; 14. Thürkow; 15. Warnkenhagen; 9. Neubukow-Salzhaff; [seat: Neubukow]: 1. Alt Bukow; 2. Am Salzhaff; 3. Bastorf; 4. Biendorf; 5. Carinerland; 6. Rerik^{2}	10. Rostocker Heide; 1. Bentwisch; 2. Blankenhagen; 3. Gelbensande^{1}; 4. Mönchhagen; 5. Rövershagen; 11. Schwaan; 1. Benitz; 2. Bröbberow; 3. Kassow; 4. Rukieten; 5. Schwaan^{1, 2}; 6. Vorbeck; 7. Wiendorf; 12. Tessin; 1. Cammin; 2. Gnewitz; 3. Grammow; 4. Nustrow; 5. Selpin; 6. Stubbendorf; 7. Tessin^{1, 2}; 8. Thelkow; 9. Zarnewanz; 13. Warnow-West; 1. Elmenhorst/Lichtenhagen; 2. Kritzmow^{1}; 3. Lambrechtshagen; 4. Papendorf; 5. Pölchow; 6. Stäbelow; 7. Ziesendorf
^{1} - seat of the Amt; ^{2} - town
