= Sarmstorf =

- Municipality
- Location of Sarmstorf within Rostock district
- Interactive map of Sarmstorf
- Location within Germany Location within Mecklenburg-Vorpommern
- Coordinates: 53°51′00″N 12°11′59″E
- Country: Germany
- State: Mecklenburg-Vorpommern
- District: Rostock
- Municipal assoc.: Güstrow-Land

Government
  - Mayor: Marita Breitenfeldt

Area
  - Total: 10.84 km^{2} (4.19 sq mi)
- Elevation: 31 m (102 ft)

Population (2025-12-31)
  - Total: 499
  - Density: 46.0/km^{2} (119/sq mi)
- Time zone: UTC+01:00 (CET)
  - Summer (DST): UTC+02:00 (CEST)
- Postal codes: 18276
- Dialling codes: 03843
- Vehicle registration: LRO
- Website: www.amt-guestrow-land.de

Sarmstorf is a municipality in the Rostock district, in Mecklenburg-Vorpommern, Germany.
