= Klein Belitz =

- Municipality
- Location of Klein Belitz within Rostock district
- Interactive map of Klein Belitz
- Location within Germany Location within Mecklenburg-Vorpommern
- Coordinates: 53°55′59″N 11°58′00″E
- Country: Germany
- State: Mecklenburg-Vorpommern
- District: Rostock
- Municipal assoc.: Bützow-Land

Government
  - Mayor: Ingrid Pleines

Area
  - Total: 38.87 km^{2} (15.01 sq mi)
- Elevation: 11 m (36 ft)

Population (2025-12-31)
  - Total: 818
  - Density: 21.0/km^{2} (54.5/sq mi)
- Time zone: UTC+01:00 (CET)
  - Summer (DST): UTC+02:00 (CEST)
- Postal codes: 18246
- Dialling codes: 038466
- Vehicle registration: LRO
- Website: www.amt-buetzow-land.de

Klein Belitz is a municipality in the Rostock district, in Mecklenburg-Vorpommern, Germany.

== Sons and daughters ==
- Carl Freiherr von Langen (1887–1994), German equestrian
