= Mistorf =

- Municipality
- Location of Mistorf within Rostock district
- Interactive map of Mistorf
- Location within Germany Location within Mecklenburg-Vorpommern
- Coordinates: 53°52′59″N 12°09′00″E
- Country: Germany
- State: Mecklenburg-Vorpommern
- District: Rostock
- Municipal assoc.: Güstrow-Land

Government
  - Mayor: Hans-Georg Hinrichs

Area
  - Total: 25.35 km^{2} (9.79 sq mi)
- Elevation: 25 m (82 ft)

Population (2025-12-31)
  - Total: 612
  - Density: 24.1/km^{2} (62.5/sq mi)
- Time zone: UTC+01:00 (CET)
  - Summer (DST): UTC+02:00 (CEST)
- Postal codes: 18276
- Dialling codes: 038453
- Vehicle registration: LRO
- Website: www.amt-guestrow-land.de

Mistorf is a municipality in the Rostock district, in Mecklenburg-Vorpommern, Germany.
