= Mühl Rosin =

- Municipality
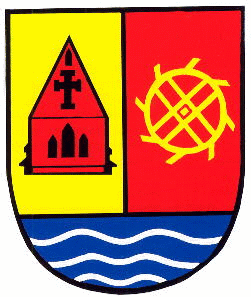
- Coat of arms

- Location of Mühl Rosin within Rostock district
- Interactive map of Mühl Rosin
- Location within Germany Location within Mecklenburg-Vorpommern
- Coordinates: 53°46′00″N 12°13′00″E
- Country: Germany
- State: Mecklenburg-Vorpommern
- District: Rostock
- Municipal assoc.: Güstrow-Land

Government
  - Mayor: Eckhard Buchholz

Area
  - Total: 24.29 km^{2} (9.38 sq mi)
- Elevation: 12 m (39 ft)

Population (2025-12-31)
  - Total: 1,098
  - Density: 45.20/km^{2} (117.1/sq mi)
- Time zone: UTC+01:00 (CET)
  - Summer (DST): UTC+02:00 (CEST)
- Postal codes: 18276
- Dialling codes: 03843
- Vehicle registration: LRO
- Website: www.muehlrosin.de

Mühl Rosin is a municipality in the Rostock district, in Mecklenburg-Vorpommern, Germany.
