= Tarnow, Germany =

Tarnow
- Municipality
- Location of Tarnow within Rostock district
- Interactive map of Tarnow
- Location within Germany Location within Mecklenburg-Vorpommern
- Coordinates: 53°46′59″N 12°01′00″E
- Country: Germany
- State: Mecklenburg-Vorpommern
- District: Rostock
- Municipal assoc.: Bützow-Land

Government
  - Mayor: Bärbel Kozian

Area
  - Total: 40.49 km^{2} (15.63 sq mi)
- Elevation: 20 m (66 ft)

Population (2025-12-31)
  - Total: 1,066
  - Density: 26.33/km^{2} (68.19/sq mi)
- Time zone: UTC+01:00 (CET)
  - Summer (DST): UTC+02:00 (CEST)
- Postal codes: 18249
- Dialling codes: 038450
- Vehicle registration: LRO
- Website: www.amt-buetzow-land.de

Tarnow is a municipality in the Rostock district, in Mecklenburg-Vorpommern, Germany.
