= Finkenthal =

- Municipality
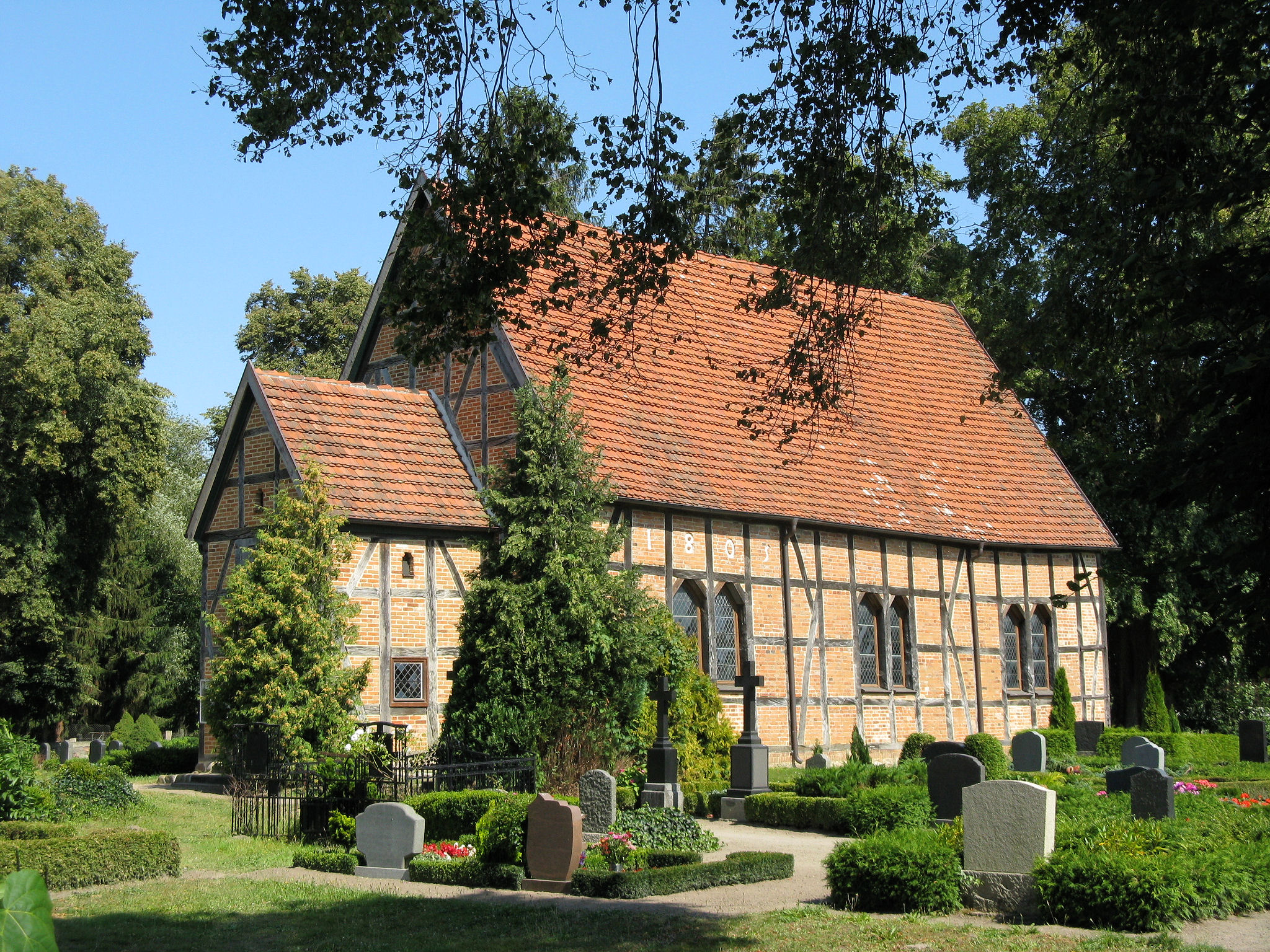
- Village church in Finkenthal

- Location of Finkenthal within Rostock district
- Interactive map of Finkenthal
- Location within Germany Location within Mecklenburg-Vorpommern
- Coordinates: 53°57′N 12°46′E
- Country: Germany
- State: Mecklenburg-Vorpommern
- District: Rostock
- Municipal assoc.: Gnoien

Government
  - Mayor: Friedel Todzy

Area
  - Total: 20.24 km^{2} (7.81 sq mi)
- Elevation: 20 m (66 ft)

Population (2025-12-31)
  - Total: 318
  - Density: 15.7/km^{2} (40.7/sq mi)
- Time zone: UTC+01:00 (CET)
  - Summer (DST): UTC+02:00 (CEST)
- Postal codes: 17179
- Dialling codes: 039971
- Vehicle registration: LRO
- Website: www.amt-gnoien.de

Finkenthal is a municipality in the Rostock district, in Mecklenburg-Vorpommern, Germany.
