= Klein Upahl =

- Municipality
- Location of Klein Upahl within Rostock district
- Interactive map of Klein Upahl
- Location within Germany Location within Mecklenburg-Vorpommern
- Coordinates: 53°43′N 12°04′E
- Country: Germany
- State: Mecklenburg-Vorpommern
- District: Rostock
- Municipal assoc.: Güstrow-Land

Government
  - Mayor: Hans-Uwe Tessenow

Area
  - Total: 7.91 km^{2} (3.05 sq mi)
- Elevation: 78 m (256 ft)

Population (2025-12-31)
  - Total: 225
  - Density: 28.4/km^{2} (73.7/sq mi)
- Time zone: UTC+01:00 (CET)
  - Summer (DST): UTC+02:00 (CEST)
- Postal codes: 18276
- Dialling codes: 038458
- Vehicle registration: LRO
- Website: www.amt-guestrow-land.de

Klein Upahl is a municipality in the Rostock district, in Mecklenburg-Vorpommern, Germany.
