= Kuchelmiß =

- Municipality
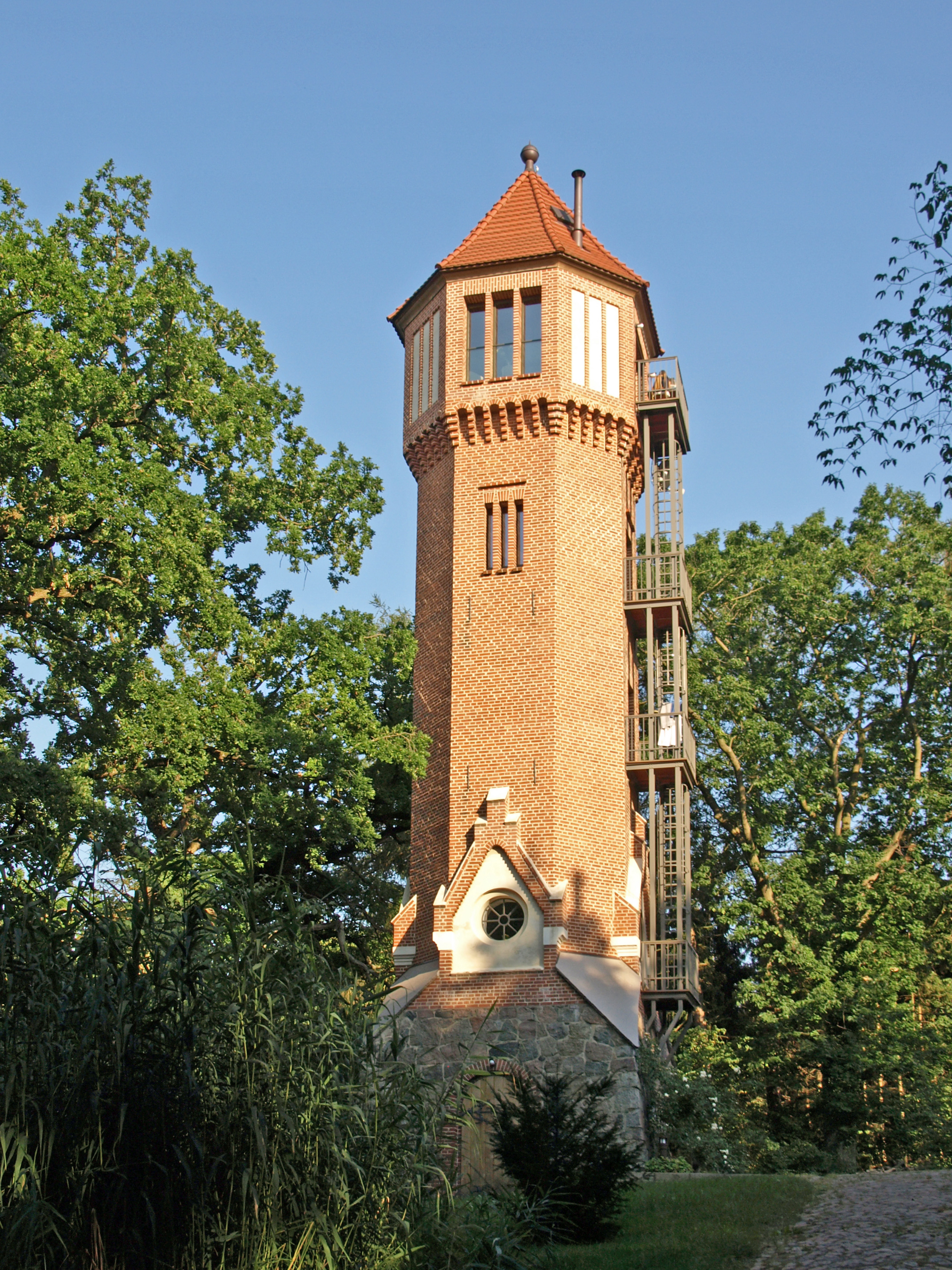
- Water tower Kuchelmiß

- Location of Kuchelmiß within Rostock district
- Interactive map of Kuchelmiß
- Location within Germany Location within Mecklenburg-Vorpommern
- Coordinates: 53°40′59″N 12°22′00″E
- Country: Germany
- State: Mecklenburg-Vorpommern
- District: Rostock
- Municipal assoc.: Krakow am See

Government
  - Mayor: Peter Hildebrandt

Area
  - Total: 37.46 km^{2} (14.46 sq mi)
- Elevation: 57 m (187 ft)

Population (2025-12-31)
  - Total: 668
  - Density: 17.8/km^{2} (46.2/sq mi)
- Time zone: UTC+01:00 (CET)
  - Summer (DST): UTC+02:00 (CEST)
- Postal codes: 18292
- Dialling codes: 038456
- Vehicle registration: LRO
- Website: www.amt-krakow-am-see.de

Kuchelmiß is a municipality in the Rostock district, in Mecklenburg-Vorpommern, Germany.

== Notable people ==
- Uwe Holmer
