= Dobbin-Linstow =

- Municipality
- Location of Dobbin-Linstow within Rostock district
- Interactive map of Dobbin-Linstow
- Location within Germany Location within Mecklenburg-Vorpommern
- Coordinates: 53°37′00″N 12°21′29″E
- Country: Germany
- State: Mecklenburg-Vorpommern
- District: Rostock
- Municipal assoc.: Krakow am See

Government
  - Mayor: Wilfried Baldermann (CDU)

Area
  - Total: 65.41 km^{2} (25.25 sq mi)
- Elevation: 60 m (200 ft)

Population (2025-12-31)
  - Total: 491
  - Density: 7.51/km^{2} (19.4/sq mi)
- Time zone: UTC+01:00 (CET)
  - Summer (DST): UTC+02:00 (CEST)
- Postal codes: 18292
- Dialling codes: 038457
- Vehicle registration: LRO
- Website: www.amt-krakow-am-see.de

Dobbin-Linstow is a municipality in the Rostock district, in Mecklenburg-Vorpommern, Germany.
