= Prebberede =

- Municipality
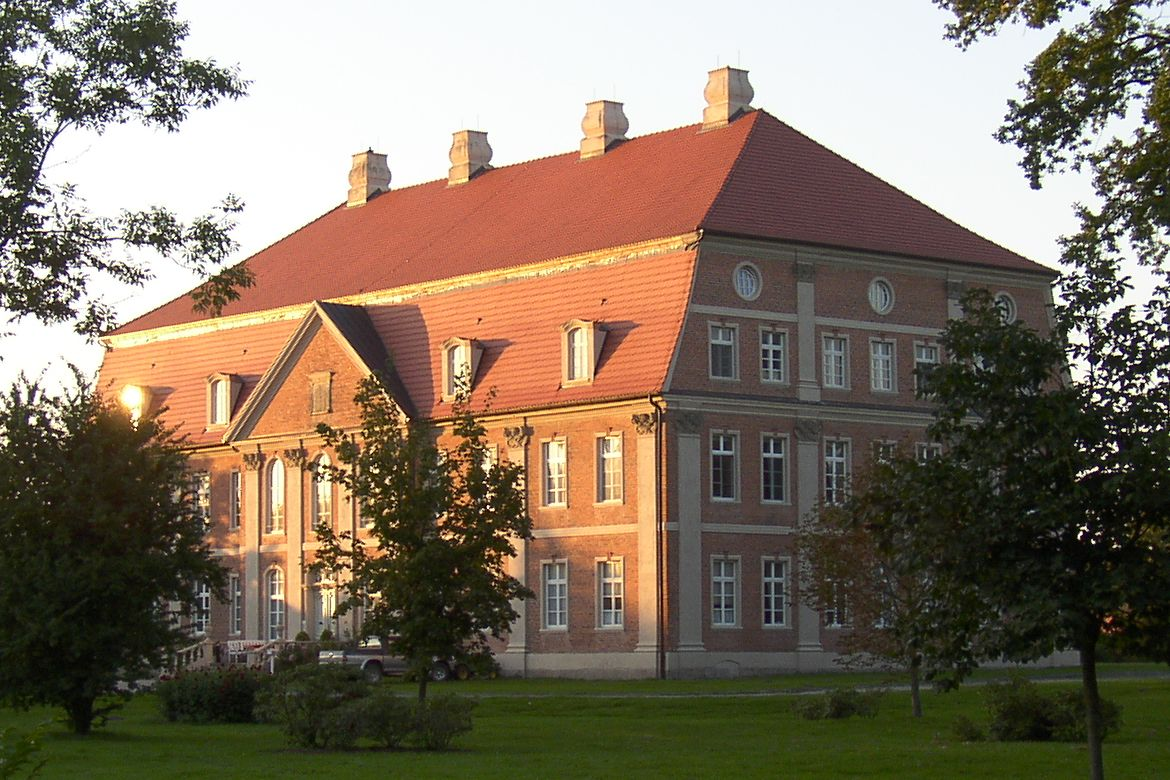
- Palace

- Location of Prebberede within Rostock district
- Interactive map of Prebberede
- Location within Germany Location within Mecklenburg-Vorpommern
- Coordinates: 53°55′00″N 12°28′59″E
- Country: Germany
- State: Mecklenburg-Vorpommern
- District: Rostock
- Municipal assoc.: Mecklenburgische Schweiz

Government
  - Mayor: Frank Möller

Area
  - Total: 42.84 km^{2} (16.54 sq mi)
- Elevation: 46 m (151 ft)

Population (2025-12-31)
  - Total: 735
  - Density: 17.2/km^{2} (44.4/sq mi)
- Time zone: UTC+01:00 (CET)
  - Summer (DST): UTC+02:00 (CEST)
- Postal codes: 17168
- Dialling codes: 039976
- Vehicle registration: LRO
- Website: www.amt-mecklenburgische-schweiz.de

Prebberede is a municipality in the Rostock district, in Mecklenburg-Vorpommern, Germany.
