= Hohen Sprenz =

- Municipality
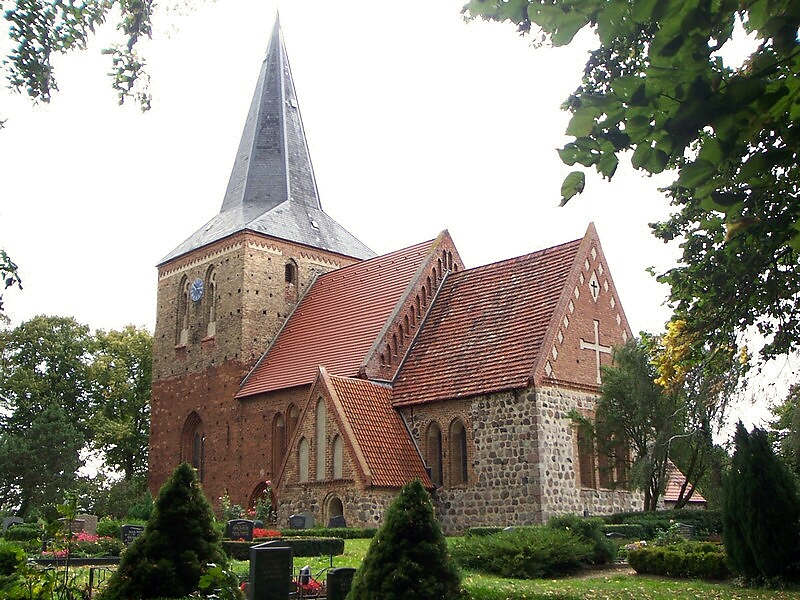
- Medieval village church in Hohen Sprenz

- Flag Coat of arms

- Location of Hohen Sprenz within Rostock district
- Interactive map of Hohen Sprenz
- Location within Germany Location within Mecklenburg-Vorpommern
- Coordinates: 53°55′00″N 12°11′34″E
- Country: Germany
- State: Mecklenburg-Vorpommern
- District: Rostock
- Municipal assoc.: Laage

Government
  - Mayor: Angelika Exler

Area
  - Total: 22.43 km^{2} (8.66 sq mi)
- Elevation: 22 m (72 ft)

Population (2025-12-31)
  - Total: 495
  - Density: 22.1/km^{2} (57.2/sq mi)
- Time zone: UTC+01:00 (CET)
  - Summer (DST): UTC+02:00 (CEST)
- Postal codes: 18299
- Dialling codes: 038454
- Vehicle registration: LRO
- Website: www.amt-laage.de

Hohen Sprenz is a municipality in the Rostock district, in Mecklenburg-Vorpommern, Germany.
