= Groß Wüstenfelde =

- Municipality
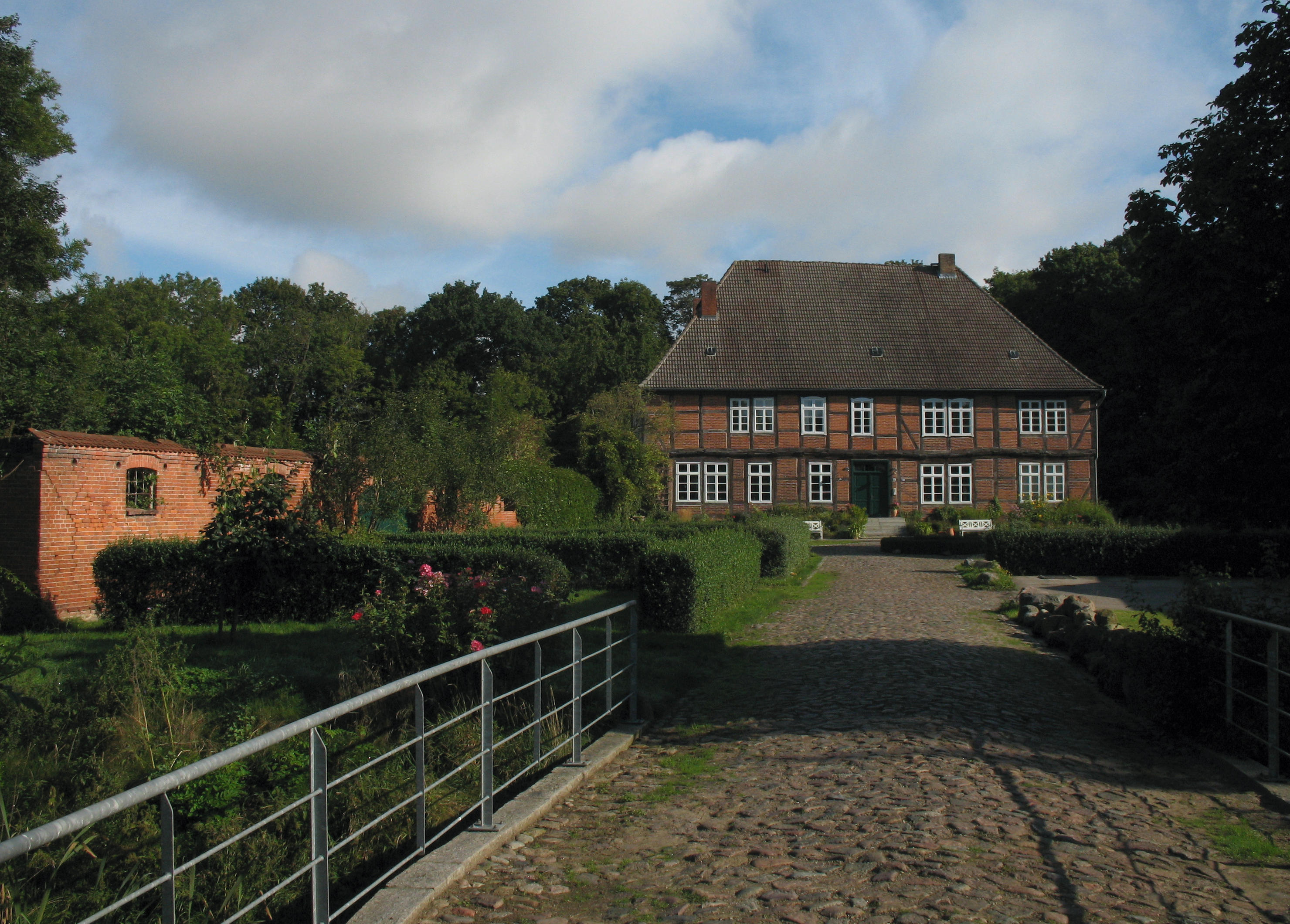
- Manor

- Location of Groß Wüstenfelde within Rostock district
- Interactive map of Groß Wüstenfelde
- Location within Germany Location within Mecklenburg-Vorpommern
- Coordinates: 53°52′38″N 12°33′00″E
- Country: Germany
- State: Mecklenburg-Vorpommern
- District: Rostock
- Municipal assoc.: Mecklenburgische Schweiz

Government
  - Mayor: Katharina Skorsetz

Area
  - Total: 26.61 km^{2} (10.27 sq mi)
- Elevation: 37 m (121 ft)

Population (2025-12-31)
  - Total: 769
  - Density: 28.9/km^{2} (74.8/sq mi)
- Time zone: UTC+01:00 (CET)
  - Summer (DST): UTC+02:00 (CEST)
- Postal codes: 17168
- Dialling codes: 039977
- Vehicle registration: LRO
- Website: www.amt-mecklenburgische-schweiz.de

Groß Wüstenfelde is a municipality in the Rostock district, in Mecklenburg-Vorpommern, Germany.
