= Wardow =

- Municipality
- Location of Wardow within Rostock district
- Interactive map of Wardow
- Location within Germany Location within Mecklenburg-Vorpommern
- Coordinates: 53°55′59″N 12°25′00″E
- Country: Germany
- State: Mecklenburg-Vorpommern
- District: Rostock
- Municipal assoc.: Laage

Government
  - Mayor: Klaus Fröhling

Area
  - Total: 68.85 km^{2} (26.58 sq mi)
- Elevation: 39 m (128 ft)

Population (2025-12-31)
  - Total: 1,332
  - Density: 19.35/km^{2} (50.11/sq mi)
- Time zone: UTC+01:00 (CET)
  - Summer (DST): UTC+02:00 (CEST)
- Postal codes: 18299
- Dialling codes: 038459
- Vehicle registration: LRO
- Website: www.amt-laage.de

Wardow is a municipality in the Rostock district, in Mecklenburg-Vorpommern, Germany.
