= Lüssow, Güstrow =

Municipality in Germany

Lüssow
- Municipality
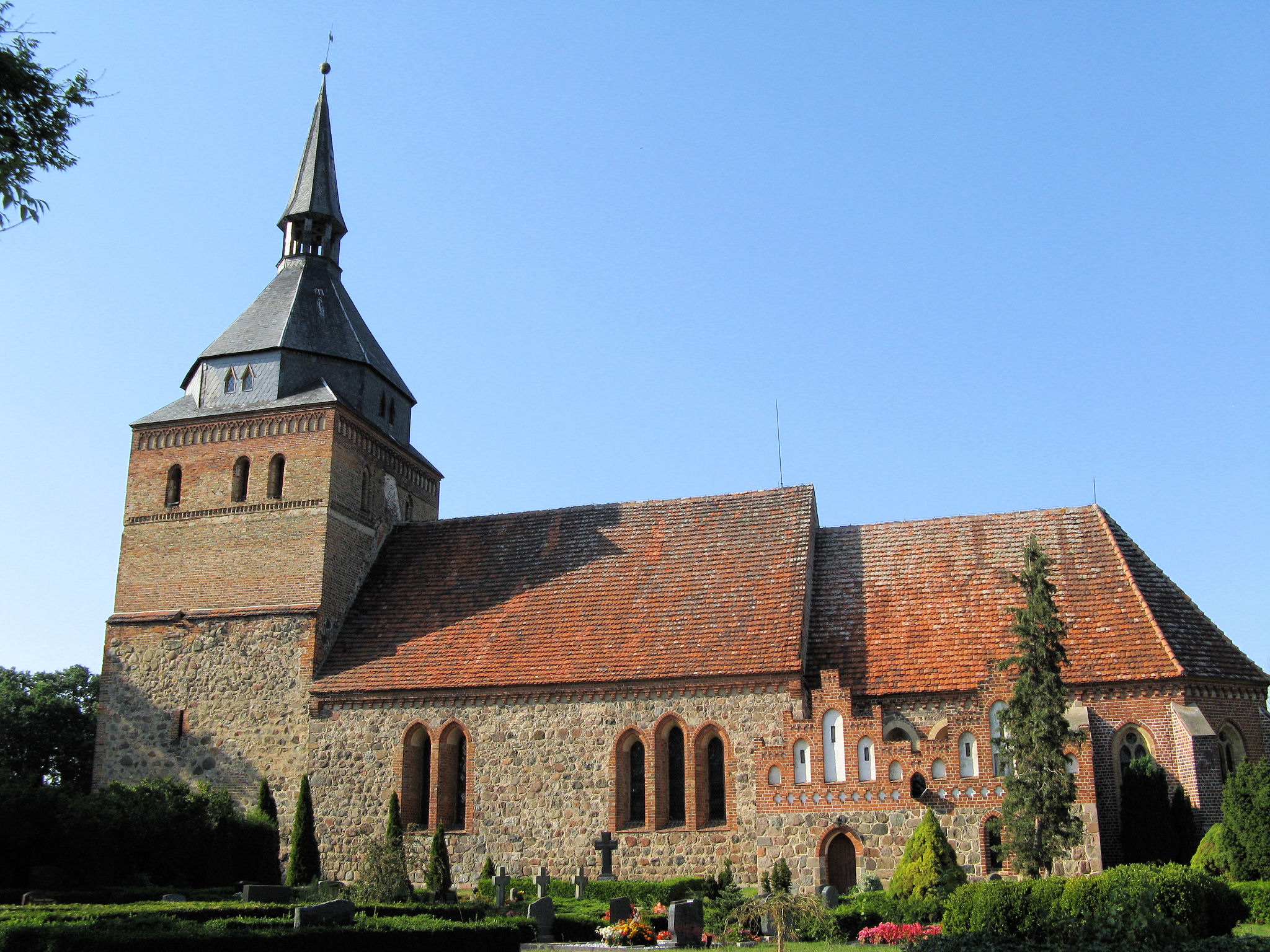
- Medieval village church in Lüssow

- Location of Lüssow within Rostock district
- Interactive map of Lüssow
- Location within Germany Location within Mecklenburg-Vorpommern
- Coordinates: 53°49′59″N 12°09′00″E
- Country: Germany
- State: Mecklenburg-Vorpommern
- District: Rostock
- Municipal assoc.: Güstrow-Land

Government
  - Mayor: Rainer Golombek

Area
  - Total: 15.77 km^{2} (6.09 sq mi)
- Elevation: 8 m (26 ft)

Population (2025-12-31)
  - Total: 979
  - Density: 62.1/km^{2} (161/sq mi)
- Time zone: UTC+01:00 (CET)
  - Summer (DST): UTC+02:00 (CEST)
- Postal codes: 18276
- Dialling codes: 03843
- Vehicle registration: LRO
- Website: www.amt-guestrow-land.de

Lüssow is a municipality in the Rostock district, in Mecklenburg-Vorpommern, Germany.
