= Gülzow-Prüzen =

- Municipality
- Coat of arms

- Location of Gülzow-Prüzen within Rostock district
- Interactive map of Gülzow-Prüzen
- Location within Germany Location within Mecklenburg-Vorpommern
- Coordinates: 53°46′59″N 12°03′05″E
- Country: Germany
- State: Mecklenburg-Vorpommern
- District: Rostock
- Municipal assoc.: Güstrow-Land

Government
  - Mayor: Karl-Heinz Kissmann

Area
  - Total: 58.18 km^{2} (22.46 sq mi)
- Elevation: 10 m (33 ft)

Population (2025-12-31)
  - Total: 1,479
  - Density: 25.42/km^{2} (65.84/sq mi)
- Time zone: UTC+01:00 (CET)
  - Summer (DST): UTC+02:00 (CEST)
- Postal codes: 18276
- Dialling codes: 038450, 03843
- Vehicle registration: LRO
- Website: www.amt-guestrow-land.de

Gülzow-Prüzen is a municipality in the Rostock district, in Mecklenburg-Vorpommern, Germany.
