= Bad Doberan (district) =

Defunct subdivision, Mecklenburg-Vorpommern, Germany

Coordinates: 54°00′N 12°00′E

- District
- Flag Coat of arms

- Country: Germany
- State: Mecklenburg-Western Pomerania
- Disbanded: 2011
- Capital: Bad Doberan

Area
  - Total: 1,362 km^{2} (526 sq mi)

Population (2010-12-31)
  - Total: 117,197
  - Density: 86/km^{2} (220/sq mi)
- Time zone: UTC+01:00 (CET)
  - Summer (DST): UTC+02:00 (CEST)
- Vehicle registration: DBR
- Website: lk-dbr.de

Bad Doberan (German pronunciation: [baːt dobəˈʁaːn]) is a former district in Mecklenburg-Vorpommern, Germany. It was named after its largest town, Bad Doberan, the German Bad meaning 'spa'. The district surrounded the city of Rostock, bordering the Baltic Sea in the north as well as the former original districts of Nordvorpommern, Güstrow and Nordwestmecklenburg. The district was disbanded at the district reform of September 2011. Its territory has been part of the district of Rostock since.

== History ==
Before 500 CE, East Germanic tribes dominated the area, who later on emigrated to the west. The then very rural region was thereafter scarcely populated by Slavic peoples until the 12th century. Remains of a Slavic castle can be found in the town of Rerik (which still bears a Slavic name). In 1160 Henry the Lion conquered the region; afterwards German monks, peasants and traders arrived to settle here. In the Middle Ages the region profited from the vicinity of the wealthy Hanseatic city of Rostock. The worst time in regional history was the Thirty Years' War, which depopulated the area almost completely.

In 1793 the bathing resort of Heiligendamm (today a borough of Bad Doberan) was established, and the region became a summer residence for the dukes of Mecklenburg-Schwerin.

In 1952 the districts of Bad Doberan and Rostock-Land were established. They were merged in 1994 to form the enlarged district of Bad Doberan. This district was merged with the district of Güstrow at the district reform of September 2011, forming the new district of Rostock.

== Geography ==
The district comprised a 62-kilometre (39 mi) coastline along the Baltic Sea and its hinterland on both banks of the Warnow river. The Warnow enters the district in the south and leaves for the city of Rostock. Rostock was surrounded by the district, but not part of it.

== Coat of arms ==
Coat of arms

The coat of arms displays:
- the griffin from the arms of Rostock, symbolising the city's influence on the district
- the bull from the arms of the former duchy of Mecklenburg
- the clerical staff stands for the old and famous Cistercian monastery of Bad Doberan

== Towns and municipalities ==
The subdivisions of the district were (situation August 2011):

Amt-free towns
1. Bad Doberan
2. Kröpelin
3. Kühlungsborn
4. Neubukow
Amt-free municipalities
1. Dummerstorf
2. Graal-Müritz
3. Sanitz
4. Satow

Ämter
1. Bad Doberan-Land [seat: Bad Doberan]; 1. Admannshagen-Bargeshagen; 2. Bartenshagen-Parkentin; 3. Börgerende-Rethwisch; 4. Hohenfelde; 5. Nienhagen; 6. Reddelich; 7. Retschow; 8. Steffenshagen; 9. Wittenbeck; 2. Carbäk; 1. Broderstorf^{1}; 2. Klein Kussewitz; 3. Mandelshagen^{3}; 4. Poppendorf; 5. Roggentin; 6. Steinfeld^{3}; 7. Thulendorf	3. Neubukow-Salzhaff [seat: Neubukow]; 1. Alt Bukow; 2. Am Salzhaff; 3. Bastorf; 4. Biendorf; 5. Carinerland; 6. Kirch Mulsow; 7. Rerik^{2}; 4. Rostocker Heide; 1. Bentwisch; 2. Blankenhagen; 3. Gelbensande^{1}; 4. Mönchhagen; 5. Rövershagen; 5. Schwaan; 1. Benitz; 2. Bröbberow; 3. Kassow; 4. Rukieten; 5. Schwaan^{1, 2}; 6. Vorbeck; 7. Wiendorf	6. Tessin; 1. Cammin; 2. Gnewitz; 3. Grammow; 4. Nustrow; 5. Selpin; 6. Stubbendorf; 7. Tessin^{1, 2}; 8. Thelkow; 9. Zarnewanz; 7. Warnow-West; 1. Elmenhorst/Lichtenhagen; 2. Kritzmow^{1}; 3. Lambrechtshagen; 4. Papendorf; 5. Pölchow; 6. Stäbelow; 7. Ziesendorf
^{1} - seat of the Amt; ^{2} - town; ^{3} - former town/municipality
