= Baltic Sea watchtower =

Baltic Sea watchtower refers to the former border watchtowers on the German Baltic Sea coast. In particular it may refer to the two surviving towers:

- Baltic Sea watchtower, Börgerende, in the village of Börgerende, Mecklenburg-Western Pomerania
- Baltic Sea watchtower, Kühlungsborn, in the village of Kühlungsborn, Mecklenburg-Western Pomerania
