= Bartenshagen-Parkentin =

- Municipality
- Location of Bartenshagen-Parkentin within Rostock district
- Interactive map of Bartenshagen-Parkentin
- Location within Germany Location within Mecklenburg-Vorpommern
- Coordinates: 54°5′N 11°59′E
- Country: Germany
- State: Mecklenburg-Vorpommern
- District: Rostock
- Municipal assoc.: Bad Doberan-Land

Government
  - Mayor: Gabriele Kalweit

Area
  - Total: 15.20 km^{2} (5.87 sq mi)
- Elevation: 22 m (72 ft)

Population (2025-12-31)
  - Total: 1,302
  - Density: 85.66/km^{2} (221.9/sq mi)
- Time zone: UTC+01:00 (CET)
  - Summer (DST): UTC+02:00 (CEST)
- Postal codes: 18209
- Dialling codes: 038203
- Vehicle registration: LRO
- Website: www.doberan-land.de

Bartenshagen-Parkentin is a municipality in the Rostock district, in Mecklenburg-Vorpommern, Germany.

== Geography ==
The municipality comprises the villages of Bartenshagen, Parkentin, Huetten, Neuhof and Bollbruecke.

Bartenshagen-Parkentin lies between Bad Doberan and the Hanseatic city of Rostock. The municipality has two parts: Bartenshagen lies on the slightly raised area of basal moraine of Haegerort approximately 7 km from the Baltic See. Parkentin lies approximately 3 km south from the centre of Bartenshagen. The municipality is characterised by farmland, predominantly used for arable farming. South of Parkentin near Neuhof and north of Bollbruecke there are some areas of meadowland. The southwest of the municipality is dominated by the Huetter Wohld, containing many artificial fish-ponds, of which approx. 180 Hectares lie within the municipality. The highest point of the municipality (80m above mean sea level) lies in Huetter Wohld, on the boundary to Ivendorf. The terrain falls northeast from this point over Huetten (35m) to the mouth of the Waidbach at 22m. The largest tarn in the municipality, resulting from peat extraction is to be found here. The terrain then rises to Parkentin (26m) and then falls in a northerly direction. The lowest point (6m) is to be found on the northeast municipality boundary to Bargeshagen on the B105. The Rotbach also traverses the municipality at this point. At the western edge, on the boundary to Bad Doberan there is a 78 Hectare part of the Walkmueller Holz. The Stege, which is formed by the Waidbach south of Parkentin, flows in a northerly direction through the 3.3 km-long linear village of Bartenhagen.

In the south of the municipality lies the former landfill site belonging to the city of Rostock, which was closed in 2000 and presents a noticeable hill covering around 26 Hectares.

== History ==
Parkentin was first recorded in 1177 and until 1552 belonged to the monastery at Bad Doberan. The church was built in multiple stages, beginning in the 13th Century. The oldest part is the Choir. Frescos from the 15th Century were discovered in 1899 and have been restored. A late addition is the tower with four gables. The pulpit is from 1615.

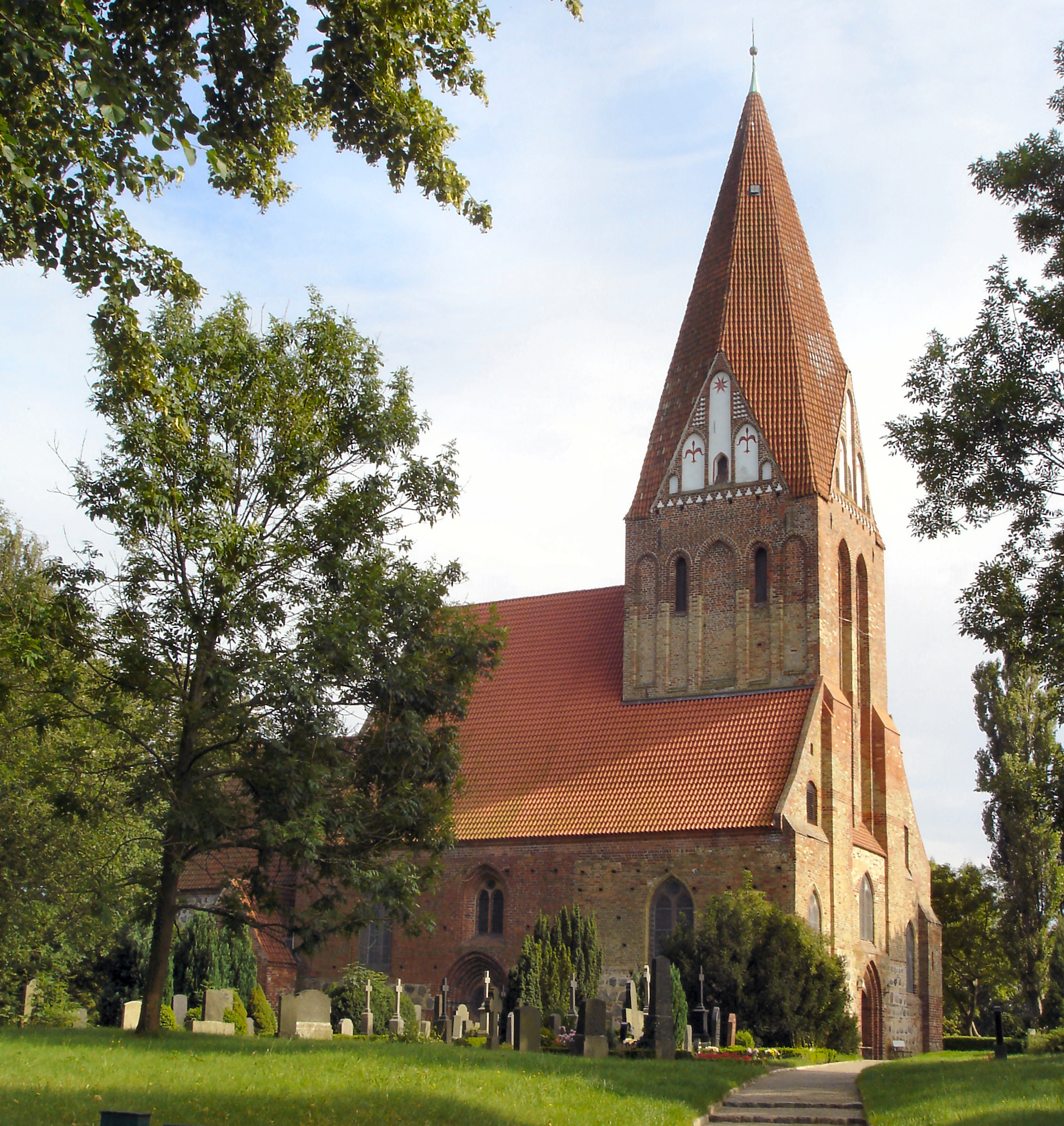
Parkentin parish church

Around 1300 Rabenhorst (Rethwisch) also belonged for a time to the parish. In 1333 Duke Albrecht the 2nd gave the control over Parkentin to the cloister. After the secularisation and the disbandment of the monastery control over the parish returned to the dukedom. The first evangelical pastor appointed by the duke and not the monastery was Brand Meseke in 1557.

The hamlet of Huetten was first recorded in 1268. In Huetter Wohld, an extensive beech wood, the monks from Bad Doberan found ideal conditions for fish ponds and created a string of many reservoirs, which are still in use today. Due to the local availability of quartz sand and the forest for fuel, a glassworks (Glashuette in German, leading to the name Huetten) was operated by the monks from 1268.

The hamlet of Neuhof was first recorded in 1383 and added to the parish of Parkentin in 1927.

== Transport ==
The northern end of Bartenshagen adjoins the Bundesstrasse 105 between Rostock and Bad Doberan. Parkentin lies on the railway line from Tessin/Rostock to Wismar. Bus routes link the municipality to Bad Doberan and Rostock.
