= Broderstorf station =

Railway station in Broderstorf, Germany

Broderstorf
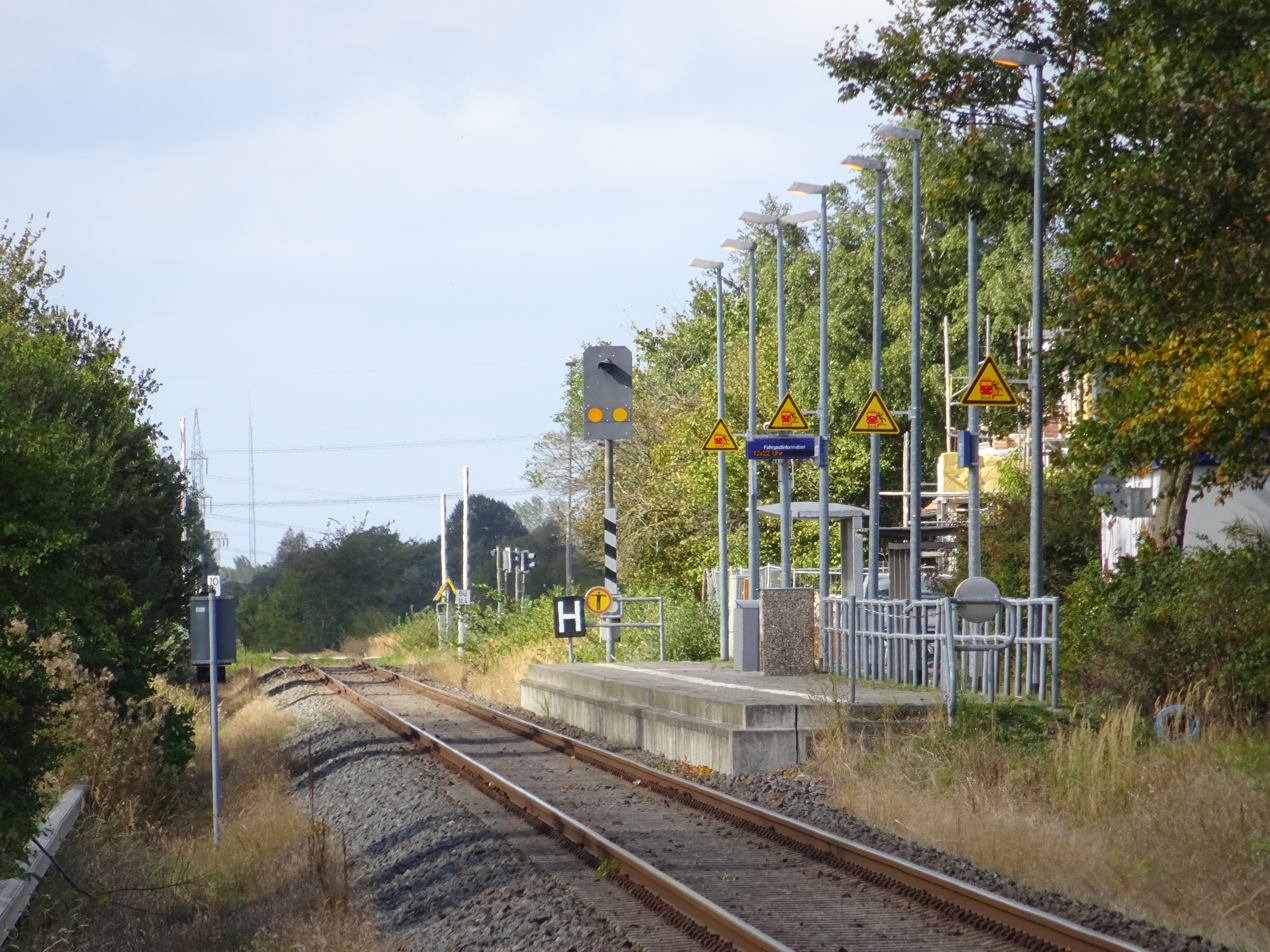
- 2018

General information
- Location: Rostocker Straße 2; 18184 Broderstorf; Mecklenburg-Vorpommern; Germany
- Coordinates: 54°04′44″N 12°15′47″E
- System: Hp
- Owner: DB Netz
- Operator: DB Station&Service
- Lines: Rostock–Tribsees/Tessin railway (KBS 185)
- Platforms: 1 side platform
- Tracks: 1
- Train operators: DB Regio Nordost

Construction
- Parking: yes
- Cycle facilities: yes
- Accessible: yes

Other information
- Station code: 892
- DS100 code: WBTF
- IBNR: 8011270
- Category: 7
- Website: www.bahnhof.de

Services
Preceding station	DB Regio Nordost	Following station
Roggentin towards Wismar	RB 11	Groß Lüsewitz towards Tessin
Location
- Location within Mecklenburg-Vorpommern Location within Germany Location within Europe

Broderstorf station is a railway station in the municipality of Broderstorf, located in the Rostock district in Mecklenburg-Vorpommern, Germany.
