= Pölchow =

- Municipality
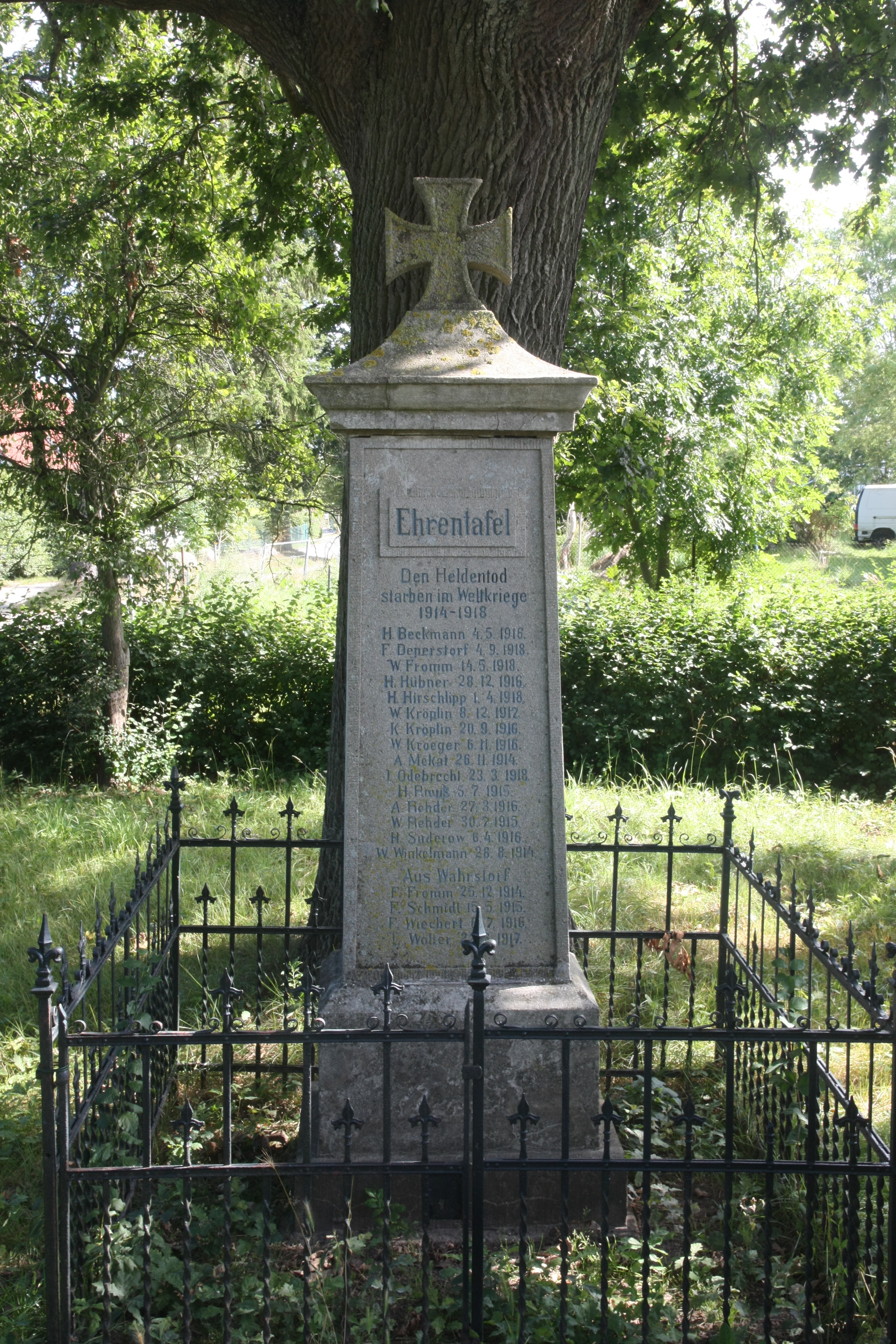
- War memorial in Pölchow

- Flag Coat of arms

- Location of Pölchow within Rostock district
- Interactive map of Pölchow
- Location within Germany Location within Mecklenburg-Vorpommern
- Coordinates: 54°00′35″N 12°05′50″E
- Country: Germany
- State: Mecklenburg-Vorpommern
- District: Rostock
- Municipal assoc.: Warnow-West

Government
  - Mayor: Gudrun Klaus

Area
  - Total: 12.74 km^{2} (4.92 sq mi)
- Elevation: 38 m (125 ft)

Population (2025-12-31)
  - Total: 943
  - Density: 74.0/km^{2} (192/sq mi)
- Time zone: UTC+01:00 (CET)
  - Summer (DST): UTC+02:00 (CEST)
- Postal codes: 18059
- Dialling codes: 038207
- Vehicle registration: LRO
- Website: www.amt-warnow-west.de

Pölchow is a municipality in the Rostock district, in Mecklenburg-Vorpommern, Germany. The commune is administered by the Amt Warnow-West, which is located in the municipality of Kritzmow.

The districts Huckstorf and Wahrstorf belong to Pölchow.

The proximity to Rostock and the good traffic connection (Baltic Sea motorway A 20) let the municipality grow strongly in the last years. In addition to the numerous homes that have been built, a number of commercial enterprises have also settled in the town.

== Geography ==
The municipality of Pölchow is about ten kilometres south of the Rostock city centre. The area around the municipality is about 40 m higher than the valley of the lower Warnow, which has been designated a landscape conservation area east of Pölchow.
