= Mandelshagen =

- Ortsteil of Blankenhagen
- Interactive map of Mandelshagen
- Location within Germany Location within Mecklenburg-Vorpommern
- Coordinates: 54°09′N 12°23′E
- Country: Germany
- State: Mecklenburg-Vorpommern
- District: Rostock
- Municipality: Blankenhagen

Area
  - Total: 16.16 km^{2} (6.24 sq mi)
- Elevation: 50 m (160 ft)

Population (2010-12-31)
  - Total: 256
  - Density: 15.8/km^{2} (41.0/sq mi)
- Time zone: UTC+01:00 (CET)
  - Summer (DST): UTC+02:00 (CEST)
- Postal codes: 18184
- Dialling codes: 038202, 038209
- Vehicle registration: DBR
- Website: www.amtcarbaek.de

Mandelshagen is a village and a former municipality in the Rostock district, in Mecklenburg-Vorpommern, Germany. Since 1 January 2012, it is part of the municipality Blankenhagen.
