= Boocksee =

Lake in Mecklenburg-Vorpommern, Germany

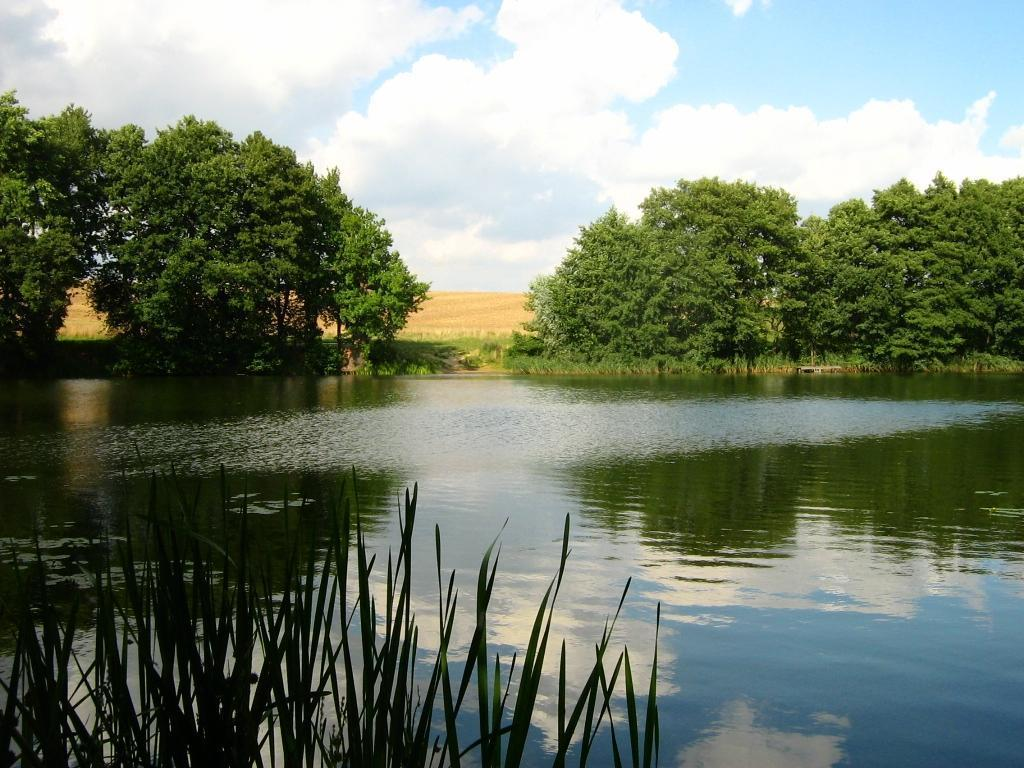

- Location within Mecklenburg-Vorpommern
- Location: Rostock, Mecklenburg-Vorpommern
- Coordinates: 54.05042°N 12.57122°E
- Basin countries: Germany
- Surface area: 0.073 km^{2} (0.028 sq mi)
- Surface elevation: 24.2 m (79 ft)

Boocksee is a lake in Thelkow, a municipality in the Rostock district in Mecklenburg-Vorpommern, Germany. At an elevation of 24.2 m, its surface area is 0.073 km^{2}.
