= B Tower =

Historic East German watchtower

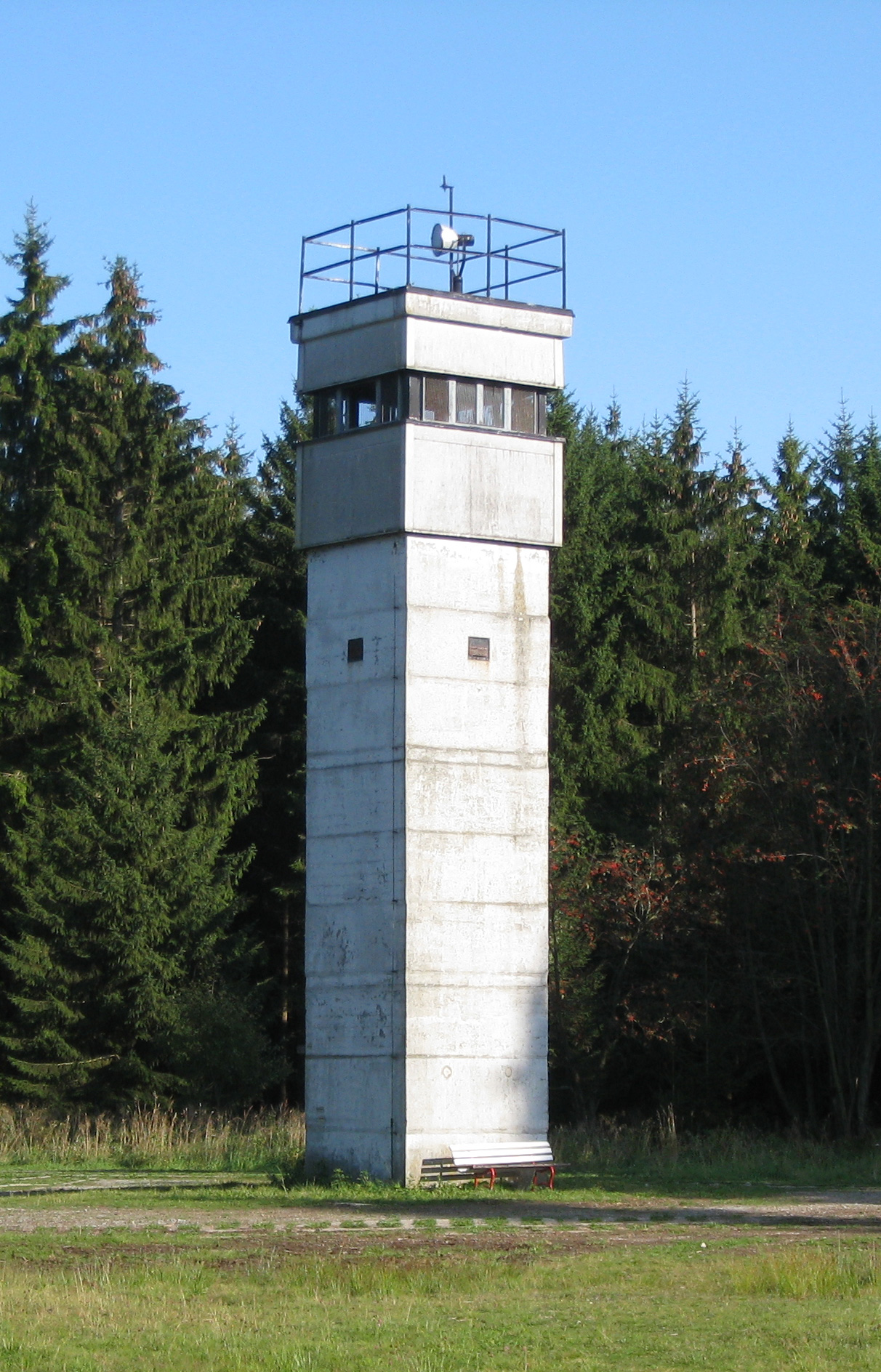
Square 2x2 metre watchtower (9 metres high)

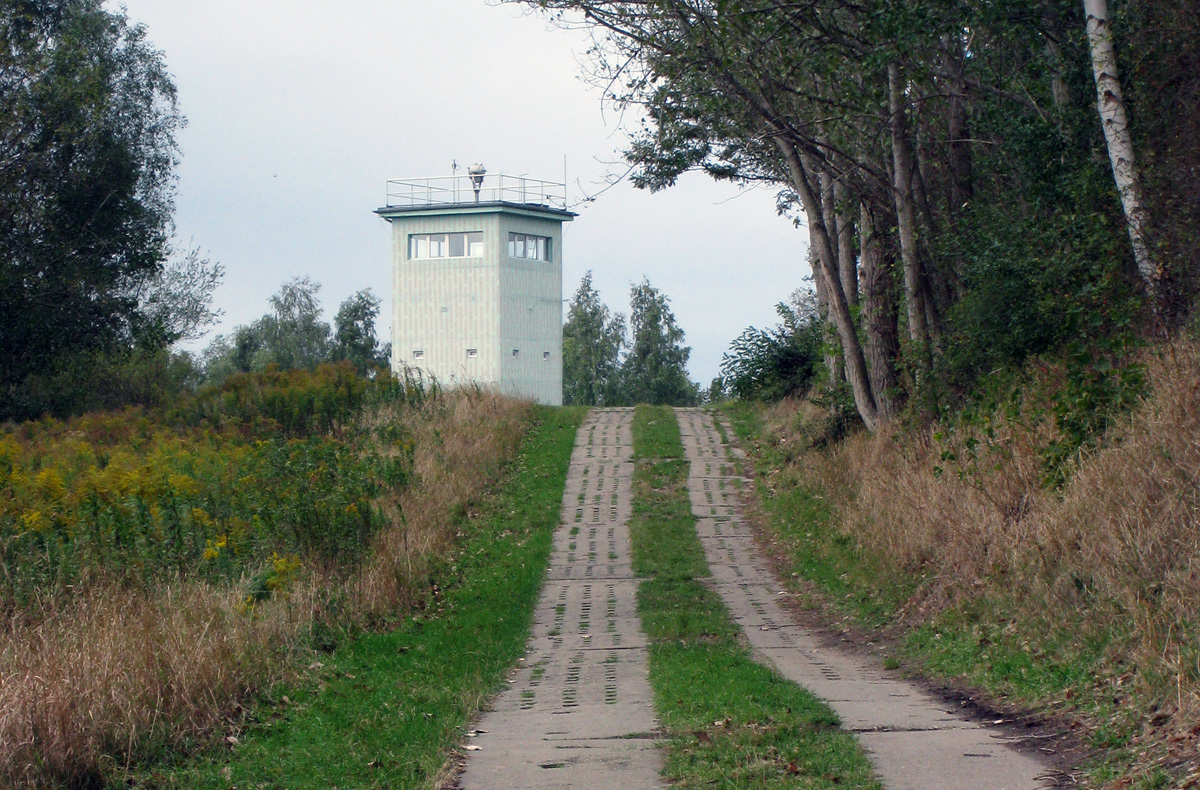
Square 4x4 metre watchtower

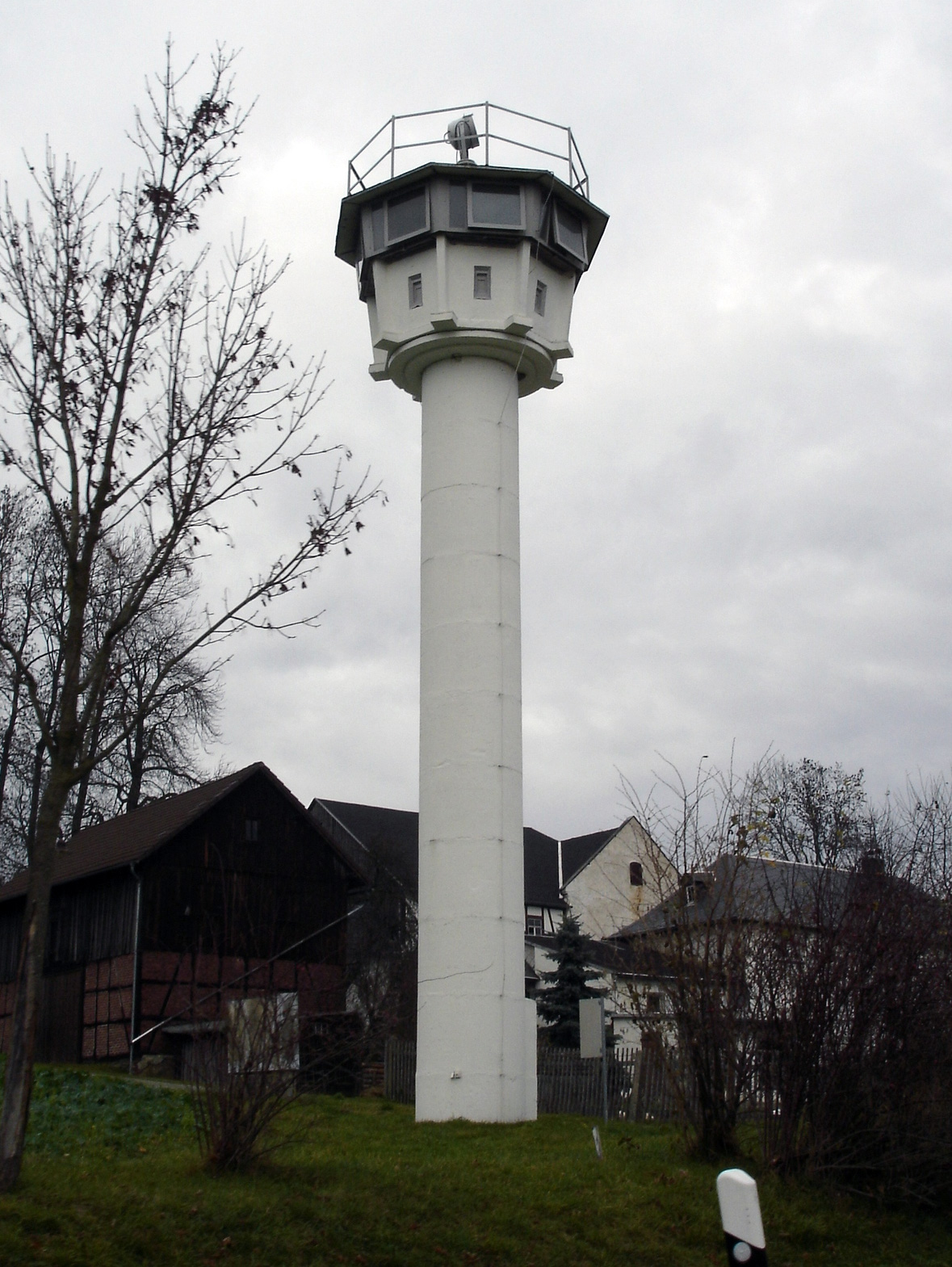
Cylindrical watchtower (11 meters high)

A B Tower (German: B-Turm, short for Beobachtungsturm) was a type of watchtower used by the East German Border Guards.

These towers were built to a standard design and made of precast concrete sections and referred to by the abbreviations "BT 4x4", "BT 9" or "BT 11" - the older Type 11 was cylindrical; the later Type 9 had a square floor plan, as did the Type 4x4. These numbers referred either to the height of the tower (e.g. 9 or 11 metres) or its floor plan (e.g. 4 x 4 metres). They varied in height depending on local circumstances and were accessed through a steel door that was usually hidden from the direction of the border. Offset metal ladders led via two or three intermediate corrugated steel floors to the top. The main observation deck was equipped with seating, rifle racks, an air filter system, signaling equipment, log book, mapping material, dedicated communications to the border reporting net, electric heating and emergency and rescue equipment including abseiling kit. It had room for 4-5 soldiers who, usually, formed the "Warning Group" (Alarmgruppe). The roof terrace was protected by a steel pipe railing and could be accessed through a lockable, airtight steel hatch. On the roof was a movable, remotely operated searchlight (elevation -/+ 90 degrees, azimuth 360 degrees).

The BT 4x4 was characterized by its square shape with dimensions of 4 by 4 meters, as opposed to the type (BT-9) with its more slender dimensions of 2 x 2 meters. The other visual key difference between the two types are the windows on the top floor: The windows of the BT 4x4 do not run the full width of the tower whereas the windows in the BT-9 do.

Other common abbreviations for the BT 4x4 are BTv 4x4 ("Beobachtungsturm viereckig, 4x4") or FüSt ("Führungsstelle"). The tower has the following levels:

- Basement
- Ground floor with arrest cells
- 1st floor with sleeping compartments for a half squad, with two small windows per side, suitable as a loophole
- 2nd floor with observation platform, and alarm and signalling equipment. Four windows face each of the four sides.
- Roof, with railing and search light, possibly antennas

== See also ==
- A Tower
- Baltic Sea watchtower, Börgerende
- Baltic Sea watchtower, Kühlungsborn
