= Steinfeld, Mecklenburg-Vorpommern =

Village in Mecklenburg-Vorpommern, Germany

Steinfeld
- Ortsteil of Broderstorf
- Interactive map of Steinfeld
- Location within Germany Location within Mecklenburg-Vorpommern
- Coordinates: 54°6′N 12°18′E
- Country: Germany
- State: Mecklenburg-Vorpommern
- District: Rostock
- Municipality: Broderstorf

Area
  - Total: 13.50 km^{2} (5.21 sq mi)
- Elevation: 49 m (161 ft)

Population (2011-12-31)
  - Total: 557
  - Density: 41.3/km^{2} (107/sq mi)
- Time zone: UTC+01:00 (CET)
  - Summer (DST): UTC+02:00 (CEST)
- Postal codes: 18184
- Dialling codes: 038202, 038204
- Vehicle registration: LRO
- Website: www.amtcarbaek.de

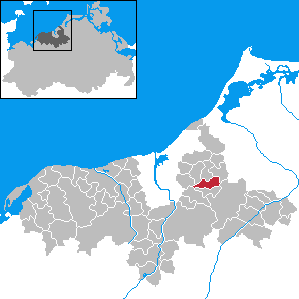
Map of Steinfeld

Steinfeld (German pronunciation: [ˈʃtaɪnˌfɛlt]) is a village and a former municipality in the Rostock district, in Mecklenburg-Vorpommern, Germany. Since 1 January 2013, it is part of the municipality Broderstorf.
