= Ziesendorf =

- Municipality
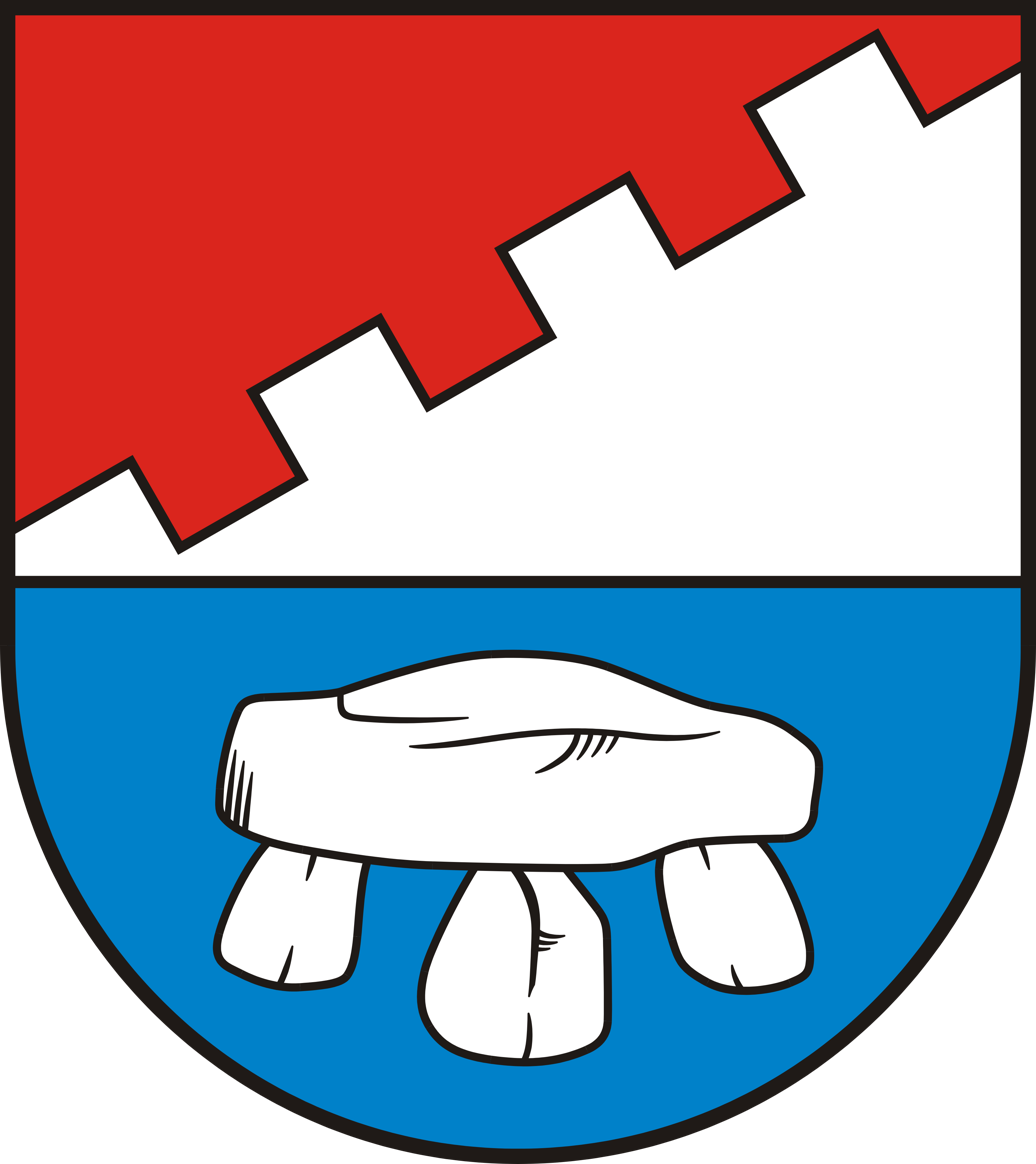
- Coat of arms

- Location of Ziesendorf within Rostock district
- Interactive map of Ziesendorf
- Location within Germany Location within Mecklenburg-Vorpommern
- Coordinates: 53°59′N 12°02′E
- Country: Germany
- State: Mecklenburg-Vorpommern
- District: Rostock
- Municipal assoc.: Warnow-West

Government
  - Mayor (2019–24): Thomas Witt

Area
  - Total: 26.42 km^{2} (10.20 sq mi)
- Elevation: 27 m (89 ft)

Population (2025-12-31)
  - Total: 1,425
  - Density: 53.94/km^{2} (139.7/sq mi)
- Time zone: UTC+01:00 (CET)
  - Summer (DST): UTC+02:00 (CEST)
- Postal codes: 18059
- Dialling codes: 038207
- Vehicle registration: LRO, DBR, ROS
- Website: www.amt-warnow-west.de

Ziesendorf is a municipality in the Rostock district, in Mecklenburg-Vorpommern, Germany. The Mayor of Ziesendorf is Thomas Witt (Aktive Gemeinde Ziesendorf).
