= Steffenshagen =

- Municipality
- Location of Steffenshagen within Rostock district
- Interactive map of Steffenshagen
- Location within Germany Location within Mecklenburg-Vorpommern
- Coordinates: 54°6′N 11°50′E
- Country: Germany
- State: Mecklenburg-Vorpommern
- District: Rostock
- Municipal assoc.: Bad Doberan-Land

Government
  - Mayor: Georg Endmann

Area
  - Total: 9.32 km^{2} (3.60 sq mi)
- Elevation: 56 m (184 ft)

Population (2025-12-31)
  - Total: 561
  - Density: 60.2/km^{2} (156/sq mi)
- Time zone: UTC+01:00 (CET)
  - Summer (DST): UTC+02:00 (CEST)
- Postal codes: 18209
- Dialling codes: 038203
- Vehicle registration: LRO
- Website: www.doberan-land.de

Steffenshagen is a municipality in the Rostock district, in Mecklenburg-Vorpommern, Germany.
