= Kirch Mulsow =

- Ortsteil of Carinerland
- Interactive map of Kirch Mulsow
- Location within Germany Location within Mecklenburg-Vorpommern
- Coordinates: 53°57′N 11°41′E
- Country: Germany
- State: Mecklenburg-Vorpommern
- District: Rostock
- Municipality: Carinerland

Area
  - Total: 14.50 km^{2} (5.60 sq mi)
- Elevation: 73 m (240 ft)

Population (2017-12-31)
  - Total: 298
  - Density: 20.6/km^{2} (53.2/sq mi)
- Time zone: UTC+01:00 (CET)
  - Summer (DST): UTC+02:00 (CEST)
- Postal codes: 18233
- Dialling codes: 038294, 038295, 038297
- Vehicle registration: LRO
- Website: neubukow-salzhaff.de

Kirch Mulsow is a village and a former municipality in the Rostock district, in Mecklenburg-Vorpommern, Germany. Since May 2019, it is part of the municipality Carinerland.
