= Reddelich =

- Municipality
- Location of Reddelich within Rostock district
- Interactive map of Reddelich
- Location within Germany Location within Mecklenburg-Vorpommern
- Coordinates: 54°5′N 11°51′E
- Country: Germany
- State: Mecklenburg-Vorpommern
- District: Rostock
- Municipal assoc.: Bad Doberan-Land

Government
  - Mayor: Erhard Rünger

Area
  - Total: 9.13 km^{2} (3.53 sq mi)
- Elevation: 79 m (259 ft)

Population (2025-12-31)
  - Total: 990
  - Density: 110/km^{2} (280/sq mi)
- Time zone: UTC+01:00 (CET)
  - Summer (DST): UTC+02:00 (CEST)
- Postal codes: 18209
- Dialling codes: 038203
- Vehicle registration: LRO
- Website: www.reddelich.de

Reddelich is a municipality in the Rostock district, in Mecklenburg-Vorpommern, Germany.

During the 2007 G8 summit in Heiligendamm, one of the protest camps was situated immediately to the south-west of Reddelich, with about 5000 anti-globalisation protesters staying there.
