= Poppendorf =

- Municipality
- Location of Poppendorf within Rostock district
- Interactive map of Poppendorf
- Location within Germany Location within Mecklenburg-Vorpommern
- Coordinates: 54°8′N 12°18′E
- Country: Germany
- State: Mecklenburg-Vorpommern
- District: Rostock
- Municipal assoc.: Carbäk

Government
  - Mayor: Ralf Kurths

Area
  - Total: 14.03 km^{2} (5.42 sq mi)
- Elevation: 42 m (138 ft)

Population (2025-12-31)
  - Total: 752
  - Density: 53.6/km^{2} (139/sq mi)
- Time zone: UTC+01:00 (CET)
  - Summer (DST): UTC+02:00 (CEST)
- Postal codes: 18184
- Dialling codes: 038202
- Vehicle registration: LRO
- Website: www.amtcarbaek.de

Poppendorf is a municipality in the Rostock district, in Mecklenburg-Vorpommern, Germany.

== Geography ==
The municipality of Poppendorf lies some 15 kilometres from the city of Rostock and the Baltic Sea coast in northern Germany . The gently rolling countryside is drained by the stream of the Peezer Bach in the direction of the bay of Breitling. East of Poppendorf there is an extensive forest that is designated as a protected area.
