= Baltic Sea watchtower, Kühlungsborn =

Watchtower in the village of Kühlungsborn, Mecklenburg-Western Pomerania

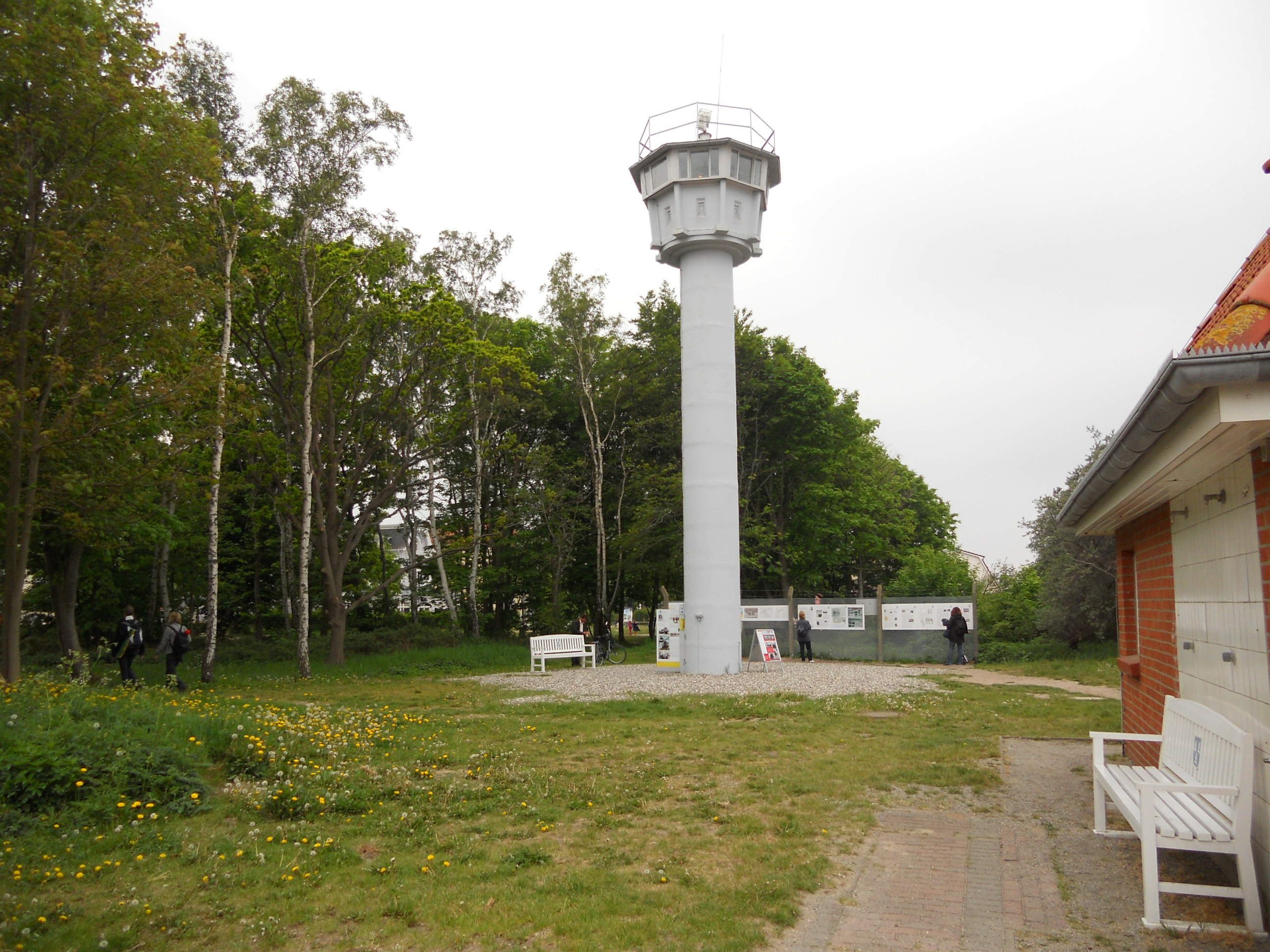
The Baltic Sea watchtower at Kühlungsborn

The Baltic Sea watchtower (German: Ostsee-Grenzturm) in Kühlungsborn is an old East German border troops watchtower that was manned by the Coastal Brigade (Grenzbrigade Küste) or GBK. As a maritime observation town of type BT 11 it was one of a series of originally 27 towers of this type on the coast of East Germany, of which only two survive.

== History and architecture ==
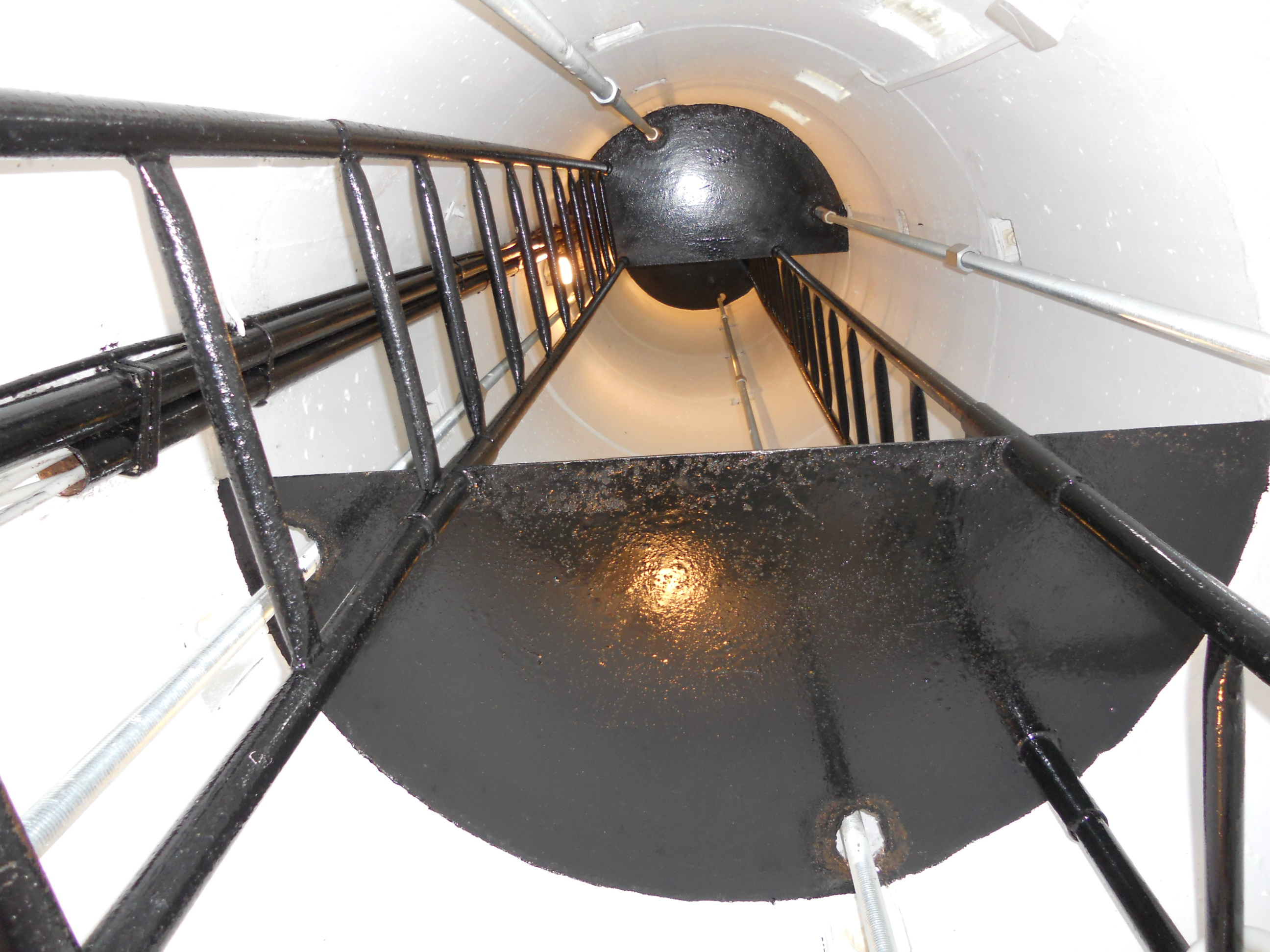
Interior view with steel ladder

The tower was built in 1972 and is located in Kühlungsborn Ost immediately next to the beach promenade, not far from the pier. The border defence soldiers of the Coastal Brigade had the task of observing shipping movements on the Baltic Sea and identifying escape attempts. By means of a fixed telescope with high magnification, the four-man crew could observe a wide area up to 12 nautical miles from the observation platform. At night the vicinity could be illuminated with a searchlight on the roof of the tower. The basic equipment on the observation deck included a radio station, a stand-by generator and heating. Below the windows were sealable embrasures for weapons. The guards recorded every apparently suspicious movement. The radio equipment was part of the border reporting network, so border patrol vessels and land-based units could be alerted immediately.

The Baltic Sea border tower dominated the landscape of the Baltic Sea coast. Soldiers of the Border Brigade patrolled the beach, and were supported as needed by mobile searchlights and fully equipped service vehicles.

== Society ==
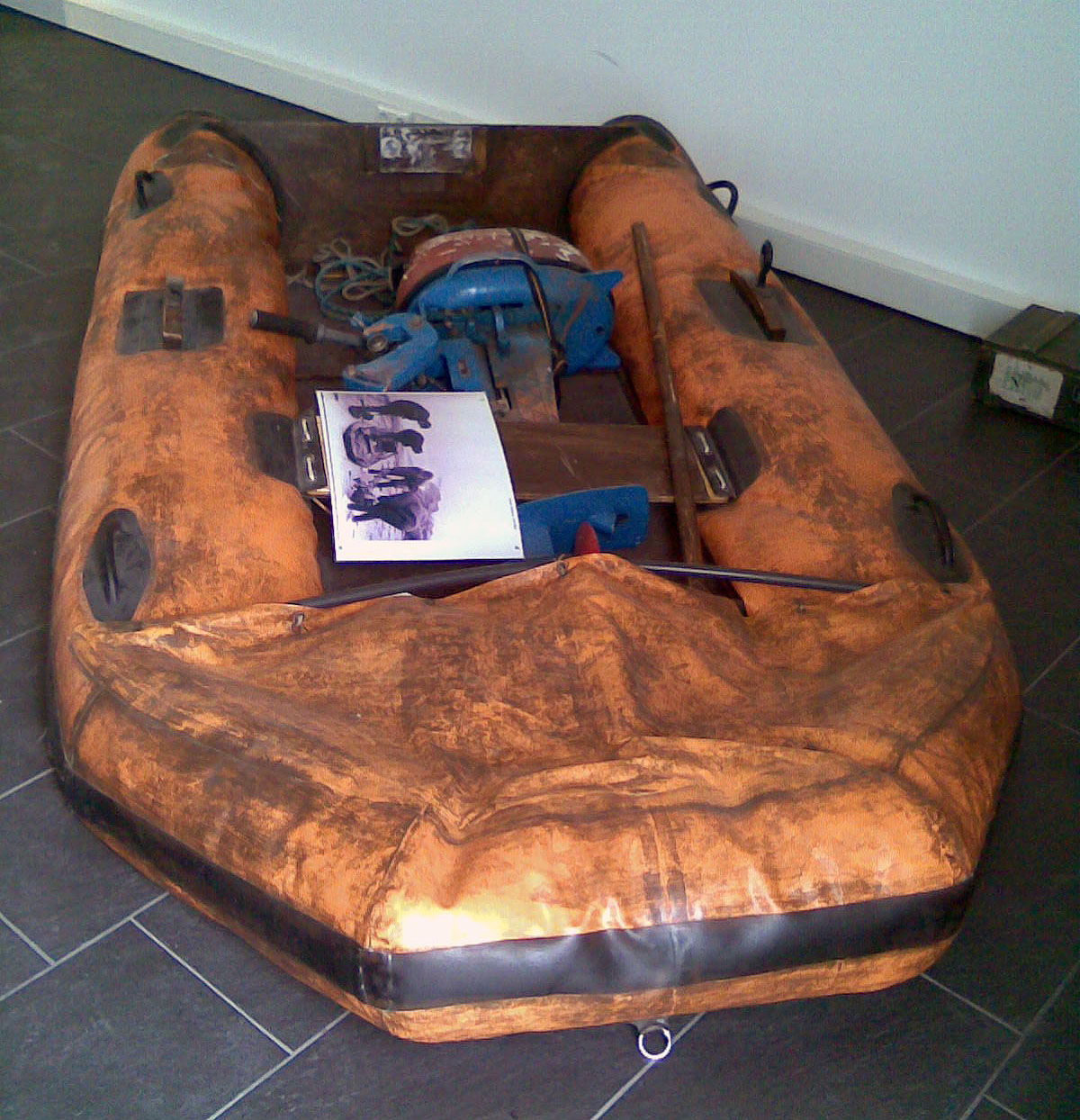
Using this boat a family with 2 children escaped over the Baltic

A society prevented the planned demolition of the tower in 1990 and, on their own initiative, restored the building and the technical facilities. In 1991 the border tower was declared a historic monument and it is included in the list of heritage monuments in Kühlungsborn. The tower is accessible using an internal steel ladder.

== Documented escape attempts ==
Information boards around the tower describe various successful escape attempts as well as those prevented by the border guards. One of the most famous escapees was Peter Döbler, who swam across the Baltic Sea in 1971, reaching the island of Fehmarn 45 km away after about 25 hours. In the exhibition room next to the watchtower are several items used for escapes, such as the inflatable boat that took a family with two children. Some of the soldiers' issued equipment are also displayed. The impact of the former Baltic Sea frontier on local residents is described.

=== Gallery ===
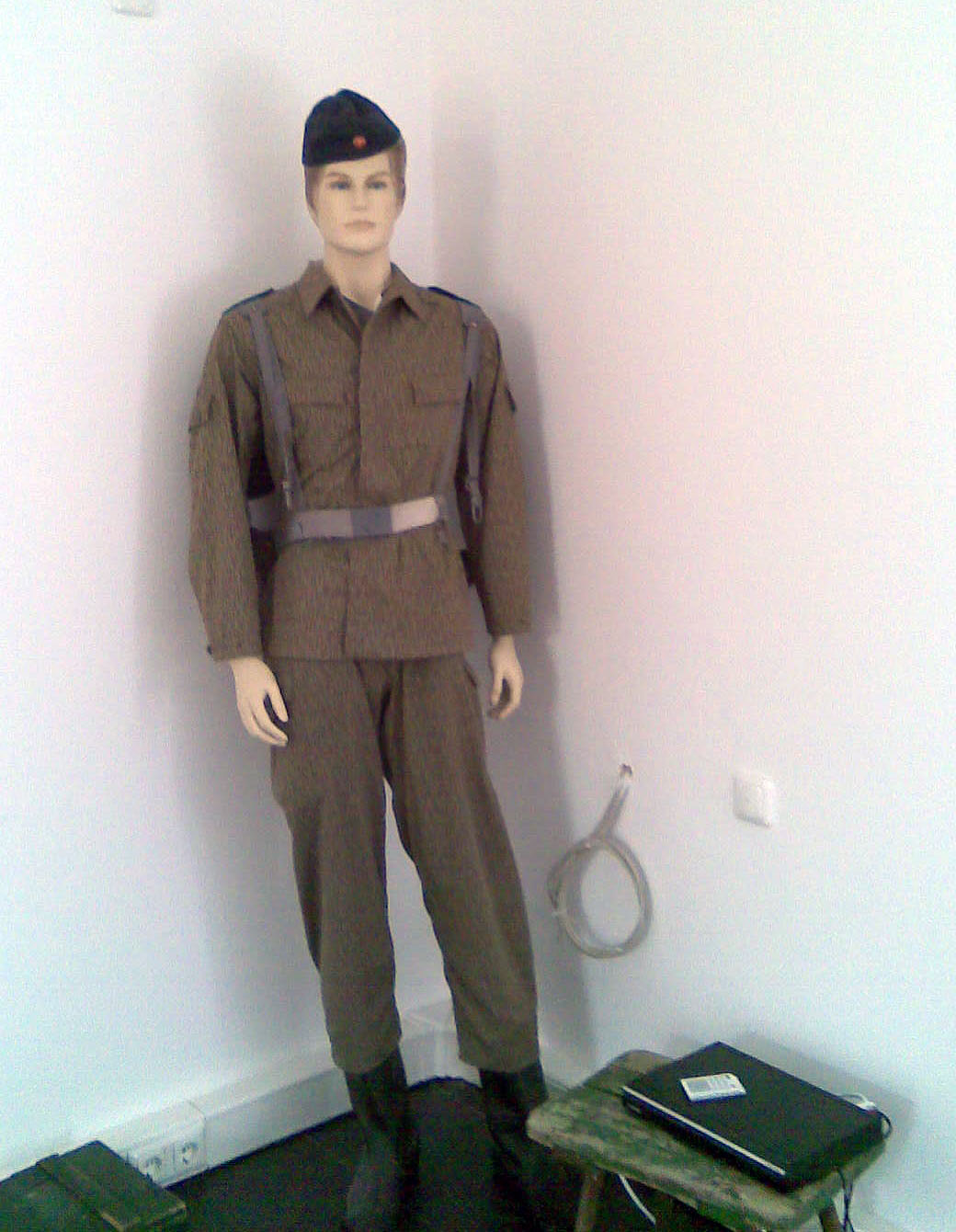
The border troops looked like this.

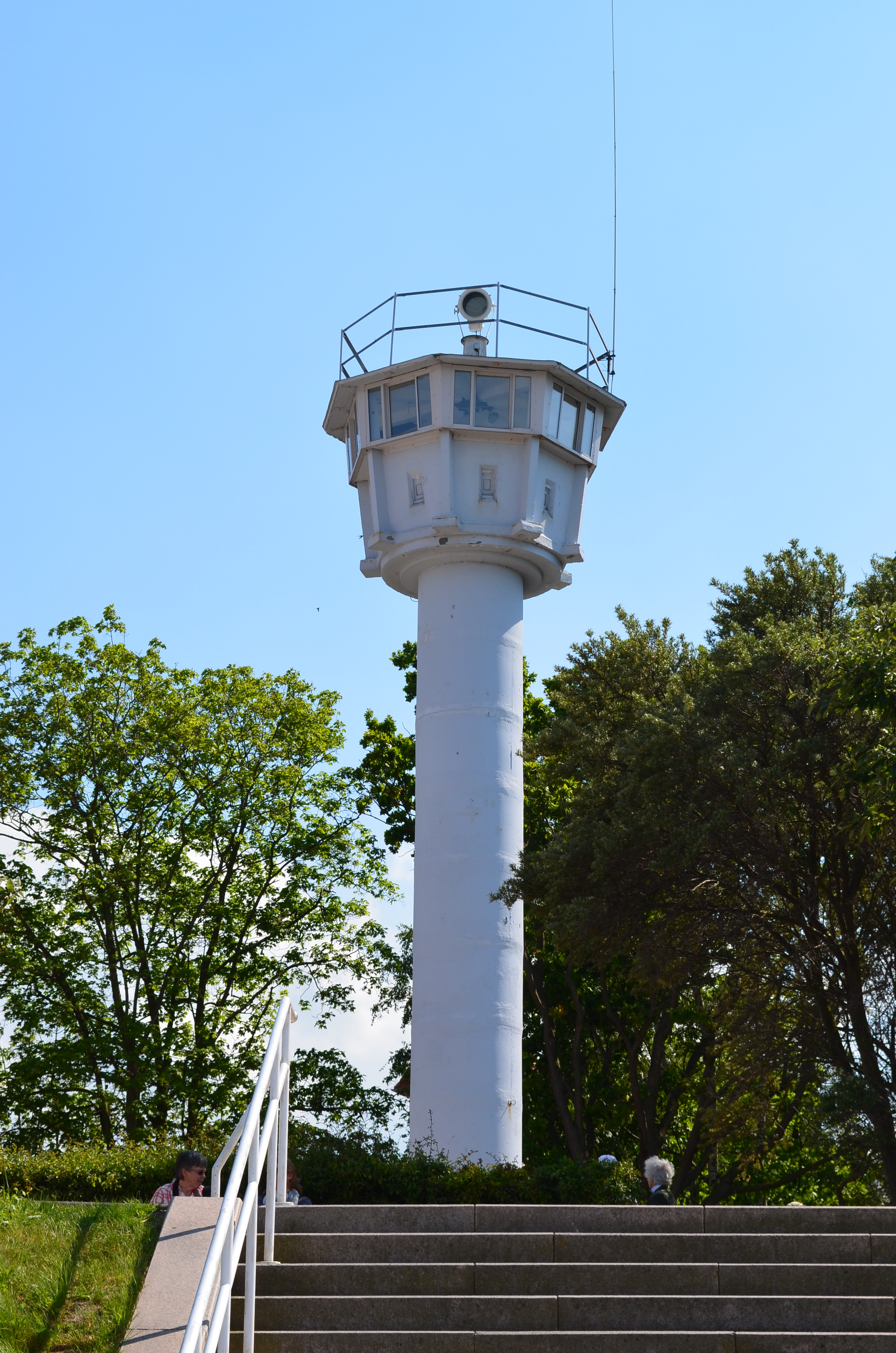
View from the sea side.

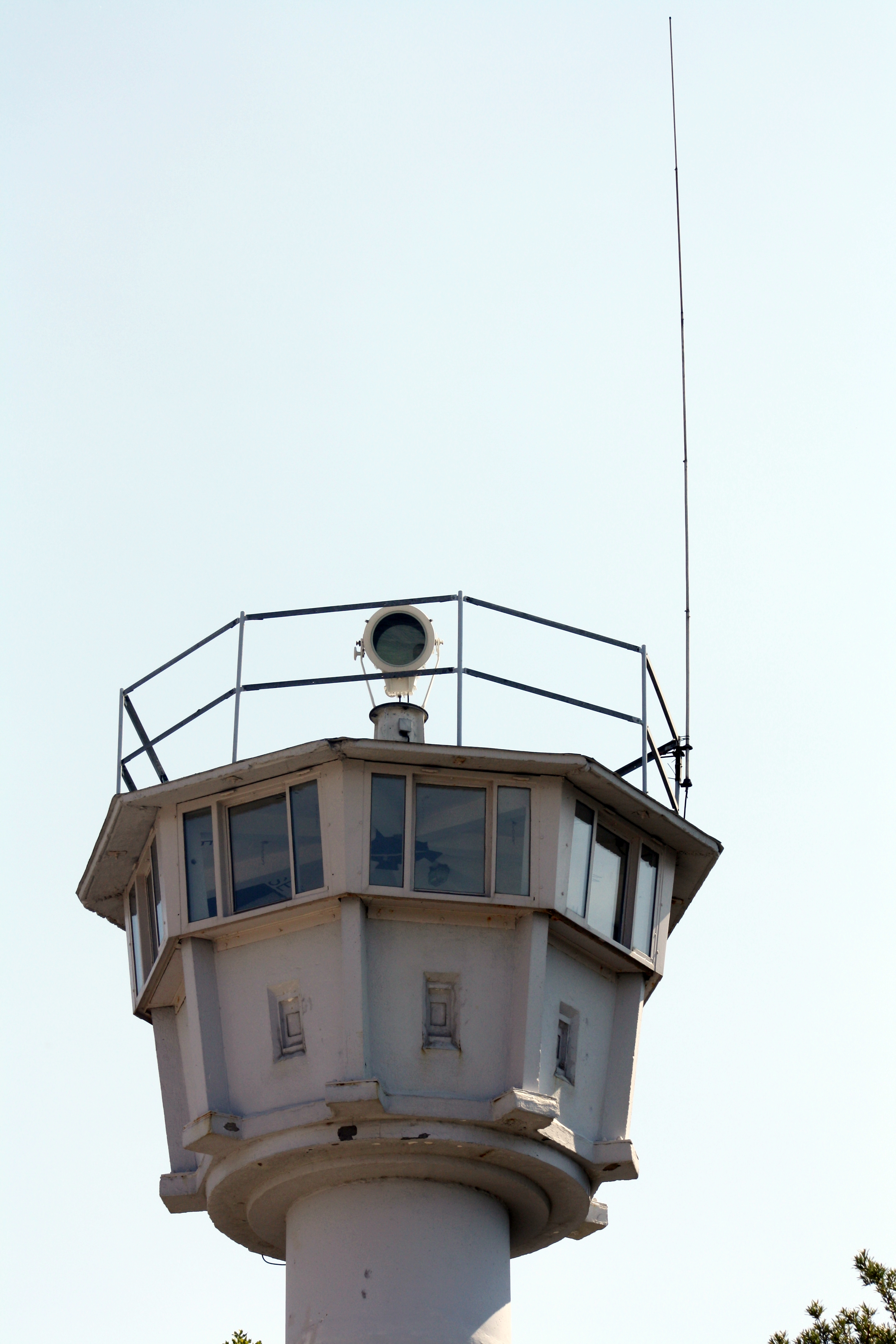
The observation deck at a height of 15 metres.

== See also ==
- Baltic Sea watchtower, Börgerende

== Sources ==
- Grenzturm e.V. Ostsee-Grenzturm, Denkmal und Begegnungsort in Erinnerung an die deutsche Teilung Broschüre, herausgegeben mit Unterstützung des Landesbeauftragten für Mecklenburg-Vorpommern für die Stasi Unterlagen.
