= Warnow-West =

- Amt
- Map of Rostock highlighting Warnow-West
- Interactive map of Warnow-West
- Location within Germany Location within Mecklenburg-Vorpommern
- Coordinates: 54°03′N 12°01′E
- Country: Germany
- State: Mecklenburg-Vorpommern
- District: Rostock
- Seat: Kritzmow
- Subdivisions: 7 municipalities

Area
  - Total: 117.38 km^{2} (45.32 sq mi)

Population (2025-12-31)
  - Total: 17,166
  - Density: 146.24/km^{2} (378.77/sq mi)
- Time zone: UTC+01:00 (CET)
  - Summer (DST): UTC+02:00 (CEST)
- Website: www.amt-warnow-west.de

Warnow-West is an Amt in the district of Rostock, in Mecklenburg-Vorpommern, Germany. The seat of the Amt is in Kritzmow.

The Amt Warnow-West consists of the following municipalities:

1. Elmenhorst/Lichtenhagen
2. Kritzmow
3. Lambrechtshagen
4. Papendorf
5. Pölchow
6. Stäbelow
7. Ziesendorf
