= Elmenhorst/Lichtenhagen =

- Municipality
- Coat of arms

- Location of Elmenhorst/Lichtenhagen within Rostock district
- Interactive map of Elmenhorst/Lichtenhagen
- Location within Germany Location within Mecklenburg-Vorpommern
- Coordinates: 54°08′N 12°01′E
- Country: Germany
- State: Mecklenburg-Vorpommern
- District: Rostock
- Municipal assoc.: Warnow-West

Government
  - Mayor: Horst Harbrecht

Area
  - Total: 12.05 km^{2} (4.65 sq mi)
- Elevation: 9 m (30 ft)

Population (2025-12-31)
  - Total: 4,222
  - Density: 350.4/km^{2} (907.5/sq mi)
- Time zone: UTC+01:00 (CET)
  - Summer (DST): UTC+02:00 (CEST)
- Postal codes: 18107
- Dialling codes: 038327
- Vehicle registration: LRO
- Website: www.amt-warnow-west.de

Elmenhorst/Lichtenhagen (German pronunciation: [ˈɛlmənhɔʁst lɪçtn̩ˈhaːɡn̩]) is a municipality in the Rostock district, in Mecklenburg-Vorpommern, Germany.

== Geography ==
Elmenhorst/Lichtenhagen is located in the "Hägerortes" district, between the lower reaches of the little Warnow River and Bad Doberan, close to the Baltic Sea (known in German as the East Sea) coast. The municipality includes nearly a kilometer of protected nature reserve along the Stoltera cliffs.

== History ==
A settlement round a green called Lichtenhagen is recorded from 1264 in connection with a church appointment, and the church itself has a surviving mention from 1319, by which time the church had already been built.

At the start of the fourteenth century Lichtenhagen was held by the von Gummern family. A branch of the von Schnakenburg family, which had been based in nearby Diedrichshagen till 1359 was also here.

By the second half of the fifteenth century Lichtenhagen was at least in part the property of a man called Nikolaus Hasenkop and of his sons Hermann and Nikolaus. However, in a document dated 3 January 1505 the widow of Klaus, the last of the von Gummern land owners here, transferred several fiefs including Lichtenhagen to Duke Balthasar of Mecklenburg and his nephew, Duke Henry of Mecklenburg. A generation later, in 1531, Hans von Gummern who was a nephew of Klaus undertook a litigation to recover the lands transferred by his uncle's widow, but his case failed. Lichtenhagen therefore remained within a ducal domain.

The first surviving record of "Elmenhorst" dates from 1320 at which time it was a village settlement strung along a single street.

In 1960 Elmenhorst and Lichtenhagen were formally merged for administrative purposes, and in January 1992 the name of the combined municipality was changed to Elmenhorst/Lichtenhagen.

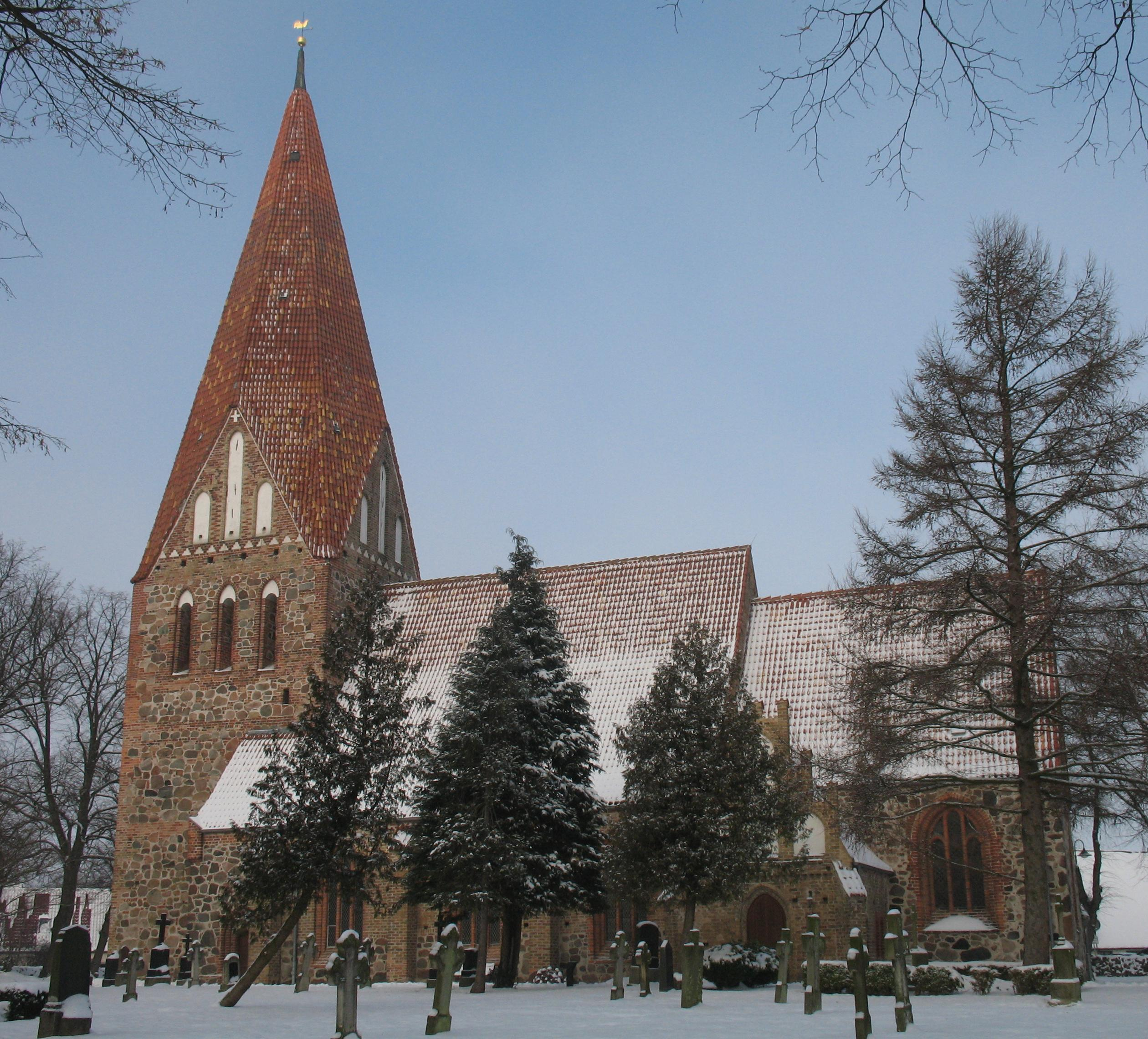
Church

== Economy ==
The economy of the place is defined by the proximity of the Baltic Sea, which supports tourism, and of Rostock which is where many of the citizens work.

The name "Elmenhorst" is also known in the region for the "Elmenhorster Fruchtsaftgetränke GmbH", a company involved in the extraction, bottling and distribution of fruit juice.
