= Baltic Sea watchtower, Börgerende =

Coordinates: 54°09′00.5″N 11°53′07.5″E

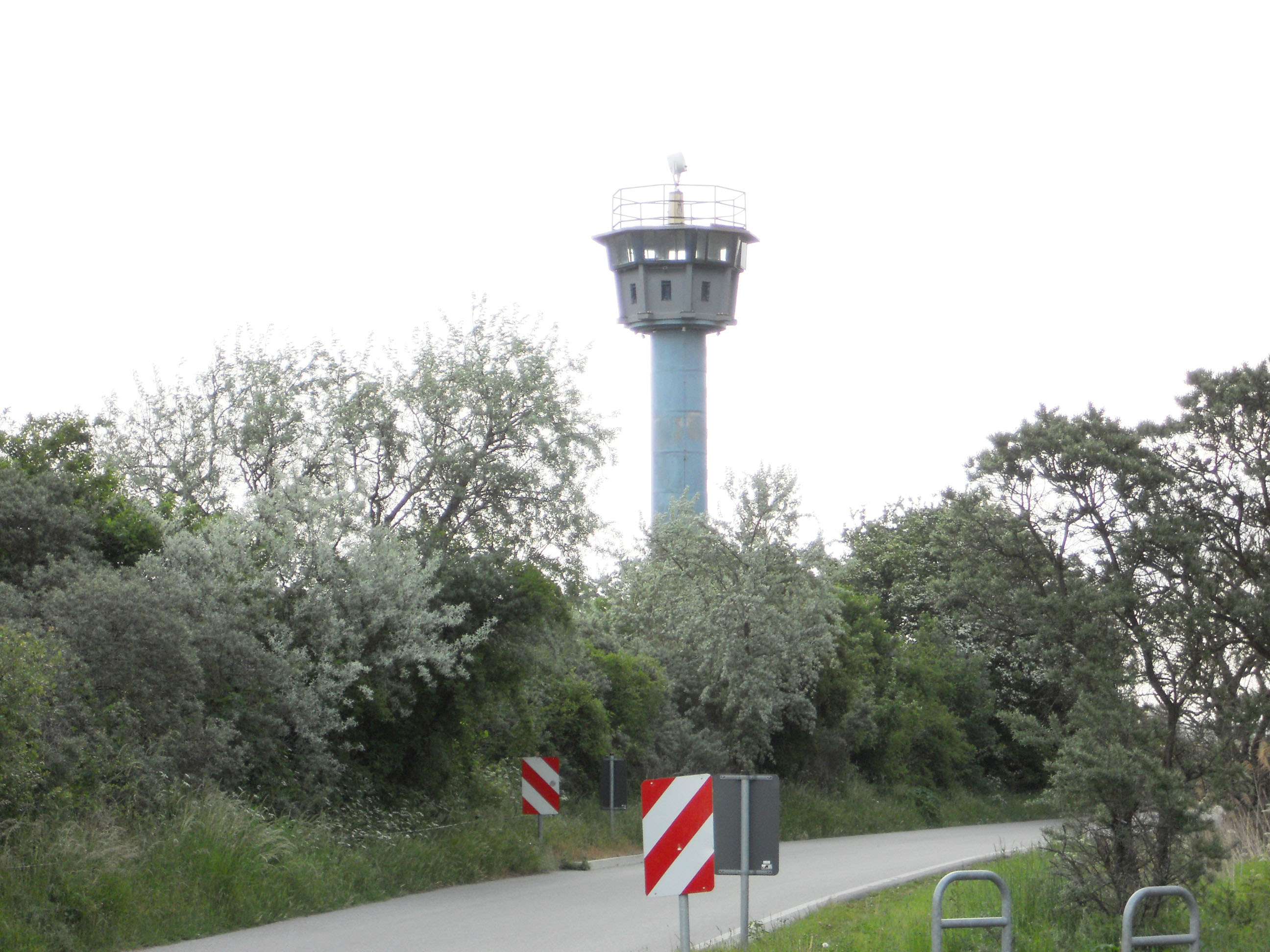
Baltic Sea watchtower

The Baltic Sea watchtower (German: Ostsee-Grenzturm) in Börgerende is an old watchtower that belonged to the Coastal Brigade (Grenzbrigade Küste) of the East German Border Troops. As a maritime border observation tower (of type BT 11) it belonged to a series of originally 27 towers of this type on the Baltic Sea coast of East Germany, of which two have survived. The other remaining tower is in Kühlungsborn.

The tower is located right next to the beach. The East German border soldiers had the mission of observing shipping movements on the Baltic Sea and identifying escape attempts. By means of a fixed telescope with high magnification the four man crew could observe a wide area of up to 12 nautical miles distance from the observation platform.

The tower is recorded in the List of heritage monuments in Börgerende. The tower is accessible using a ladder on the inside. It is currently being restored.
