= Bad Doberan-Land =

- Amt
- Location of Bad Doberan-Land within Rostock district
- Interactive map of Bad Doberan-Land
- Location within Germany Location within Mecklenburg-Vorpommern
- Coordinates: 54°06′N 11°54′E
- Country: Germany
- State: Mecklenburg-Vorpommern
- District: Rostock

Government
  - Mayor: Klaus-Peter Wiendieck

Area
  - Total: 108.41 km^{2} (41.86 sq mi)

Population (2025-12-31)
  - Total: 12,180
  - Density: 112.4/km^{2} (291.0/sq mi)
- Time zone: UTC+01:00 (CET)
  - Summer (DST): UTC+02:00 (CEST)
- Vehicle registration: DBR
- Website: www.doberan-land.de

Bad Doberan-Land is an Amt in the district of Rostock, in Mecklenburg-Vorpommern, Germany. The seat of the Amt is in Bad Doberan, itself not part of the Amt.

== Subdivision ==
The Amt Bad Doberan-Land consists of the following municipalities:

1. Admannshagen-Bargeshagen
2. Bartenshagen-Parkentin
3. Börgerende-Rethwisch
4. Hohenfelde
5. Nienhagen
6. Reddelich
7. Retschow
8. Steffenshagen
9. Wittenbeck
