= Thulendorf =

- Municipality
- Coat of arms

- Location of Thulendorf within Rostock district
- Interactive map of Thulendorf
- Location within Germany Location within Mecklenburg-Vorpommern
- Coordinates: 54°05′N 12°17′E
- Country: Germany
- State: Mecklenburg-Vorpommern
- District: Rostock
- Municipal assoc.: Carbäk

Government
  - Mayor: Heike Arndt

Area
  - Total: 10.69 km^{2} (4.13 sq mi)
- Elevation: 48 m (157 ft)

Population (2025-12-31)
  - Total: 657
  - Density: 61.5/km^{2} (159/sq mi)
- Time zone: UTC+01:00 (CET)
  - Summer (DST): UTC+02:00 (CEST)
- Postal codes: 18184
- Dialling codes: 038204, 038209
- Vehicle registration: LRO
- Website: www.amtcarbaek.de

Thulendorf is a municipality in the Rostock district, in Mecklenburg-Vorpommern, Germany.
