= Börgerende-Rethwisch =

- Municipality
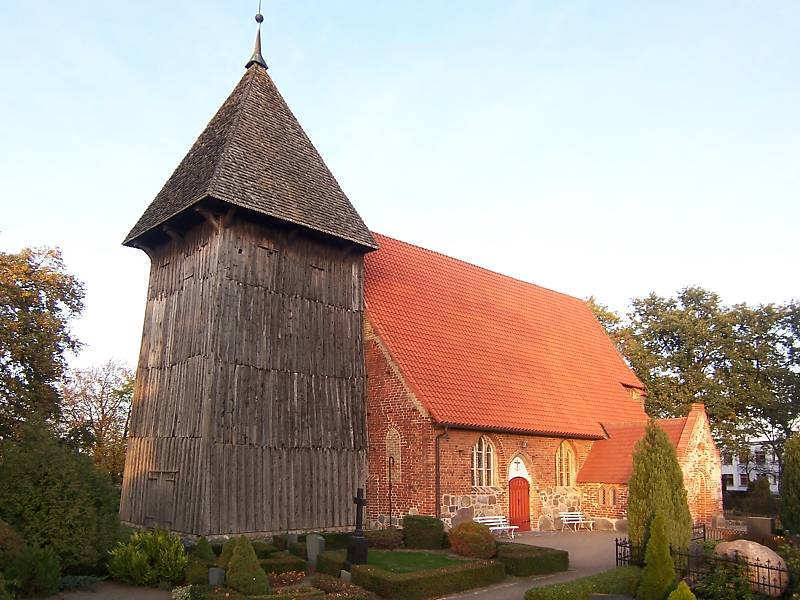
- Church in Rethwisch

- Flag Coat of arms

- Location of Börgerende-Rethwisch within Rostock district
- Interactive map of Börgerende-Rethwisch
- Location within Germany Location within Mecklenburg-Vorpommern
- Coordinates: 54°8′N 11°55′E
- Country: Germany
- State: Mecklenburg-Vorpommern
- District: Rostock
- Municipal assoc.: Bad Doberan-Land

Government
  - Mayor: Horst Hagemeister

Area
  - Total: 15.00 km^{2} (5.79 sq mi)
- Elevation: 2 m (6.6 ft)

Population (2025-12-31)
  - Total: 1,608
  - Density: 107.2/km^{2} (277.6/sq mi)
- Time zone: UTC+01:00 (CET)
  - Summer (DST): UTC+02:00 (CEST)
- Postal codes: 18211
- Dialling codes: 038203
- Vehicle registration: LRO
- Website: www.doberan-land.de

Börgerende-Rethwisch is a municipality in the Rostock district, in Mecklenburg-Vorpommern, Germany.

== Geography ==
The municipality runs from the Baltic Sea coast for almost 5 km southeast into the interior. Within its territory is the Conventer See, an old bay whose outlet to the Baltic has silted up turning it into a lake. The lake is a nature reserve which is known for its variety of waders and water fowl. To the west of Börgerende is Germany's oldest seaside resort, Heiligendamm.

As well as Börgerende and Rethwisch, the villages of Bahrenhorst and Neu Rethwisch are also part of the municipality.

== History ==
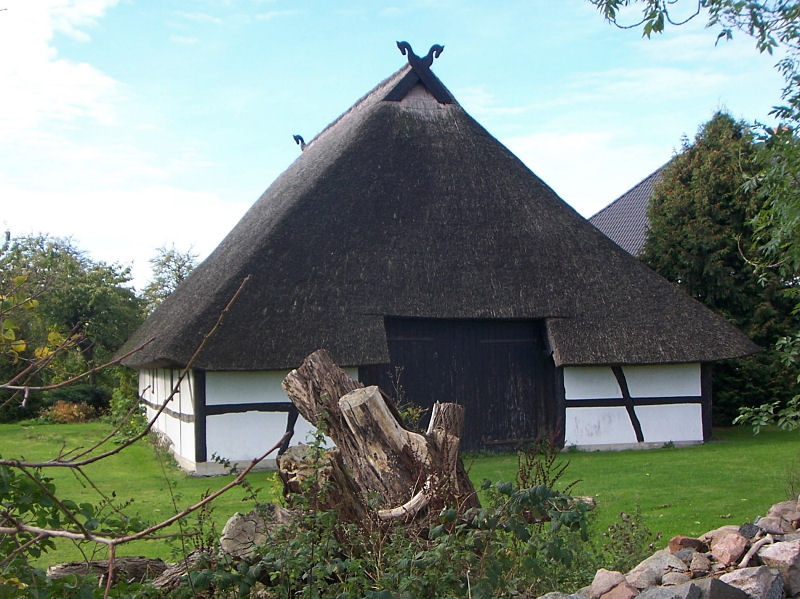
The Old Barn (Alte Scheune) in Rethwisch

The village of Rethwisch was first documented in 1297. In 1299, a clergyman from Doberan Abbey was installed in Rabenhorst. In the war damage assessment of 1312 of the damage caused by the conflict between Rostock's townsfolk under Nicholas and the troops of Henry the Lion an administrator (magister curie) of Doberan Abbey, a cemetery and a sexton were mentioned in connexion with the place. In addition to the administrator, there were at that time about twenty households in the village, all of which had German names. In 1353 comes the first record of a capella Redwisch (Rethwisch Chapel) and, one year later a ecclesia Redewisch (Rethwisch Church). Reference is made to the fact that the church was previously located in Rabenhorst, but had moved its seat to Rethwisch. After the Reformation the abbey's estate was transferred in 1552 to the Domanialverband (territorial union) of the local lords.

The independent municipalities of Börgerende and Rethwisch were merged on 20 June 1957 and, at the same time, transferred from the district of Rostock Land to the newly formed Bad Doberan.

The largest hotel in GDR times was the FDGB holiday home, the Hotel Waterkant. It was opened on 11 August 1976 and had 462 beds, a restaurant with 240 seats, a swimming pool and several medical facilities. The building soon stood empty after the Wende and the ruins were demolished in 2008. On its site is a new residential area with detached and terraced houses.

A relict from the East German era is the listed Baltic Sea watchtower, one of the two surviving coastal watchtowers on the Baltic Sea.

Artists working with ceramics, graphics and pictorial art display their works for tourists in the Art Barn or Kunst-Scheune.

== Rethwisch Church ==
The church dates to the early 14th century. It is triple-aisled and made of granite and fieldstone, the west tower is wooden. The oldest parts of the carved altar date to the 15th century. The ambry is in the shape of a pinnacle turret.
