= Carbäk =

- Amt
- Map of Rostock highlighting Carbäk
- Interactive map of Carbäk
- Location within Germany Location within Mecklenburg-Vorpommern
- Coordinates: 54°06′N 12°18′E
- Country: Germany
- State: Mecklenburg-Vorpommern
- District: Rostock
- Seat: Broderstorf
- Subdivisions: 4 municipalities

Area
  - Total: 68.61 km^{2} (26.49 sq mi)

Population (2025-12-31)
  - Total: 7,871
  - Density: 114.7/km^{2} (297.1/sq mi)
- Time zone: UTC+01:00 (CET)
  - Summer (DST): UTC+02:00 (CEST)
- Website: www.amtcarbaek.de

Carbäk is an Amt in the district of Rostock, in Mecklenburg-Vorpommern, Germany. The seat of the Amt is in Broderstorf.

The Amt Carbäk consists of the following municipalities:

1. Broderstorf
2. Poppendorf
3. Roggentin
4. Thulendorf
