= Carinerland =

- Municipality
- Location of Carinerland within Rostock district
- Interactive map of Carinerland
- Location within Germany Location within Mecklenburg-Vorpommern
- Coordinates: 53°59′N 11°44′E
- Country: Germany
- State: Mecklenburg-Vorpommern
- District: Rostock
- Municipal assoc.: Neubukow-Salzhaff

Government
  - Mayor: Heike Chrzan-Schmidt

Area
  - Total: 52.36 km^{2} (20.22 sq mi)
- Elevation: 60 m (200 ft)

Population (2025-12-31)
  - Total: 1,290
  - Density: 24.6/km^{2} (63.8/sq mi)
- Time zone: UTC+01:00 (CET)
  - Summer (DST): UTC+02:00 (CEST)
- Postal codes: 18233, 18236
- Dialling codes: 038294, 038297
- Vehicle registration: LRO
- Website: neubukow-salzhaff.de

Carinerland is a municipality in the Rostock district, in Mecklenburg-Vorpommern, Germany. It was established in 2004. The former municipality Kirch Mulsow was merged into Carinerland in May 2019.
