= Retschow =

- Municipality
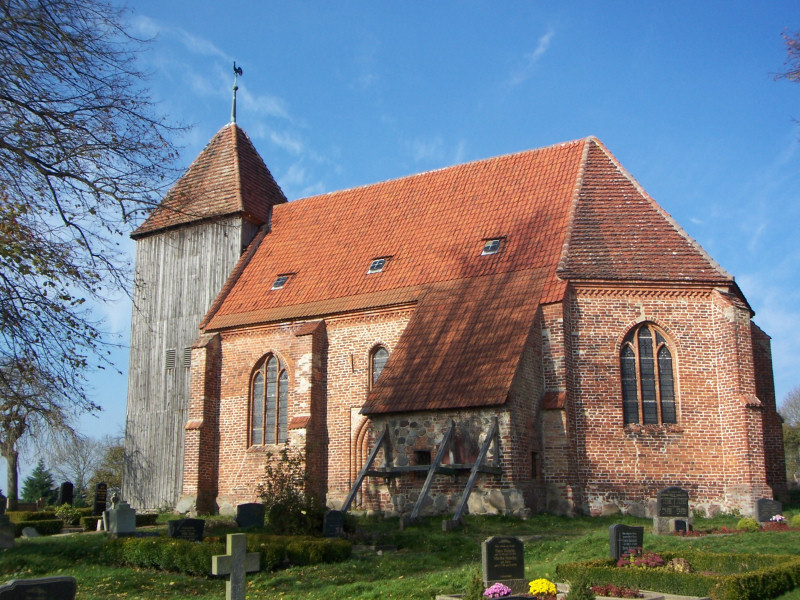
- Church

- Coat of arms

- Location of Retschow within Rostock district
- Interactive map of Retschow
- Location within Germany Location within Mecklenburg-Vorpommern
- Coordinates: 54°2′N 11°51′E
- Country: Germany
- State: Mecklenburg-Vorpommern
- District: Rostock
- Municipal assoc.: Bad Doberan-Land

Government
  - Mayor: Klaus Schoppmeyer

Area
  - Total: 18.82 km^{2} (7.27 sq mi)
- Elevation: 81 m (266 ft)

Population (2025-12-31)
  - Total: 972
  - Density: 51.6/km^{2} (134/sq mi)
- Time zone: UTC+01:00 (CET)
  - Summer (DST): UTC+02:00 (CEST)
- Postal codes: 18211
- Dialling codes: 038203, 038292
- Vehicle registration: LRO
- Website: www.doberan-land.de

Retschow is a municipality in the Rostock district, in Mecklenburg-Vorpommern, Germany.
