= Lambrechtshagen =

- Municipality
- Coat of arms

- Location of Lambrechtshagen within Rostock district
- Interactive map of Lambrechtshagen
- Location within Germany Location within Mecklenburg-Vorpommern
- Coordinates: 54°06′11″N 12°01′05″E
- Country: Germany
- State: Mecklenburg-Vorpommern
- District: Rostock
- Municipal assoc.: Warnow-West

Government
  - Mayor: Gerhard Matthies (CDU)

Area
  - Total: 13.52 km^{2} (5.22 sq mi)
- Elevation: 21 m (69 ft)

Population (2025-12-31)
  - Total: 2,860
  - Density: 212/km^{2} (548/sq mi)
- Time zone: UTC+01:00 (CET)
  - Summer (DST): UTC+02:00 (CEST)
- Postal codes: 18069
- Dialling codes: 0381, 038203, 038207
- Vehicle registration: LRO
- Website: www.amt-warnow-west.de

Lambrechtshagen is a municipality in the Rostock district, in Mecklenburg-Vorpommern, Germany.
