= Wittenbeck =

- Municipality
- Coat of arms

- Location of Wittenbeck within Rostock district
- Interactive map of Wittenbeck
- Location within Germany Location within Mecklenburg-Vorpommern
- Coordinates: 54°6′N 11°46′E
- Country: Germany
- State: Mecklenburg-Vorpommern
- District: Rostock
- Municipal assoc.: Bad Doberan-Land

Government
  - Mayor: Annette Fink

Area
  - Total: 9.93 km^{2} (3.83 sq mi)
- Elevation: 43 m (141 ft)

Population (2025-12-31)
  - Total: 883
  - Density: 88.9/km^{2} (230/sq mi)
- Time zone: UTC+01:00 (CET)
  - Summer (DST): UTC+02:00 (CEST)
- Postal codes: 18209
- Dialling codes: 038293
- Vehicle registration: LRO
- Website: www.doberan-land.de

Wittenbeck is a municipality in the Rostock district, in Mecklenburg-Vorpommern, Germany.

== Gallery ==
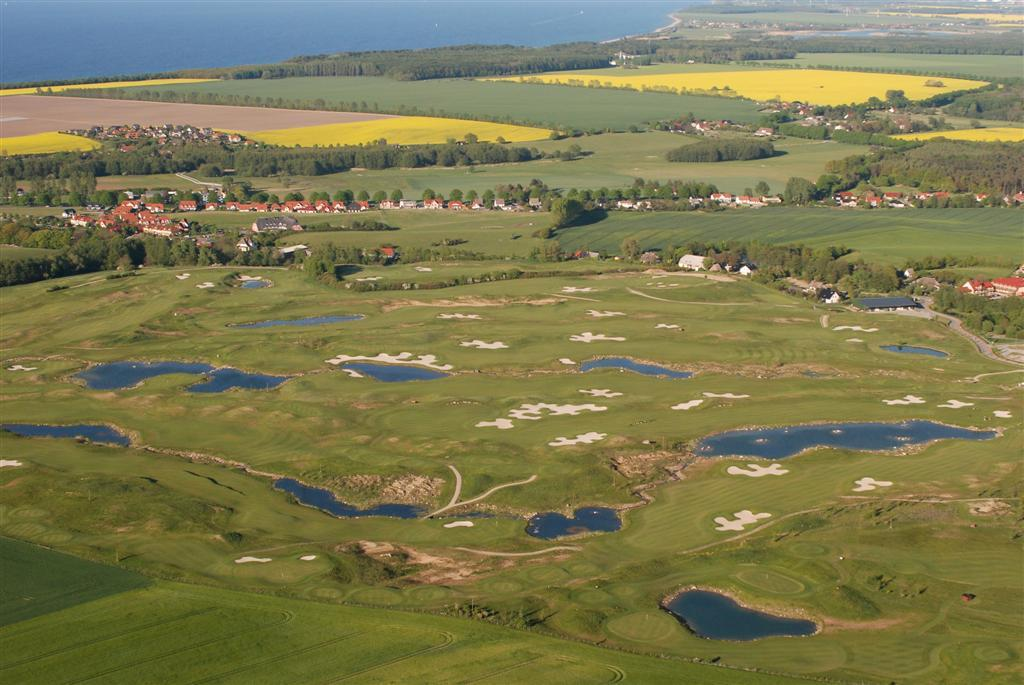
Aerial view of Golf course Golfplatz Wittenbeck at the Baltic Sea, Mecklenburg, Germany

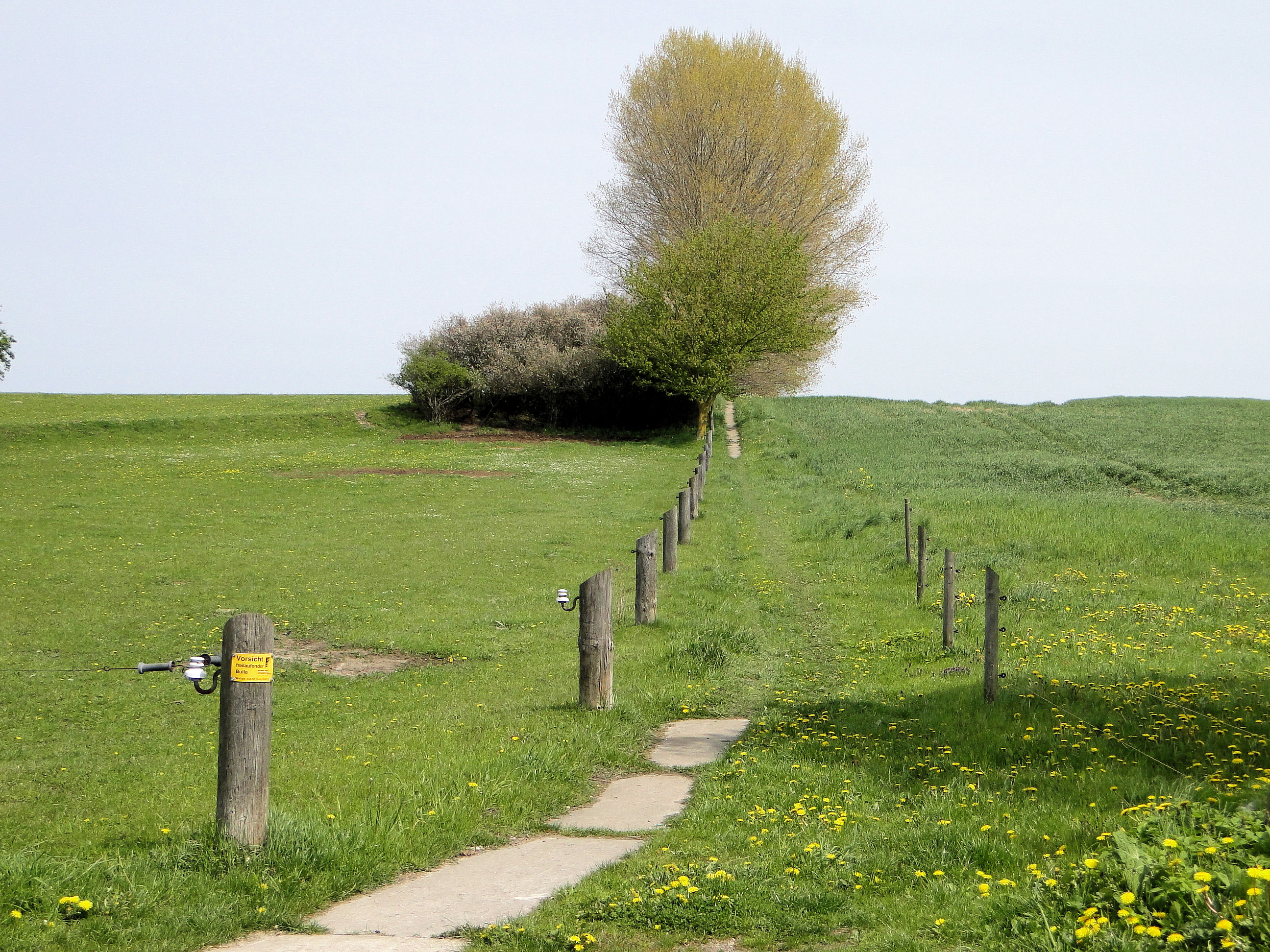
Pasture in Wittenbeck
