= Conventer See =

Lake in Germany

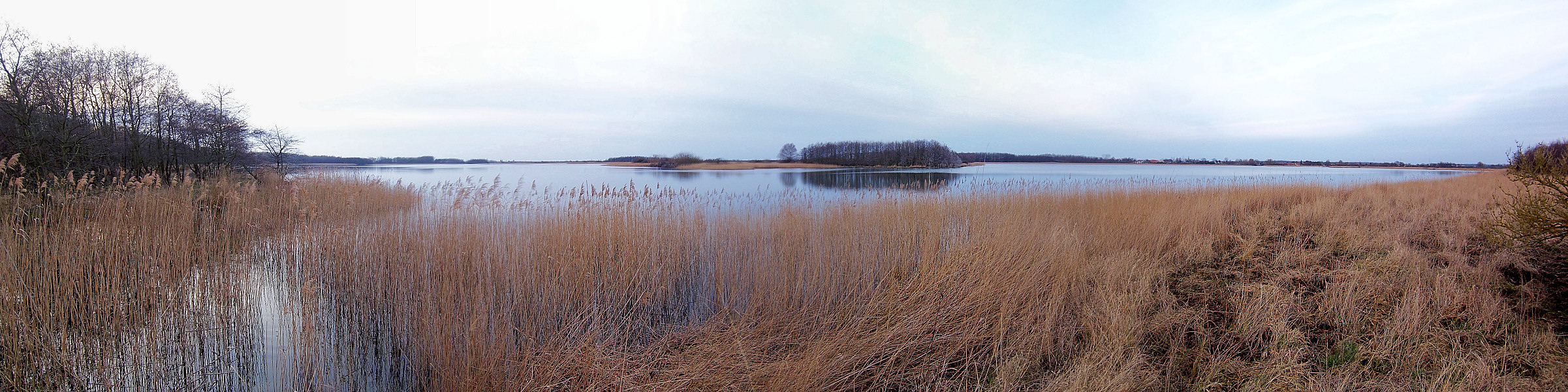

- Location within Mecklenburg-Vorpommern
- Location: Mecklenburg-Vorpommern
- Coordinates: 54°8′28″N 11°53′15″E
- Primary inflows: Stege
- Primary outflows: canal
- Basin countries: Germany
- Surface area: 91 ha (220 acres)
- Average depth: 1 m (3.3 ft)
- Max. depth: 1.7 m (5.6 ft)
- Surface elevation: −0.1 m (−0.33 ft)

Conventer See is a lake in Mecklenburg-Vorpommern, Germany. At an elevation of -0.1 m, its surface area is 0.91 km².
