= Stäbelow =

- Municipality
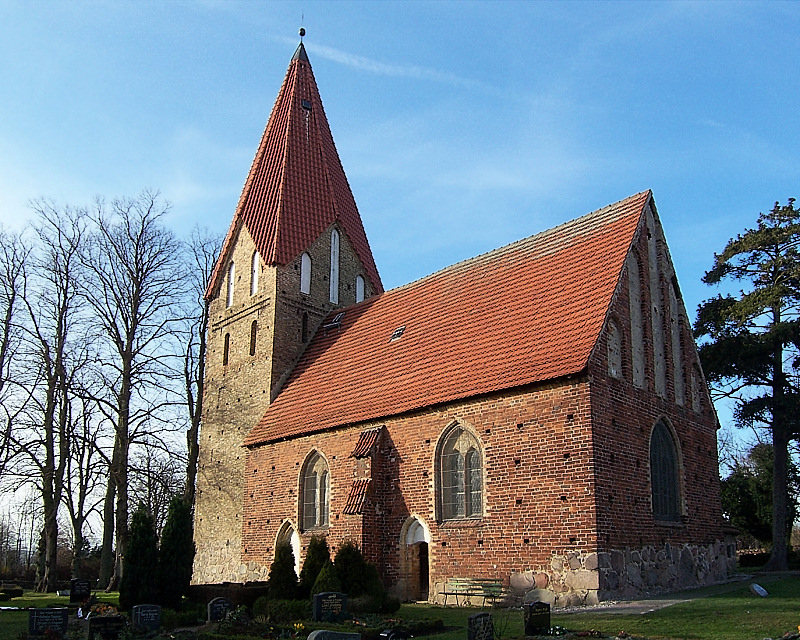
- Medieval village church in Stäbelow

- Coat of arms

- Location of Stäbelow within Rostock district
- Interactive map of Stäbelow
- Location within Germany Location within Mecklenburg-Vorpommern
- Coordinates: 54°02′26″N 12°01′18″E
- Country: Germany
- State: Mecklenburg-Vorpommern
- District: Rostock
- Municipal assoc.: Warnow-West

Government
  - Mayor: Wolfgang Bull

Area
  - Total: 14.98 km^{2} (5.78 sq mi)
- Elevation: 30 m (98 ft)

Population (2025-12-31)
  - Total: 1,355
  - Density: 90.45/km^{2} (234.3/sq mi)
- Time zone: UTC+01:00 (CET)
  - Summer (DST): UTC+02:00 (CEST)
- Postal codes: 18198
- Dialling codes: 038207
- Vehicle registration: LRO
- Website: www.amt-warnow-west.de

Stäbelow is a municipality in the Rostock district, in Mecklenburg-Vorpommern, Germany.
