= Roggentin =

- Municipality
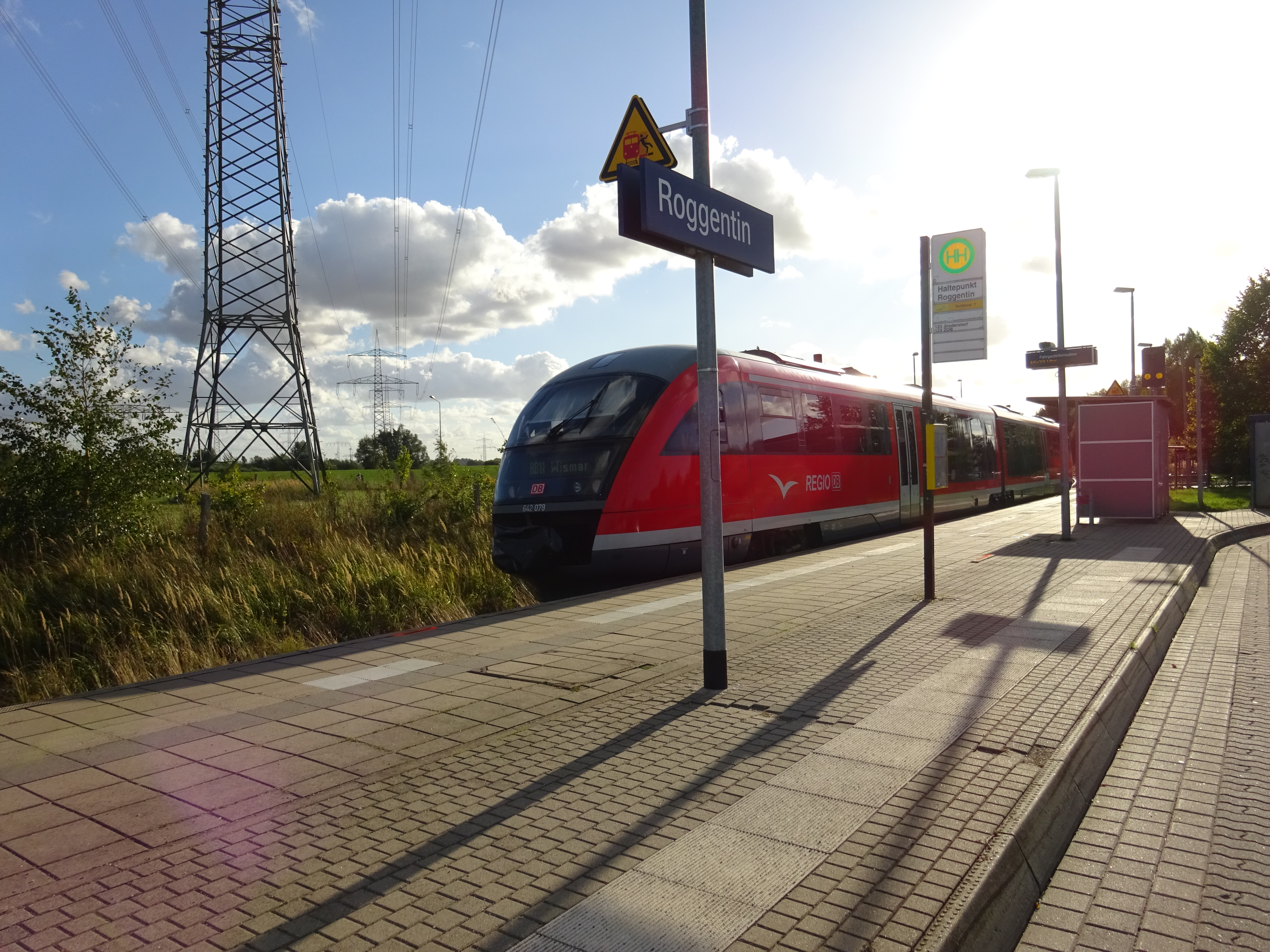
- Railway station in Roggentin

- Coat of arms

- Location of Roggentin within Rostock district
- Interactive map of Roggentin
- Location within Germany Location within Mecklenburg-Vorpommern
- Coordinates: 54°3′N 12°12′E
- Country: Germany
- State: Mecklenburg-Vorpommern
- District: Rostock
- Municipal assoc.: Carbäk

Government
  - Mayor: Erhard Bünger

Area
  - Total: 9.58 km^{2} (3.70 sq mi)
- Elevation: 34 m (112 ft)

Population (2025-12-31)
  - Total: 2,706
  - Density: 282/km^{2} (732/sq mi)
- Time zone: UTC+01:00 (CET)
  - Summer (DST): UTC+02:00 (CEST)
- Postal codes: 18184
- Dialling codes: 038204
- Vehicle registration: LRO
- Website: www.amtcarbaek.de

Roggentin is a municipality in the Rostock district, in Mecklenburg-Vorpommern, Germany.

The letter processing center for the greater Rostock area is located in Roggentin.
