= Thelkow =

- Municipality
- Location of Thelkow within Rostock district
- Interactive map of Thelkow
- Location within Germany Location within Mecklenburg-Vorpommern
- Coordinates: 54°1′N 12°33′E
- Country: Germany
- State: Mecklenburg-Vorpommern
- District: Rostock
- Municipal assoc.: Tessin

Government
  - Mayor: Gerhard Dierkes

Area
  - Total: 25.72 km^{2} (9.93 sq mi)
- Elevation: 44 m (144 ft)

Population (2025-12-31)
  - Total: 492
  - Density: 19.1/km^{2} (49.5/sq mi)
- Time zone: UTC+01:00 (CET)
  - Summer (DST): UTC+02:00 (CEST)
- Postal codes: 18195
- Dialling codes: 038205
- Vehicle registration: LRO
- Website: Amt Tessin

Thelkow is a municipality in the Rostock district, in Mecklenburg-Vorpommern, Germany. The lake Boocksee is found within its borders.

== Gallery ==
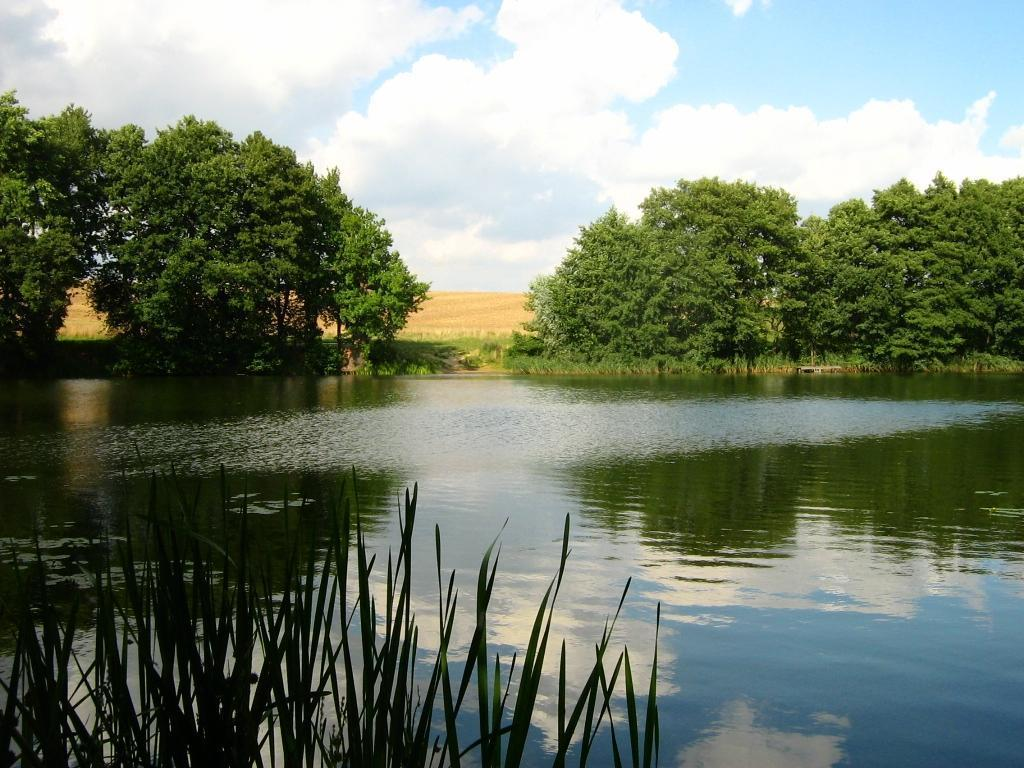
Bocksee in Thelkow

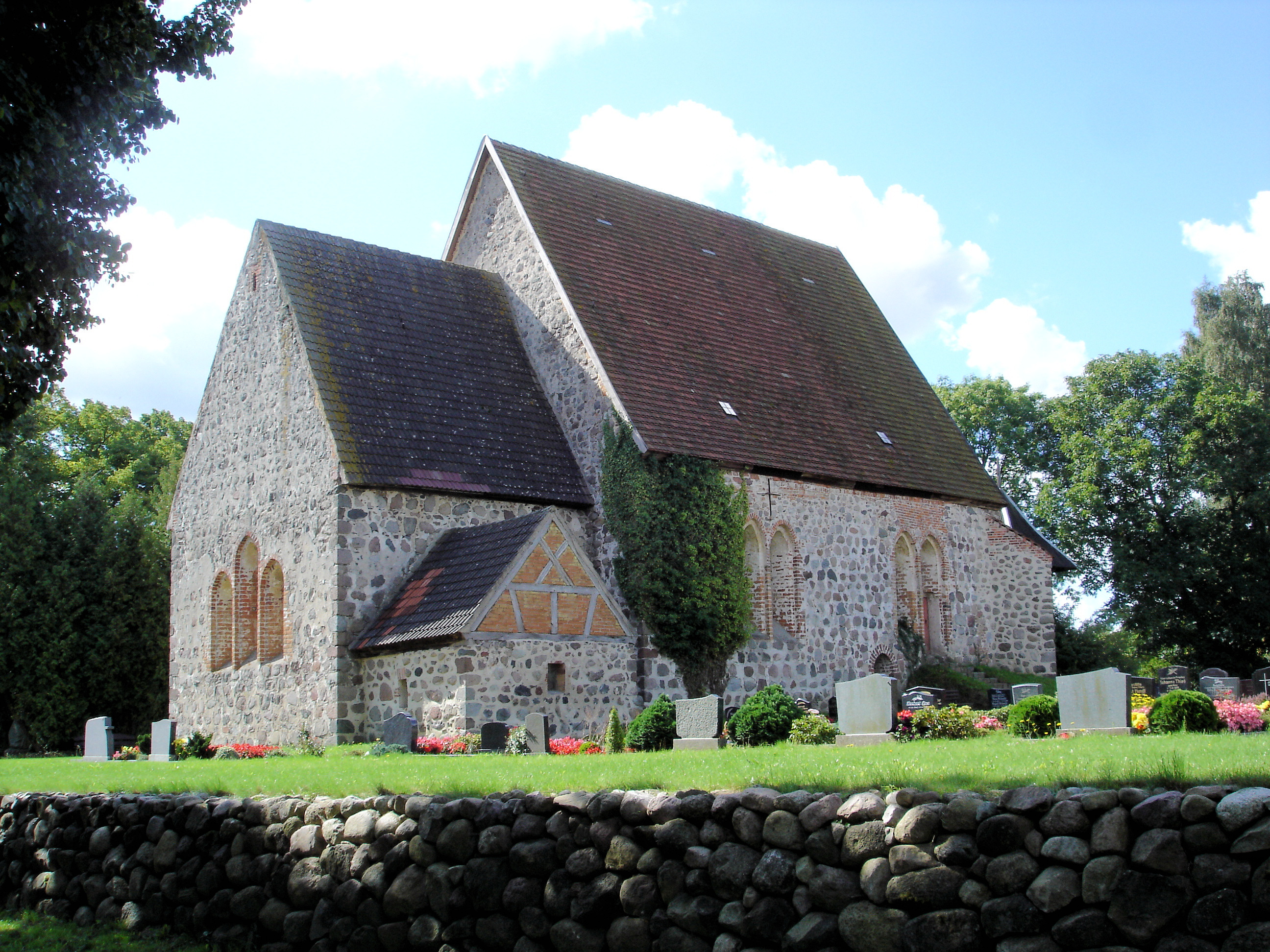
Church in Thelkow
