= Papendorf (Warnow) =

- Municipality
- Location of Papendorf within Rostock district
- Interactive map of Papendorf
- Location within Germany Location within Mecklenburg-Vorpommern
- Coordinates: 54°02′N 12°07′E
- Country: Germany
- State: Mecklenburg-Vorpommern
- District: Rostock
- Municipal assoc.: Warnow-West

Government
  - Mayor: Klaus Zeplien

Area
  - Total: 22.58 km^{2} (8.72 sq mi)
- Elevation: 10 m (33 ft)

Population (2025-12-31)
  - Total: 2,430
  - Density: 108/km^{2} (279/sq mi)
- Time zone: UTC+01:00 (CET)
  - Summer (DST): UTC+02:00 (CEST)
- Postal codes: 18059
- Dialling codes: 0381, 038207
- Vehicle registration: LRO
- Website: www.amt-warnow-west.de

Papendorf is a municipality in the Rostock district, in Mecklenburg-Vorpommern, Germany.
