= Nienhagen, Mecklenburg-Vorpommern =

Nienhagen
- Municipality
- Coat of arms

- Location of Nienhagen within Rostock district
- Interactive map of Nienhagen
- Location within Germany Location within Mecklenburg-Vorpommern
- Coordinates: 54°10′N 11°58′E
- Country: Germany
- State: Mecklenburg-Vorpommern
- District: Rostock
- Municipal assoc.: Bad Doberan-Land

Government
  - Mayor: Uwe Kahl

Area
  - Total: 5.88 km^{2} (2.27 sq mi)
- Elevation: 8 m (26 ft)

Population (2025-12-31)
  - Total: 2,221
  - Density: 378/km^{2} (978/sq mi)
- Time zone: UTC+01:00 (CET)
  - Summer (DST): UTC+02:00 (CEST)
- Postal codes: 18211
- Dialling codes: 038203
- Vehicle registration: LRO
- Website: www.doberan-land.de

Nienhagen (German pronunciation: [niːnˈhaːɡn̩]) is a municipality in the Rostock district, in Mecklenburg-Vorpommern, Germany.

== Geography ==
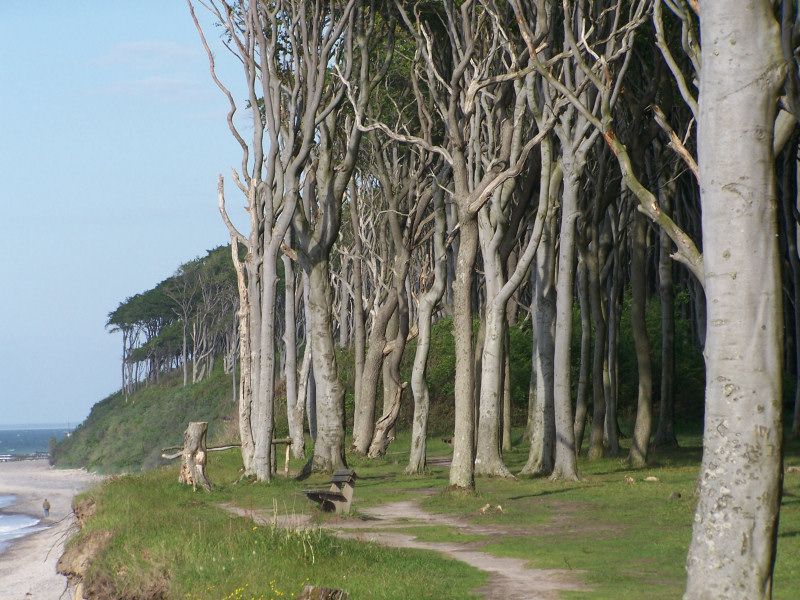
Steep sea cliffs with Ghost Wood (Gespensterwald) behind

The municipality lies on the Baltic Sea coast between the oldest German seaside spa of Heiligendamm and Warnemünde. Large parts of the municipal territory are forested. West of the village lies Nienhagen Wood (Nienhäger Holz) immediately behind the high sea cliffs which roughly measure roughly 12 m (39 ft). This mixed forest is circa 180 hectares (1.8 km^{2}) in area and is called Ghost Wood (Gespensterwald) by the locals. The origin of this description is not exactly known, but is probably derived from its coastal strip of the wood, which 1,250 m (4,100 ft) long and around 100 m (330 ft) wide, and is mainly stocked with beech and a few oaks. The beech trees, in particular, have been shaped by the sea winds, grow mainly on one side and have twisted, snake-like branches, which gives them a ghostly appearance especially at twilight and in the mist.

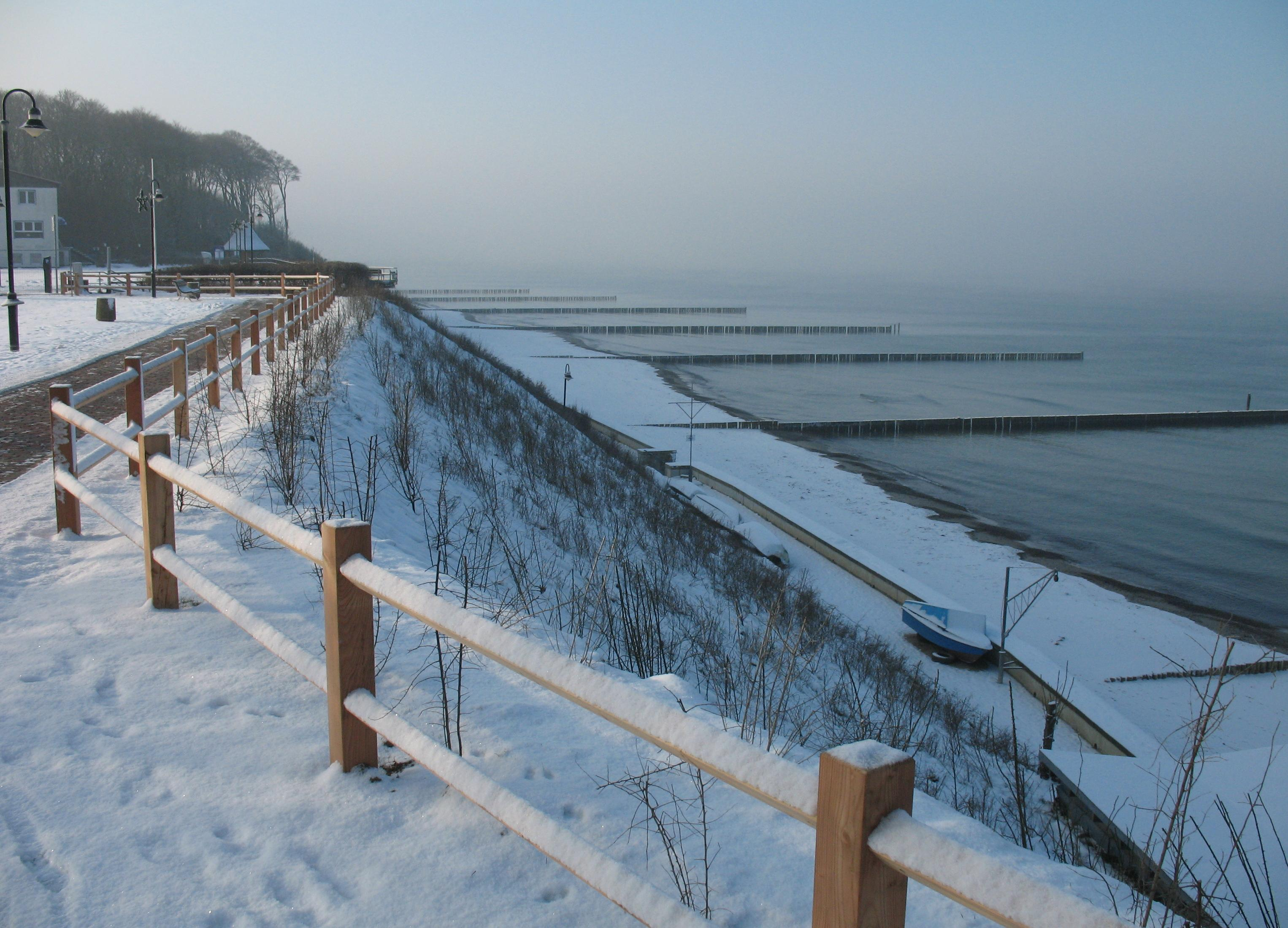
Coast in Nienhagen

A footpath with coastal views runs immediately behind the sea cliffs to Börgerende. Below the cliffs are beaches of fine sand, suitable for bathing, piles of scree and several large glacial erratics. A mile off the coast in the Baltic Sea is Nienhagen Artificial Reef which is used for research.
