= Hohenfelde, Mecklenburg-Vorpommern =

Hohenfelde
- Municipality
- Coat of arms

- Location of Hohenfelde within Rostock district
- Interactive map of Hohenfelde
- Location within Germany Location within Mecklenburg-Vorpommern
- Coordinates: 54°4′N 11°55′E
- Country: Germany
- State: Mecklenburg-Vorpommern
- District: Rostock
- Municipal assoc.: Bad Doberan-Land

Government
  - Mayor: Karlheinz Siewert

Area
  - Total: 9.51 km^{2} (3.67 sq mi)
- Elevation: 49 m (161 ft)

Population (2025-12-31)
  - Total: 744
  - Density: 78.2/km^{2} (203/sq mi)
- Time zone: UTC+01:00 (CET)
  - Summer (DST): UTC+02:00 (CEST)
- Postal codes: 18209
- Dialling codes: 038203
- Vehicle registration: LRO (old: DBR)
- Website: www.hohenfelde.net

Hohenfelde (German pronunciation: [hoːənˈfɛldə]) is a municipality in the Rostock district, in Mecklenburg-Vorpommern, Germany.
