= Blankenhagen =

- Municipality
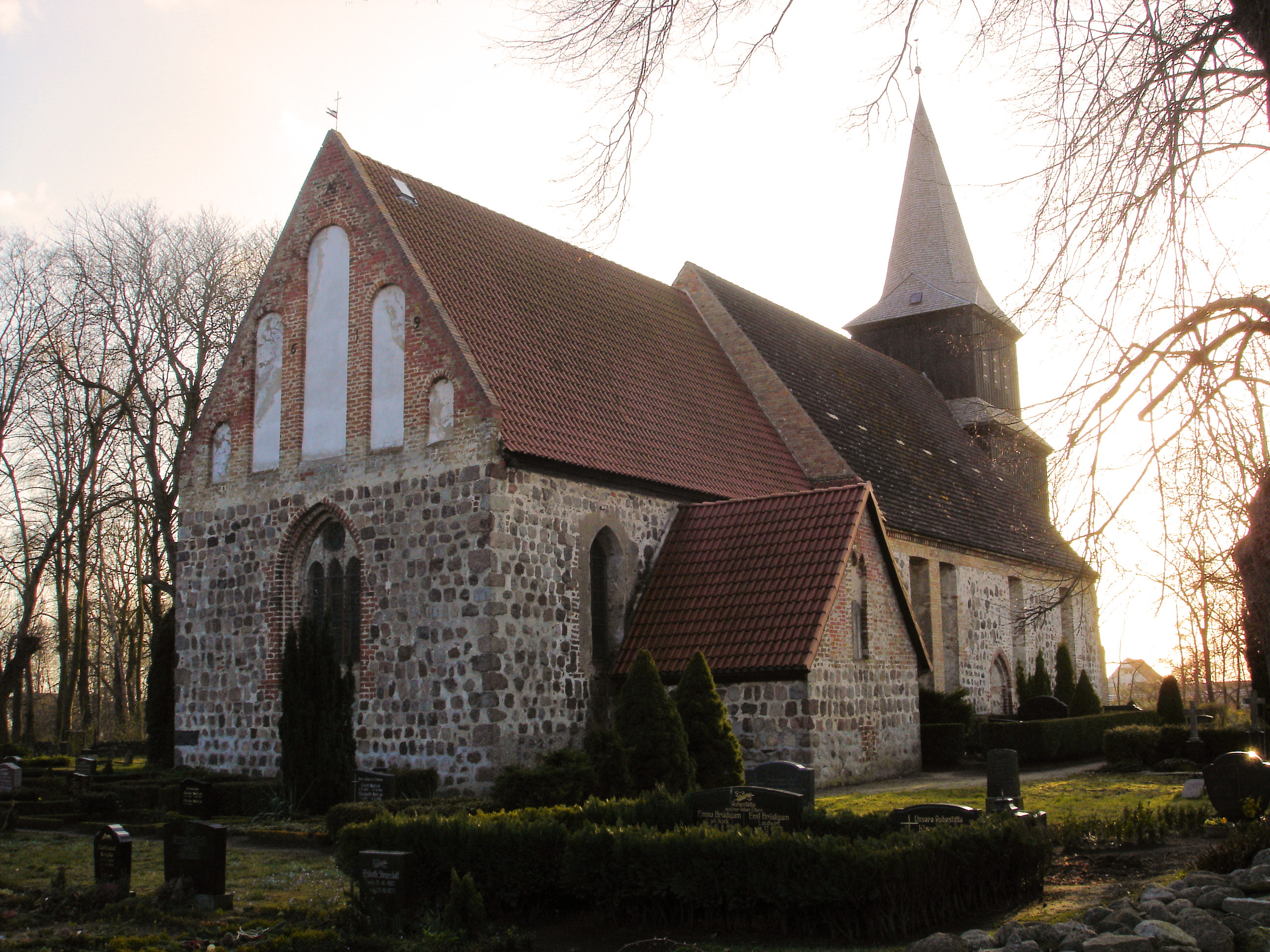
- Medieval village church in Blankenhagen

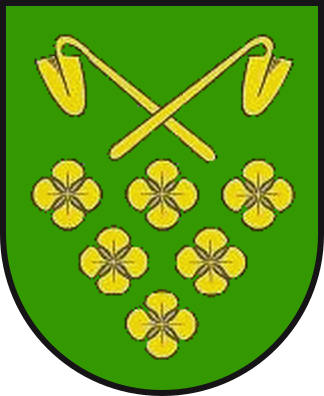
- Coat of arms

- Location of Blankenhagen within Rostock district
- Interactive map of Blankenhagen
- Location within Germany Location within Mecklenburg-Vorpommern
- Coordinates: 54°10′12″N 12°21′33″E
- Country: Germany
- State: Mecklenburg-Vorpommern
- District: Rostock
- Municipal assoc.: Rostocker Heide

Government
  - Mayor: Detlef Kröger

Area
  - Total: 25.25 km^{2} (9.75 sq mi)
- Elevation: 37 m (121 ft)

Population (2025-12-31)
  - Total: 1,104
  - Density: 43.72/km^{2} (113.2/sq mi)
- Time zone: UTC+01:00 (CET)
  - Summer (DST): UTC+02:00 (CEST)
- Postal codes: 18182
- Dialling codes: 038201
- Vehicle registration: LRO
- Website: www.amt-rostocker-heide.de

Blankenhagen is a municipality in the Rostock district, in Mecklenburg-Vorpommern, Germany.
