= Kritzmow =

- Municipality
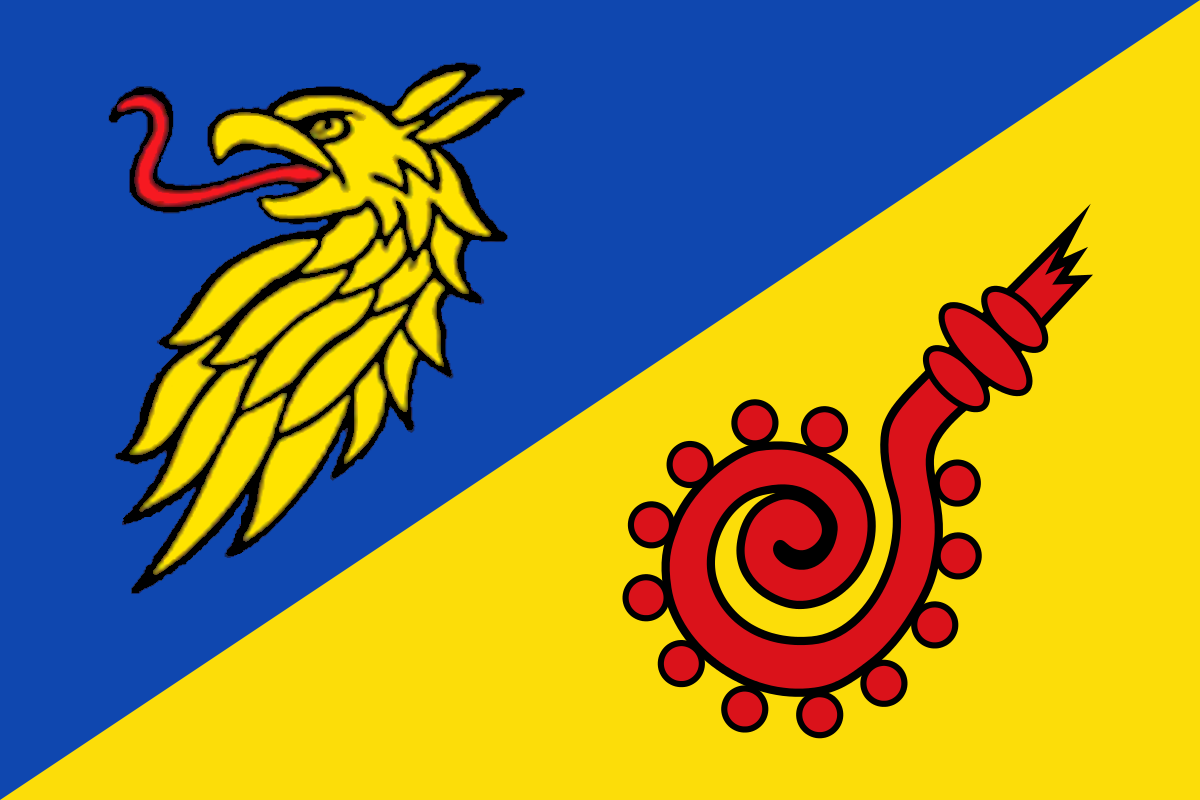
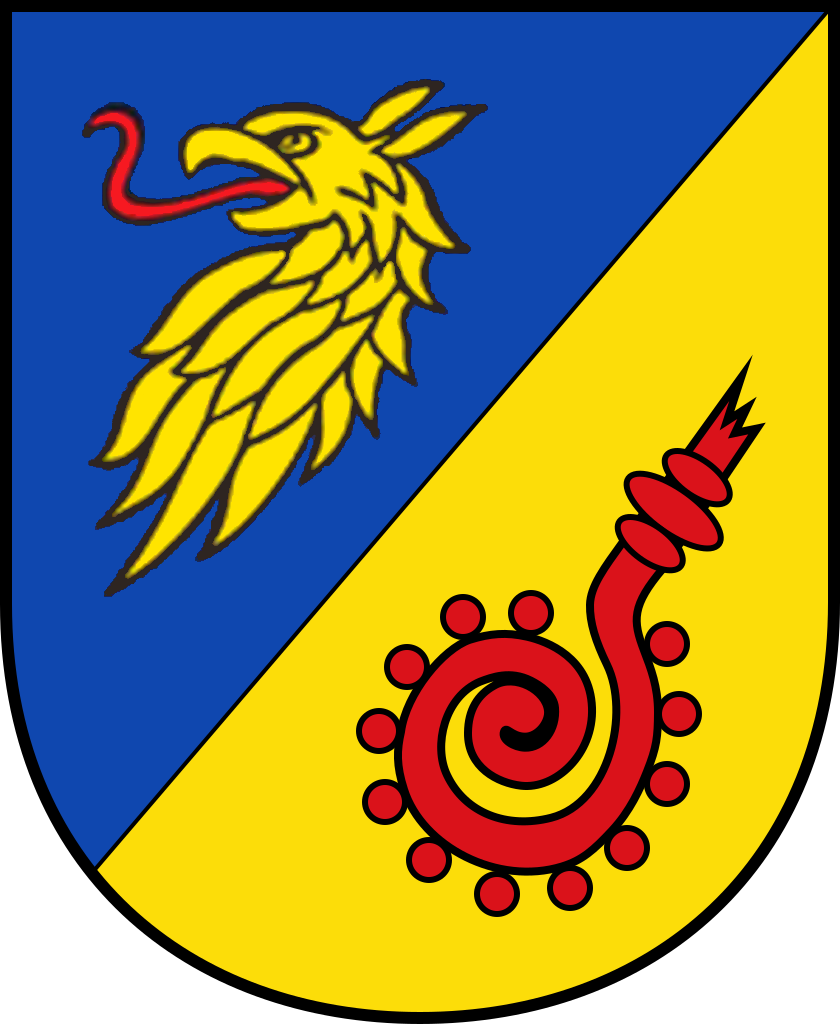
- Flag Coat of arms

- Location of Kritzmow within Rostock district
- Interactive map of Kritzmow
- Location within Germany Location within Mecklenburg-Vorpommern
- Coordinates: 54°03′N 12°03′E
- Country: Germany
- State: Mecklenburg-Vorpommern
- District: Rostock
- Municipal assoc.: Warnow-West

Government
  - Mayor: Thomas Knopp

Area
  - Total: 14.81 km^{2} (5.72 sq mi)
- Elevation: 49 m (161 ft)

Population (2025-12-31)
  - Total: 3,931
  - Density: 265.4/km^{2} (687.5/sq mi)
- Time zone: UTC+01:00 (CET)
  - Summer (DST): UTC+02:00 (CEST)
- Postal codes: 18198
- Dialling codes: 0381, 038207
- Vehicle registration: LRO
- Website: www.amt-warnow-west.de

Kritzmow is a municipality in the Rostock district, in Mecklenburg-Vorpommern, Germany.
