= Admannshagen-Bargeshagen =

- Municipality
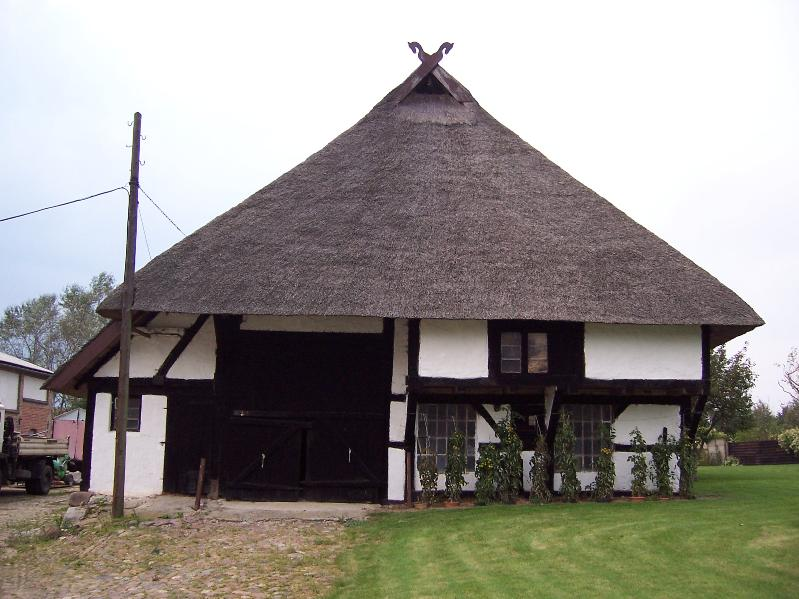

- Location of Admannshagen-Bargeshagen within Rostock district
- Interactive map of Admannshagen-Bargeshagen
- Location within Germany Location within Mecklenburg-Vorpommern
- Coordinates: 54°7′N 11°59′E
- Country: Germany
- State: Mecklenburg-Vorpommern
- District: Rostock
- Municipal assoc.: Bad Doberan-Land

Government
  - Mayor: Klaus-Peter Wiendieck (CDU)

Area
  - Total: 15.68 km^{2} (6.05 sq mi)
- Elevation: 10 m (33 ft)

Population (2025-12-31)
  - Total: 2,899
  - Density: 184.9/km^{2} (478.9/sq mi)
- Time zone: UTC+01:00 (CET)
  - Summer (DST): UTC+02:00 (CEST)
- Postal codes: 18211
- Dialling codes: 038203
- Vehicle registration: LRO
- Website: www.doberan-land.de

Admannshagen-Bargeshagen is a municipality in the Rostock district, in Mecklenburg-Vorpommern, Germany.
