= Broderstorf =

- Municipality
- Coat of arms

- Location of Broderstorf within Rostock district
- Interactive map of Broderstorf
- Location within Germany Location within Mecklenburg-Vorpommern
- Coordinates: 54°04′N 12°15′E
- Country: Germany
- State: Mecklenburg-Vorpommern
- District: Rostock
- Municipal assoc.: Carbäk

Government
  - Mayor: Hanns Lange

Area
  - Total: 34.07 km^{2} (13.15 sq mi)
- Elevation: 40 m (130 ft)

Population (2025-12-31)
  - Total: 3,756
  - Density: 110.2/km^{2} (285.5/sq mi)
- Time zone: UTC+01:00 (CET)
  - Summer (DST): UTC+02:00 (CEST)
- Postal codes: 18184
- Dialling codes: 038204
- Vehicle registration: LRO
- Website: www.amtcarbaek.de

Broderstorf is a municipality in the Rostock district, in Mecklenburg-Vorpommern, Germany.
