= Rövershagen station =

Railway station in Rövershagen, Germany

Rövershagen
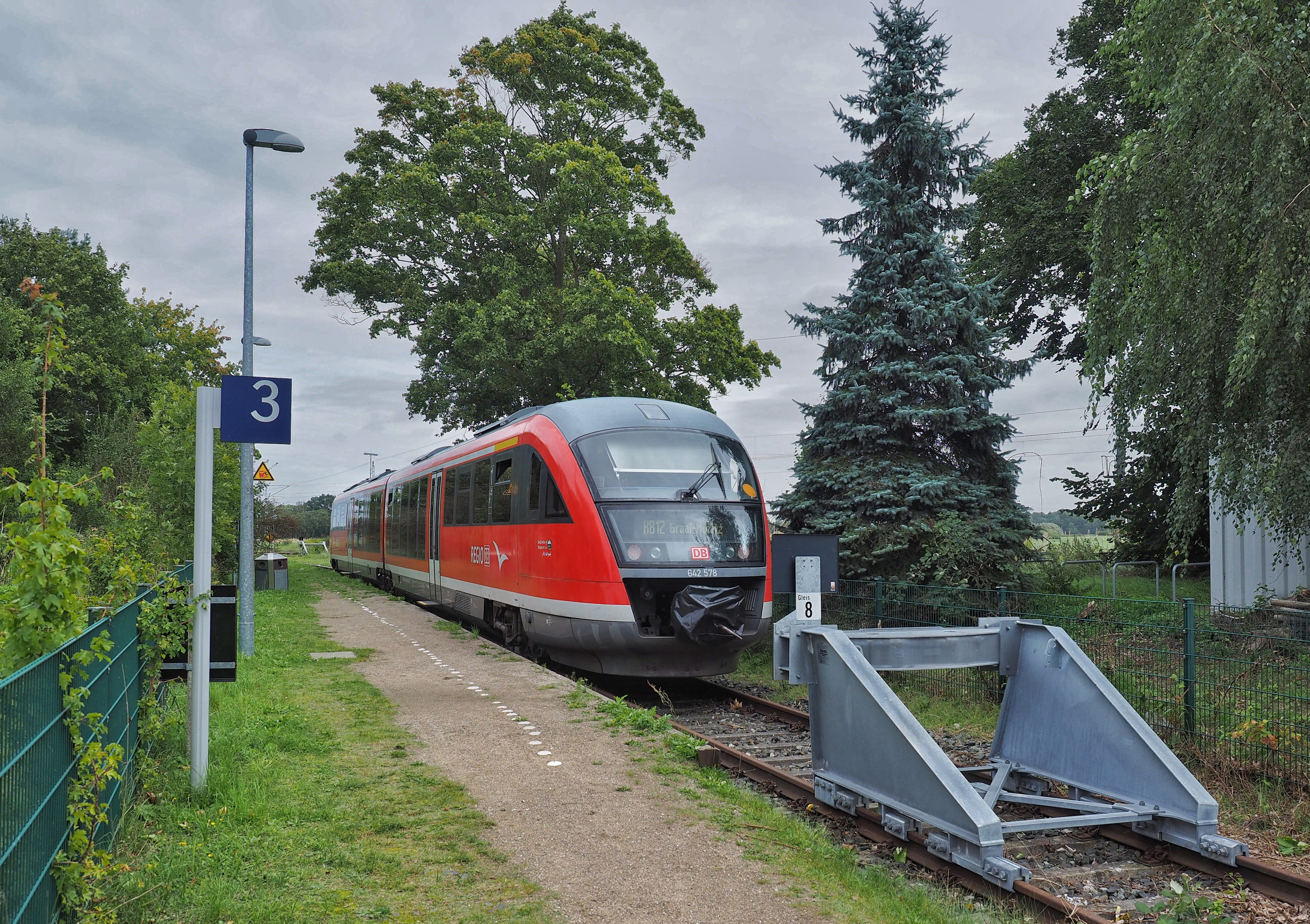
- 2021

General information
- Location: Bahnhofstraße 10; 18182 Rövershagen, MV; Germany
- Coordinates: 54.1756°N 12.2472°E
- Owner: DB Netz
- Operator: DB Station&Service
- Lines: Stralsund–Rostock railway Mecklenburg Spa Railway
- Platforms: 1 island platform, 1 side platform
- Tracks: 3
- Train operators: DB Regio Nordost, Ostdeutsche Eisenbahn

Other information
- Station code: 5406
- DS100 code: WRV
- IBNR: 8010300
- Category: 5
- Website: www.bahnhof.de

History
- Opened: 1 July 1888; 138 years ago
- Electrified: 2 June 1991; 35 years ago

Services
Preceding station	Ostdeutsche Eisenbahn	Following station
Rostock Hbf Terminus	RE 9	Gelbensande towards Sassnitz or Ostseebad Binz
Rostock Hbf Terminus	RE 10	Gelbensande towards Pasewalk
Preceding station	DB Regio Nordost	Following station
Rövershagen Karls Erlebnisdorf towards Rostock Hbf	RB 12	Rostock-Torfbrücke towards Graal-Müritz
Rövershagen Karls Erlebnisdorf towards Rostock Hbf	RB 12	Gelbensande towards Ribnitz-Damgarten West
Location

Rövershagen station is a railway station in the municipality of Rövershagen, Mecklenburg-Vorpommern, Germany.

== Train Services ==
The station is served by the following services:

Line	Route		Frequency
RE 9	Ostseebad Binz – Prora –	Lietzow (Rügen) – Bergen auf Rügen – Samtens – Stralsund – Velgast – Ribnitz-Damgarten West – Rövershagen – Rostock	Every 2 hours
RE 9	Sassnitz – Sagard –	Lietzow (Rügen) – Bergen auf Rügen – Samtens – Stralsund – Velgast – Ribnitz-Damgarten West – Rövershagen – Rostock	Every 2 hours
RE 10	Rostock – Rövershagen – Velgast – Stralsund – Greifswald – Züssow – Pasewalk		2 train pairs, Mon–Fri
RB 12	Rostock – Rövershagen –	Rostock-Torfbrücke – Graal-Müritz	every hour
RB 12	Rostock – Rövershagen –	Ribnitz-Damgarten West	2 train pairs
