= Mecklenburgische Seenplatte II – Landkreis Rostock III =

Federal electoral district of Germany

Coordinates: 53°38′19″N 12°41′07″E

17 Mecklenburgische Seenplatte II – Landkreis Rostock III
- Electoral district for the Bundestag
- Mecklenburgische Seenplatte II – Landkreis Rostock III in 2025
- State: Mecklenburg-Vorpommern
- Population: 251,300 (2019)
- Electorate: 209,348 (2021)
- Major settlements: Güstrow; Waren (Müritz); Neustrelitz
- Area: 6,277.7 km^{2}

Current electoral district
- Created: 2002
- Party: AfD
- Member: Ulrike Schielke-Ziesing
- Elected: 2025

Mecklenburgische Seenplatte II – Landkreis Rostock III (English: Mecklenburg Lake District II - Rostock District III) is an electoral constituency (German: Wahlkreis) represented in the Bundestag. It elects one member via first-past-the-post voting. Under the current constituency numbering system, it is designated as constituency 17. It is located in central Mecklenburg-Vorpommern, comprising most of the Mecklenburgische Seenplatte district and the southern part of the Landkreis Rostock district.

Mecklenburgische Seenplatte II – Landkreis Rostock III was created for the 2002 federal election. From 2021 to 2025, it was represented by Johannes Arlt of the Social Democratic Party (SPD). Since 2025 it has been represented by Ulrike Schielke-Ziesing of AfD.

== Geography ==
Mecklenburgische Seenplatte II – Landkreis Rostock III is located in central Mecklenburg-Vorpommern. As of the 2021 federal election, it comprises all of the Mecklenburgische Seenplatte district with the exception of the municipalities of Feldberger Seenlandschaft and Neubrandenburg and the Ämter of Friedland, Neverin, Stargarder Land, and Woldegk, as well as the municipalities of Güstrow and Teterow and the Ämter of Bützow Land, Gnoien, Güstrow-Land, Krakow am See, Laage, and Mecklenburgische Schweiz from the Landkreis Rostock district. It is the largest federal constituency by area in Germany.

== History ==
Mecklenburgische Seenplatte II – Landkreis Rostock III was created in 2002, then known as Bad Doberan – Güstrow – Müritz. It contained parts of the abolished constituencies of Wismar – Gadebusch – Grevesmühlen – Doberan – Bützow, Güstrow – Sternberg – Lübz – Parchim – Ludwigslust, Rostock-Land – Ribnitz-Damgarten – Teterow – Malchin, Neubrandenburg – Altentreptow – Waren – Röbel, and Neustrelitz – Strasburg – Pasewalk – Ueckermünde – Anklam. Originally, it comprised the now-abolished districts of Güstrow, Müritz, and Bad Doberan. In the 2005 election, it lost the municipalities of Graal-Müritz and Sanitz and the Ämter of Carbäk, Rostocker Heide, and Tessin from the Bad Doberan district. In the 2013 election, it lost the remainder of its territory from the former Bad Doberan district, while expanding to cover most of the newly-formed Mecklenburgische Seenplatte district. It also acquired its current name.

Election	No.	Name	Borders
2002	17	Bad Doberan – Güstrow – Müritz	Güstrow district; Müritz district; Bad Doberan district
2005	17	Bad Doberan – Güstrow – Müritz	Güstrow district; Müritz district; Bad Doberan district (excluding Graal-Müritz and Sanitz municipalities and Carbäk Amt, Rostocker Heide Amt, and Tessin Amt)
2009	17	Bad Doberan – Güstrow – Müritz	Güstrow district; Müritz district; Bad Doberan district (excluding Graal-Müritz and Sanitz municipalities and Carbäk Amt, Rostocker Heide Amt, and Tessin Amt)
2013	17	Mecklenburgische Seenplatte II – Landkreis Rostock III	Mecklenburgische Seenplatte district (excluding Feldberger Seenlandschaft and Neubrandenburg municipalities and Friedland Amt, Neverin Amt, Stargarder Land Amt, and Woldegk Amt); Landkreis Rostock district (only Güstrow and Teterow municipalities and Bützow Land Amt, Gnoien Amt, Güstrow-Land Amt, Krakow am See Amt, Laage Amt, and Mecklenburgische Schweiz Amt)
2017	17	Mecklenburgische Seenplatte II – Landkreis Rostock III	Mecklenburgische Seenplatte district (excluding Feldberger Seenlandschaft and Neubrandenburg municipalities and Friedland Amt, Neverin Amt, Stargarder Land Amt, and Woldegk Amt); Landkreis Rostock district (only Güstrow and Teterow municipalities and Bützow Land Amt, Gnoien Amt, Güstrow-Land Amt, Krakow am See Amt, Laage Amt, and Mecklenburgische Schweiz Amt)
2021	17	Mecklenburgische Seenplatte II – Landkreis Rostock III	Mecklenburgische Seenplatte district (excluding Feldberger Seenlandschaft and Neubrandenburg municipalities and Friedland Amt, Neverin Amt, Stargarder Land Amt, and Woldegk Amt); Landkreis Rostock district (only Güstrow and Teterow municipalities and Bützow Land Amt, Gnoien Amt, Güstrow-Land Amt, Krakow am See Amt, Laage Amt, and Mecklenburgische Schweiz Amt)
2025	17	Mecklenburgische Seenplatte II – Landkreis Rostock III	Mecklenburgische Seenplatte district (excluding Feldberger Seenlandschaft and Neubrandenburg municipalities and Friedland Amt, Neverin Amt, Stargarder Land Amt, and Woldegk Amt); Landkreis Rostock district (only Güstrow and Teterow municipalities and Bützow Land Amt, Gnoien Amt, Güstrow-Land Amt, Krakow am See Amt, Laage Amt, and Mecklenburgische Schweiz Amt)

== Members ==
The constituency was held by the Social Democratic Party (SPD) from its creation in 2002 until 2009, during which time it was represented by Dirk Manzewski. It was won by the Christian Democratic Union (CDU) in 2009, and represented by Eckhardt Rehberg. He was re-elected in 2013 and 2017. The constituency was won by Johannes Arlt in 2021 and in 2025 by Ulrike Schielke-Ziesing.

Election	Member	Party	%
2002	Dirk Manzewski	SPD	44.5
2005	Dirk Manzewski	SPD	33.6
2009	Eckhardt Rehberg	CDU	34.7
2013	Eckhardt Rehberg	CDU	47.0
2017	Eckhardt Rehberg	CDU	37.6
2021	Johannes Arlt	SPD	31.1
2025	Ulrike Schielke-Ziesing	AfD	41.1

== Election results ==
=== 2025 election ===
Federal election (2025): Mecklenburgische Seenplatte II – Landkreis Rostock III
Notes:	Blue background denotes the winner of the electorate vote. Pink background denotes a candidate elected from their party list. Yellow background denotes an electorate win by a list member, or other incumbent. A ✓ or ✗ denotes status of any incumbent, win or lose respectively.						
Party	Candidate	Votes	%	±%	Party votes	%	±%
AfD	Ulrike Schielke-Ziesing	65,035	41.1	▲19.5	63,396	39.8	▲18.9
SPD	✗ Johannes Arlt	31,002	19.6	▼11.5	18,162	11.4	▼18.5
CDU	Stephan Bunge	30,808	19.4	▼1.9	28,482	17.9	▼0.9
BSW					17,740	11.1	New
Left	Niklas Henenkamp	16,952	10.7	▲0.4	16,377	10.3	0.0
FDP	Christoph Stitz	4,314	2.7	▼4.3	4,632	2.9	▼4.6
FW	Sabine Schröter	3,582	2.3	▼0.8	1,630	1.0	▼0.7
Greens	Jana Klinkenberg	3,370	2.1	▼3.3	5,363	3.4	▼1.7
Tierschutzpartei					1,973	1.2	▼0.5
BD	Nadine Warncke	3,364	2.1	New	724	0.5	New
Volt					584	0.4	▲0.2
MLPD					96	0.1	▼0.1
Informal votes		2,186			1,454		
Total valid votes		158,427			159,159		
Turnout		160,613	78.5	▲9.9			
AfD gain from SPD	Majority	34,033	21.5	N/A			

=== 2021 election ===
Federal election (2021): Mecklenburgische Seenplatte II – Landkreis Rostock III
Notes:	Blue background denotes the winner of the electorate vote. Pink background denotes a candidate elected from their party list. Yellow background denotes an electorate win by a list member, or other incumbent. A ✓ or ✗ denotes status of any incumbent, win or lose respectively.						
Party	Candidate	Votes	%	±%	Party votes	%	±%
SPD	Johannes Arlt	43,730	31.1	▲15.4	42,049	29.9	▲15.4
AfD	Ulrike Schielke-Ziesing	30,320	21.6	▲3.2	29,421	20.9	▲1.7
CDU	Stephan Bunge	29,950	21.3	▼16.3	26,402	18.8	▼17.1
Left	Amina Kanew	14,494	10.3	▼7.1	14,434	10.3	▼6.7
FDP	Tobias Schubert	9,825	7.0	▲2.3	10,609	7.5	▲1.8
Greens	Falk Jagszent	7,573	5.4	▲2.1	7,179	5.1	▲1.9
FW	Klaus-Dieter Gabbert	4,264	3.0	▲1.4	2,455	1.7	▲0.7
Tierschutzpartei					2,468	1.8	▲0.6
dieBasis					2,305	1.6	
PARTEI					984	0.7	0.0
NPD					939	0.7	▼0.5
Pirates					443	0.3	
Team Todenhöfer					267	0.2	
ÖDP					245	0.2	▲0.1
Volt					210	0.1	
MLPD	Lena Goltz	445	0.3	0.0	163	0.1	0.0
Humanists					140	0.1	
DKP					85	0.1	
Informal votes		3,021			2,824		
Total valid votes		140,601			140,798		
Turnout		143,622	68.6	▲0.6			
SPD gain from CDU	Majority	13,410	9.5				

=== 2017 election ===
Federal election (2017): Mecklenburgische Seenplatte II – Landkreis Rostock III
Notes:	Blue background denotes the winner of the electorate vote. Pink background denotes a candidate elected from their party list. Yellow background denotes an electorate win by a list member, or other incumbent. A ✓ or ✗ denotes status of any incumbent, win or lose respectively.						
Party	Candidate	Votes	%	±%	Party votes	%	±%
CDU	✓ Eckhardt Rehberg	53,538	37.6	▼9.4	51,007	35.8	▼9.3
AfD	Ulrike Schielke-Ziesing	26,199	18.4		27,382	19.2	▲14.1
Left	Heidrun Bluhm	24,728	17.4	▼5.3	24,102	16.9	▼4.6
SPD	Jeannine Pflugradt	22,401	15.7	▼3.0	20,594	14.5	▼2.7
FDP	Sascha Zimmermann	6,633	4.7	▲3.2	8,198	5.8	▲3.7
Greens	Monika Göpper	4,739	3.3	▲0.3	4,592	3.2	▼0.1
FW	Christian Ronge	2,327	1.6	▲0.1	1,423	1.0	0.0
Tierschutzpartei					1,626	1.1	
NPD	David Petereit	1,388	1.0	▼2.2	1,643	1.2	▼1.5
PARTEI					1,034	0.7	
BGE					459	0.3	
MLPD	Barbara Schilke	423	0.3	▼0.1	220	0.2	0.0
ÖDP					161	0.1	
Informal votes		1,863			1,798		
Total valid votes		142,376			142,441		
Turnout		144,239	68.0	▲5.4			
CDU hold	Majority	27,339	19.2	▼5.1			

=== 2013 election ===
Federal election (2013): Mecklenburgische Seenplatte II – Landkreis Rostock III
Notes:	Blue background denotes the winner of the electorate vote. Pink background denotes a candidate elected from their party list. Yellow background denotes an electorate win by a list member, or other incumbent. A ✓ or ✗ denotes status of any incumbent, win or lose respectively.						
Party	Candidate	Votes	%	±%	Party votes	%	±%
CDU	✓ Eckhardt Rehberg	62,852	47.0	▲11.9	60,407	45.1	▲10.4
Left	Heidrun Bluhm	30,284	22.7	▼7.6	28,819	21.5	▼8.2
SPD	Jeannine Pflugradt	25,029	18.7	▼0.3	22,981	17.2	▲0.9
AfD					6,806	5.1	
NPD	Hannes Welchar	4,243	3.2	▼0.3	3,584	2.7	▼0.7
Greens	Kerstin Felgner	4,083	3.1	▼0.8	4,474	3.3	▼1.1
Pirates	Harro Glienke	2,653	2.0		2,112	1.6	▼0.2
FW	Hartwig Kurth	2,024	1.5		1,402	1.0	
FDP	Dietrich-Eckard Krause	1,983	1.5	▼5.7	2,771	2.1	▼7.3
MLPD	Barbara Schilke	491	0.4		233	0.2	0.0
PRO					260	0.2	
REP					120	0.1	▼0.1
Informal votes		3,195			2,868		
Total valid votes		133,642			133,969		
Turnout		136,837	62.6	▲2.3			
CDU hold	Majority	32,568	24.3	▲16.9			

=== 2009 election ===
Federal election (2009): Bad Doberan – Güstrow – Müritz
Notes:	Blue background denotes the winner of the electorate vote. Pink background denotes a candidate elected from their party list. Yellow background denotes an electorate win by a list member, or other incumbent. A ✓ or ✗ denotes status of any incumbent, win or lose respectively.						
Party	Candidate	Votes	%	±%	Party votes	%	±%
CDU	Eckhardt Rehberg	45,176	34.7	▲2.6	66,654	34.2	▲3.7
Left	Heidrun Bluhm	35,601	27.3	▲4.3	36,412	27.9	▲4.8
SPD	✗ Dirk Manzewski	28,457	21.8	▼11.7	22,778	17.4	▼14.2
FDP	Toralf Schnur	9,485	7.3	▲3.4	13,038	10.0	▲3.7
Greens	Steffen Marklein	6,255	4.8	▲2.0	6,762	5.2	▲1.2
NPD	Dirk Susemihl	4,118	3.2	▼0.3	3,869	3.0	▼0.4
Pirates					2,525	1.9	
Independent	Karl Heinz Lüder	647	0.5				
ÖDP	Achim Klein	523	0.4				
MLPD					277	0.2	▼0.1
REP					237	0.2	
Informal votes		2,616			2,326		
Total valid votes		130,262			130,552		
Turnout		132,878	62.8	▼9.0			
CDU gain from SPD	Majority	9,575	7.4				

=== 2005 election ===
Federal election (2005):Bad Doberan - Güstrow - Müritz
Notes:	Blue background denotes the winner of the electorate vote. Pink background denotes a candidate elected from their party list. Yellow background denotes an electorate win by a list member, or other incumbent. A ✓ or ✗ denotes status of any incumbent, win or lose respectively.						
Party	Candidate	Votes	%	±%	Party votes	%	±%
SPD	✓ Dirk Manzewski	50,836	33.6	▼11.1	49,324	37.3	▼9.6
CDU	Werner Kuhn	48,653	32.1	▲1.4	46,295	30.5	▲0.2
Left	Helmut Holter	34,824	23.0	▲7.9	35,020	23.1	▲7.5
FDP	Toralf Schnur	5,820	3.8	▼1.4	9,470	23.1	▲7.5
NPD	Michael Schumacher	5,261	3.5		5,071	3.3	▲2.6
Greens	Jörgen Fuchs	4,252	2.8	0.0	5,989	3.9	▲0.5
Independent	Christian Ronge	1,072	0.7				
GRAUEN					835	0.6	
PBC	Matthias Kohlstedt	740	0.5		658	0.4	
MLPD					407	0.3	
Informal votes		3,268			2,954		
Total valid votes		151,458			151,772		
Turnout		154,726	71.9	▲0.4			
SPD hold	Majority	2,183	1.5				
