= Rövershagen Karls Erlebnisdorf station =

Railway station in Rövershagen Karls Erlebnisdorf, Germany

Rövershagen Karls Erlebnisdorf (Purkshof)
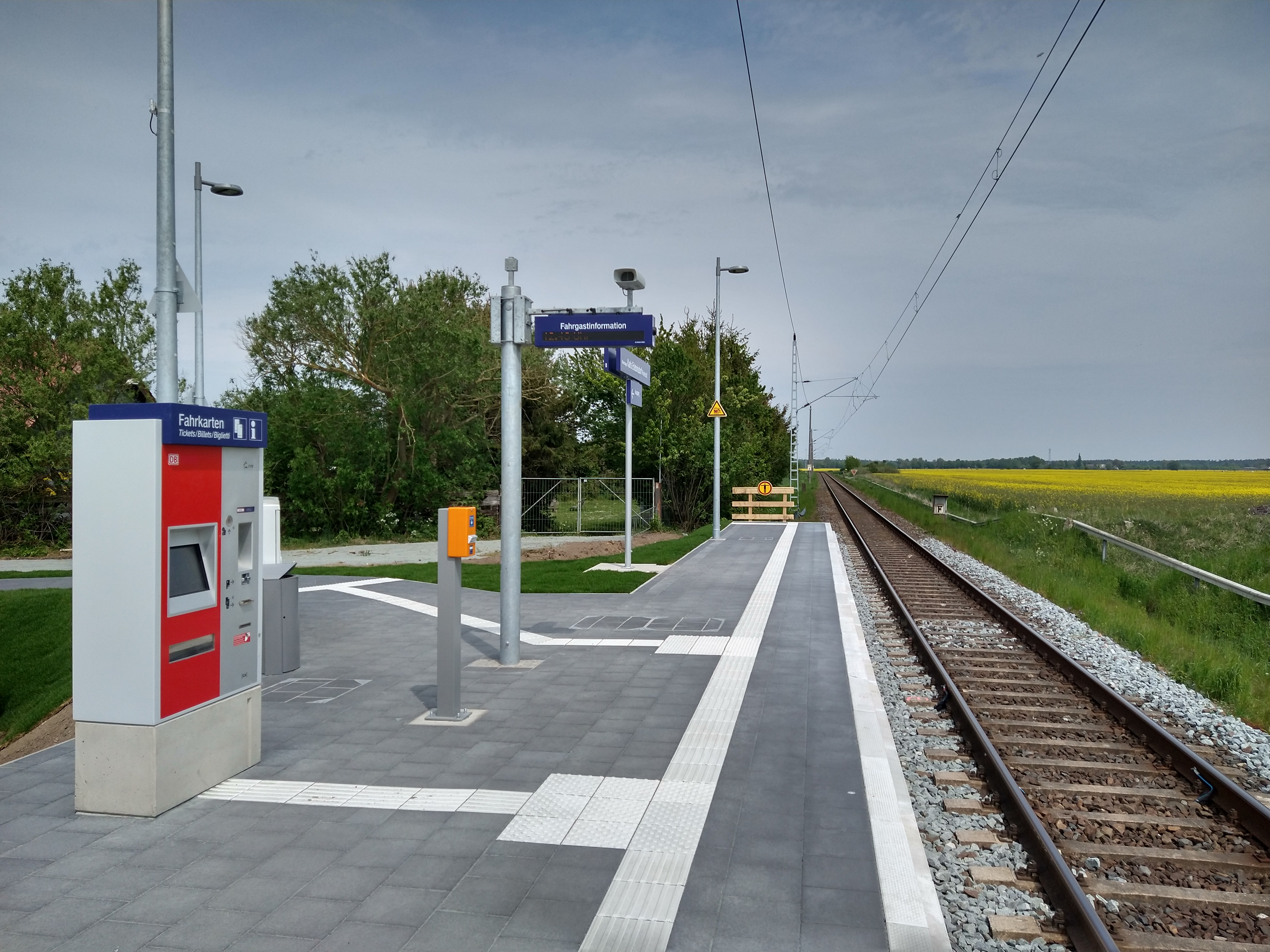
- 2023

General information
- Location: Purkshof 41; 18182 Rövershagen, MV; Germany
- Coordinates: 54.16°N 12.23°E
- Owner: DB Netz
- Operator: DB InfraGO
- Line: Stralsund–Rostock railway
- Platforms: 1 side platform
- Tracks: 1
- Train operators: DB Regio Nordost

Other information
- Website: www.bahnhof.de

History
- Opened: 26 May 2023; 3 years ago

Services
Preceding station	DB Regio Nordost	Following station
Mönchhagen towards Rostock Hbf	RB 12	Rövershagen towards Graal-Müritz or Ribnitz-Damgarten West
Location

Rövershagen Karls Erlebnisdorf (Purkshof) station is a railway station in the municipality of Rövershagen, Mecklenburg-Vorpommern, Germany. The station was opened on May 26, 2023, following three months of construction. The station primarily caters to guests visiting Karls Erlebnisdorf Rövershagen. The construction of a station for Karl's Erlebnisdorf near Rövershagen had been planned since 2019 but was stalled by the COVID-19 pandemic. The construction of the station required an investment of approximately 1.7 million euros, with the majority of the funding provided by the state of Mecklenburg-Vorpommern. Additionally, Robert Dahl, owner of Karls Erlebnisdorf, contributed to the financing of the project. In the maiden regional train, Mecklenburg-Vorpommern's Minister President, Manuela Schwesig (SPD), sat among approximately 200 guests. The inauguration of the station marked a significant milestone for the region's transportation infrastructure. It became the 180th railway station to be integrated into Mecklenburg-Vorpommern's Deutsche Bahn railway network.

The station is served by the RB 12 line, which connects the station towards Graal-Müritz and Rostock. Two train pairs also operate to Ribnitz-Damgarten West. The trains are operated by DB Regio Nordost.

== Train Services ==
The station is served by the following services:

Line	Route		Frequency	Operator
RB 12	Rostock – Rövershagen Karls Erlebnisdorf – Rövershagen –	Rostock-Torfbrücke – Graal-Müritz	every hour	DB Regio Nordost
RB 12	Rostock – Rövershagen Karls Erlebnisdorf – Rövershagen –	Ribnitz-Damgarten West	2 train pairs	DB Regio Nordost
