= Graal-Müritz Koppelweg station =

Railway station in Graal-Müritz

Graal-Müritz Koppelweg
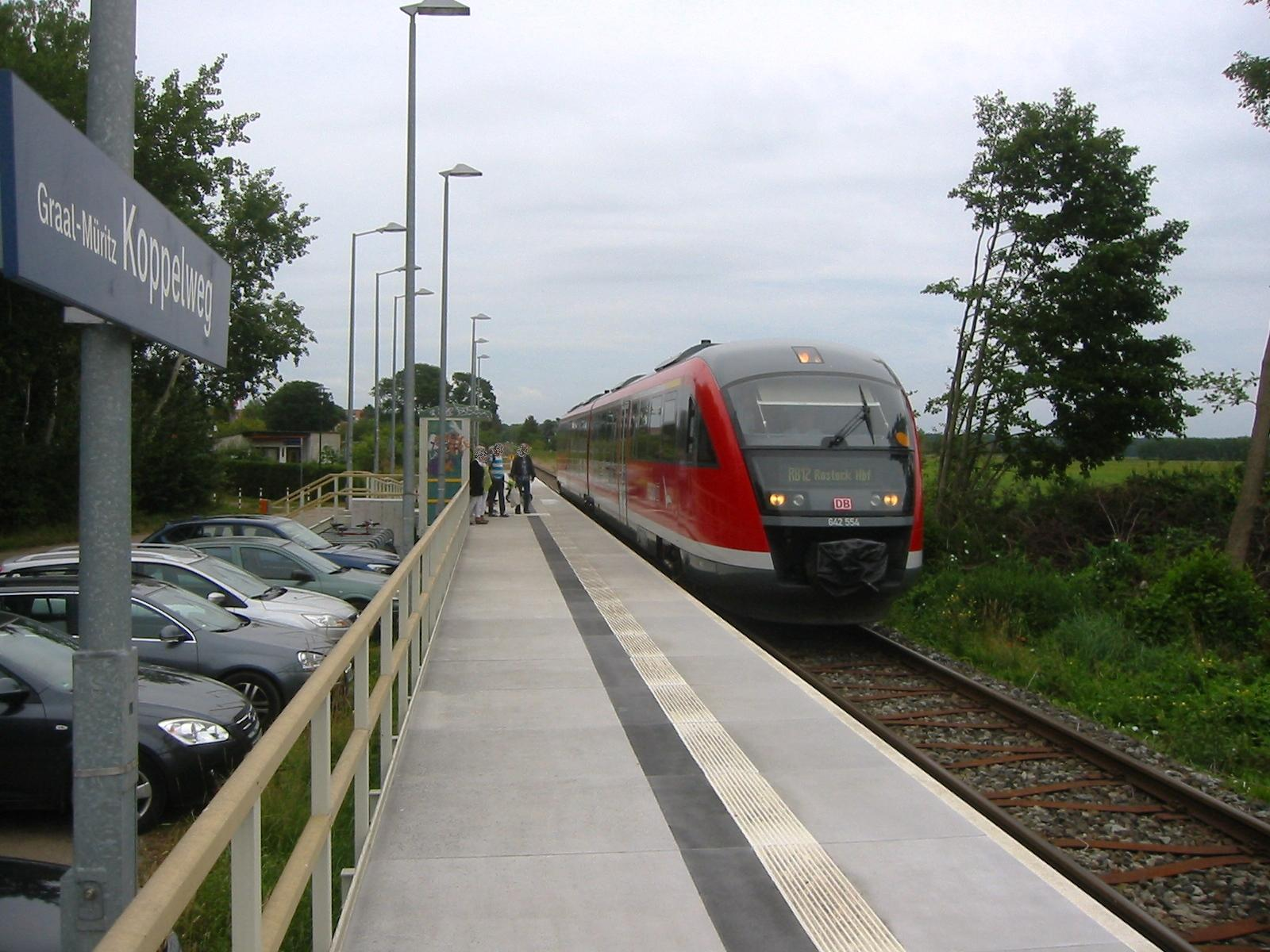
- 2012

General information
- Location: Koppelweg; 18181 Graal-Müritz; Mecklenburg-Vorpommern
- Coordinates: 54.2459°N 12.2370°E
- Owner: DB Netz
- Operator: DB Station&Service
- Line: Mecklenburg Spa Railway
- Platforms: 1 side platform
- Tracks: 1
- Train operators: DB Regio Nordost

Other information
- Station code: 8141
- DS100 code: WGMW
- IBNR: 8012584
- Category: 7
- Website: www.bahnhof.de

History
- Opened: 10 December 2006; 19 years ago

Services
Preceding station	DB Regio Nordost	Following station
Rostock-Torfbrücke towards Bad Doberan	RB 12	Graal-Müritz Terminus
Location
- Location within Mecklenburg-Vorpommern Location within Germany Location within Europe

Graal-Müritz Koppelweg station is a railway station in the municipality of Graal-Müritz, located in the district of Rostock, Mecklenburg-Vorpommern, Germany.
