= Municipal forest =

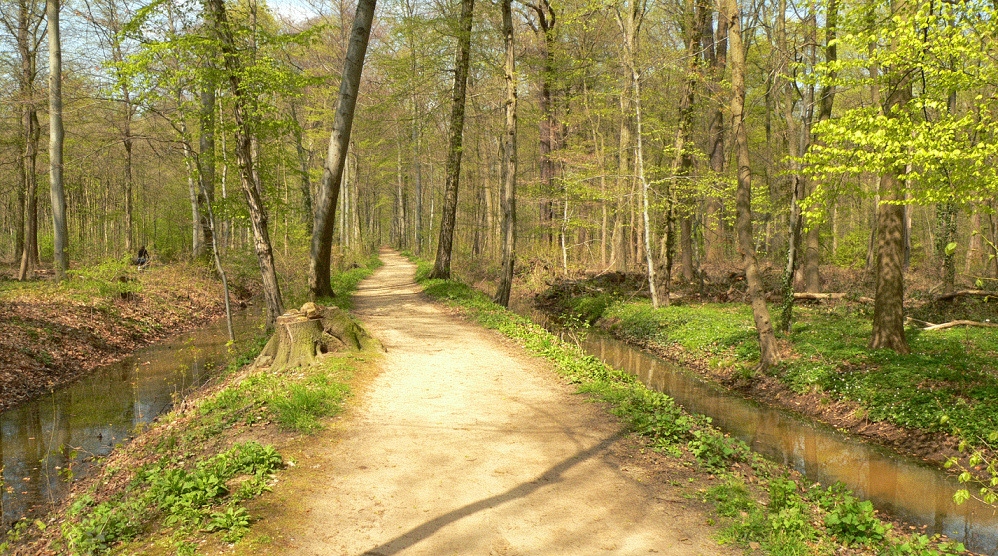
Eilenriede Municipal Forest with rampart and ditch remains of medieval Landwehr boundary defences

A municipal forest or municipal woodland is a forest or wood owned by a town or city. Such woods often have a higher density of leisure facilities like play parks, restaurants and cafes, bridleways, cycle paths and footpaths. Unlike an urban forest, which is located largely or entirely within an urban area and may be privately owned, a municipal forest is publicly owned and may well be outside the city or town to which it belongs. Most urban forests will be municipal forests, but many municipal forests are non-urban.

== Europe ==
=== Germany ===
In Germany municipal forests are usually corporate forests in accordance with Section 3 of the Federal Forest Act (§ 3 Bundeswaldgesetz). Among the best known municipal forests in Germany are the Tiergarten (210 ha) in Berlin, the Berlin City Forest (28,500 ha) which includes the Grunewald (ca. 3,000 ha) and Köpenick Forest (ca. 6,500 ha), the Frankfurt City Forest (3,866 ha), the Dresden Heath (6,133 ha) and the Rostock Heath (6,004 ha), which are some of the largest in the world. The Duisburg City Forest, together with the Broich-Speldorf Forest in Mülheim an der Ruhr, the Sportpark Duisburg and the Duisburg Huckinger Mark form a contiguous forest area of about 3,000 ha. The Leipzig Riverside Forest is one of the largest surviving riparian forests in Central Europe.

==== List of municipal forests in Germany ====
- Berlin City Forest (28,500 ha) with Grunewald, Köpenick Forest and other woodland areas in and around Berlin
- Brilon Municipal Forest (7,750 ha)
- Baden-Baden, Municipal Forest (ca. 7,500 ha)
- Augsburg Municipal Forest (7,000 ha)
- Dresden Heath (6,133 ha)
- Rostock Heath (6,000 ha)
- Villingen-Schwenningen Municipal Forest (5,841 ha; in toto 8,114,5 ha)
- Wiesbaden Municipal Forest (5,600 ha)
- Freiburg Municipal Forest (5,200 ha)
- Boppard Municipal Forest (4,360 ha)
- Frankfurt City Forest (3,866 ha Stadtwald. in toto 5,785 ha)
- Fürstenwalde Municipal Forest (4,677 ha woods with 90% pine forest and 10% deciduous)
- Mühlhausen Municipal Forest (3,093 ha)
- Weißenburg Municipal Forest (2,806 ha)
- Koblenz Municipal Forest (2,772 ha)
- Bielefeld Municipal Forest (2,256 ha)
- Salzwedel Municipal Forest (1,400 ha)
- Leipzig Riverside Forest (1,163 ha of forest. In toto ca. 2,500 ha)
- Calw Black Forest (1.100 ha)
- Lauerholz in Lübeck (960 ha)
- Steigerwald in Erfurt (800 ha)
- Eilenriede in Hanover (650 ha)
- Duisburg City Forest (600 ha)
- Fürth Municipal Forest (560 ha)
- Eschweiler Municipal Forest (350 ha)
- Cologne Municipal Forest (205.3 ha)
- Marienhölzung in Flensburg (200 ha)
- Krefeld Municipal Forest (120 ha)
- Seelhorst in Hanover (100 ha)

=== France ===
- Bois de Boulogne in Paris
- Bois de Vincennes in Paris

=== Austria ===
- Vienna Woods (105,645 ha, of which 8,650 ha are in Vienna)
- Lainzer Tiergarten (2,450 ha) in Vienna
- Lobau (2,300 ha) in Vienna
- Viennese Prater (600 ha)

=== Switzerland ===
- Stadtwald (1.200 ha) und Sihlwald (1.000 ha) in Zürich (Schweiz)

== United States ==
- Jefferson Memorial Forest
