= Rostock-Torfbrücke station =

Railway station in Rostock, Germany

Rostock Torfbrücke
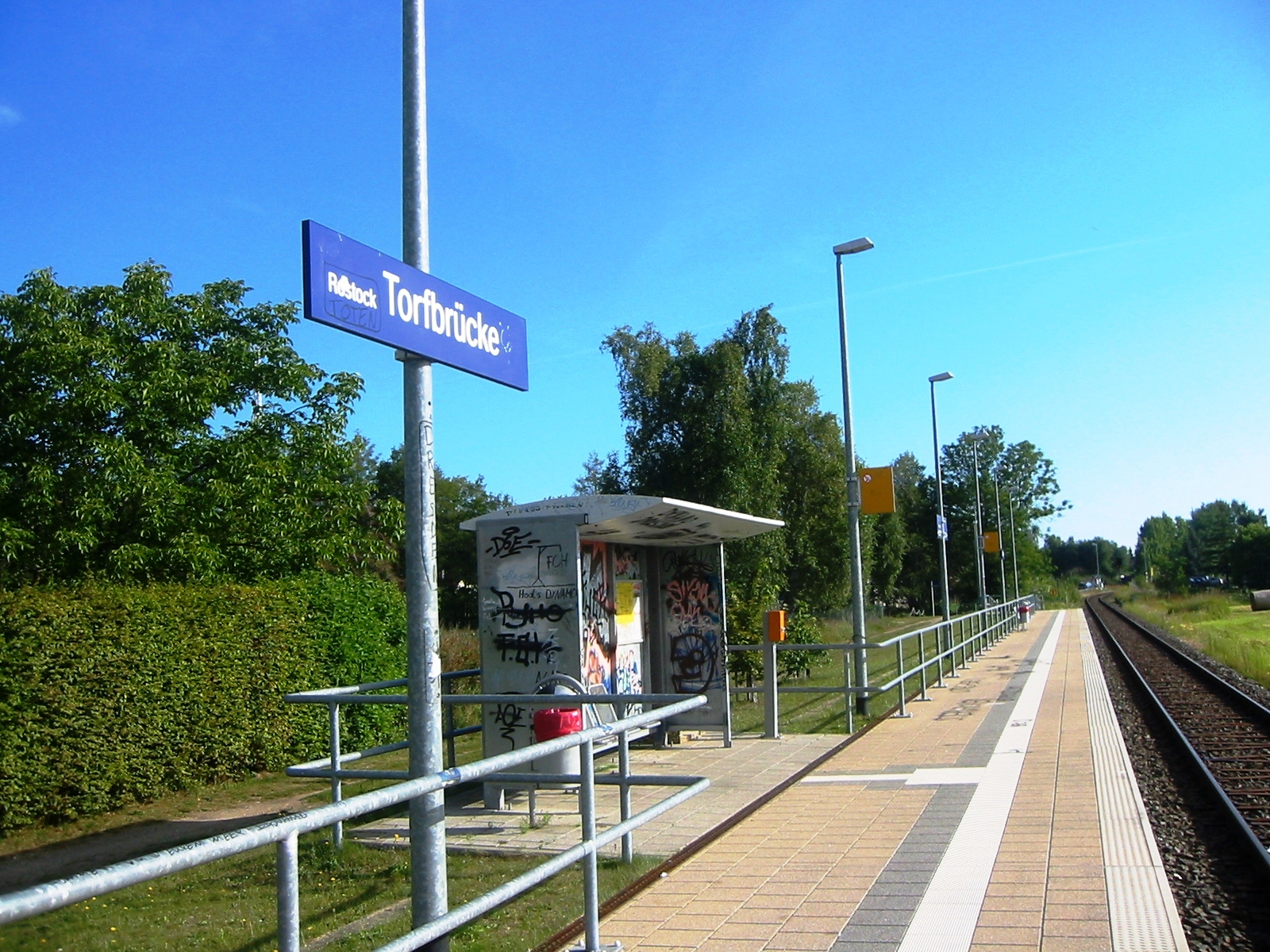
- 2012

General information
- Location: L22/Torfbrücke 6; 18181 Rostock; Mecklenburg-Vorpommern
- Coordinates: 54°14′30″N 12°13′38″E
- Owner: DB Netz
- Operator: DB Station&Service
- Line: Mecklenburg Spa Railway
- Platforms: 1
- Tracks: 1
- Train operators: DB Regio Nordost

Other information
- Station code: 4813
- DS100 code: WGMS
- IBNR: 8012582
- Category: 7
- Website: www.bahnhof.de

Services
Preceding station	DB Regio Nordost	Following station
Rövershagen towards Bad Doberan	RB 12	Graal-Müritz Koppelweg towards Graal-Müritz
Location
- Location within Mecklenburg-Vorpommern Location within Germany Location within Europe

Rostock Torfbrücke station is a railway station in the town of Rostock, Mecklenburg-Vorpommern, Germany.
