= Breitling =

Breitling may refer to:

- Breitling (Warnow), a bay at the mouth of the River Warnow in the Baltic
- Breitling (Bay of Wismar), a bay between the mainland and the Baltic Sea island of Poel
- Breitling SA, a Swiss watch manufacturer
- Breitlingsee, a lake in Brandenburg, Germany
- Breitling Jet Team, a civilian aerobatic display team in Europe
- Breitling Orbiter
