= Mönchhagen =

- Municipality
- Coat of arms

- Location of Mönchhagen within Rostock district
- Interactive map of Mönchhagen
- Location within Germany Location within Mecklenburg-Vorpommern
- Coordinates: 54°08′N 12°12′E
- Country: Germany
- State: Mecklenburg-Vorpommern
- District: Rostock
- Municipal assoc.: Rostocker Heide

Government
  - Mayor: Helga Kentzler

Area
  - Total: 10.58 km^{2} (4.08 sq mi)
- Elevation: 14 m (46 ft)

Population (2025-12-31)
  - Total: 1,288
  - Density: 121.7/km^{2} (315.3/sq mi)
- Time zone: UTC+01:00 (CET)
  - Summer (DST): UTC+02:00 (CEST)
- Postal codes: 18182
- Dialling codes: 038202
- Vehicle registration: LRO
- Website: www.amt-rostocker-heide.de

Mönchhagen is a municipality in the Rostock district, in Mecklenburg-Vorpommern, Germany.

== Geography ==
The municipality of Mönchhagen lies to the east of the Hanseatic City of Rostock in a predominantly flat region that is drained by the stream of the Peezer Bach into the bay of Breitling. The Baltic Sea coast is only 10 kilometres from Mönchhagen (beach at Markgrafenheide).

The village of Häschendorf belongs to Mönchhagen (incorporated in 1970).
