= Johannes Arlt =

German politician

Member of the Bundestag; for Mecklenburgische Seenplatte II – Landkreis Rostock III
- In office 26 October 2021 – 25 March 2025
- Preceded by: Eckhardt Rehberg
- Succeeded by: Ulrike Schielke-Ziesing

Personal details
- Born: 23 April 1984 (age 42) East Berlin, East Germany
- Party: Social Democratic
- Spouse: Dane Bjørn Bjerrehøj (m. 2019)
- Children: 1
- Education: University of the Bundeswehr Munich; Swedish Defence University

Johannes Arlt (born 23 April 1984) is a German soldier and politician of the Social Democratic Party (SPD) who served as a member of the German Bundestag from the 2021 to 2025, representing the constituency of Mecklenburgische Seenplatte II – Landkreis Rostock III.

== Early life and education ==
Arlt grew up in Neustrelitz, where he attended the “Geschwister-Scholl” elementary school and then the Carolinum grammar school. He completed his Abitur in 2003 at the Carl Philipp Emanuel Bach Music High School in Berlin, where he spent his final years.

Arlt began his career as a conscript and was commissioned as a military officer. From 2004 to 2005, he attended the 92nd Air Force Officer Training Course at the Air Force Officer School in Fürstenfeldbruck. He studied political and social sciences at the University of the Bundeswehr Munich from 2006. He completed his studies in 2009 with a degree in political science (univ.). Initially, in 2010, he was a platoon leader in the guard battalion at the Federal Ministry of Defense, and from autumn 2011 he was an adjutant to Brigadier General Rainer Keller as commander of the Air Force Training Command. Arlt was appointed a professional soldier in 2012. From 2013 to 2015, he led the staff company and staff platoon of the Air Force training battalion in Germersheim with the rank of captain. Then, he was assigned to the Air Force Command in the International Cooperation Division. Between 2014 and 2019, he took part in seven Bundeswehr deployments abroad as part of the ISAF and RSM mandates in Afghanistan and MINUSMA in Mali. He most recently served in the general staff service with a major rank. In 2016, he spent several months in Israel training to become a tactical operator for the Heron 1 military drone, i.e. particularly the operator of its reconnaissance equipment. Arlt has more than 1,000 flight hours in this role. After completing staff officer training at the Bundeswehr Command and Staff College in Hamburg, he continued to work in the Air Force Command in the International Cooperation and Arms Control Division. From October 2018, he was assigned to the Joint Operational Planning Group at the Bundeswehr Operational Command.

From 2019 to 2021 Arlt completed his studies at the Swedish Defence University (FHS) in Stockholm. As part of this, he also obtained a Master of Science in War Science and a degree with distinction from the Royal Household. From 2009 to 2015, he also worked as managing director in an event management company.

== Political career ==
Arlt joined the SPD in 2000. From 2002 to 2004 he was sub-district chairman of the Jusos Nordost and member of the Juso federal executive.

Arlt became a Member of the German Bundestag for Mecklenburg Lake District II - Rostock District III in Mecklenburg-Western Pomerania in the 2021 German federal election. Arlt won the constituency with 31.1 per cent of the first votes and thus entered the 20th German Bundestag.

In parliament, Arlt served on the Defence Committee and the Committee on Economic Affairs. His parliamentary office in the constituency is spread across several coworking spaces. In addition, two buses serve as mobile parliamentary offices. In the 2025 federal election, he failed to regain a seat in the Bundestag. He is a candidate in the district council election in Mecklenburg-Western Pomerania 2025 in the district of Mecklenburgische Seenplatte.

== Political positions ==
Ahead of the 2025 national elections, Arlt endorsed Boris Pistorius as the Social Democrats' candidate to succeed Chancellor Olaf Scholz.

== Memberships ==
Arlt is a member of the Heimatverband Mecklenburg-Vorpommern and the Semper talis Bund.

== Personal life ==
His father, who died in November 2007 at the age of 51, was one of the founding members of the SPD in Neustrelitz in January 1990. Since 2019, Arlt has been married to a Danish man. The couple has one child. He lived in Stockholm for two years and is of the Evangelical Lutheran denomination.
