= Eckhardt Rehberg =

German politician

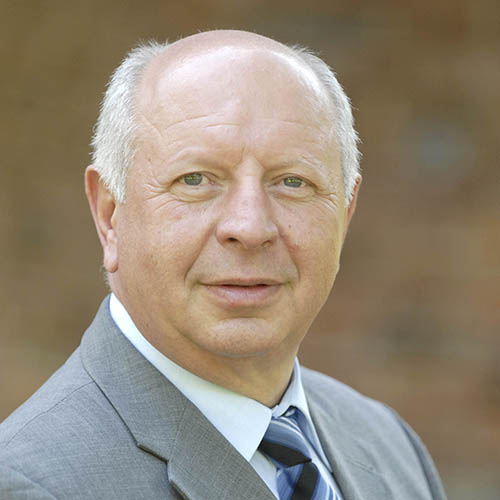
- Rehberg in 2017

Member of the Bundestag; from Mecklenburg-Vorpommern
- In office 18 October 2005 – 26 October 2021
- Preceded by: Multi-member district
- Succeeded by: Johannes Arlt
- Constituency: State list (2005–2009); Bad Doberan – Güstrow – Müritz (2009–2013); Mecklenburgische Seenplatte II – Landkreis Rostock III (2013–2021)

Member of the; Landtag of Mecklenburg-Vorpommern
- In office 26 October 1990 – 31 December 2005
- Preceded by: Constituency established
- Succeeded by: Maika Friemann-Jennert
- Constituency: Ribnitz-Damgarten I (1990–1994); Nordvorpommern I (1994–2005)

Personal details
- Born: Eckhardt Harald Rehberg; 3 April 1954 (age 72) Ribnitz-Damgarten, East Germany
- Party: Christian Democratic Union (since 1990)
- Other political affiliations: East CDU (1984–1990)
- Children: 2
- Occupation: Politician; Businessman; Lay judge
- Website: Official website

Eckhardt Rehberg (born 3 April 1954) is a German politician of the Christian Democratic Union (CDU) who served as a member of the Bundestag from the state of Mecklenburg-Vorpommern from 2005 until 2021.

== Political career ==
=== Career in state politics ===
From 1990 until 2005, Rehberg served as a member of the State Parliament of Mecklenburg-Vorpommern. From 2001 until 2005, he was the chairman of the CDU in Mecklenburg-Vorpommern. During that time, he was the party's candidate to unseat incumbent Minister-President Harald Ringstorff in the 2002 Mecklenburg-Vorpommern state election; he eventually lost against Ringstorff.

=== Member of the German Parliament (2005–2021) ===
Rehberg became a member of the Bundestag in the 2005 German federal election. From 2005 until 2009, he served on the Committee on Economic Affairs and Technology. From 2009 until 2021, he was a member of the Budget Committee. In 2015 he also became his parliamentary group's spokesperson on the national budget. He was also a member of the so-called Confidential Committee (Vertrauensgremium) of the Budget Committee, which provides budgetary supervision for Germany's three intelligence services, BND, BfV and MAD. In addition to his committee assignments, he served on the Council of Elders, which – among other duties – determines daily legislative agenda items and assigns committee chairpersons based on party representation.

In the negotiations to form Merkel's fourth coalition government following the 2017 federal elections, Rehberg was part of the working group on financial policies and taxes, led by Peter Altmaier, Andreas Scheuer and Olaf Scholz.

=== Later career ===
In 2025, the government of Chancellor Friedrich Merz appointed Rehberg as co-chair – alongside Stephan Weil and Stephan Müller – of an expert commission to advise Minister of Finance Lars Klingbeil on reforming Germany's rules on public debt.

== Other activities ==
=== Regulatory agencies ===
- Federal Network Agency for Electricity, Gas, Telecommunications, Posts and Railway (BNetzA), Member of the Rail Infrastructure Advisory Council (2014–2015)

=== Corporate boards ===
- Deutsche Bahn, Member of the supervisory board (since 2018)
- KfW, ex-officio Member of the Board of Supervisory Directors (2014–2019)
- Nordex, Member of the Political Advisory Board (2009–2013)
- Volkswerft, Member of the supervisory board (2005–2013)
- Ostseestadion, Member of the advisory board (2005–2009)

=== Non-profit organizations ===
- F.C. Hansa Rostock, Member

== Political positions ==
=== Human rights ===
In June 2017, Rehberg voted against Germany's introduction of same-sex marriage.

=== Economic policy ===
Rehberg has been a supporter of the debt brake in the budget of Germany since its introduction in 2009. Amid the economic downturn due to the COVID-19 pandemic in Germany, he demanded that “suspending the debt brake must not become a habit. We have to get back to the regular debt limit as quickly as possible.”

In 2018, Rehberg rejected plans presented by Minister of Finance Olaf Scholz for a European unemployment stabilization fund designed to arm the eurozone against crises. He later criticized the European Commission’s 2019 plans for loosening the EU's budget rules in a bid to free up spending for a European Green Deal, arguing that the Stability and Growth Pact (SGP) already provided enough flexibility to permit public investments.
