= Graal-Müritz station =

Former railway station in Graal-Müritz, Germany

Graal-Müritz
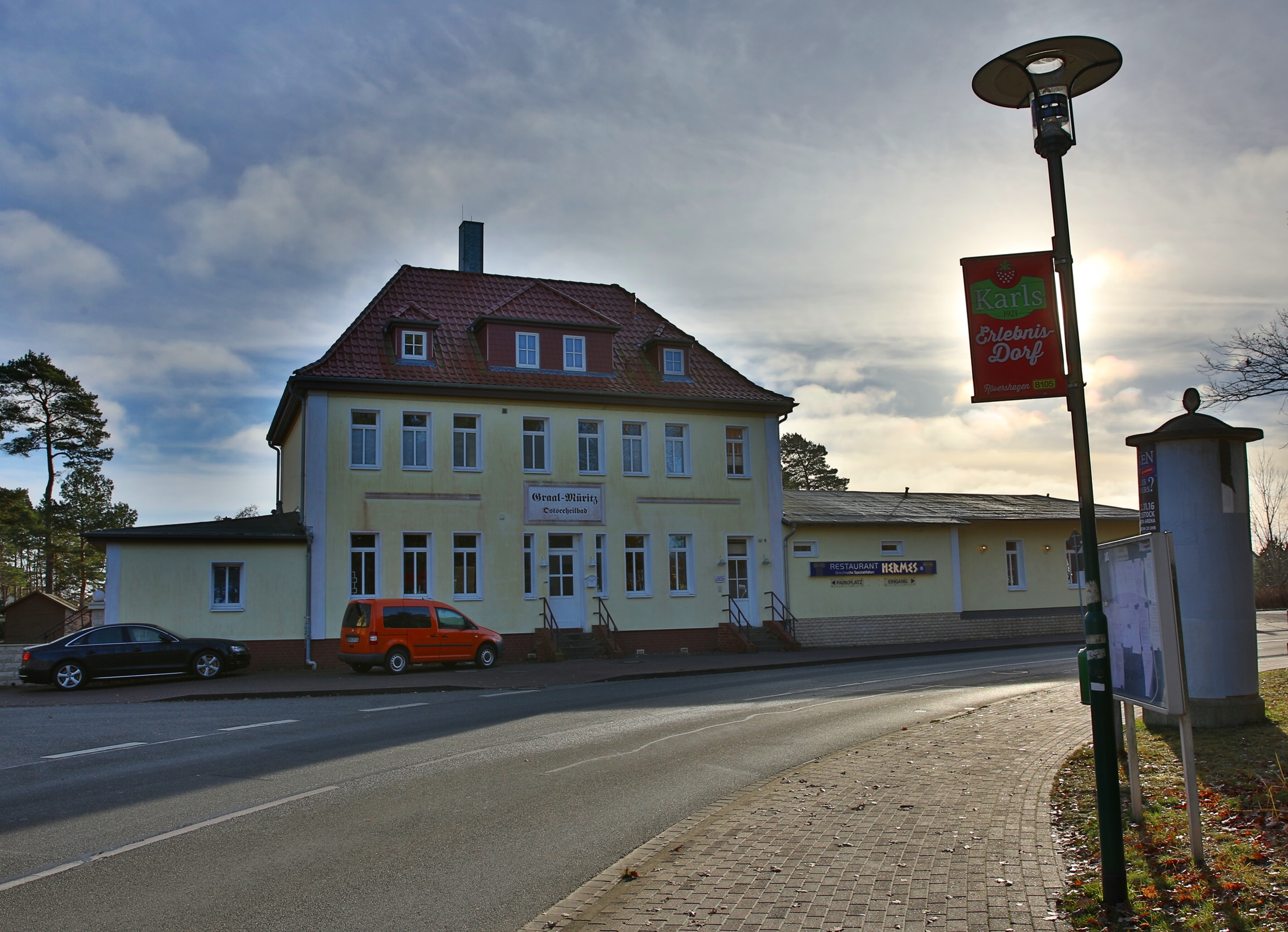
- 2016

General information
- Location: L22/Bahnhofstraße; 18181 Graal-Müritz; Mecklenburg-Vorpommern
- Coordinates: 54.2489°N 12.2457°E
- Owner: DB Netz
- Operator: DB Station&Service
- Line: Mecklenburg Spa Railway
- Platforms: 1 side platform
- Tracks: 1
- Train operators: DB Regio Nordost

Other information
- Station code: 4812
- DS100 code: WGM
- IBNR: 8012583
- Category: 6
- Website: www.bahnhof.de

History
- Opened: 1 July 1925; 101 years ago

Services
Preceding station	DB Regio Nordost	Following station
Graal-Müritz Koppelweg towards Bad Doberan	RB 12	Terminus
Location
- Location within Mecklenburg-Vorpommern Location within Germany Location within Europe

Graal-Müritz station is a railway station in the municipality of Graal-Müritz, located in the district of Rostock, Mecklenburg-Vorpommern, Germany.

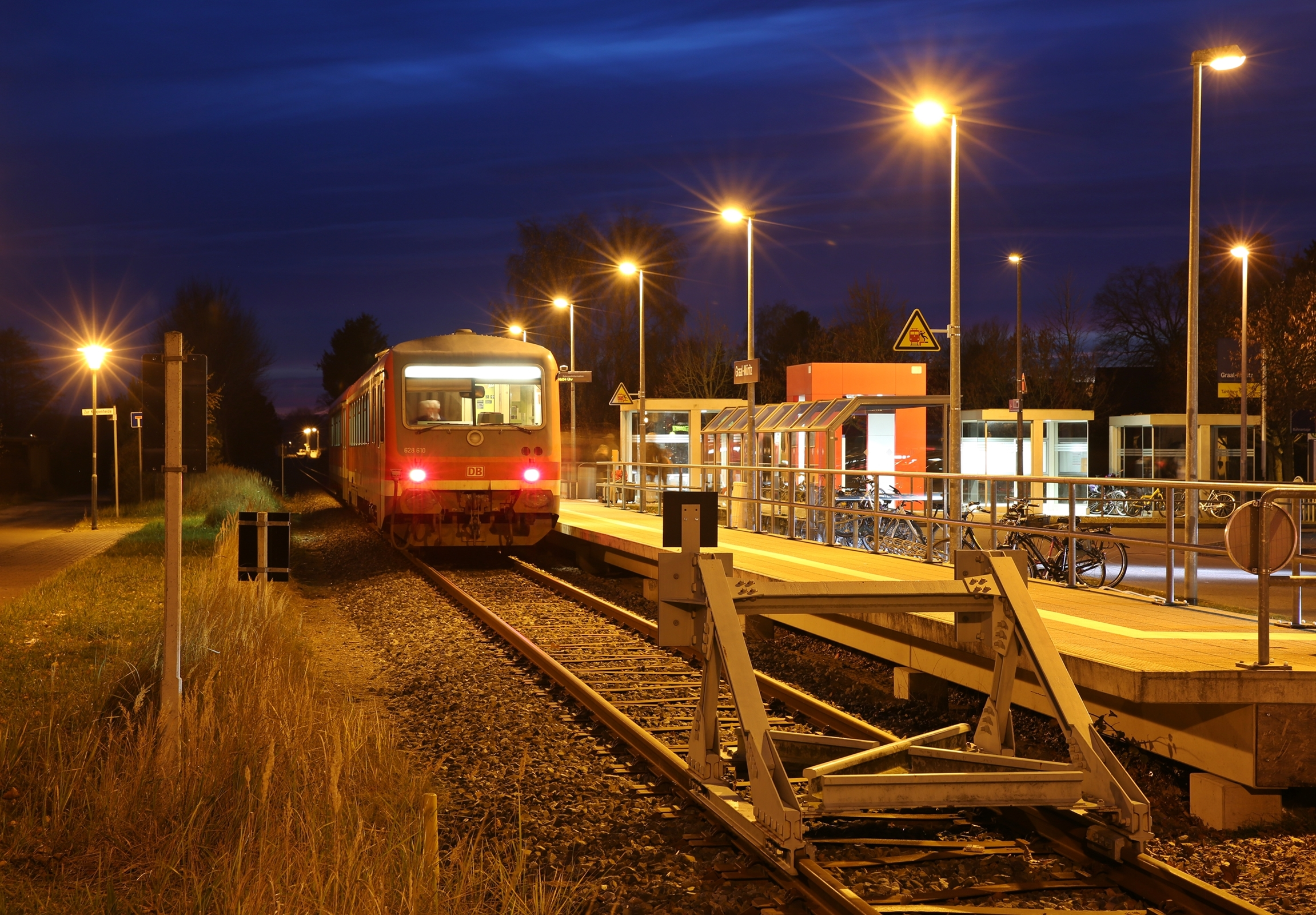
DB Class 628 at Graal-Müritz station (2016).
