= Heidrun Bluhm =

German politician (born 1958)

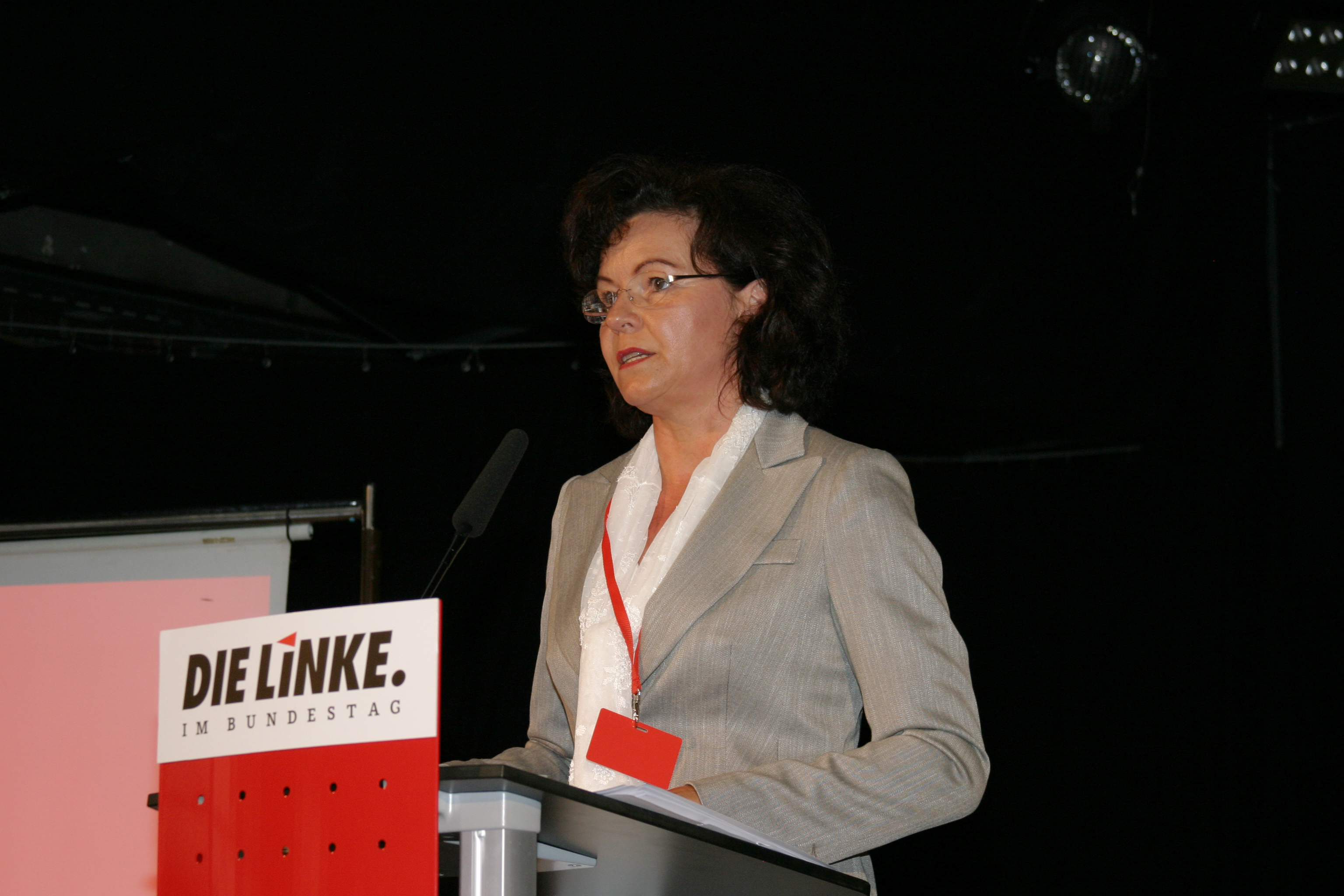

Member of the Bundestag
- Incumbent
- Assumed office 2005

Personal details
- Born: 18 January 1958 (age 68) Schwerin
- Party: "Die Linke."

Heidrun Bluhm (born 18 January 1958 in Schwerin, Mecklenburg-Vorpommern) is a German politician and member of the democratic socialist political party Die Linke.

== Life ==
Since 2005 Bluhm has served as a Member of the Bundestag. In June 2021, Bluhm announced that she will not seek re-election in 2021 German federal election.
