= Rostock Heath =

Forest and heather area near Rostock, Germany

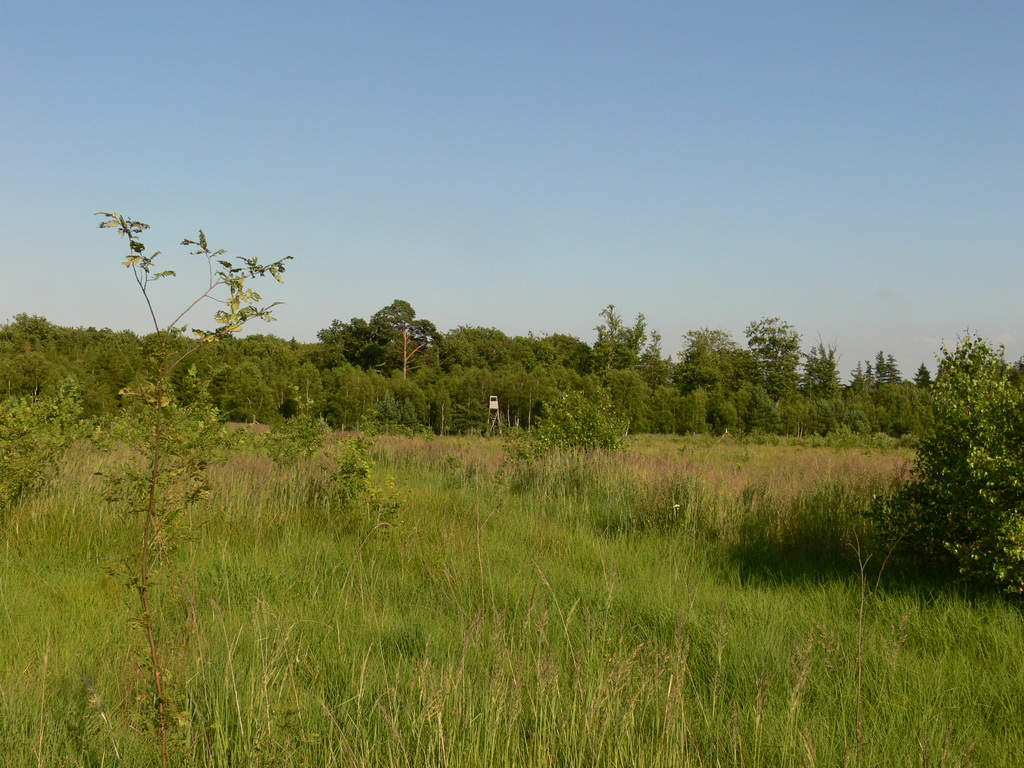
Overgrown firing range of Wiethagen

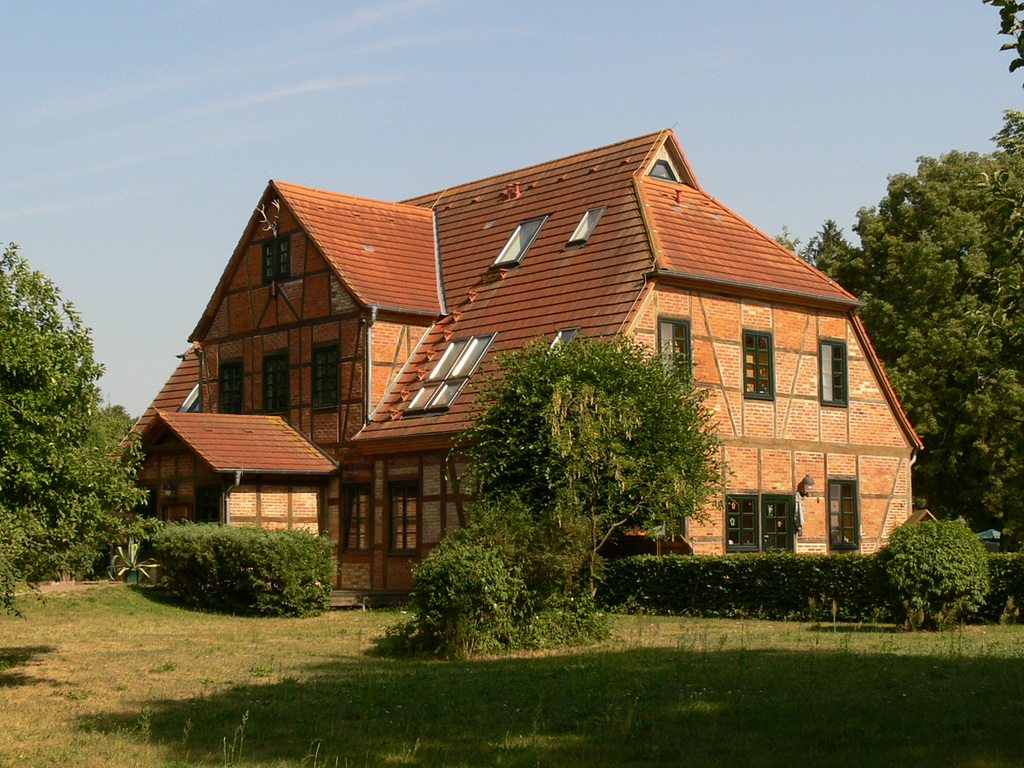
Wiethagen Forester's Lodge (Forsthaus), head office of the Rostock City Forestry Office

Rostock Heath (German: Rostocker Heide) is a wood and heathland region northeast of the German city of Rostock. It has a total area of about 6000 hectares and, since 1252, has been owned by the Hanseatic city of Rostock. As a result of its ownership of the Rostock Heath, Rostock is today one of the five largest communal woodland owners in Germany.

In the district of Rostock is the sub-district (Amt) of Rostocker Heide with its head office in the village of Gelbensande.

== Geography ==
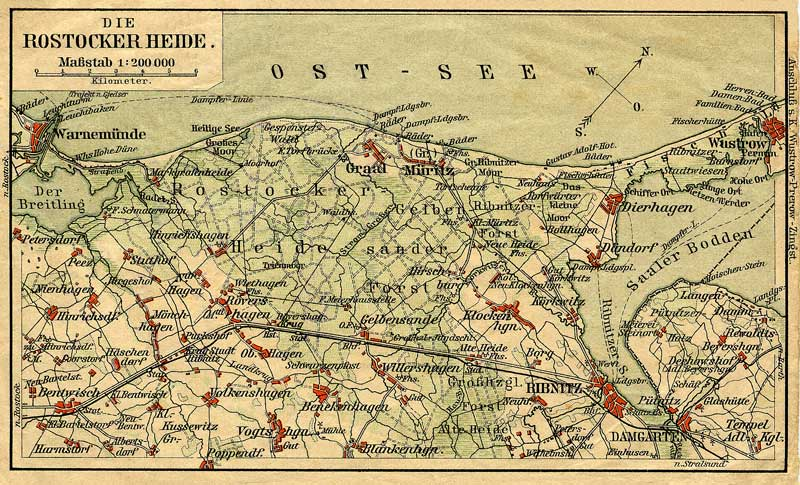
1912 map of Rostock Heath

The wood and heathland region northeast of the city of Rostock is the "Northeast Heath of Mecklenburg" (Nordöstliche Heide Mecklenburgs). This includes the Rostock Heath as well as the Gelbensande Forest, the forest of Alte Heide and part of the Ribnitz Forest. The wooded region is the remnant of an ancient forest that once stretched from the Netherlands to Pomerania.

Rostock Heath covers an area from the Baltic Sea coast between Warnemünde and Wiederort, west of Graal-Müritz. Its boundary follows the forest swathe of Wiedeortschneise and then the Stromgraben in an upstream direction, running past Meyers Hausstelle to the B 105 federal road, which forms its southeastern boundary as far as the Höhe Dwasweg. The edge of the heath then runs in a western direction between Rövershagen and Wiethagen to a point above Niederhagen, before finally following the course of the Bäderstraße road in a southerly direction.

Rostock Heath is divided into the forest divisions of Schnatermann, Hinrichshagen, Torfbrücke, Wiethagen and Meyers Hausstelle.

There are only a few small hillocks on Rostock Heath, such as the Dachsberg southeast of Torfbrücke, the Buchenberg near Schnaterman, the Budenberg northeast of the Heiligensee lake and the Kastanienberg.

A network of ditches and streams, with many branches, overlays the region. Streams include the Rohrbach, Feuerstellenbach, der Stromgraben, Radelbach etc. The largest waterbodies are the Heiligensee - almost circular, with a diameter of about 250 metres - and the east-west oriented Radelsee, which is about 1,200 metres long and 350 metres wide at its broadest point.

The railway line from Rövershagen to Graal-Müritz runs through the heath in a north-south direction, parallel in places to the road joining the two villages.

The Rostock City Forestry Office is responsible for managing Rostock Heath as a subordinate nature conservation authority.

== History ==
In 1252 a fire raged in Rostock. As a result, the town not only bought the wood for rebuilding, but also, on 25 March 1252, 6,000 hectares of the now 12,000 hectare Northeastern Heath of Mecklenburg, the present-day Rostock Heath, from Borwin III.

In the middle of the heath, Wallenstein, the well-known commander in the Thirty Years' War, is supposed to have pitched camp before advancing to Stralsund.

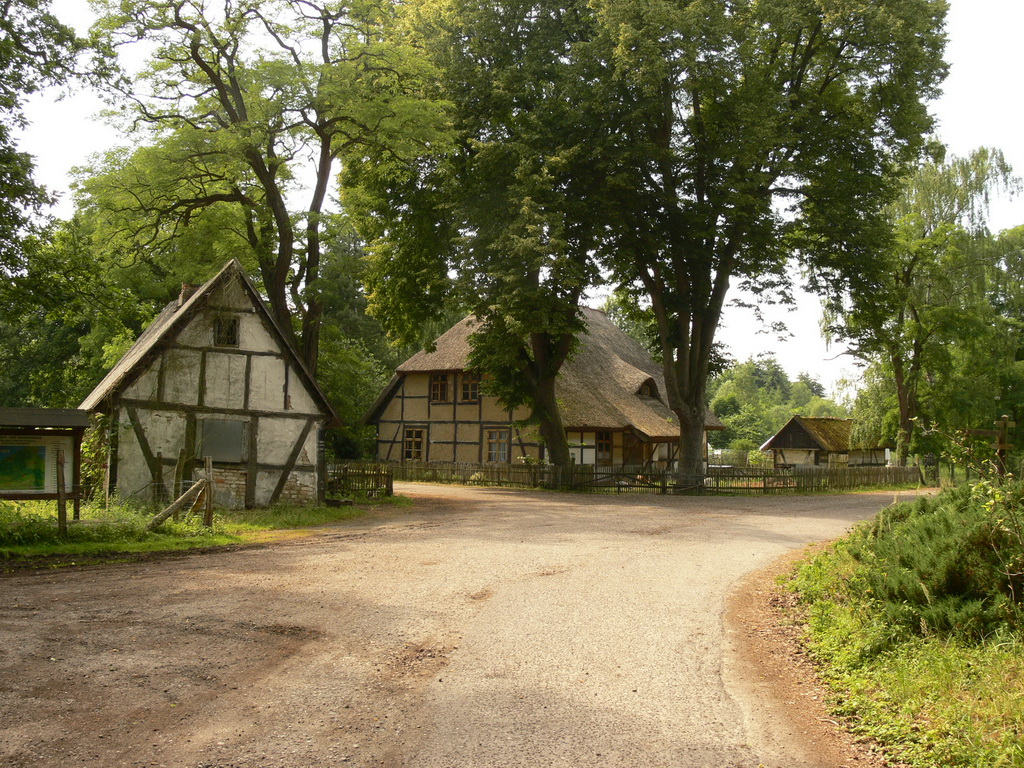
Meyers Hausstelle, a farmstead in the Rostock Heath

Although the Rostock Heath actually belonged to Rostock as a result of the purchase, it was not until 9 December 1924 the villages of Hinrichshagen, Markgrafenheide, Meyers Hausstelle, Schnatermann, Torfbrücke, Waldhaus and Wiethagen were officially incorporated into Rostock.

During the Second World War, a satellite facility of the Rostock aircraft firm, Heinkel, was built in the forest about three kilometres northeast of Wiethagen on an area of 97 hectares. Following the heavy air raids of 1942 production was dispersed into the surrounding countryside. As part of that, the Rostock-Schwarzenpfost subcamp of Ravensbrück concentration camp was built in Oberhagen. Up to 1,500 prisoners, who walked to Oberhagen daily or were transported from Rostock by train, had to work here in the Heinkel factories. On 30 April 1945 the camp was cleared and the prisoners marched towards Warnemünde. After the war the facilities were dismantled and taken to the Soviet Union as war reparations; the buildings were blown up.

In GDR times there was initially a firing range on the Rostock Heath, not far from Wiethagens, and another was laid out on the coast near Hinrichshagen. Later air defence missiles with their associated barracks, bunkers and ammunition depots were added. In 1989, 2,600 hectares of the Rostock Heath were being used by the armed forces. After 1990 the military installations were removed and, in 2000, the firing range near Wiethagen was closed. The sites were renaturalised under EU-sponsored measures.

Since 2000 the forest has been managed by FSC-certified authorities following a decision by Rostock's citizenship.

== Flora and fauna ==
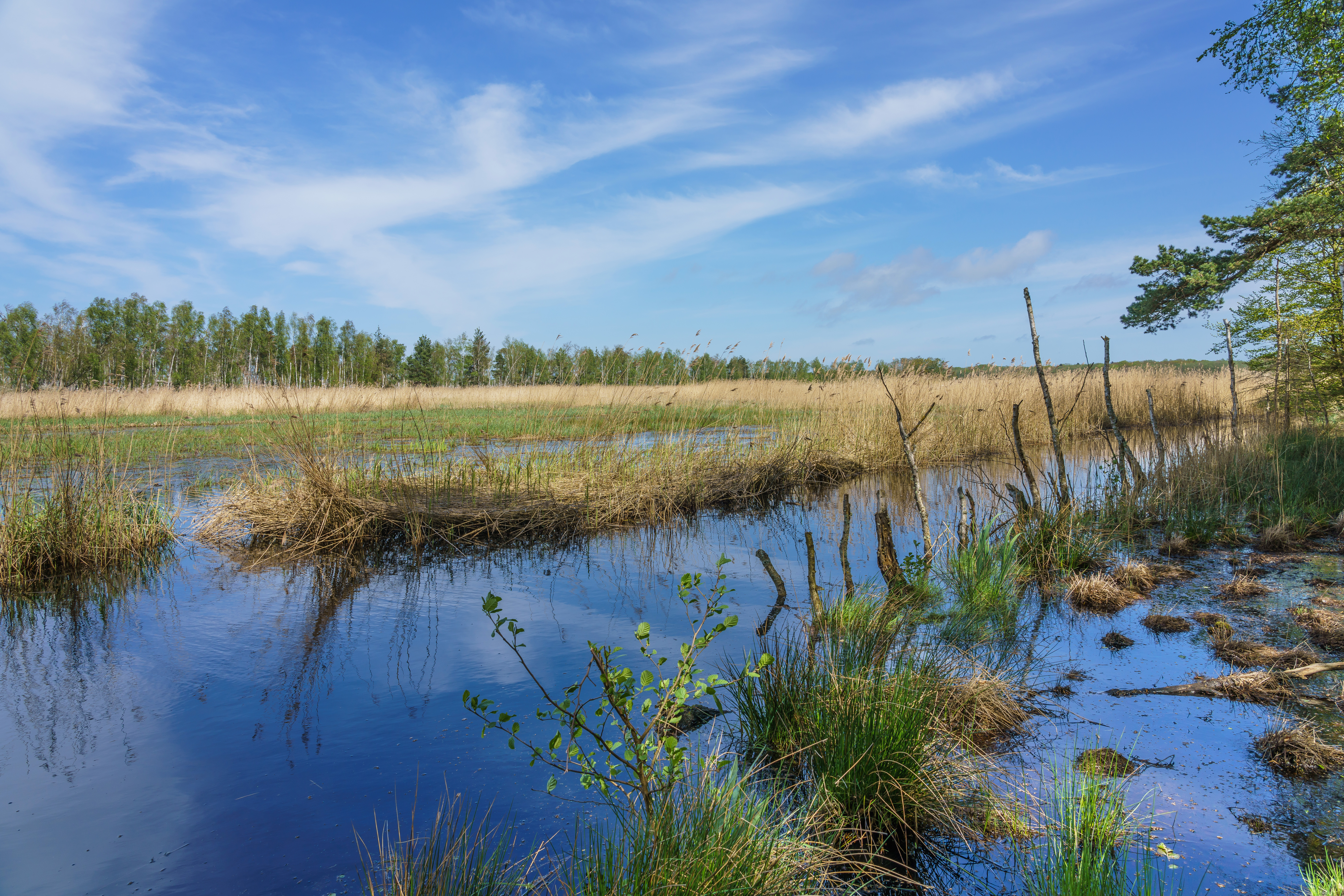
The Hütelmoor

53% of the forested areas of the Rostock Heath are coniferous trees (mainly pine, spruce and larch), of the deciduous trees (47%) the predominant species are beech, oak and birch (as at 1998). 827 hectares of the Rostock Heath are moorland, reedbeds and meadowland. There you will find small reedbeds with spikerushes, home to many insects, marsh marigolds and orchids, kingfisher, crane and white-tailed eagle, old yews, holly and chequer trees. There are marsh gentians on the periodically wet meadows, lousewort and many other plants and animals. The biodiversity of the three nature reserves is particularly great, and parts of them are designated as "total reserves" (Totalreservat).

West of the village of Torfbrücke, the coastal forest bears the name of Gespensterwald ("Haunted Woods"), as the beech trees of this unique forest are stunted and crippled as a result of the constant influence of sea breezes, and appear very odd.

There are three Nature reserves in the Rostock Heath: the Radelsee, Heiligensee Hütelmoor and Schnatermann. Since 1996 the heath has also been recognized as a protected area.

== Memorials ==
Several monuments commemorate people whose lives have been closely connected with the Rostock Heath:

- The Brandt Cross (Brandts-Kreuz) 54°11′32″N 12°11′11″E commemorates the hunter Brandt, who died in 1669 at this spot in a hunting accident.
- The Becker Stone (Beckerstein) 54°11′6″N 12°13′26″E commemorates the forestry inspector Hermann Friedrich Becker from Rövershagen, who regulated forest management in Rostock Heath. In 1793 he presented for the first time a complex, surveyed forestry map of the heath. He also founded the system of swathes on the Rostock Heath. With Heinrich Cotta and Friedrich Pfeil, he is one of the founding fathers of German forestry.
- The Garthe Stone (Garthe-Stein) 54°13′31″N 12°12′38″E commemorates the last of a dynasty of foresters. It was erected in memory of the forestry inspector Max Garthe Junior (1864–1915), who fell in the First World War.
- Charles Bencard (1877–1956) was the successor of Max Garthe Junior. He managed the reforestation of the large areas of tree-felling caused by the war. A memorial stone for him stands in the Coast Forest (Küstenwald), northeast of the lake of Heiligensee 54°13′44″N 12°10′50″E.
- The Krause Stone (Krause-Stein) 54°13′29″N 12°13′5″E is dedicated to the local historian Ludwig Krause (1863–1924), who in 1908 began researching the field names of Rostock Heath.

== Sources ==
- Dietz, Hans (2004), Die Rostocker Heide (in German), Friedland: Verlag Steffen, ISBN 3-937669-25-6
- Steinmüller Wilfried (2008), Rostocker Heide (in German), Ilmenau/Wustrow: grünes herz, ISBN 978-3-86636-151-5
- Rad- und Wanderkarte Graal-Müritz, Rostocker Heide (in German), Ilmenau/Wustrow: grünes herz, 2002, ISBN 3-929993-32-5
