= Ulrike Schielke-Ziesing =

German politician (born 1969)

Ulrike Schielke-Ziesing MdB
- Schielke-Ziesing in 2020

Member of the Bundestag; from Mecklenburg-Vorpommern
- Incumbent
- Assumed office 24 October 2017
- Constituency: State list (2017–2025); Mecklenburgische Seenplatte II – Landkreis Rostock III (2025–present)

Personal details
- Born: 17 June 1969 (age 57) Neubrandenburg, East Germany
- Party: Alternative for Germany
- Children: 3

Ulrike Schielke-Ziesing (born 17 June 1969) is a German politician for the Alternative for Germany (AfD) and member of the Bundestag.

== Life and politics ==
Schielke-Ziesing was born 1969 in the East German township of Neubrandenburg and worked for a social security agency. She entered the newly founded populist AfD in 2013 and became after the 2017 German federal election member of the Bundestag.
