= Gelbensande =

- Municipality
- Coat of arms

- Location of Gelbensande within Rostock district
- Interactive map of Gelbensande
- Location within Germany Location within Mecklenburg-Vorpommern
- Coordinates: 54°11′N 12°18′E
- Country: Germany
- State: Mecklenburg-Vorpommern
- District: Rostock
- Municipal assoc.: Rostocker Heide

Government
  - Mayor: Lutz Koppenhöle

Area
  - Total: 34.05 km^{2} (13.15 sq mi)
- Elevation: 8 m (26 ft)

Population (2025-12-31)
  - Total: 1,809
  - Density: 53.13/km^{2} (137.6/sq mi)
- Time zone: UTC+01:00 (CET)
  - Summer (DST): UTC+02:00 (CEST)
- Postal codes: 18182
- Dialling codes: 038201
- Vehicle registration: LRO
- Website: www.amt-rostocker-heide.de

Gelbensande is a municipality in the German state of Mecklenburg-Vorpommern. It is located in the Rostock district, near Rostock, Ribnitz-Damgarten and Stralsund. Four other villages are part of Gelbensande.

Gelbensande is about 8 km (5.0 mi) from the Baltic Sea coast. It can be reached by car on B 105, as well as by train (Stralsund–Rostock railway).

== Hunting lodge ==
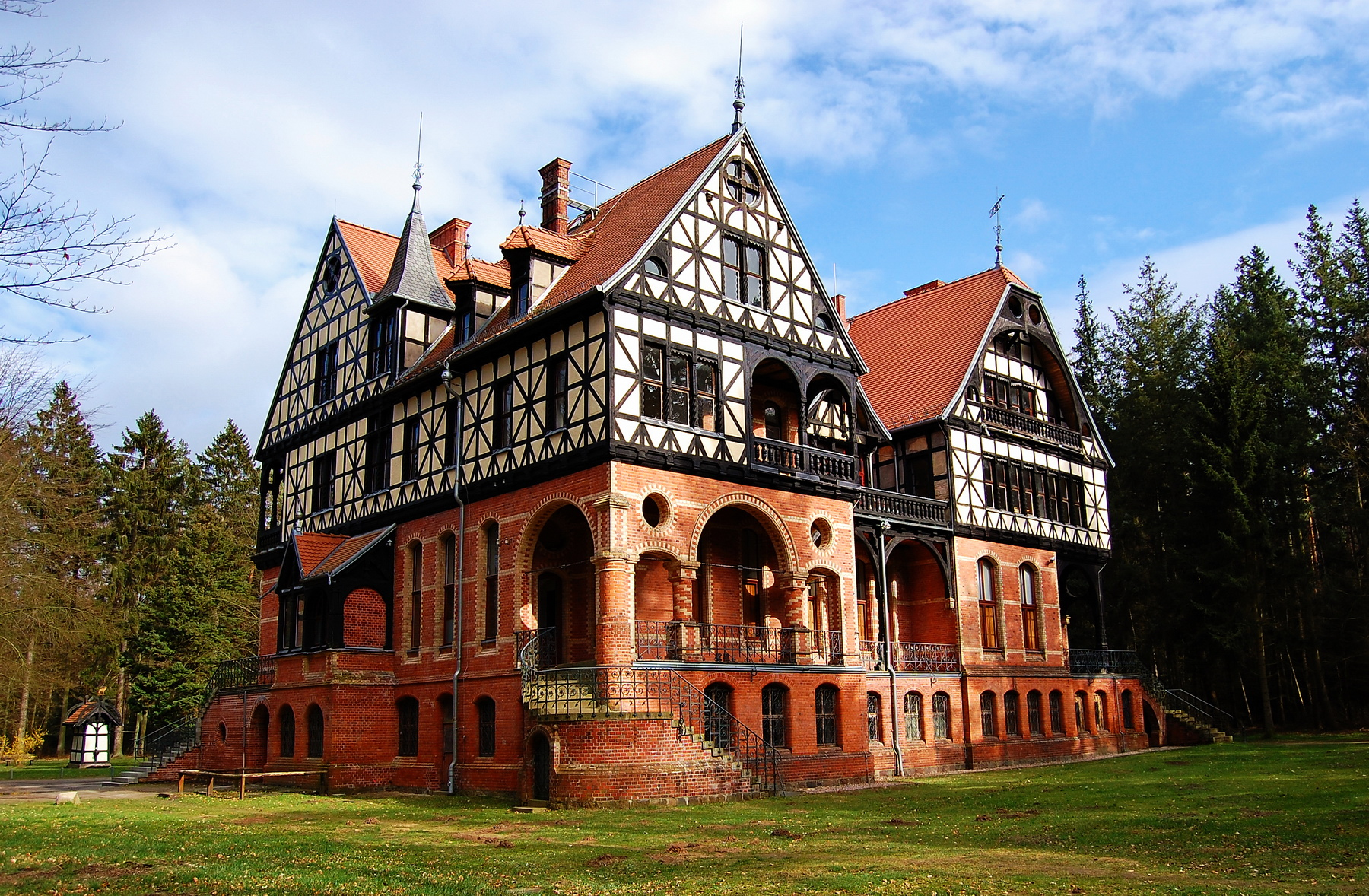
Jagdschloss Gelbensande

Jagdschloss Gelbensande is a hunting lodge or manor that was erected between 1880 and 1885 as a summer residence for Grand Duke Friedrich Franz III of Mecklenburg-Schwerin. After 1887, it was used as a base for hunting in the surrounding forest, the Rostock Heath. Because of the Grand Duke's marriage to one of the Russian Tsar's granddaughters, the Mecklenburg-Russian relationships can still be seen inside the castle today.

The Jagdschloss remained in the Grand Duke's use until 1944. It was subsequently used as an army hospital, a sanatorium for tuberculosis, a public library, a veteran's club and a sort of hostel for construction workers. Since the German reunification in 1989/1990, it is owned by the town of Gelbensande and open to the public as a museum.

Wilhelm von Preußen, German crown prince and son of Kaiser Wilhelm II, got engaged to Duchess Cecilie of Mecklenburg-Schwerin in the Jagdschloss.
