= Mecklenburg Spa Railway =

Railway line in Germany

Rövershagen–Graal-Müritz

Overview
- Line number: 6943

Service
- Route number: 184

Technical
- Line length: 10.3 km (Line class: CM4)
- Track gauge: 1435 mm
- Operating speed: 80 km/h max.

The Mecklenburg Spa Railway (German: Mecklenburgische Bäderbahn) is a non-electrified, single track branch line in the north of the German state of Mecklenburg-Vorpommern. It runs from Rövershagen, east of the Hanseatic city of Rostock, to Graal-Müritz on the Baltic coast. Its name came originally from the name of its operator and was later transferred to the line.

== History ==
=== Origins ===
At the end of the 19th century the villages of Graal and Müritz (then two separate places) strove to become spa towns and seaside resorts. However they were only linked to the larger towns by poorly maintained cart tracks and country roads. As a result, they called for a railway link. During the planning, the following route sections were discussed:

- Ribnitz – Müritz – Graal
- Gelbensande – Graal – Müritz
- Rostock – Nienhagen – Graal – Müritz
- Extension of the Warnemünde–Markgrafenheide Beach Railway
- Rövershagen – Graal – Müritz (direct route along the Pörstenschneise)

In the event the construction of the line was put off due to a lack of finance and the fear of unprofitability. In addition, the most economic route was the line from Rövershagen to the Rostock–Stralsund line, which was operated by the Prussian Railways. This was a further reason for the Mecklenburg Friedrich-Franz Railway not to build a railway line here. The route via Ribnitz was refused as it was very much oriented towards Prussia. Not until 1910 were there solid plans to build the new line; the First World War, however, put paid to them.

=== Foundation, construction and operation ===
Not until the year 1920 were there once again plans to construct and operate a railway, this time as a private branch line. The Mecklenburgische Bäderbahn AG company was founded on 28 February 1925 with the aim of linking the Baltic Sea resorts of Graal and Müritz to the main line from Stralsund to Rostock. The share capital was raised from the Hanseatic city of Rostock and a large number of Rostock businessmen, the local communities and the Berlin Tramway Operating Company, which had two rest and recreation homes for its staff on the Baltic Sea coast. Other shareholders were the railway construction and operating company of Lenz & Co., who carried out the construction and were also charged with running the line. The line was finally completed from Rövershagen, albeit with a gentle detour to the west in order to keep open the possibility of creating a junction by extending the Warnemünde Beach Railway to Hinrichshagen from the direction of Warnemünde. The station at Graal-Müritz, which was so called even before the villages merged, was erected east of Graal and south of Müritz so that the option of continuing the line to Fischland remained open. Neither project was ever realised, however.

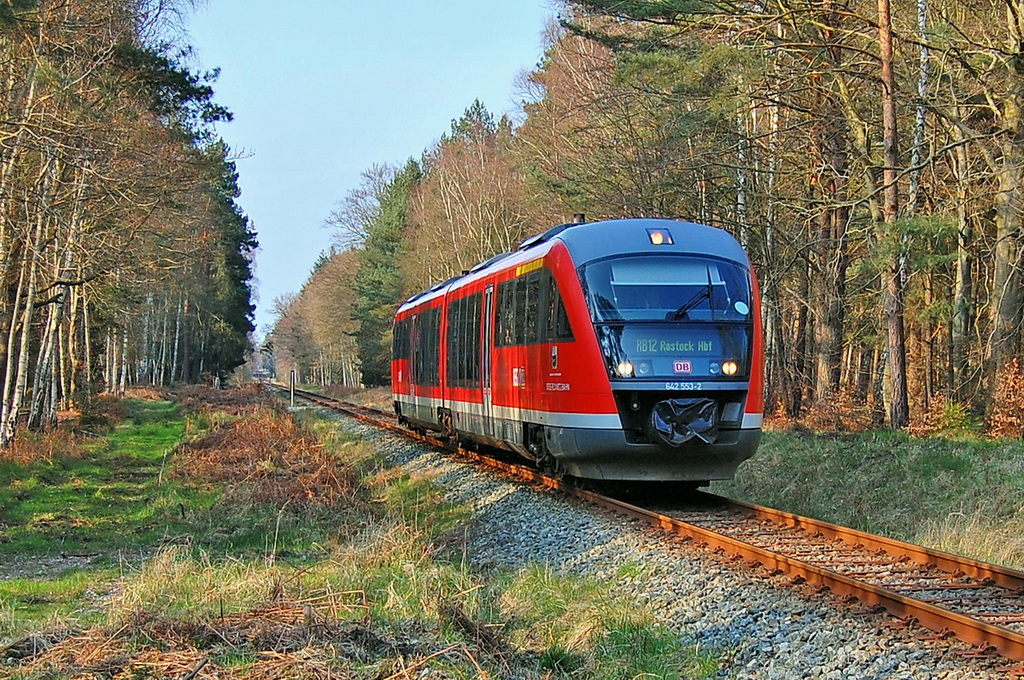
A DBAG Class 642 railcar between Graal-Müritz and Rövershagen

The 10.3 kilometre long, standard gauge line from Rövershagen to Graal-Müritz was officially opened on 1 July 1925. Initially trains only ran during the summer; later they ran all year round. In the 1930s there were even through coaches in the summer from Berlin. After the war, the rest homes in Graal-Müritz which had been turned into military hospitals, were taken over by the Red Army. Transportation was by rail and prevented the line falling victim to war reparations. From 1949 the line was taken over by the East German Deutsche Reichsbahn.

But by the 1960s, consideration was given to closing the route, but it was retained due to lack of bus and lorry capacity. Furthermore, the military had a strong interest in the line because, by then, several firing ranges had been established on the Rostock Heath. In the 1970s, passenger traffic was limited for a number of years to the summer season; in winter buses ran instead of rail services.

In 1993 the halts of Hinrichshagen and Georg Schneise, which lay in the middle of the forest and had been opened in the 1930s, were closed. Goods traffic ceased in 1994 and, in 1999, passenger services were withdrawn due to the poor condition of the track and the track and trackbed were fully replaced. There were various concepts for reactivating the line. For example, it was proposed to electrify the lien and connect it to the Rostock S-Bahn network. However, that was not followed through. Since 12 December 2004 passenger trains have run once again, mainly from and to Rostock Hauptbahnhof. At first, renovation of the line looked doubtful for a long time; only when the community of Graal-Müritz offered to bear a considerable portion of the cost, was work started. As part of the renovation, the line was shortened to 9.7 miles, the station at Graal-Müritz was abandoned and replaced by a halt. After the timetable change on 10 December 2006, the new halt of Graal-Müritz Koppelweg opened. This has a special feature: the 100-metre-long platform is made entirely of glass fibre composite.

== Goods and passenger services ==
Immediately behind Rövershagen a siding branches off to a local gas supplier which is currently still worked. Today it is the only working goods siding on the Rostock–Stralsund railway. Formerly a sawmill at the eastern end of the village of Rövershagen was also served from this industrial siding. This works siding was built even before the construction of the line to Graal-Müritz. In addition there used to be just behind the station exit at Rövershagen a lot of sidings that belonged to a resin factory. By the mid-1990s the access tracks had been removed and, on the renovation of the line, the whole area was cleared. Since the renovation, goods services to Graal-Müritz are no longer possible because there are now no loading sidings in Graal-Müritz any more.

The line is worked by the Regionalbahn line 12, the trains running almost every hour, except for weekends outside the summer season when they run every two hours. Class 642 units are usually used, but occasionally Class 628s as well. In earlier times, diesel locomotives of Class 201 and Class 346 were employed.

== Current developments ==
There are discussions about resurrecting the plans from 1925 and building a line to the Darss Railway (Darßbahn) from Graal-Müritz and Prerow. These proposals have many supporters, especially given the high number of tourists every year and rising amounts of traffic on the Darß with its single connecting road. The Usedomer Bäderbahn railway company assessed the feasibility of these proposals in 2007.

In a press release dated 27 August 2010 it was announced that the state government has approved the construction of the track and begun planning for its construction. The cost of the 19 kilometre route is estimated at 38 million euros. The Meinig Bridge is to be rebuilt as a combined road and railway bridge.

== Literature ==
- Lothar Schultz: Mecklenburgische Bäderbahn. Verlag Neddermeyer, 2007, ISBN 978-3-933254-79-5
- Erich Preuß (1994), Archiv deutscher Klein- und Privatbahnen: Brandenburg, Mecklenburg-Vorpommern, Berlin (in German), Berlin: transpress, pp. 298–301, ISBN 3-344-70906-2
