= Breitling (Warnow) =

Opening in the lower Warnow

Coordinates: 54°10′0″N 12°7′0″E

Warnemünde and the Breitling today compared with the 19th century

The Breitling is a roughly 2,500 metre wide bodden-like opening in the lower Warnow just before its mouth on the Baltic Sea in Germany. Its north to south extent is about 1,500 metres. The Breitling is only linked to the Baltic itself through a narrow access channel in Warnemünde, the Seekanal . For these reasons the Breitling is a perfect natural harbour. On the Baltic side the Breitling is bordered by the Rostock quarter of Hohe Düne. On its southern shore is Rostock Harbour, on the northern shore the port of the German Navy. This is where their corvette squadron and the 7th Fast Patrol Boat squadron is based. In front of Hohe Düne, separated only by the Pinnengraben ditch, lies the uninhabited island of Pagenwerder which has been artificially enlarged by dredging. The island is a protected area and bird nesting site. On the eastern shore, the edge of the Rostock Heath is the historic tourist restaurant of Schnatermann with a small sports boat harbour.

In the 1950/60s there were plans for the Breitling was to be linked via the Coast Canal with the Stettin Lagoon. This project was only partly realised, however, due to high costs.

In autumn 2005 the first offshore wind generator in Germany was built in the Breitling. The wind turbine was erected by the firm of Nordex, based in Rostock, and went into operation in 2006. Include the rotor it measures 90 metres in diameter, is 125 metres high and has a nominal rating of 2.5 Megawatts.

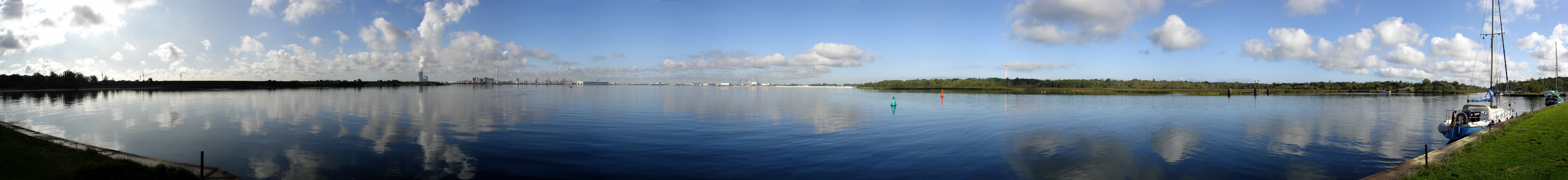
Breitling seen from the Schnatermann with its coal-fired power station, international port and wind power site
