= Rostocker Heide =

- Amt
- Map of Rostock highlighting Rostocker Heide
- Interactive map of Rostocker Heide
- Location within Germany Location within Mecklenburg-Vorpommern
- Coordinates: 54°10′N 12°14′E
- Country: Germany
- State: Mecklenburg-Vorpommern
- District: Rostock
- Seat: Gelbensande
- Subdivisions: 5 municipalities

Area
  - Total: 119.94 km^{2} (46.31 sq mi)

Population (2025-12-31)
  - Total: 10,594
  - Density: 88.327/km^{2} (228.77/sq mi)
- Time zone: UTC+01:00 (CET)
  - Summer (DST): UTC+02:00 (CEST)
- Website: www.amt-rostocker-heide.de

Rostocker Heide is an Amt in the district of Rostock, in Mecklenburg-Vorpommern, Germany. The seat of the Amt is in Gelbensande.

The Amt Rostocker Heide consists of the following municipalities:

1. Bentwisch
2. Blankenhagen
3. Gelbensande
4. Mönchhagen
5. Rövershagen

== Geography ==
The Rostocker Heide, located between Markgrafenheide and Graal-Müritz, is Germany’s largest coastal forest and includes hundreds of hectares of moorland, reed beds, and meadow areas. Researchers from the University of Rostock have reported that parts of the area have begun to experience tree dieback, particularly at the edges and in low-lying areas, due to saltwater intrusion from the Baltic Sea. It is estimated that around nine hectares of forest have been lost over the past 30 years.
