= Rövershagen =

- Municipality
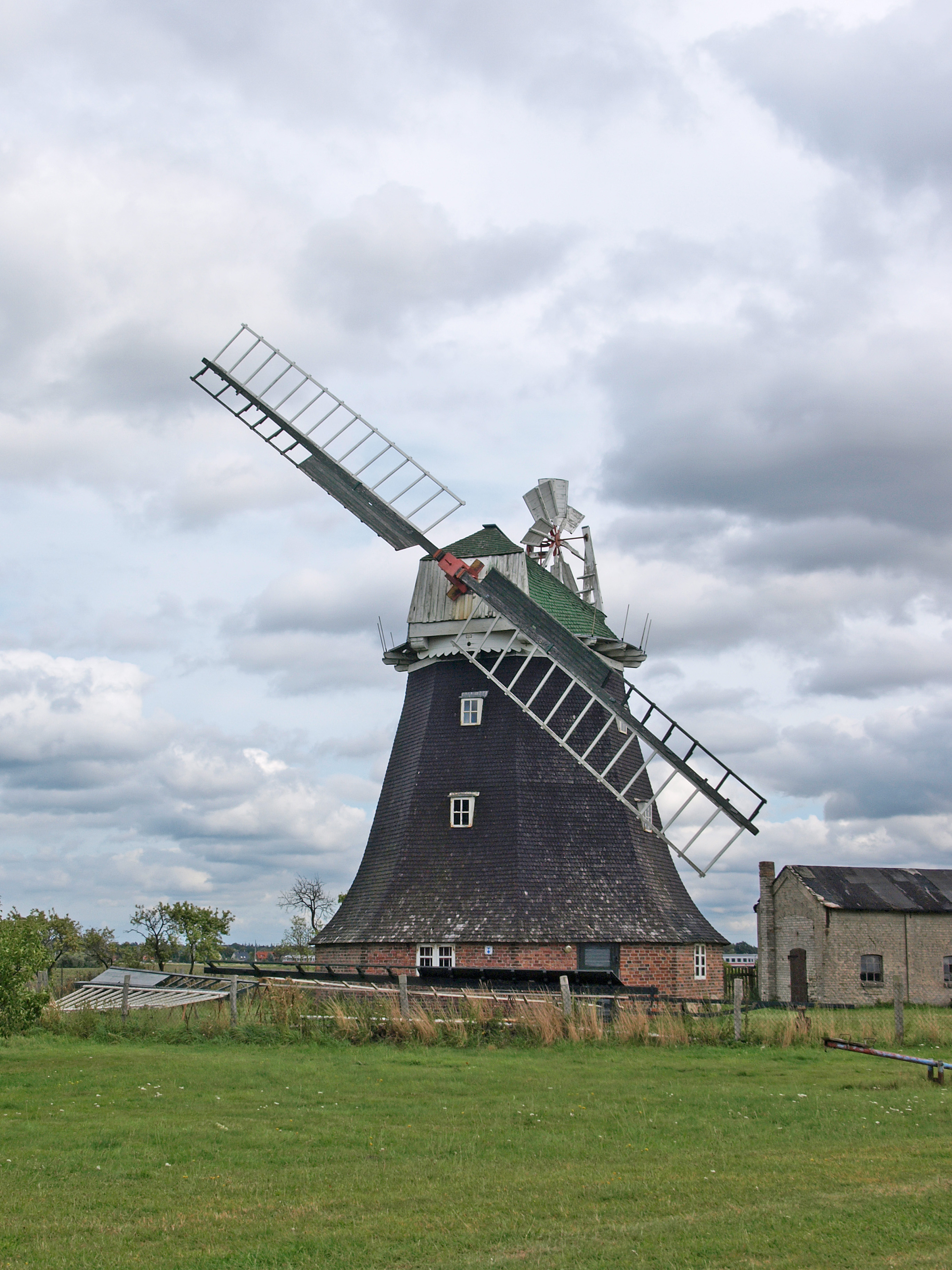
- Rövershagen Windmill

- Coat of arms

- Location of Rövershagen within Rostock district
- Interactive map of Rövershagen
- Location within Germany Location within Mecklenburg-Vorpommern
- Coordinates: 54°10′N 12°14′E
- Country: Germany
- State: Mecklenburg-Vorpommern
- District: Rostock
- Municipal assoc.: Rostocker Heide

Government
  - Mayor: Verena Schöne

Area
  - Total: 20.55 km^{2} (7.93 sq mi)
- Elevation: 13 m (43 ft)

Population (2025-12-31)
  - Total: 2,808
  - Density: 136.6/km^{2} (353.9/sq mi)
- Time zone: UTC+01:00 (CET)
  - Summer (DST): UTC+02:00 (CEST)
- Postal codes: 18182
- Dialling codes: 038201, 038202
- Vehicle registration: LRO
- Website: www.amt-rostocker-heide.de

Rövershagen is a municipality in the Rostock district, in Mecklenburg-Vorpommern, Germany.
