= Graal-Müritz =

- Municipality
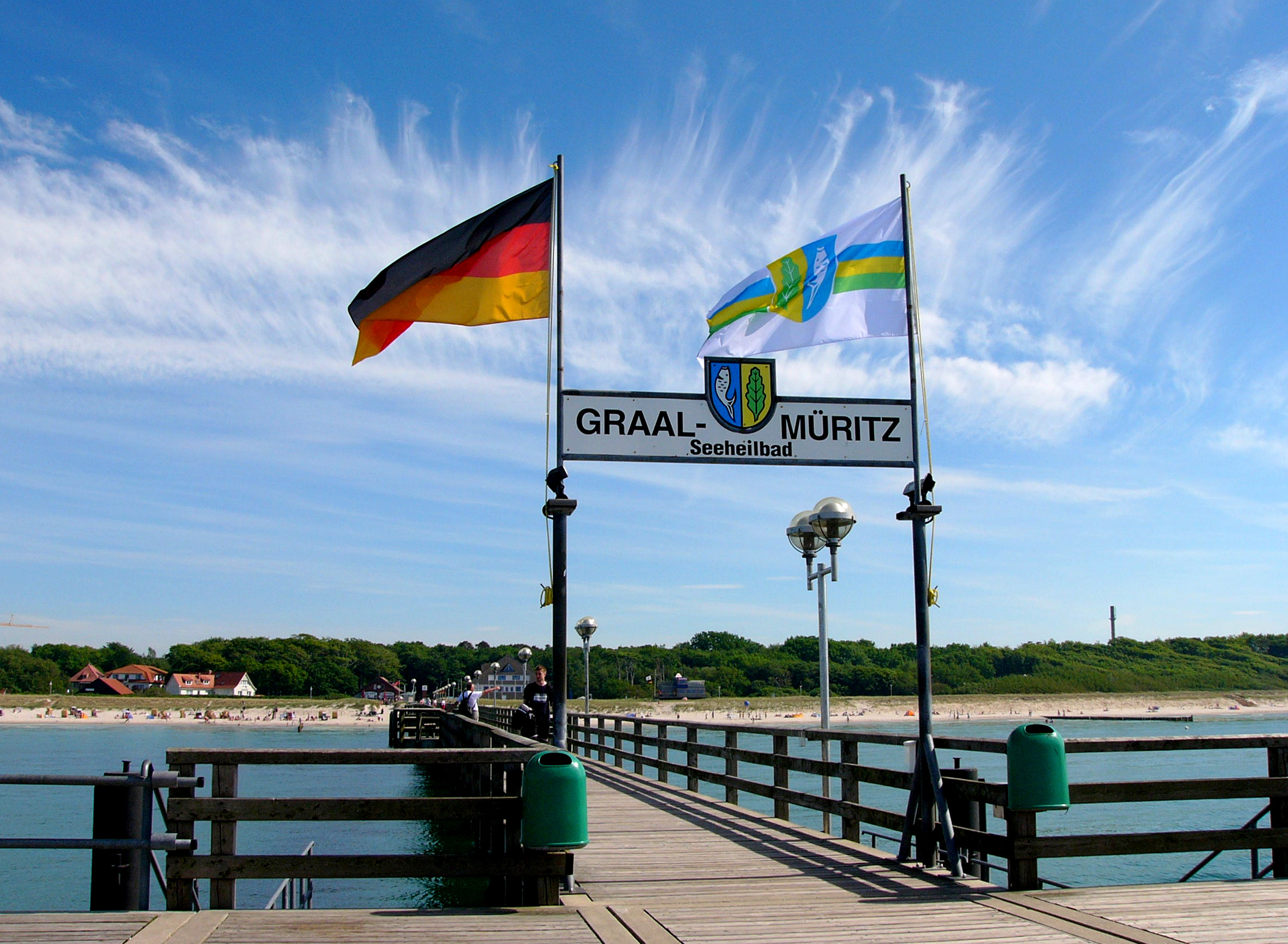
- Pier at Graal-Müritz

- Flag Coat of arms

- Location of Graal-Müritz within Rostock district
- Interactive map of Graal-Müritz
- Location within Germany Location within Mecklenburg-Vorpommern
- Coordinates: 54°15′N 12°15′E
- Country: Germany
- State: Mecklenburg-Vorpommern
- District: Rostock

Government
  - Mayor: Frank Giese

Area
  - Total: 8.34 km^{2} (3.22 sq mi)
- Elevation: 2 m (6.6 ft)

Population (2025-12-31)
  - Total: 4,167
  - Density: 500/km^{2} (1,290/sq mi)
- Time zone: UTC+01:00 (CET)
  - Summer (DST): UTC+02:00 (CEST)
- Postal codes: 18181
- Dialling codes: 038206
- Vehicle registration: LRO
- Website: www.gemeinde-graalmueritz.de

Graal-Müritz is a Seeheilbad (seaside health resort) in the German state of Mecklenburg-Vorpommern. It is located in the Rostock district, near Rostock, Ribnitz-Damgarten and Stralsund.

Graal-Müritz is among the most popular German destinations for tourism and health cures alike. It borders both the Baltic Sea and a large forest called Rostock Heath. The town offers many hotels, restaurants, a 5-kilometre (3.1 mi) beach, a public Rhododendron Park and a well-being and fitness centre. There is an hourly train service to Rostock. This journey takes 30 minutes.

== Museums ==
Graal-Müritz has its own museum of local history called "Heimatstube". In the region, there are several large museums like the Shipbuilding and Seafaring Museum (Schiffbau- und Schifffahrtsmuseum) in Rostock, the German Amber Museum (Deutsches Bernsteinmuseum) in Ribnitz-Damgarten or the German Maritime Museum in Stralsund.

== Sports and recreation ==
The local sports club, TSV Graal-Müritz, plays in the state's league. The Aquadrom is a large well-being, swimming and fitness facility.

== Gallery ==
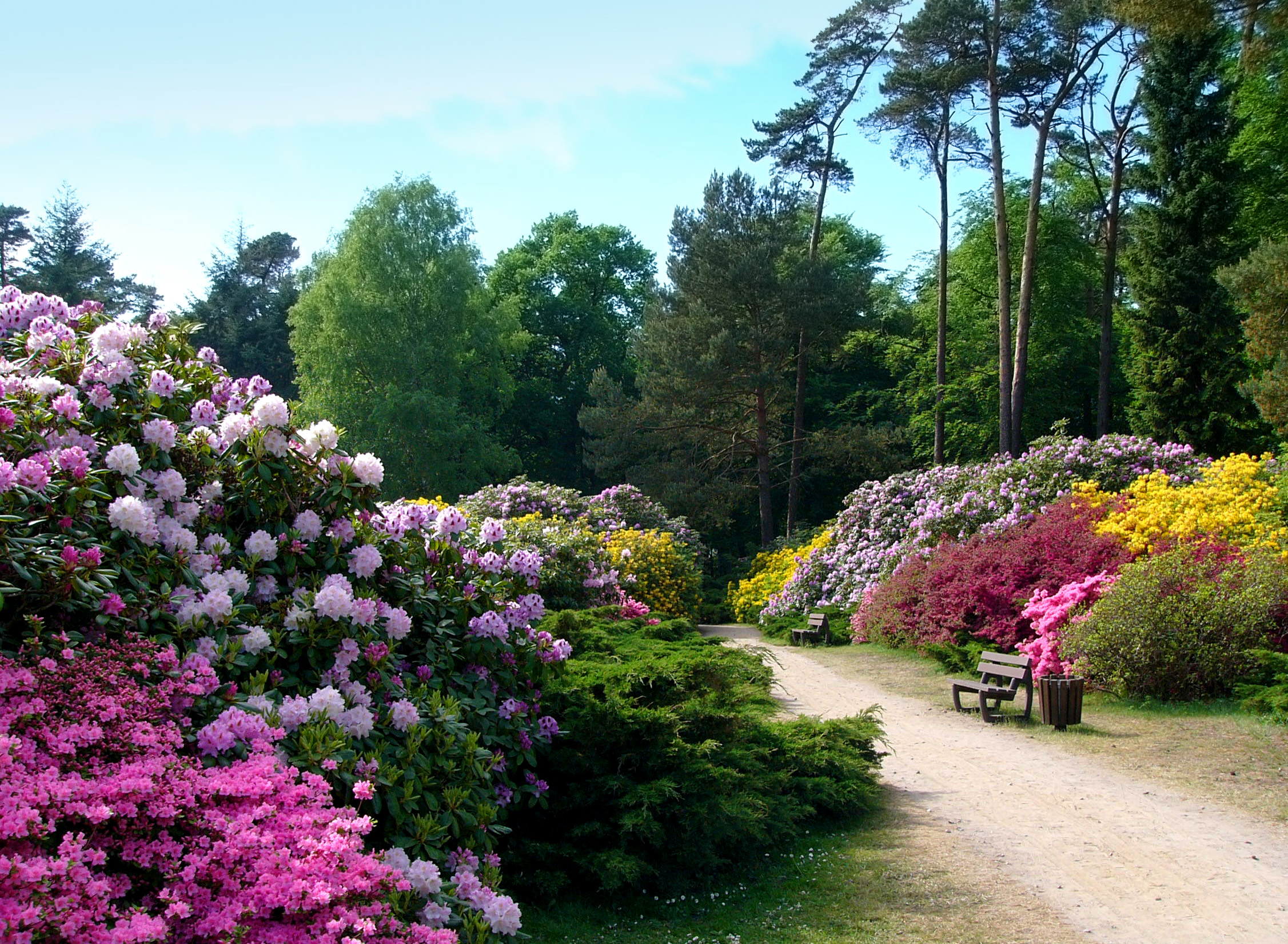
Rhododendron Park

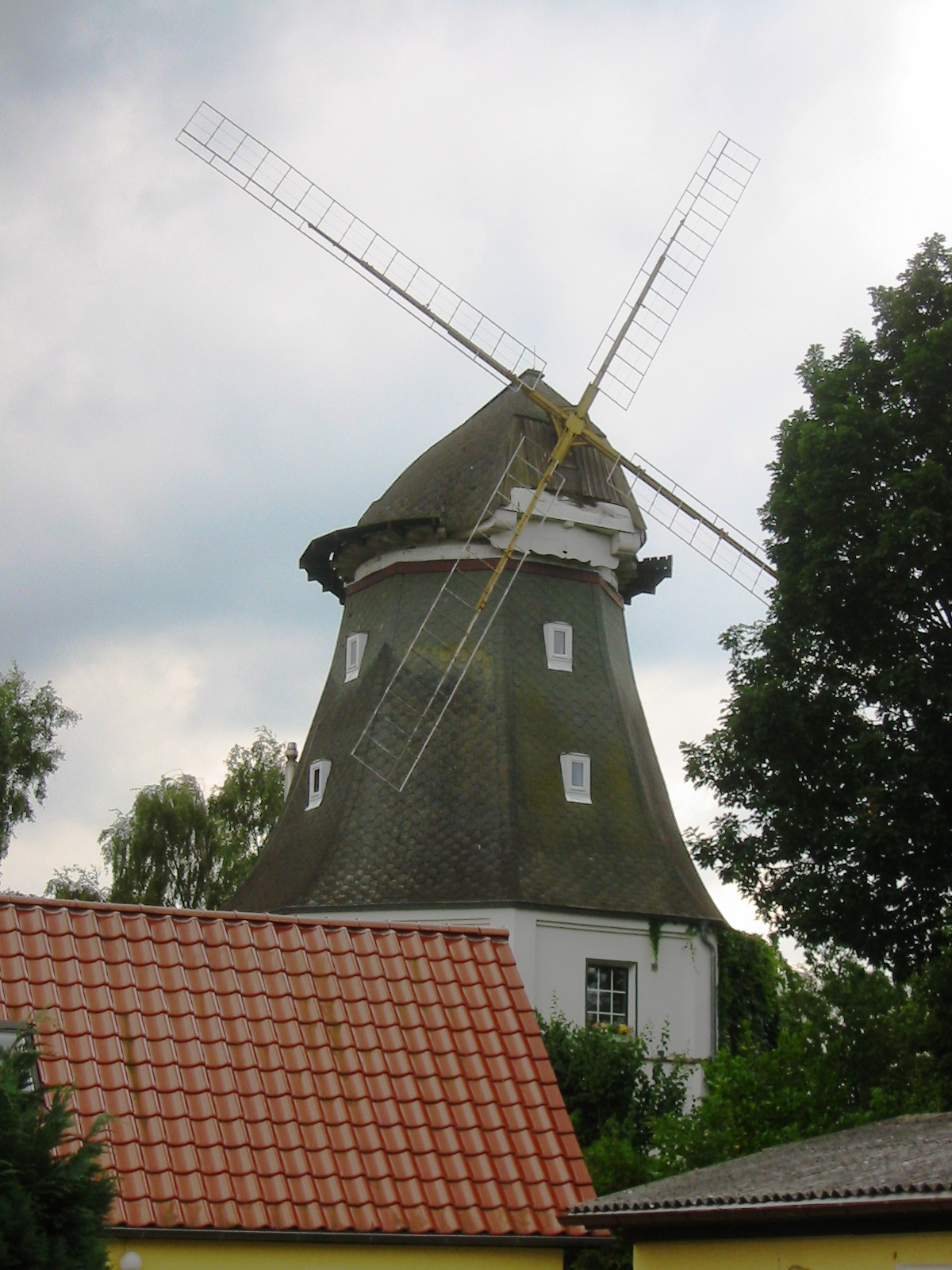
Windmill in Graal-Müritz

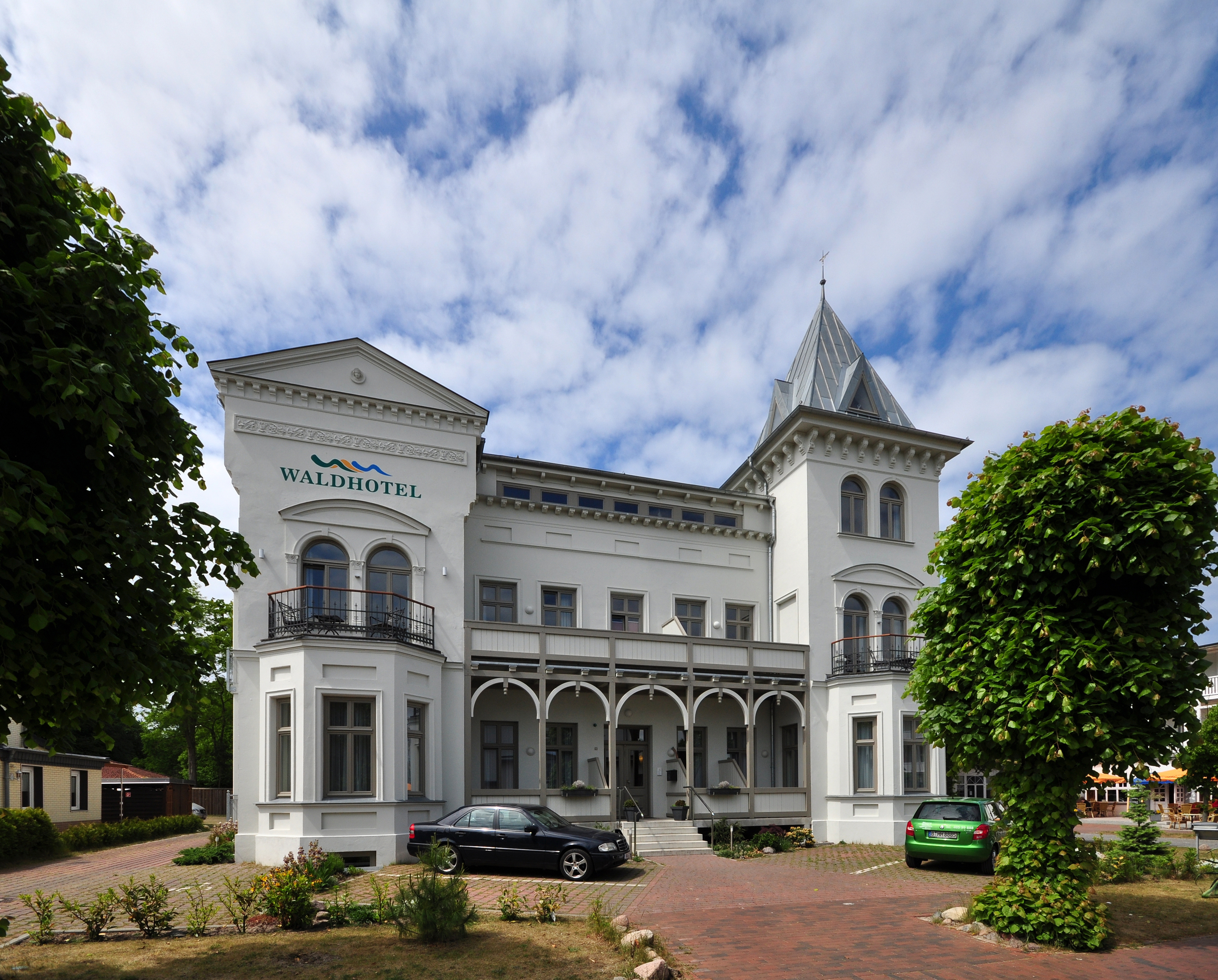
Resort architecture in Graal-Müritz

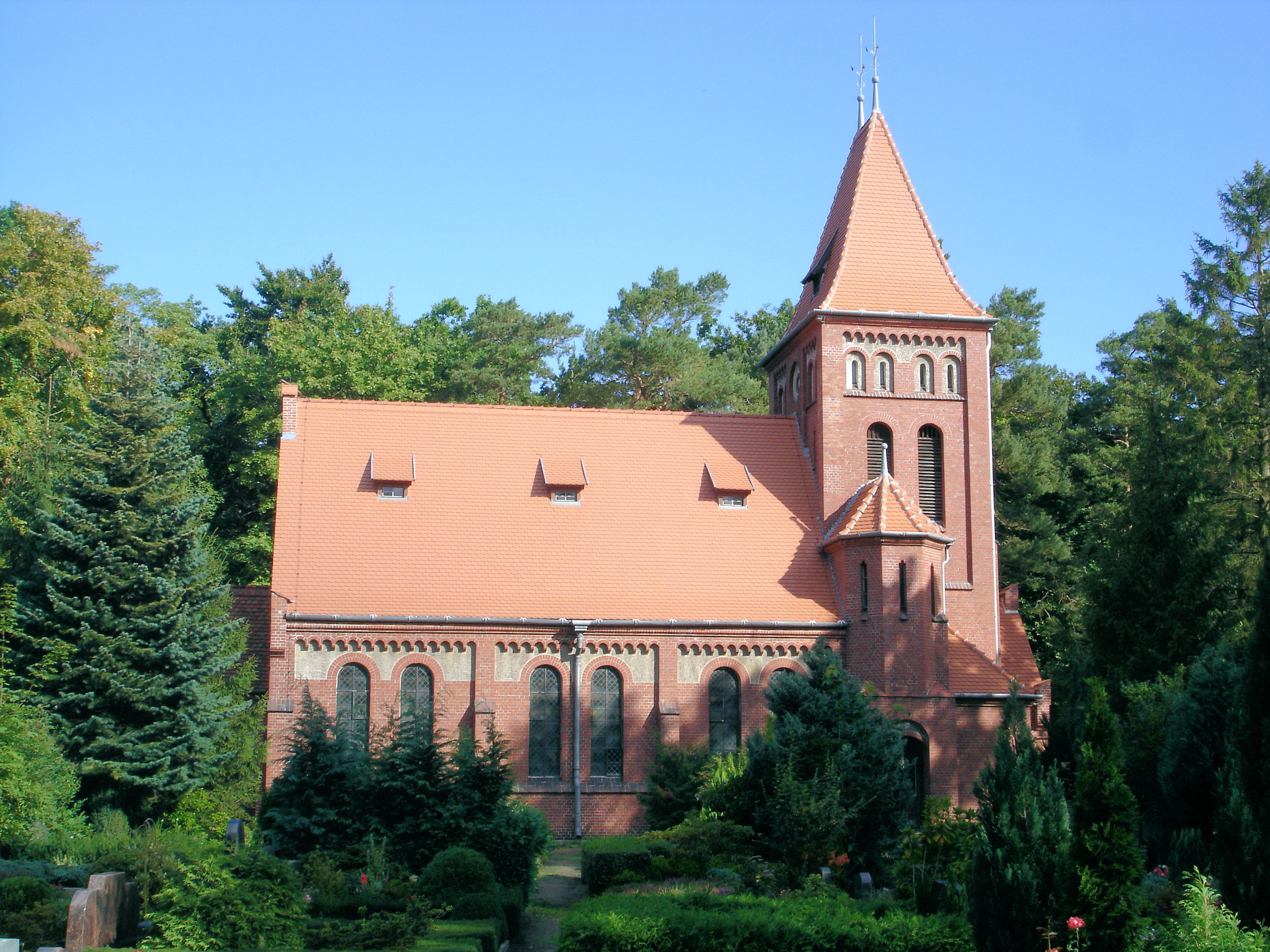
Church
