= List of lakes of Mecklenburg-Vorpommern =

Lakes in the German state Mecklenburg-Vorpommern are:

Lake Name	Elevation	Surface Area
Lostener See	35.9 m (118 ft)	0.22 km^{2} (0.085 sq mi)
Lankower See	45.2 m (148 ft)	0.54 km^{2} (0.21 sq mi)
Bolzer See	31.6 m (104 ft)	0.81 km^{2} (0.31 sq mi)
Borgwallsee	13.2 m (43 ft)	3.89 km^{2} (1.50 sq mi)
Breiter Luzin	84.3 m (277 ft)	3.45 km^{2} (1.33 sq mi)
Bützower See	0.3 m (0.98 ft)	0.98 km^{2} (0.38 sq mi)
Conventer See	−0.1 m (−0.33 ft)	0.91 km^{2} (0.35 sq mi)
Fauler See	39.5 m (130 ft)	0.5 km^{2} (0.19 sq mi)
Flacher See	64.5 m (212 ft)	1.3 km^{2} (0.50 sq mi)
Freesendorfer See	0.1 m (0.33 ft)	0.48 km^{2} (0.19 sq mi)
Friedrichsmoorer Karpfenteiche	35.5 m (116 ft)	3.3 km^{2} (1.3 sq mi)
Grimkesee	30 m (98 ft)	0.038 km^{2} (0.015 sq mi)
Großer Sternberger See	8.6 m (28 ft)	2.5 km^{2} (0.97 sq mi)
Kleine Müritz	62.1 m (204 ft)	4 km^{2} (1.5 sq mi)
Lake Schwerin	37.6 m (123 ft)	61.54 km^{2} (23.76 sq mi)
Lieps	14.8 m (49 ft)	4.31 km^{2} (1.66 sq mi)
Medeweger See	39.4 m (129 ft)	0.95 km^{2} (0.37 sq mi)
Mickowsee	15.3 m (50 ft)	0.61 km^{2} (0.24 sq mi)
Müritz	62 m (203 ft)	117 km^{2} (45 sq mi)
Neumühler See	44 m (144 ft)	1.715 km^{2} (0.662 sq mi)
Parumer See	3.6 m (12 ft)	2.07 km^{2} (0.80 sq mi)
Pinnower See	27.9 m (92 ft)	2.68 km^{2} (1.03 sq mi)
Pinnower Kiessee	38 m (125 ft)	0.42 km^{2} (0.16 sq mi)
Plauer See	62 m (203 ft)	38.4 km^{2} (14.8 sq mi)
Schloonsee	0 m (0 ft)	0.14 km^{2} (0.054 sq mi)
Tollensesee	14.8 m (49 ft)	17.4 km^{2} (6.7 sq mi)

There are many lakes in the Mecklenburgische Seenplatte district, the Ludwigslust-Parchim district, the Nordwestmecklenburg district, and the Rostock district of Mecklenburg-Vorpommern state.
