= List of lakes of Rostock =

Lakes in the Rostock district, Mecklenburg-Vorpommern, Germany are:

Lake Name	Elevation	Surface Area
Brooksee	23.9 m (78 ft)	0.114 km^{2} (0.044 mi^{2})
Duckwitzer See	19.9 m (65 ft)	0.179 km^{2} (0.069 mi^{2})
Groß Upahler See	40.9 m (134 ft)	1.07 km^{2} (0.41 mi^{2})
Großer Peetscher See	2.1 m (6.9 ft)	0.62 km^{2} (0.24 mi^{2})
Großer Teufelssee	37.4 m (123 ft)	0.205 km^{2} (0.079 mi^{2})
Großes Moor	81.8 m (268 ft)	0.055 km^{2} (0.021 mi^{2})
Hohen Sprenzer See	22.9 m (75 ft)	2.25 km^{2} (0.87 mi^{2})
Inselsee	11.4 m (37 ft)	4.58 km^{2} (1.77 mi^{2})
Krakower See	47.6 m (156 ft)	15.07 km^{2} (5.82 mi^{2})
Langsee	50.1 m (164 ft)	0.82 km^{2} (0.32 mi^{2})
Lenzener See	41 m (135 ft)	0.62 km^{2} (0.24 mi^{2})
Radener See	24.4 m (80 ft)	1.2 km^{2} (0.46 mi^{2})
Rühner See	2.8 m (9.2 ft)	1.01 km^{2} (0.39 mi^{2})
Satower See	30.1 m (99 ft)	0.068 km^{2} (0.026 mi^{2})
Sildemower See	13.2 m (43 ft)	0.121 km^{2} (0.047 mi^{2})
Stassower See	35.4 m (116 ft)	0.086 km^{2} (0.033 mi^{2})
Sumpfsee	6 m (20 ft)	1.27 km^{2} (0.49 mi^{2})
Warinsee	23.6 m (77 ft)	1.18 km^{2} (0.46 mi^{2})

== See also ==
- List of lakes in Mecklenburg-Vorpommern
