= Lankower See =

Lankower See may refer to:

- Lankower See (Dechow)
- Lankower See (Schwerin)
