= Kirchsee =

Kirchsee may refer to:

- Kirchsee (Bavaria), a lake in the south German state of Bavaria.
- Kirchsee (Schleswig-Holstein), a lake in the north German state of Schleswig-Holstein.
- Kirchsee (Poel, Mecklenburg-Vorpommern), a bay on the island of Poel in Germany
- Kirchsee (Pinnower See, Mecklenburg-Vorpommern), a bay on the Pinnower See in Germany
