= Langsee =

Langsee or Längsee may refer to:

- Längsee (Kärnten), a lake of Carinthia, Austria
- Längsee (Tyrol), a lake of Tyrol, Austria
- Langsee (Schleswig), a lake in Angeln, Kreis Schleswig-Flensburg, Schleswig-Holstein, Germany
- Langsee (Mecklenburg), a lake in the Rostock district in Mecklenburg-Vorpommern, Germany
