= Krakow am See =

Town in Mecklenburg-Vorpommern, Germany

- Town
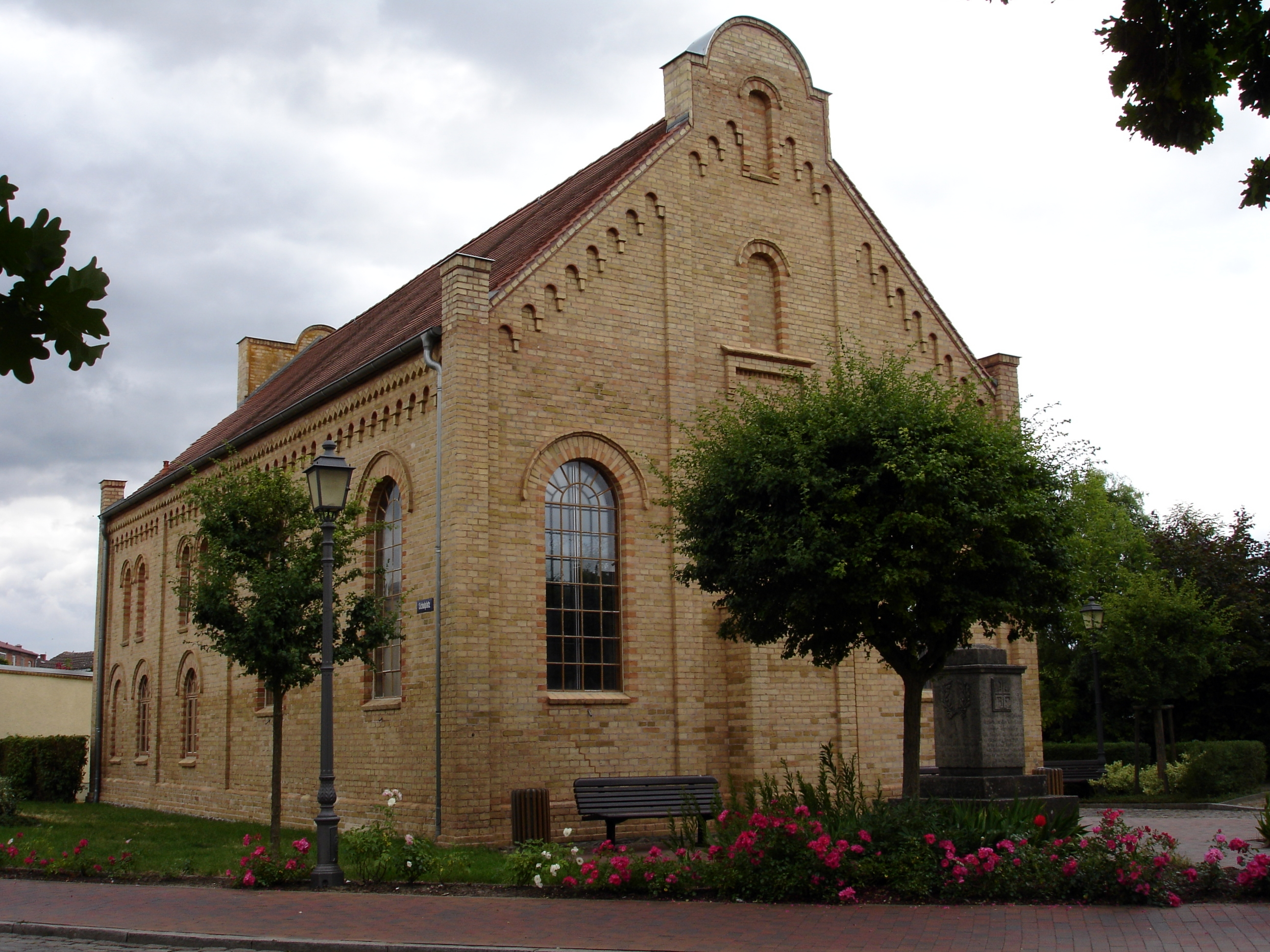
- Former synagogue

- Coat of arms

- Location of Krakow am See within Rostock district
- Interactive map of Krakow am See
- Location within Germany Location within Mecklenburg-Vorpommern
- Coordinates: 53°39′N 12°16′E
- Country: Germany
- State: Mecklenburg-Vorpommern
- District: Rostock
- Municipal assoc.: Krakow am See

Government
  - Mayor: Wolfgang Geistert

Area
  - Total: 87.37 km^{2} (33.73 sq mi)
- Elevation: 50 m (160 ft)

Population (2025-12-31)
  - Total: 3,286
  - Density: 37.61/km^{2} (97.41/sq mi)
- Time zone: UTC+01:00 (CET)
  - Summer (DST): UTC+02:00 (CEST)
- Postal codes: 18292
- Dialling codes: 038457
- Vehicle registration: LRO
- Website: www.krakow-am-see.de

Krakow am See (German pronunciation: [ˈkʁaːkoː ʔam ˈzeː], lit. 'Krakow on the Lake') is a municipality in the Rostock district, in Mecklenburg-Western Pomerania, Germany.

It is situated 18 kilometres (11 miles) southeast of Güstrow at lake Krakower See

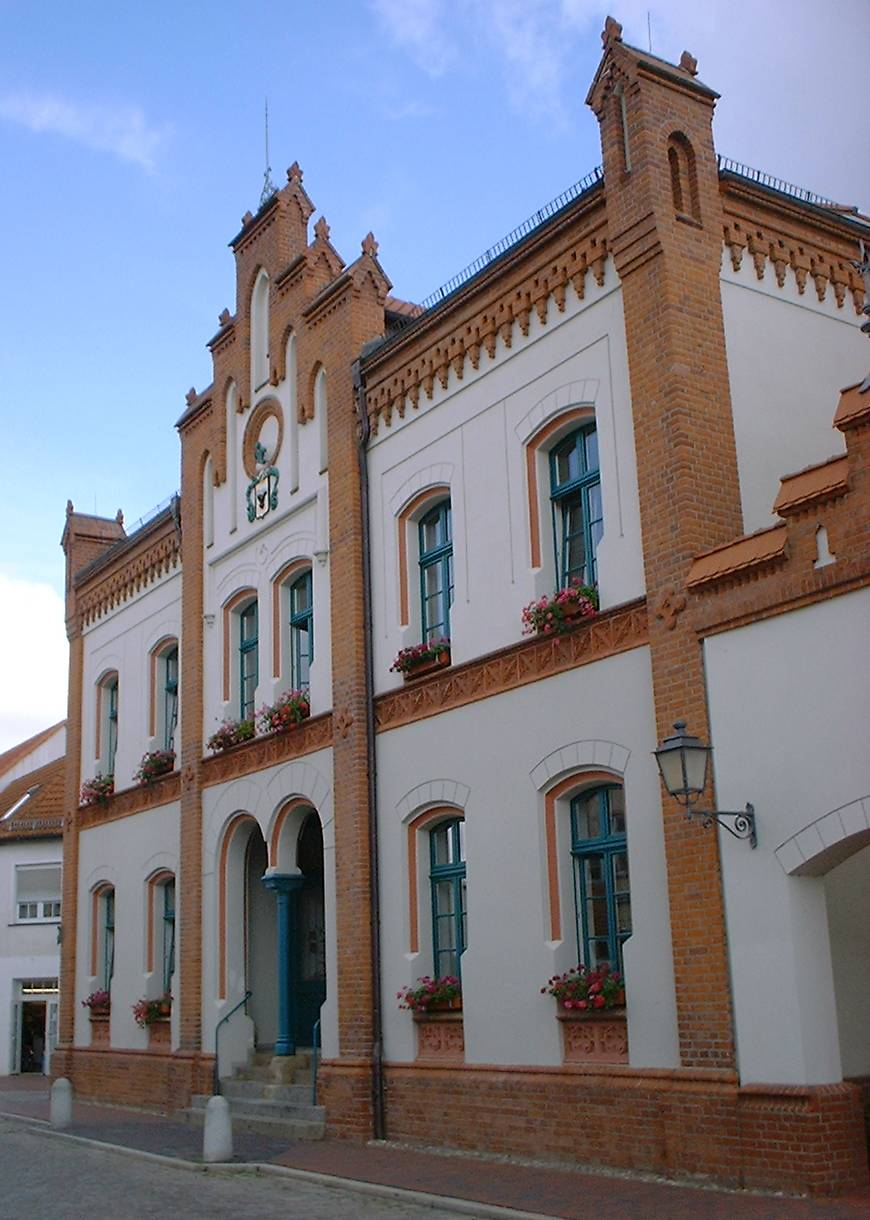
Town hall in Krakow am See

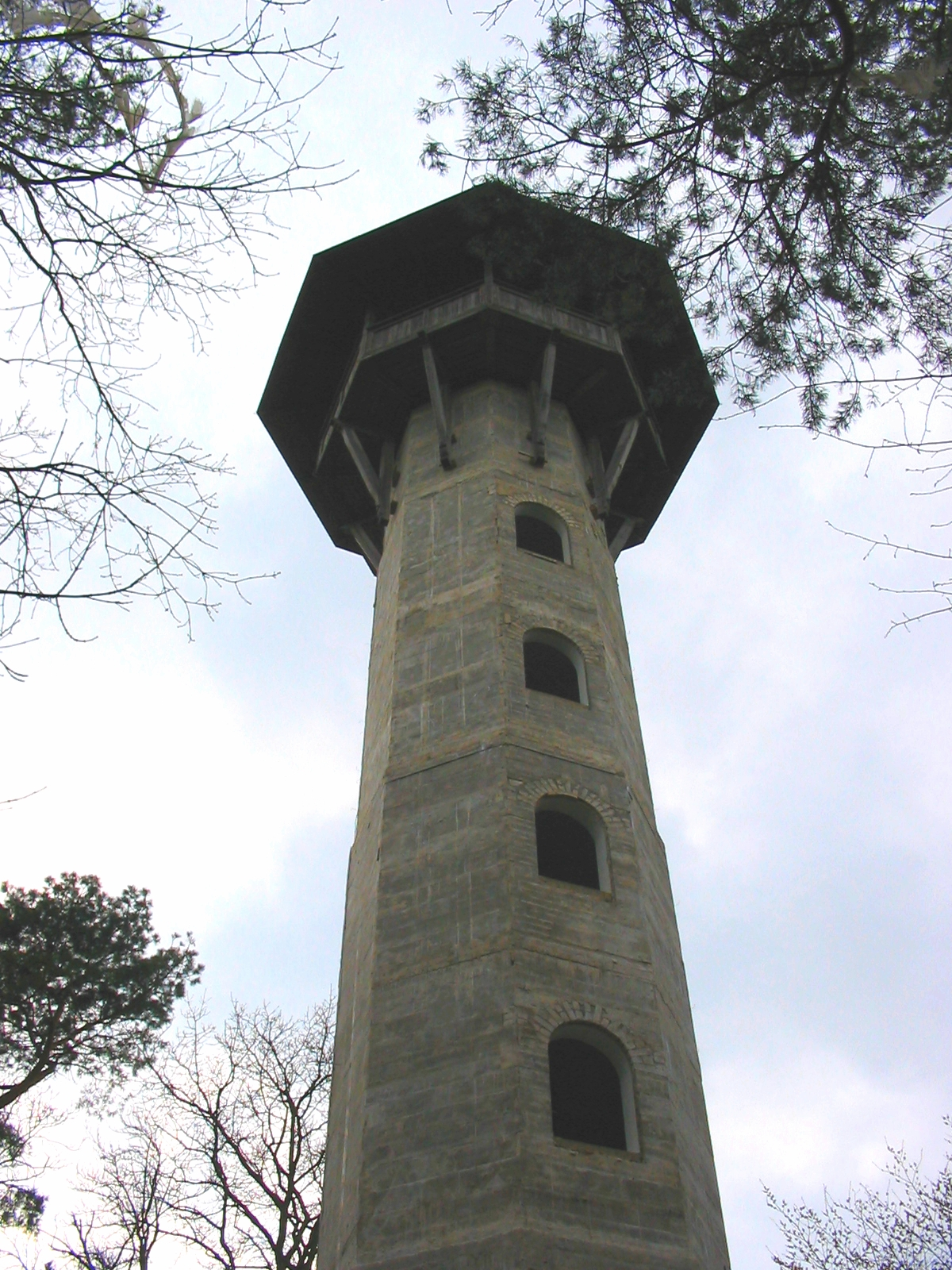
Observation tower in Jörnberg

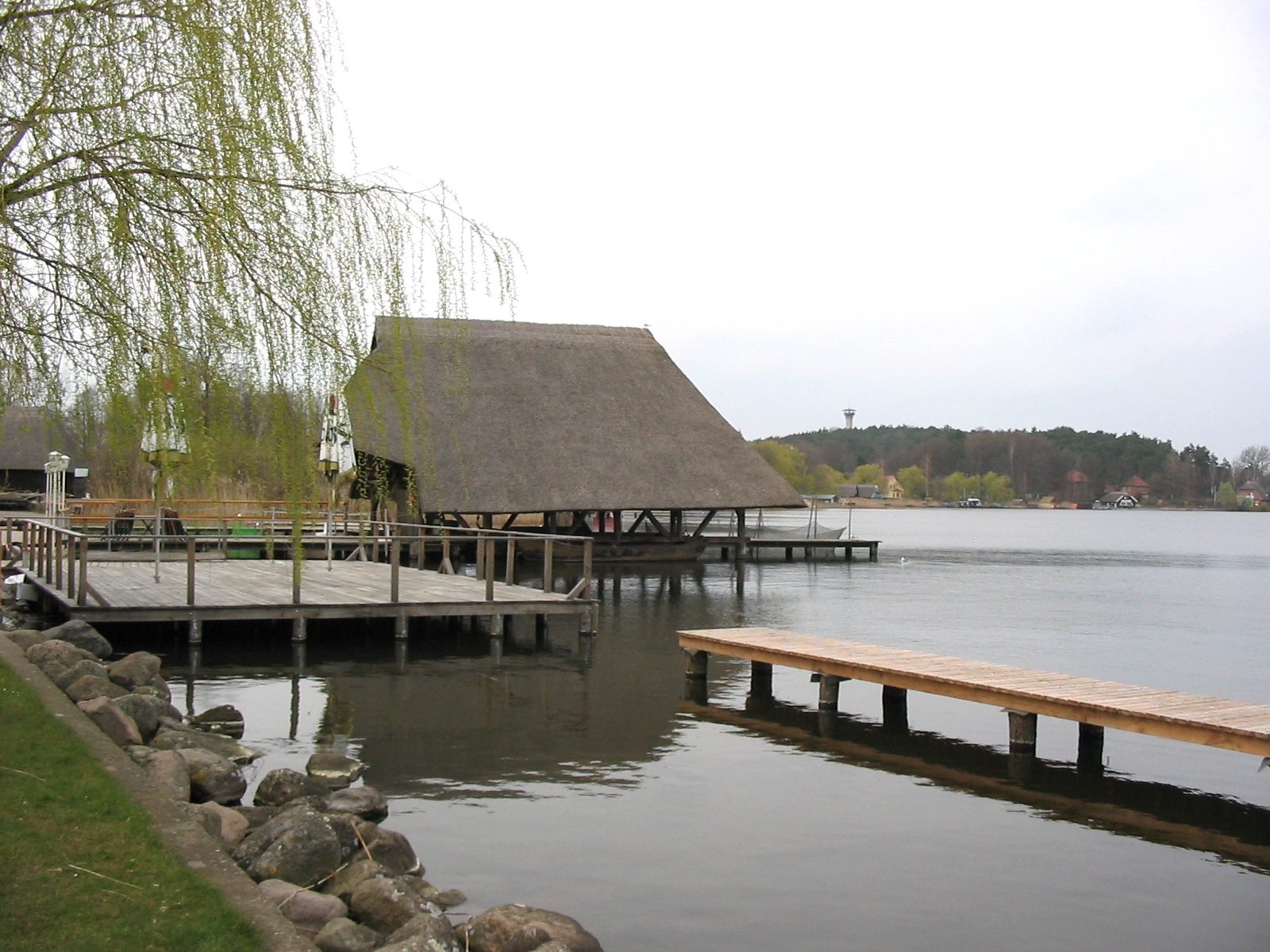
Krakower See

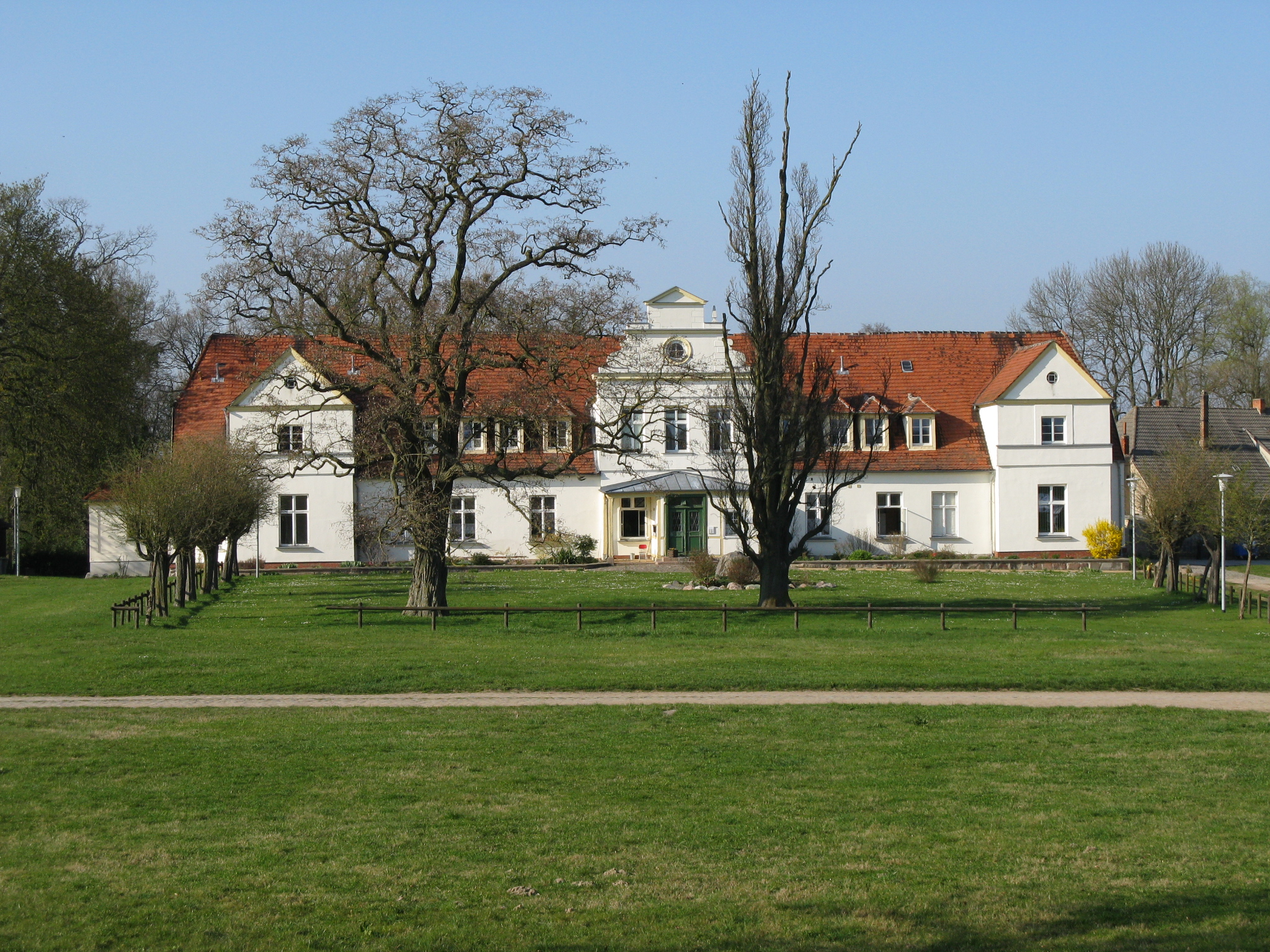
Groß Grabow manor house
