= Flacher See =

Lake in Mecklenburg-Vorpommern, Germany

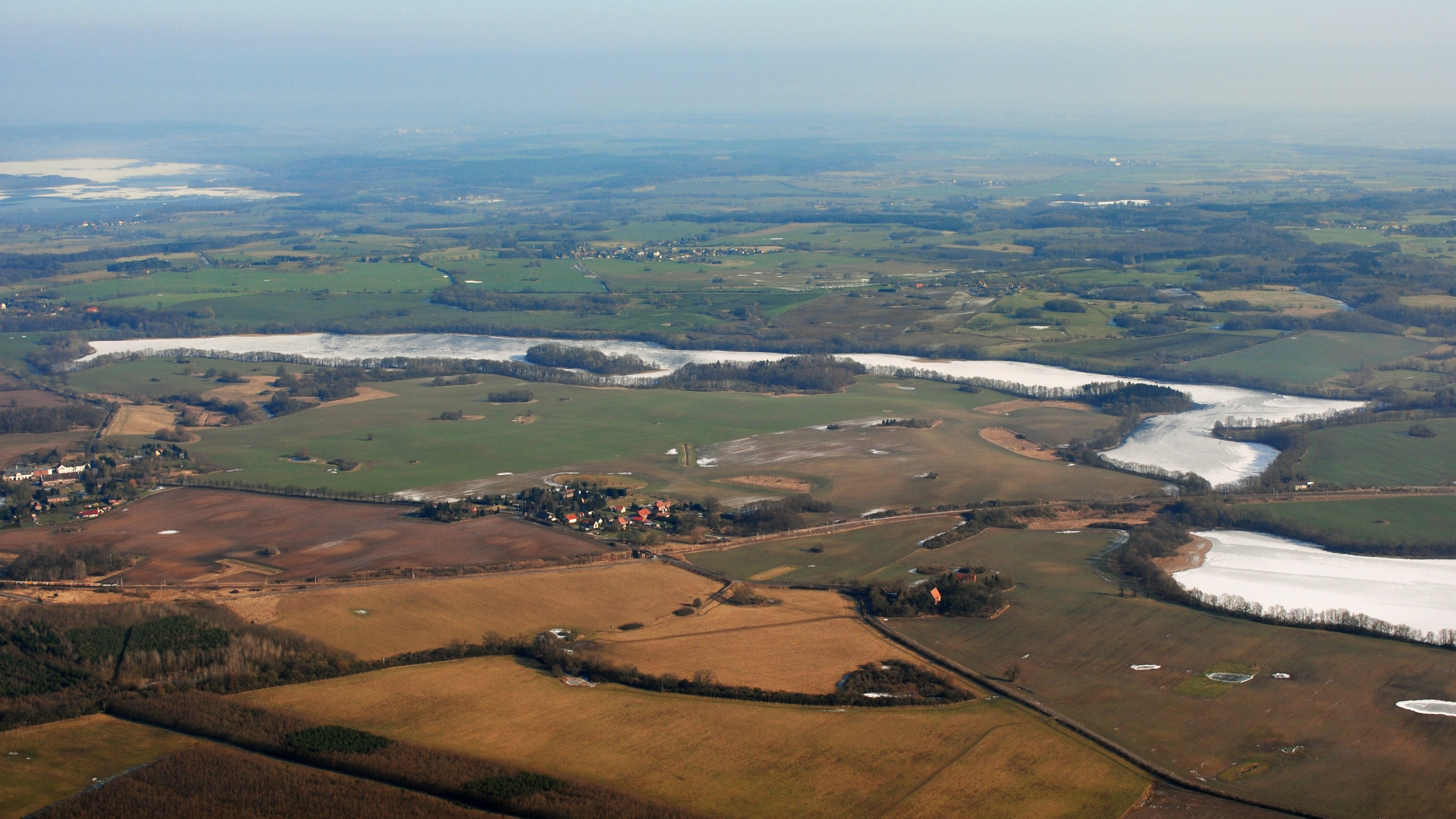

- Location within Mecklenburg-Vorpommern
- Location: Klocksin, Mecklenburg-Vorpommern, Germany
- Coordinates: 53°37′22″N 12°32′25″E
- Basin countries: Germany
- Surface area: 1.3 km^{2} (0.50 sq mi)
- Average depth: 9.7 m (32 ft)
- Max. depth: 31.9 m (105 ft)
- Surface elevation: 64.5 m (212 ft)

Flacher See is a lake in Klocksin, Mecklenburg-Vorpommern, Germany. At an elevation of 64.5 m (212 ft), its surface area is 1.3 km (0.81 mi).
