= Lostener See =

Lake in Germany

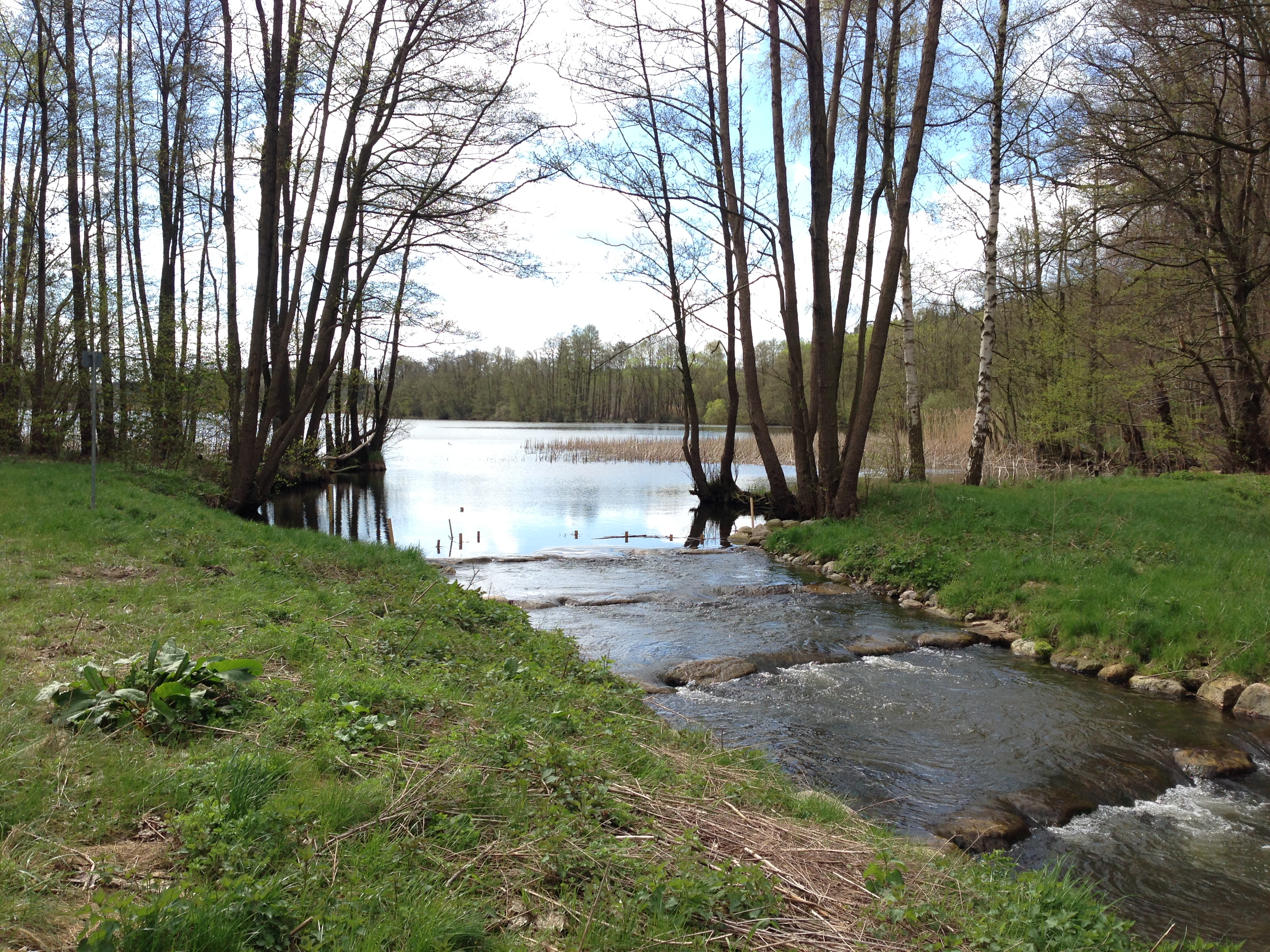
- Lostener See, Wallensteingraben with fish ladder near Losten.

- Location within Mecklenburg-Vorpommern
- Location: West Mecklenburg, Mecklenburg-Vorpommern
- Coordinates: 53°47′39″N 11°29′18″E
- Primary inflows: Wallensteingraben
- Primary outflows: Wallensteingraben
- Basin countries: Germany
- Surface area: 0.22 km^{2} (0.085 sq mi)
- Surface elevation: 35.9 m (118 ft)

The Lostener See is a lake located in West Mecklenburg, Mecklenburg-Vorpommern, Germany.It lies at an elevation of 35.9 meters and has a surface area of 0.22 square kilometer.
