= Middle Mecklenburg =

The region of Middle Mecklenburg (German: Mittleres Mecklenburg) represents that area of the German state of Mecklenburg-Vorpommern with the most developed infrastructure in a state that is otherwise rather underdeveloped structurally. Middle (or Central) Mecklenburg includes the largest urban centre in the state, the Hanseatic city of Rostock with its 200,000 inhabitants together with the surrounding district of the same name. The most important river in the region is the Warnow. Its transport links radiate from Rostock in a star configuration and the metropolitan region of the port city is served by a public transport network that includes the Rostock S-Bahn. Other important centres are the county towns of Bad Doberan and Güstrow. The main tourist attraction is the Baltic Sea coast along the Bay of Mecklenburg with the Salzhaff, the sea cliffs and the seaside resorts of Rerik, Kühlungsborn, Heiligendamm, Warnemünde and Graal-Müritz. In the south Middle Mecklenburg transitions into the naturally very unspoilt region of the Mecklenburg Lake District. In the east the River Recknitz forms its boundary with West Pomerania, in the west it merges gradually into West Mecklenburg.

== District reorganisation ==
Based on the decision by the state parliament (the Landtag) on 5 April 2006, a new major district called Mittleres Mecklenburg-Rostock (Middle Mecklenburg-Rostock) was to be created on 1 October 2009 with Rostock as the county seat. This district was to incorporate the former districts of Bad Doberan and Güstrow, as well as the hitherto independent city of Rostock. However, a judgement by the state constitutional court on 26 July 2007 the reform act could not be carried out in the way planned as it was incompatible with the state constitution. Instead the 2011 district reform in Mecklenburg-Vorpommern saw the districts of Bad Doberan and Güstrow combined into the new district or county of Rostock with its county headquarters in Güstrow.
