= Pinnower Kiessee =

Lake in Germany

- Location within Mecklenburg-Vorpommern
- Location: Mecklenburg-Vorpommern
- Coordinates: 53°35′46.96″N 11°33′37.31″E
- Primary inflows: none
- Primary outflows: none
- Basin countries: Germany
- Surface area: 42 ha (100 acres)
- Surface elevation: 38 m (125 ft)

The Pinnower Kiessee was created by the accumulation of groundwater in a gravel pit in the municipal area of the Ludwigslust-Parchim district in Mecklenburg-Vorpommern. The lake lies about ten kilometers southeast of Schwerin and 1.3 kilometers from the eastern shore of Lake Pinnower. Inflow and outflow do not exist. Currently (2008), the lake measures 1.2 km in length and up to 530 meters in width. Each year, more than half a million tons of gravel and sand are removed.
