= Groß Upahler See =

Lake in Mecklenburg-Vorpommern, Germany

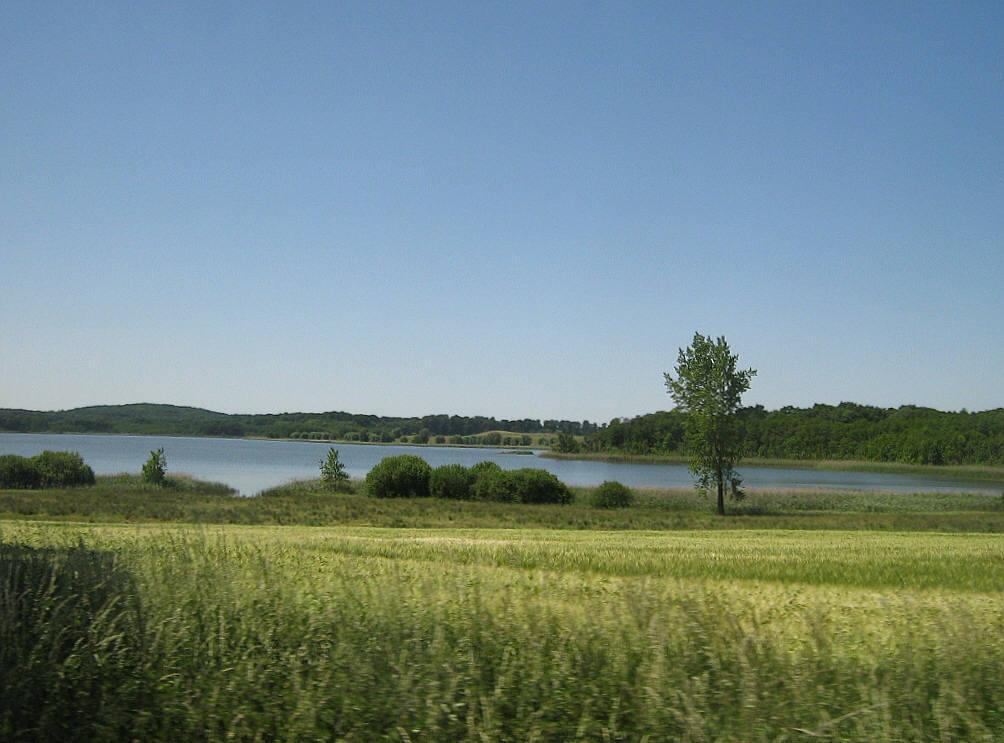

- Location within Mecklenburg-Vorpommern
- Location: Rostock, Mecklenburg-Vorpommern
- Coordinates: 53°42′58″N 12°02′58″E
- Basin countries: Germany
- Surface area: 1.07 km^{2} (0.41 sq mi)
- Average depth: 2.2 m (7 ft 3 in)
- Max. depth: 4.5 m (15 ft)
- Surface elevation: 40.9 m (134 ft)

Groß Upahler See is a lake in the Rostock district in Mecklenburg-Vorpommern, Germany. At an elevation of 40.9 m, its surface area is 1.07 km^{2}.
