= Warinsee =

Lake in Germany

- Location within Mecklenburg-Vorpommern
- Location: Rostock, Mecklenburg-Vorpommern
- Coordinates: 53°46′49.33″N 12°22′50.02″E
- Primary inflows: Aalbach, Grenzgraben
- Primary outflows: Aalbach, also known as Lößnitz (Nebel)
- Basin countries: Germany
- Max. length: 2 km (1.2 mi)
- Max. width: 0.7 km (0.43 mi)
- Surface area: 1.18 km^{2} (0.46 sq mi)
- Surface elevation: 23.6 m (77 ft)

Warinsee is a lake in the Rostock district in Mecklenburg-Vorpommern, Germany. At an elevation of 23.6 m, its surface area is 1.18 km².
