= Brooksee =

Lake in Mecklenburg-Vorpommern, Germany

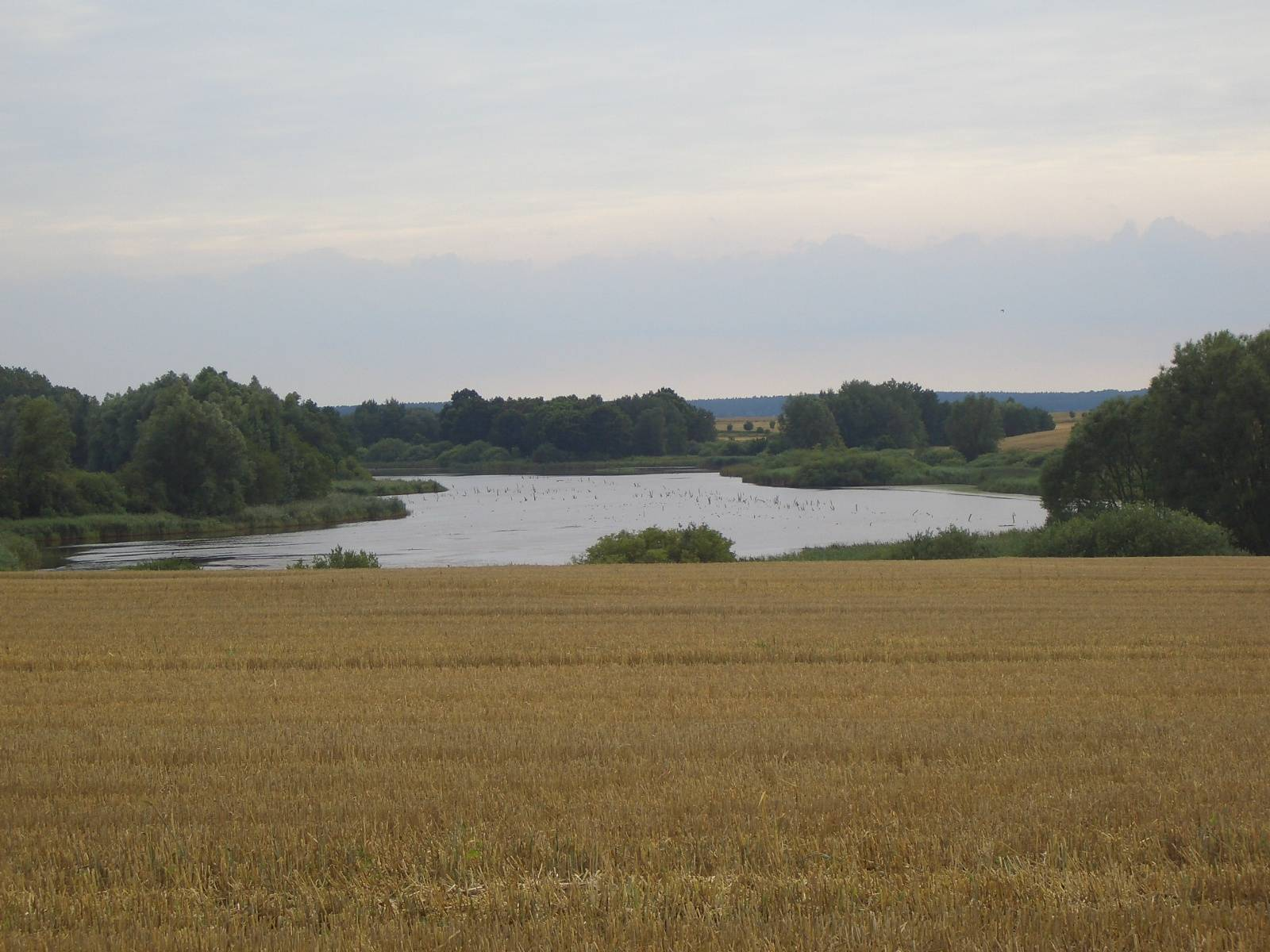

- Location within Mecklenburg-Vorpommern
- Location: Rostock, Mecklenburg-Vorpommern
- Coordinates: 53.9742°N 12.07952°E
- Basin countries: Germany
- Surface area: 0.114 km^{2} (0.044 sq mi)
- Surface elevation: 23.9 m (78 ft)

Brooksee is a lake in the Rostock district in Mecklenburg-Vorpommern, Germany. At an elevation of 23.9 m, its surface area is 0.114 km².
