= Lenzener See =

Lake in Germany

- Location within Mecklenburg-Vorpommern
- Location: Rostock, Ludwigslust-Parchim, Mecklenburg-Vorpommern
- Coordinates: 53°42′57″N 12°00′56″E
- Primary outflows: unnamed
- Basin countries: Germany
- Surface area: 0.62 km^{2} (0.24 sq mi)
- Surface elevation: 41 m (135 ft)

Lenzener See (also Lenzer See) is a lake in the Rostock district in Ludwigslust-Parchim, Mecklenburg-Vorpommern, Germany. At an elevation of 41 m, its surface area is 0.62 km².
