= Krakower See =

Lake in Mecklenburg-Vorpommern, Germany

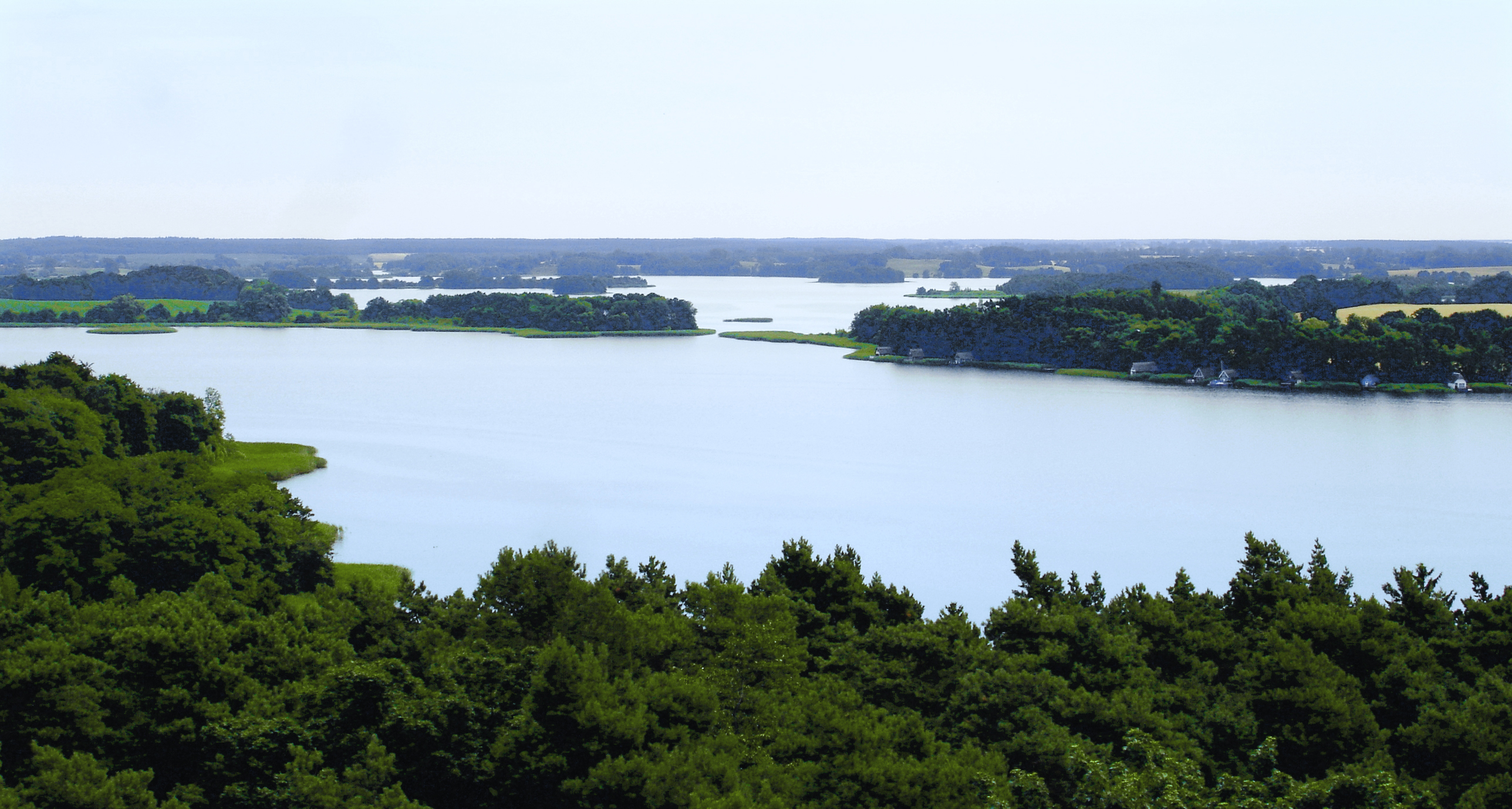

- Location within Mecklenburg-Vorpommern
- Location: Rostock, Mecklenburg-Vorpommern
- Coordinates: 53°37′52″N 12°17′51″E
- Primary inflows: Nebel
- Primary outflows: Nebel
- Basin countries: Germany
- Surface area: 15.07 km^{2} (5.82 sq mi)
- Average depth: 7.4 m (24 ft)
- Max. depth: 28.3 m (93 ft)
- Surface elevation: 47.6 m (156 ft)

Krakower See (German pronunciation: [ˈkʁaːkoːɐ ˈzeː], lit. 'Krakow Lake') is a lake in the Rostock district in Mecklenburg-Vorpommern, Germany. At an elevation of 47.6 m, its surface area is 15.07 km^{2}.
