= Mickowsee =

Lake in Germany

- Location within Mecklenburg-Vorpommern
- Location: Mecklenburg-Vorpommern
- Coordinates: 53°42′12″N 11°37′38″E
- Primary inflows: Warnow
- Primary outflows: Warnow
- Basin countries: Germany
- Surface area: 0.61 km^{2} (0.24 sq mi)
- Average depth: 0.7 m (2 ft 4 in)
- Max. depth: 2.1 m (6 ft 11 in)
- Surface elevation: 15.3 m (50 ft)

Mickowsee is a lake in Mecklenburg-Vorpommern, Germany. At an elevation of 15.3 m, its surface area is 0.61 km^{2} (0.24 sq mi).
