= Medeweger See =

Lake in Mecklenburg-Vorpommern, Germany

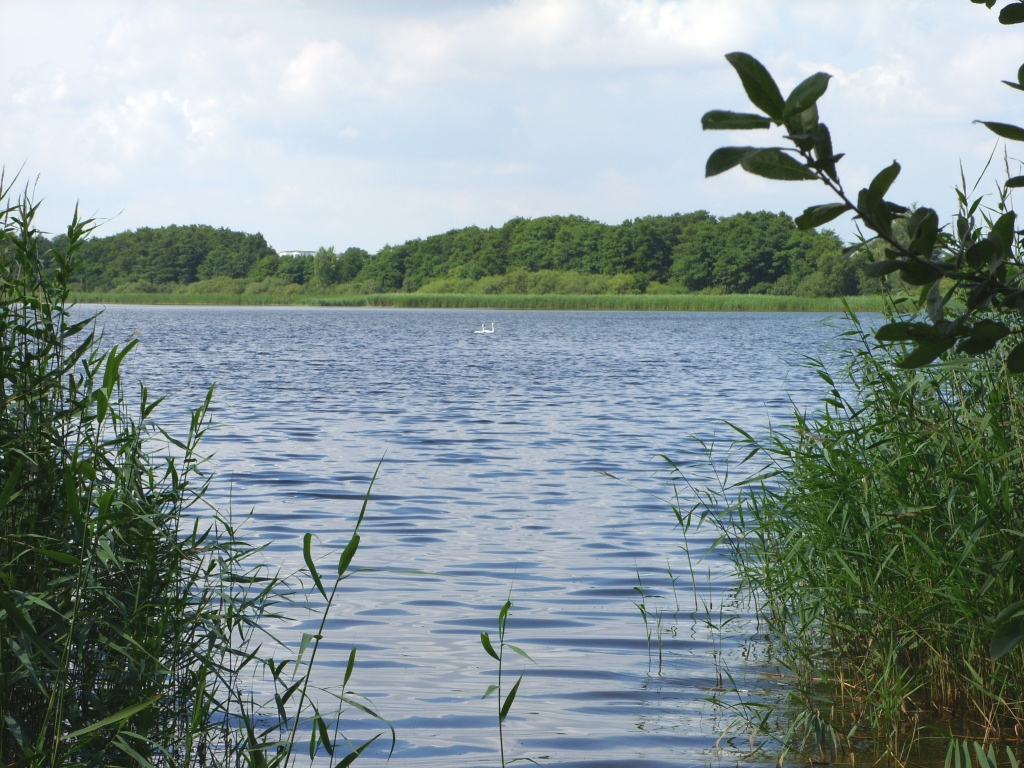

- Location within Mecklenburg-Vorpommern
- Location: Mecklenburg-Vorpommern
- Coordinates: 53°39′25″N 11°23′21″E
- Primary inflows: Aubach
- Primary outflows: Aubach
- Basin countries: Germany
- Surface area: 0.95 km^{2} (0.37 sq mi)
- Average depth: 10.7 m (35 ft)
- Max. depth: 28.2 m (93 ft)
- Water volume: 10,160,000 m^{3} (359,000,000 cu ft)
- Surface elevation: 39.4 m (129 ft)
- Settlements: Klein Medewege, Ortsteil von Schwerin

Medeweger See is a lake in Mecklenburg-Vorpommern, Germany. At an elevation of 39.4 m, its surface area is 0.95 km².
