= Klocksin =

- Municipality
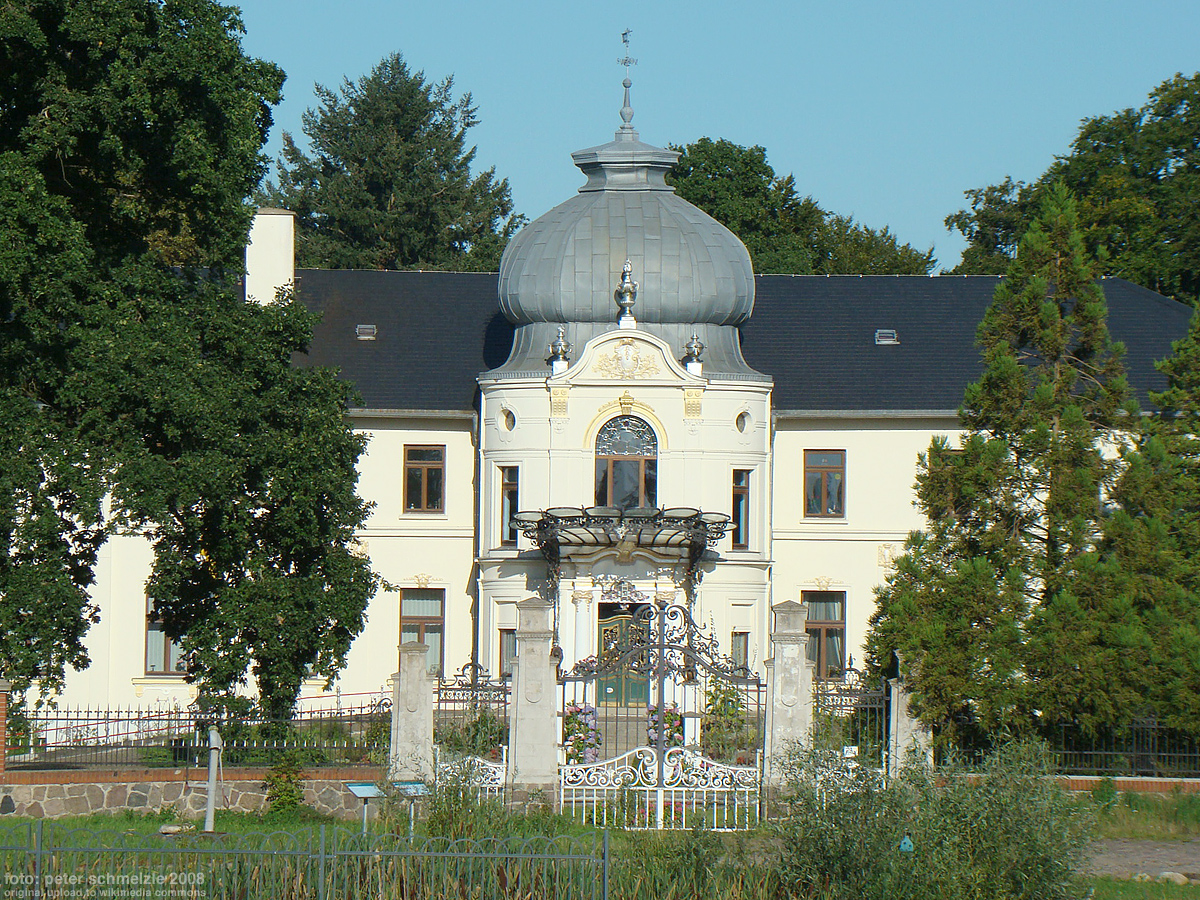
- Schloss Blücherhof in Klocksin

- Location of Klocksin within Mecklenburgische Seenplatte district
- Interactive map of Klocksin
- Location within Germany Location within Mecklenburg-Vorpommern
- Coordinates: 53°38′13″N 12°32′28″E
- Country: Germany
- State: Mecklenburg-Vorpommern
- District: Mecklenburgische Seenplatte
- Municipal assoc.: Seenlandschaft Waren

Government
  - Mayor: Angela Schütze

Area
  - Total: 23.90 km^{2} (9.23 sq mi)
- Elevation: 68 m (223 ft)

Population (2025-12-31)
  - Total: 327
  - Density: 13.7/km^{2} (35.4/sq mi)
- Time zone: UTC+01:00 (CET)
  - Summer (DST): UTC+02:00 (CEST)
- Postal codes: 17194
- Dialling codes: 039933
- Vehicle registration: MSE, MÜR
- Website: www.amt-slw.de

Klocksin is a municipality in the Mecklenburgische Seenplatte district, in Mecklenburg-Western Pomerania, Germany.
