= Grimkesee =

Lake in Schwerin, Mecklenburg-Vorpommern, Germany

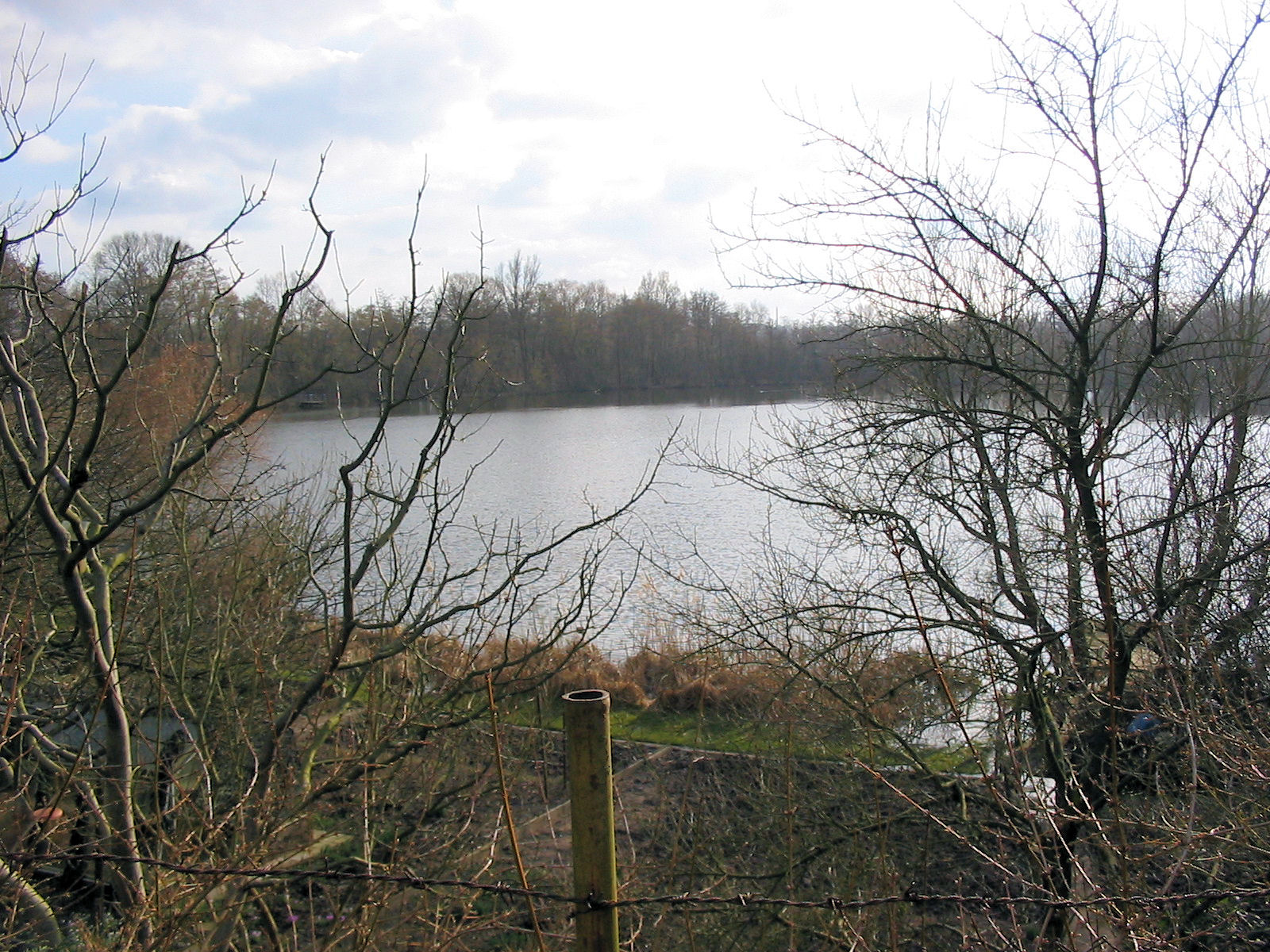

- Location within Mecklenburg-Vorpommern
- Location: Schwerin, Mecklenburg-Vorpommern
- Coordinates: 53°37′17″N 11°23′38″E
- Basin countries: Germany
- Surface area: 0.038 km^{2} (0.015 sq mi)
- Average depth: 2 m (6 ft 7 in)
- Max. depth: 4 m (13 ft)
- Surface elevation: ca. 40 m (130 ft)
- Settlements: Schwerin

Grimkesee is a lake in Schwerin, Mecklenburg-Vorpommern, Germany. At an elevation of ca. 40 m, its surface area is 0.038 km^{2}.
