= Fauler See =

Lake in Mecklenburg-Vorpommern, Germany

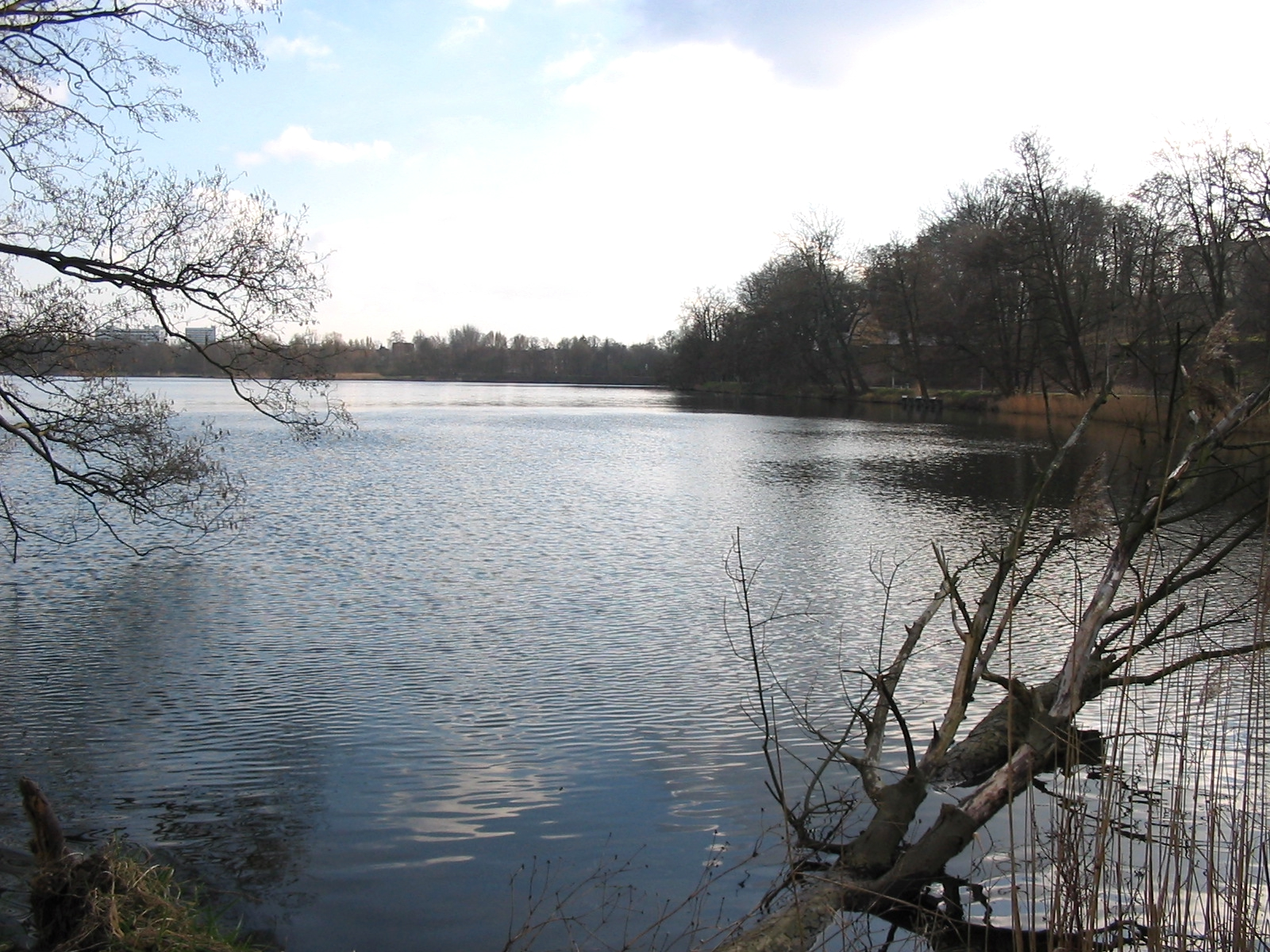

- Location within Mecklenburg-Vorpommern
- Location: Schwerin, Mecklenburg-Vorpommern
- Coordinates: 53.61°N 11.43°E
- Basin countries: Germany
- Surface area: 0.5 km^{2} (0.19 sq mi)
- Average depth: 5.8 m (19 ft)
- Max. depth: 11.2 m (37 ft)
- Surface elevation: 39.5 m (130 ft)
- Settlements: Schwerin

Fauler See (German pronunciation: [ˈfaʊ̯lɐ zeː]) is a lake in Schwerin, Mecklenburg-Vorpommern, Germany. At an elevation of 39.5 m, its surface area is 0.5 km².
