= Lankower See (Dechow) =

Lake in Mecklenburg-Vorpommern, Germany

- Location within Mecklenburg-Vorpommern
- Location: Nordwestmecklenburg, Mecklenburg-Vorpommern
- Coordinates: 53°42′00″N 10°51′00″E
- Primary inflows: channel
- Primary outflows: Wetingsbeker Graben
- Basin countries: Germany
- Surface area: 0.916 km^{2} (0.354 sq mi)
- Surface elevation: 42.5 m (139 ft)

Lankower See (Dechow) is a lake in the Nordwestmecklenburg district in Mecklenburg-Vorpommern, Germany. At an elevation of 42.5 m (139 ft), its surface area is 0.916 km^{2} (0.354 sq mi).
