= Sildemower See =

Lake in Germany

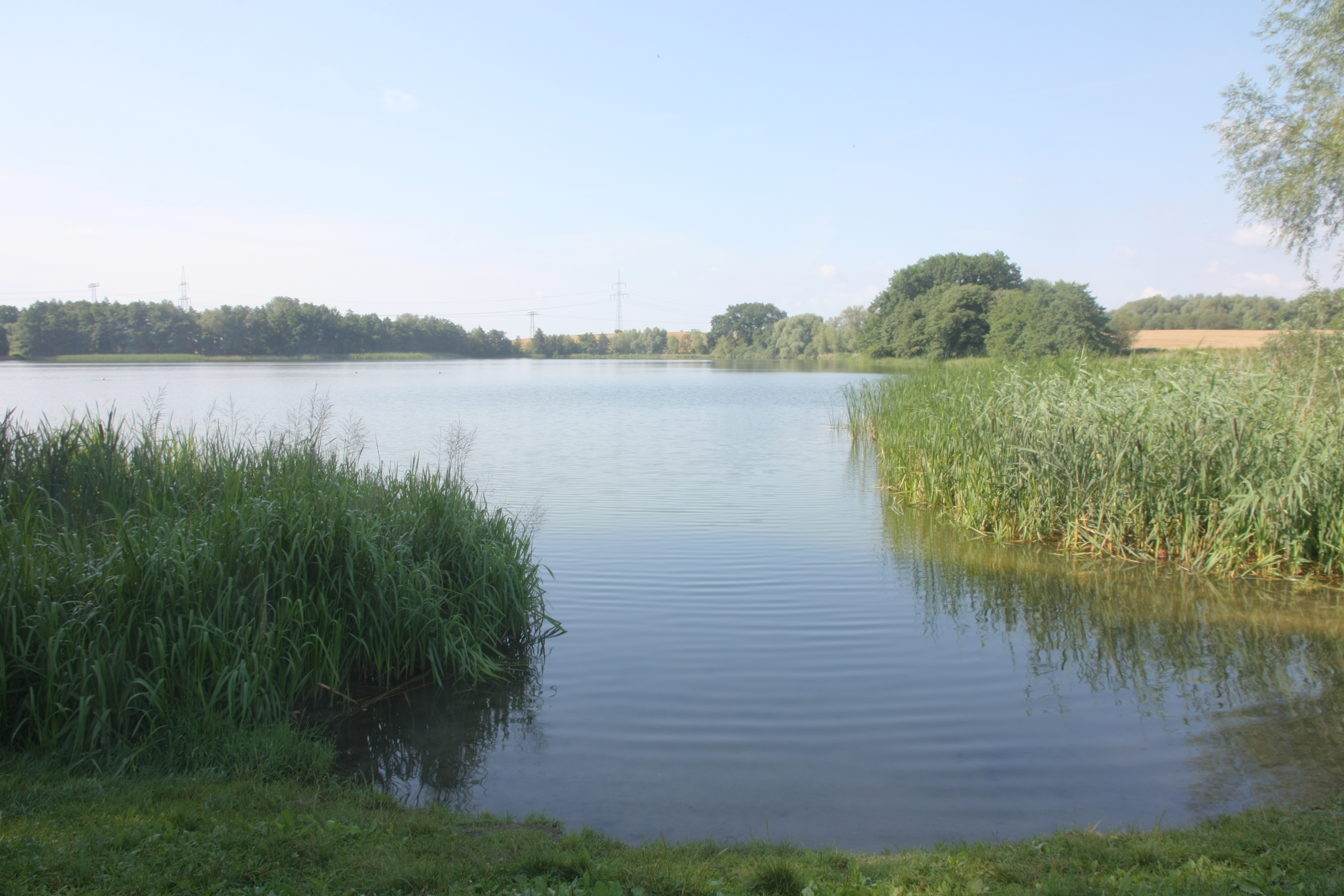

- Location within Mecklenburg-Vorpommern
- Location: Rostock, Mecklenburg-Vorpommern
- Coordinates: 54.04825°N 12.13673°E
- Basin countries: Germany
- Surface area: 0.121 km^{2} (0.047 sq mi)
- Surface elevation: 13.2 m (43 ft)

Sildemower See is a lake in the Rostock district in Mecklenburg-Vorpommern, Germany. At an elevation of 13.2 m, its surface area is 0.121 km^{2}.
