= Duckwitzer See =

Lake in Mecklenburg-Vorpommern, Germany

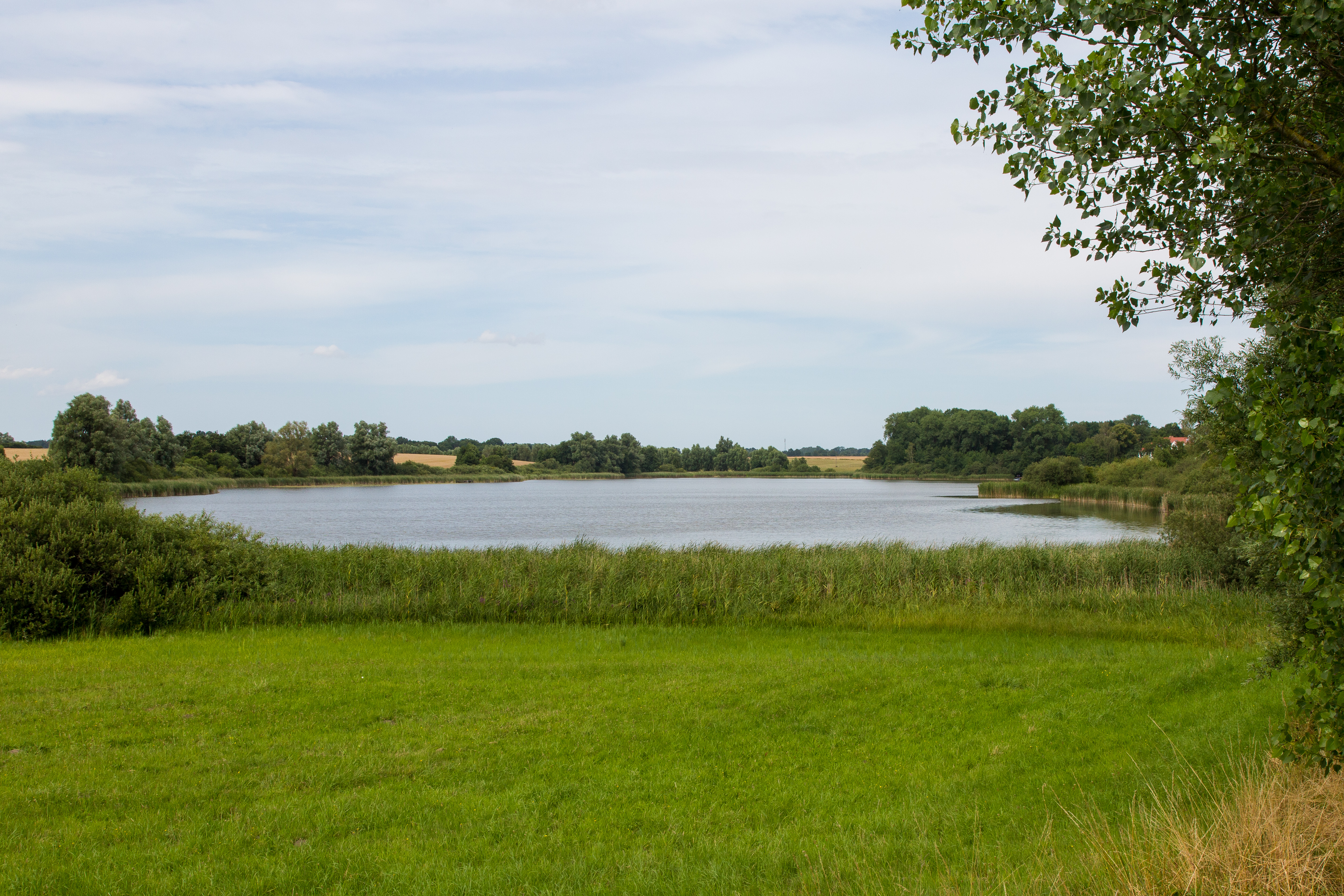
- Duckwitzer See, view from south

- Location within Mecklenburg-Vorpommern
- Location: Rostock, Mecklenburg-Vorpommern
- Coordinates: 53.99415°N 12.5824°E
- Basin countries: Germany
- Surface area: 0.179 km^{2} (0.069 sq mi)
- Surface elevation: 19.9 m (65 ft)

Duckwitzer See is a lake in the Rostock district in Mecklenburg-Vorpommern, Germany. At an elevation of 19.9 m, its surface area is 0.179 km².
