= Bolzer See =

Lake in Mustin, Mecklenburg-Vorpommern, Germany

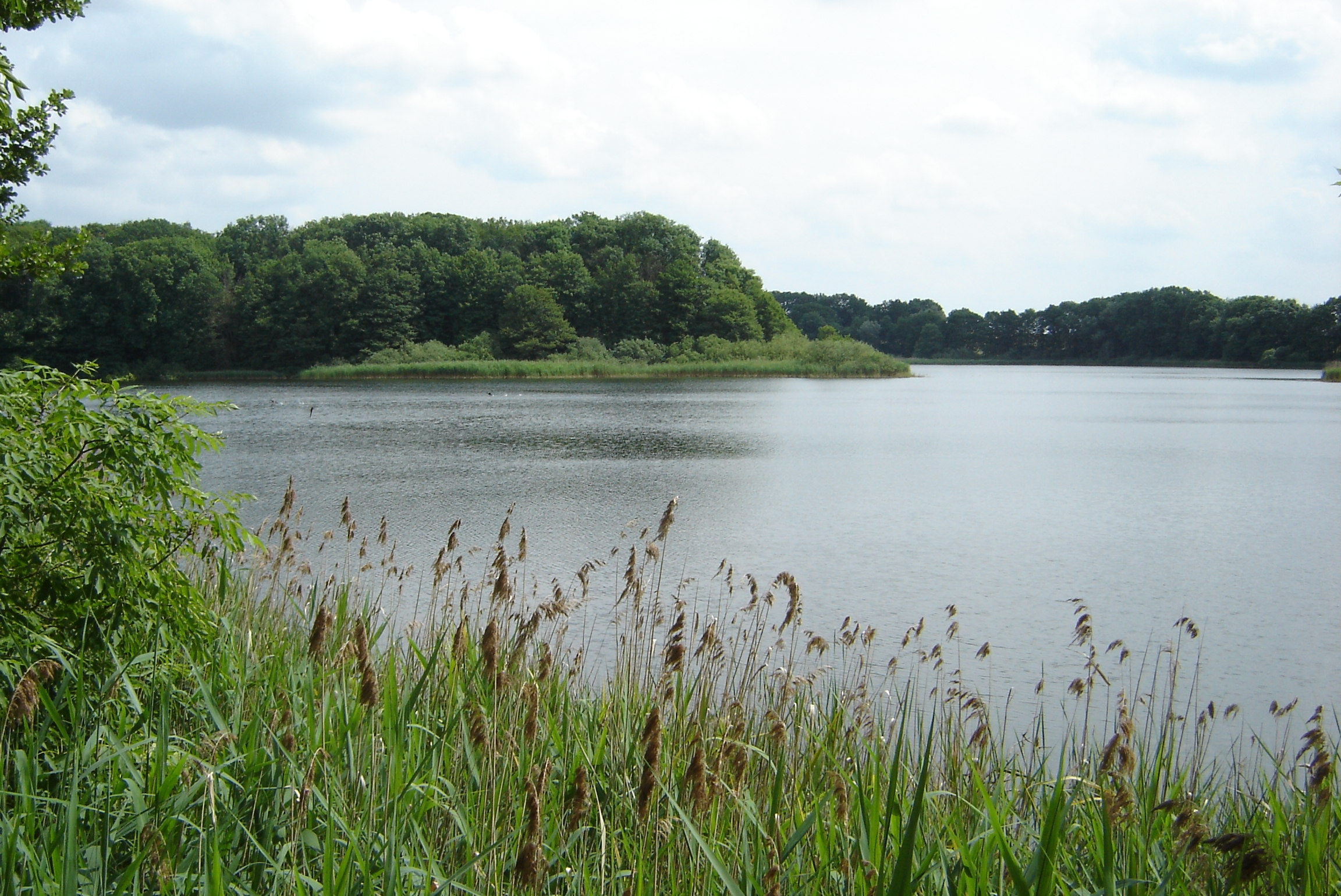
- Lake Bolzer in the nature reserve of the same name (Parchim district, Mecklenburg-Western Pomerania).

- Location within Mecklenburg-Vorpommern
- Location: Mecklenburg-Vorpommern
- Coordinates: 53°40′45″N 11°59′32″E
- Basin countries: Germany
- Surface area: 0.81 km^{2} (0.31 sq mi)
- Max. depth: 15.5 m (51 ft)
- Surface elevation: 31.6 m (104 ft)

Bolzer See is a lake in Mecklenburg-Vorpommern, Germany. At an elevation of 31.6 m, its surface area is 0.81 km².
