= Lankower See (Schwerin) =

Lake in Mecklenburg-Vorpommern, Germany

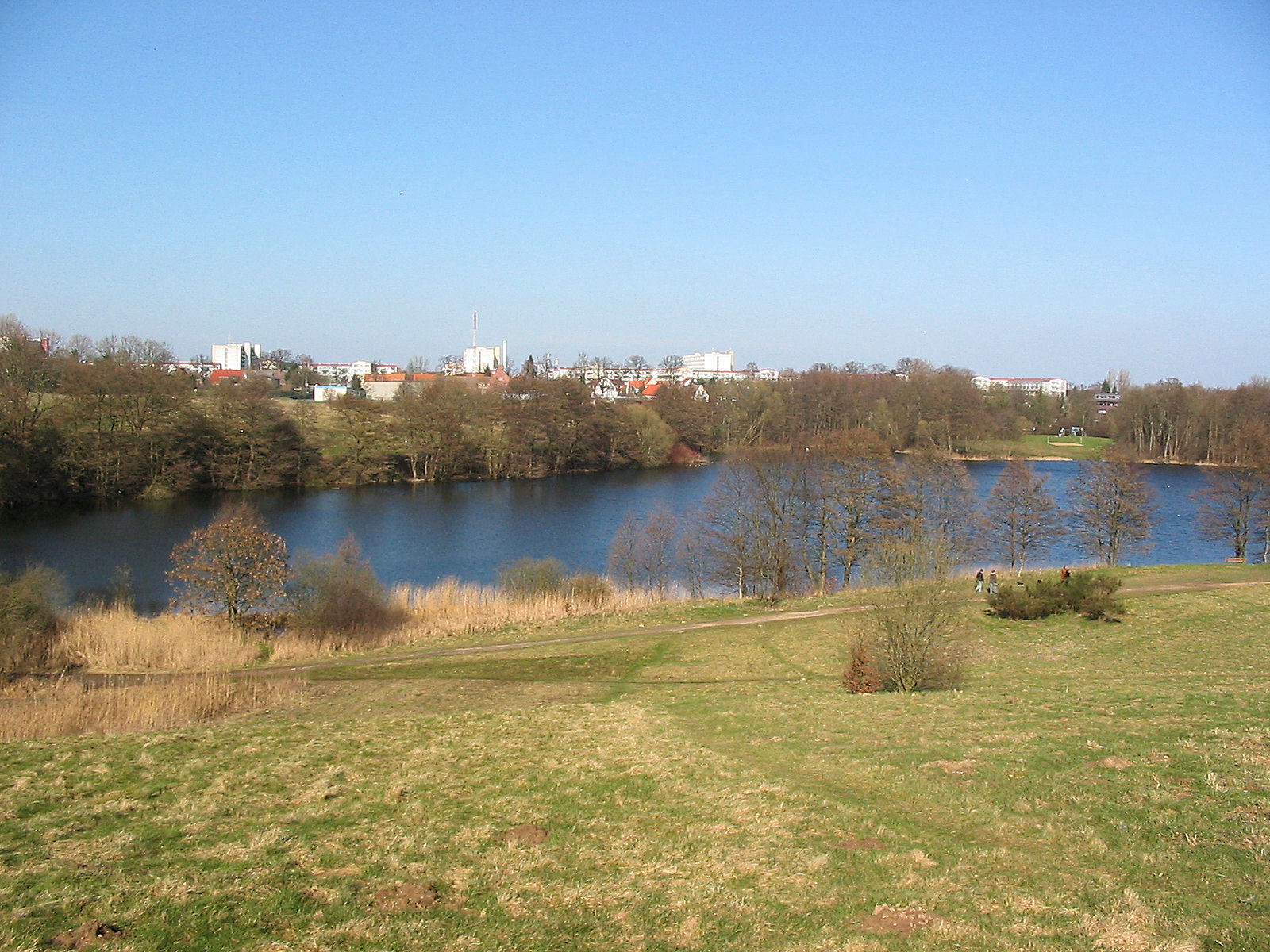

- Location within Mecklenburg-Vorpommern
- Location: West Mecklenburg, Mecklenburg-Vorpommern
- Coordinates: 53°38′28″N 11°22′37″E
- Basin countries: Germany
- Surface area: 0.54 km^{2} (0.21 sq mi)
- Average depth: 5.2 m (17 ft)
- Max. depth: 10.2 m (33 ft)
- Water volume: 2,800,000 m^{3} (99,000,000 cu ft)
- Shore length^{1}: 6.145 km (3.818 mi)
- Surface elevation: 42.5 m (139 ft)
- Settlements: Schwerin
- ^{1} Shore length is not a well-defined measure.

Lankower See (Schwerin) is a lake in West Mecklenburg, Mecklenburg-Vorpommern, Germany. At an elevation of 42.5 m, its surface area is 0.54 km^{2}.
