= Satower See =

Lake in Germany

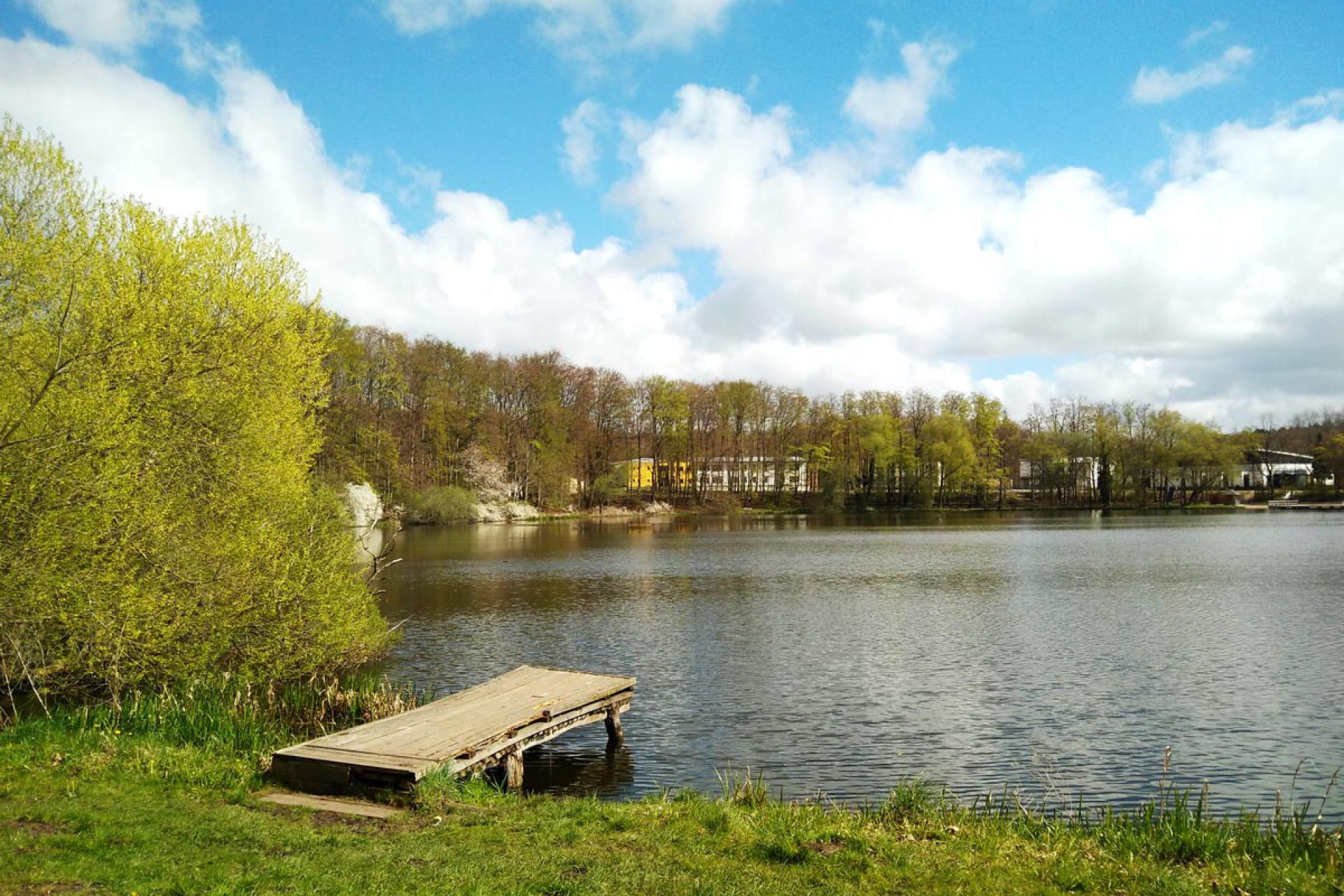

- Location within Mecklenburg-Vorpommern
- Location: Rostock, Mecklenburg-Vorpommern
- Coordinates: 53.99191°N 11.89135°E
- Basin countries: Germany
- Surface area: 0.068 km^{2} (0.026 sq mi)
- Surface elevation: 30.1 m (99 ft)

Satower See is a lake in the Rostock district in Mecklenburg-Vorpommern, Germany. At an elevation of 30.1 m, its surface area is 0.068 km^{2}.
