= Kirchsee (Poel, Mecklenburg-Vorpommern) =

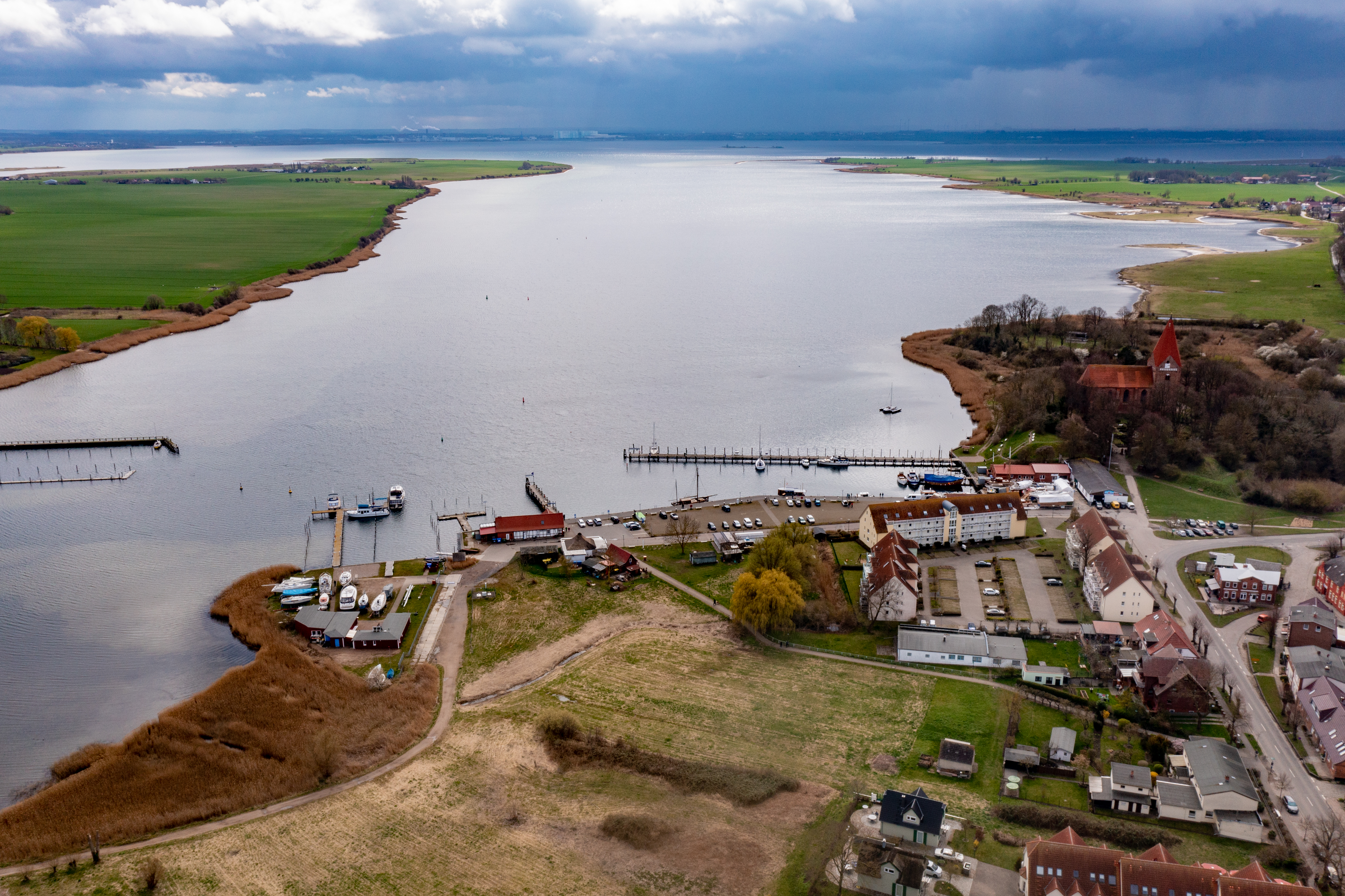

- Location: Poel, Germany
- Coordinates: 53°59′0″N 11°26′0″E
- Type: Bay
- Ocean/sea sources: Baltic Sea
- Basin countries: Germany
- Max. length: 3 km (1.9 mi)
- Max. width: 1 km (0.62 mi)
- Surface elevation: 0 km (0 mi)

Kirchsee, near the island of Poel, is part of Wismar Bay in Mecklenburg-Vorpommern, Germany. The bay cuts deeply into the island of Poel from the south.

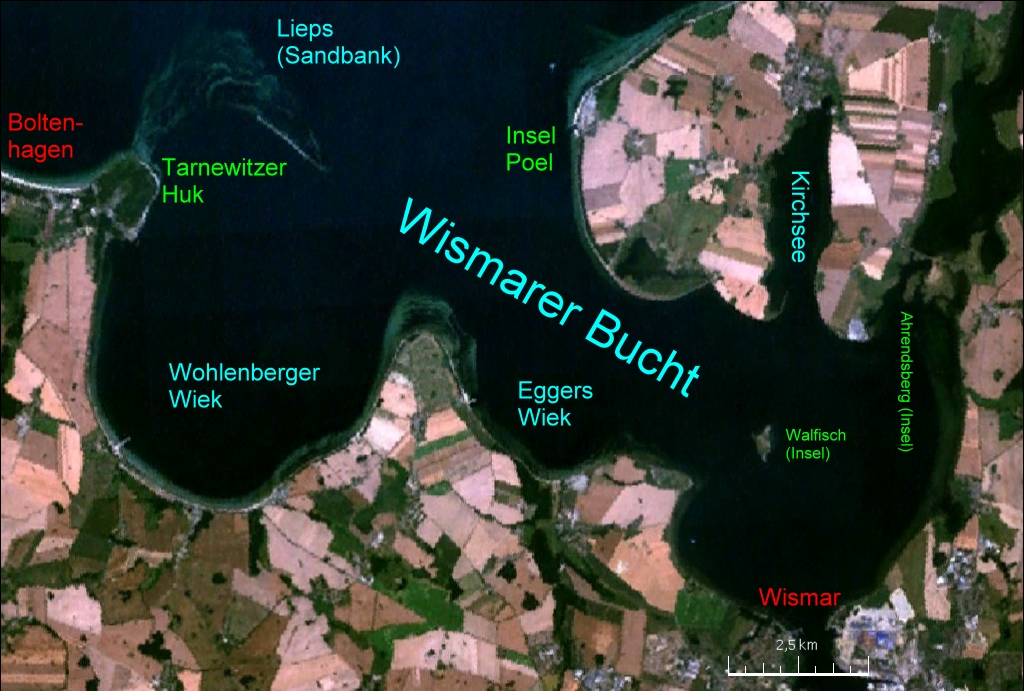
Map with Kirchsee

It is named after the main town on the island of Poel, Kirchdorf. The bay is approximately three kilometers long and up to one kilometer wide at its southern end. The southern opening is formed by the two sand spits, Fährdorfer Haken and Brandenhusener Haken, which were created by wind and currents. The shores of the Kirchsee are very diverse, alternating between cliff coasts, flat sandy shores, and smaller alluvial areas. Kirchsee is a shallow body of water, mostly less than two meters deep. Only the navigation channel leading to the port of Kirchdorf is deeper. Maintaining the navigation channel also ensures Kirchsee’s access to the sea, as this access would otherwise silt up.
