= Rühner See =

Lake in Germany

- Location within Mecklenburg-Vorpommern
- Location: Rostock, Mecklenburg-Vorpommern
- Coordinates: 53°50′04″N 11°56′32″E
- Primary outflows: Seebach
- Basin countries: Germany
- Surface area: 1.01 km^{2} (0.39 sq mi)
- Max. depth: 6 m (20 ft)
- Surface elevation: 2.8 m (9 ft 2 in)

Rühner See is a lake in the Rostock district in Mecklenburg-Vorpommern, Germany. At an elevation of 2.8 m, its surface area is 1.01 km².
