= Stassower See =

Lake in Germany

- Location within Mecklenburg-Vorpommern
- Location: Rostock, Mecklenburg-Vorpommern
- Coordinates: 54.03462°N 12.58746°E
- Basin countries: Germany
- Surface area: 0.086 km^{2} (0.033 sq mi)
- Surface elevation: 35.4 m (116 ft)

Stassower See is a lake in the Rostock district in Mecklenburg-Vorpommern, Germany. At an elevation of 35.4 m, its surface area is 0.086 km².
