= Freesendorfer See =

Lake in Mecklenburg-Vorpommern, Germany

- Location within Mecklenburg-Vorpommern
- Location: Mecklenburg-Vorpommern
- Coordinates: 54°9′45″N 13°41′15″E
- Basin countries: Germany
- Surface area: 0.48 km^{2} (0.19 sq mi)
- Surface elevation: 0.1 m (3.9 in)

Freesendorfer See is a lake in Mecklenburg-Vorpommern, Germany. At an elevation of 0.1 m, its surface area is 0.48 km².
