= Borgwallsee =

Lake in Mecklenburg-Vorpommern, Germany

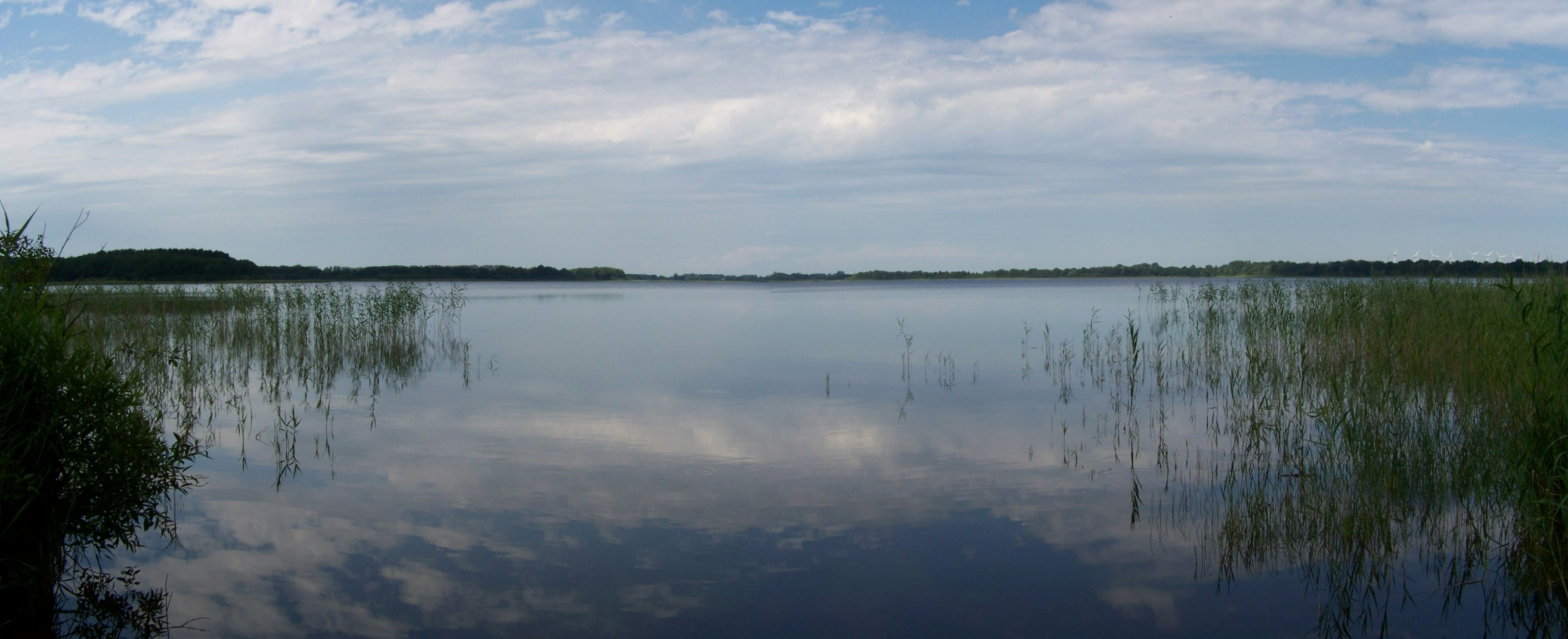

- Location within Mecklenburg-Vorpommern
- Location: Mecklenburg-Vorpommern
- Coordinates: 54°16′24″N 13°0′28″E
- Primary outflows: Barthe
- Basin countries: Germany
- Surface area: 3.89 km^{2} (1.50 sq mi)
- Average depth: 2.4 m (7 ft 10 in)
- Max. depth: 4.8 m (16 ft)
- Surface elevation: 13.2 m (43 ft)

Borgwallsee is a lake in Mecklenburg-Vorpommern, Germany, at an elevation of 13.2 m (43 ft). Its surface area is 3.89 km^{2} (1.50 sq mi). The average depth is 2.4 m (7 ft 10 in). Apart from the woods on the southern shore, the area surrounding the lake is used widely for agriculture.

Borgwallsee is a drinking water reservoir serving the city of Stralsund. As such, water activities are restricted and bathing is allowed only in designated areas.
