= Großer Peetscher See =

Lake in Dreetz, Mecklenburg-Vorpommern, Germany

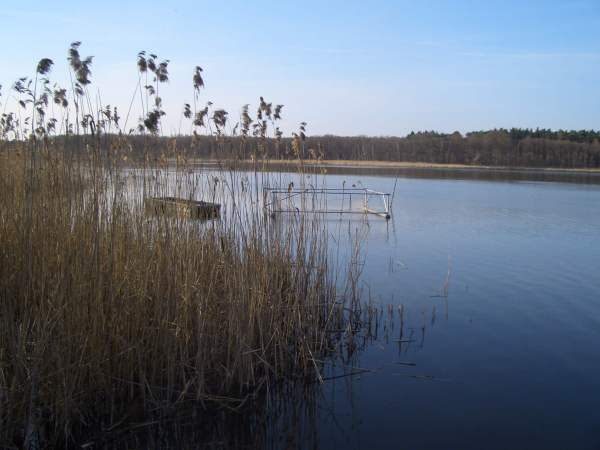

- Location within Mecklenburg-Vorpommern
- Location: Dreetz, Rostock, Mecklenburg-Vorpommern
- Coordinates: 53°48′23″N 11°58′12″E
- Primary outflows: Hullergraben
- Basin countries: Germany
- Max. length: 1.39 km (0.86 mi)
- Max. width: 0.6 km (0.37 mi)
- Surface area: 0.62 km^{2} (0.24 sq mi)
- Max. depth: 2 m (6.6 ft)
- Surface elevation: 2.1 m (6.9 ft)

Großer Peetscher See is a lake in the Rostock district in Mecklenburg-Vorpommern, Germany. At an elevation of 2.1 m, its surface area is 0.62 km^{2}. It is in the catchment area of Tarnow.
