= Pinnower See =

Lake in Germany

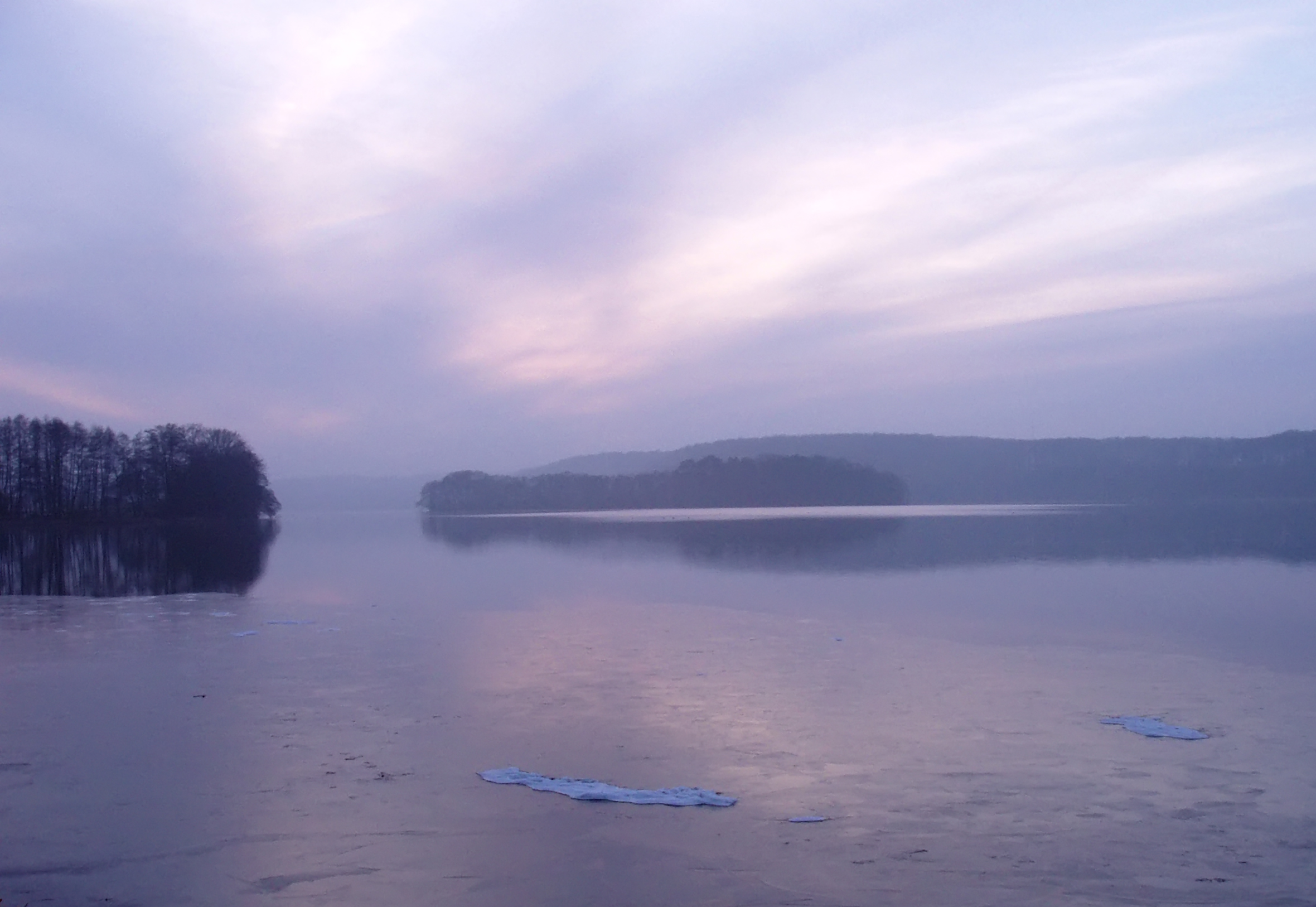

- Location within Mecklenburg-Vorpommern
- Location: Mecklenburg-Vorpommern
- Coordinates: 53°36′13″N 11°31′37″E
- Primary inflows: none
- Basin countries: Germany
- Surface area: 2.68 km^{2} (1.03 sq mi)
- Average depth: 7 m (23 ft)
- Max. depth: 16 m (52 ft)
- Surface elevation: 27.9 m (92 ft)

Pinnower See is a lake in Mecklenburg-Vorpommern, Germany. At an elevation of 27.9 m, its surface area is 2.68 km².
