= West Mecklenburg =

West Mecklenburg (German: Westmecklenburg) is the western part of the German federal state of Mecklenburg-Vorpommern, covering an area of ca. 7,000 km². It incorporates parts of the historic territories of Mecklenburg-Schwerin and Mecklenburg-Strelitz (parts of the former Principality of Ratzeburg around the town of Schönberg (Mecklenburg)) and of Saxe-Lauenburg (the Prussian municipalities allocated to the former Soviet Zone of Occupation by the Barber-Lyashchenko Agreement).

The region of West Mecklenburg consists of the districts of Nordwestmecklenburg and Ludwigslust-Parchim as well as the independent city of Schwerin and is legally defined as a planning region, i. e. a sub-region for regional spatial planning that is carried out by a regional planning association.

The region had a population of 483,939 on 30 June 2008. The centre for the region is the state capital of Schwerin; other important towns are Parchim, Ludwigslust, Wismar, Gadebusch, Klütz, Grevesmühlen and Hagenow.

West Mecklenburg is an undulating morainic terrain in the Baltic Uplands interspersed with inland lakes and formed by the Weichsel glaciation. On the Baltic Sea rim is a cliffed coast with the Bay of Lübeck and Bay of Wismar with the island of Poel and the seaside resort of Boltenhagen. In the northeast West Mecklenburg gives way to the region of Middle Mecklenburg; in the southeast it merges gradually into the Mecklenburg Lake District.

== District reorganisation ==
Based on the decision by the state parliament (Landtag) on 5 April 2006 a major new district, Westmecklenburg, was to have been created on 1 October 2009 with its capital at Schwerin. This megadistrict was to have incorporated the old districts of Ludwigslust, Nordwestmecklenburg and Parchim as well as the formerly independent towns of Schwerin and Wismar. Following a judgement by the State Constitutional Court on 26 July 2007 the reform act could not be carried through in its intended form as it was incompatible with the constitution.
