= Langsee (Mecklenburg) =

Lake in Germany

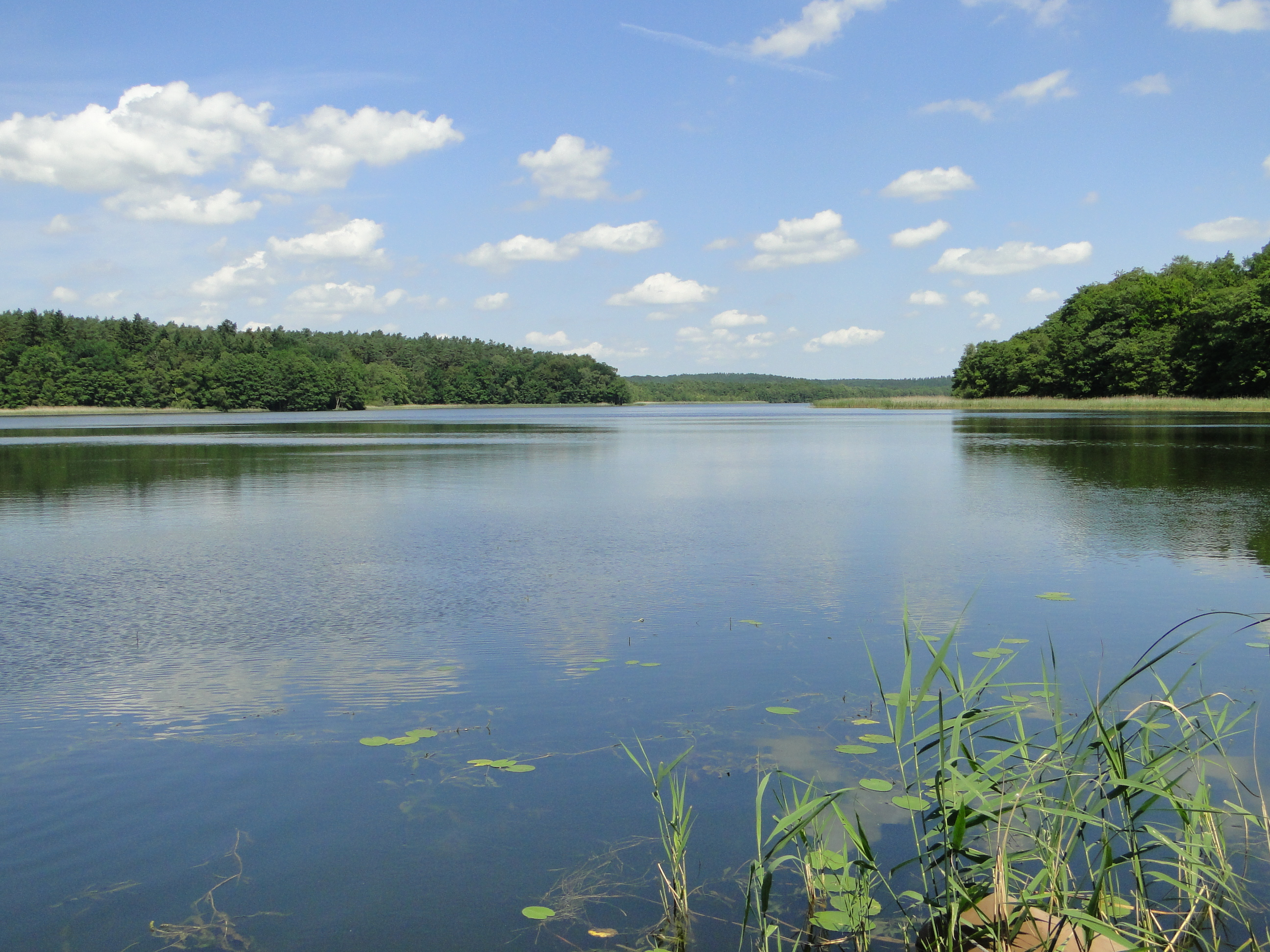

- Location within Mecklenburg-Vorpommern
- Location: Rostock, Mecklenburg-Vorpommern
- Coordinates: 53°37′55.63″N 12°14′3.5″E
- Basin countries: Germany
- Surface area: 0.82 km^{2} (0.32 sq mi)
- Surface elevation: 50.1 m (164 ft)

Langsee is a lake in the Rostock district in Mecklenburg-Vorpommern, Germany. At an elevation of 50.1 m, its surface area is 0.82 km^{2}.
